= List of justices of the Supreme Court of Pakistan =

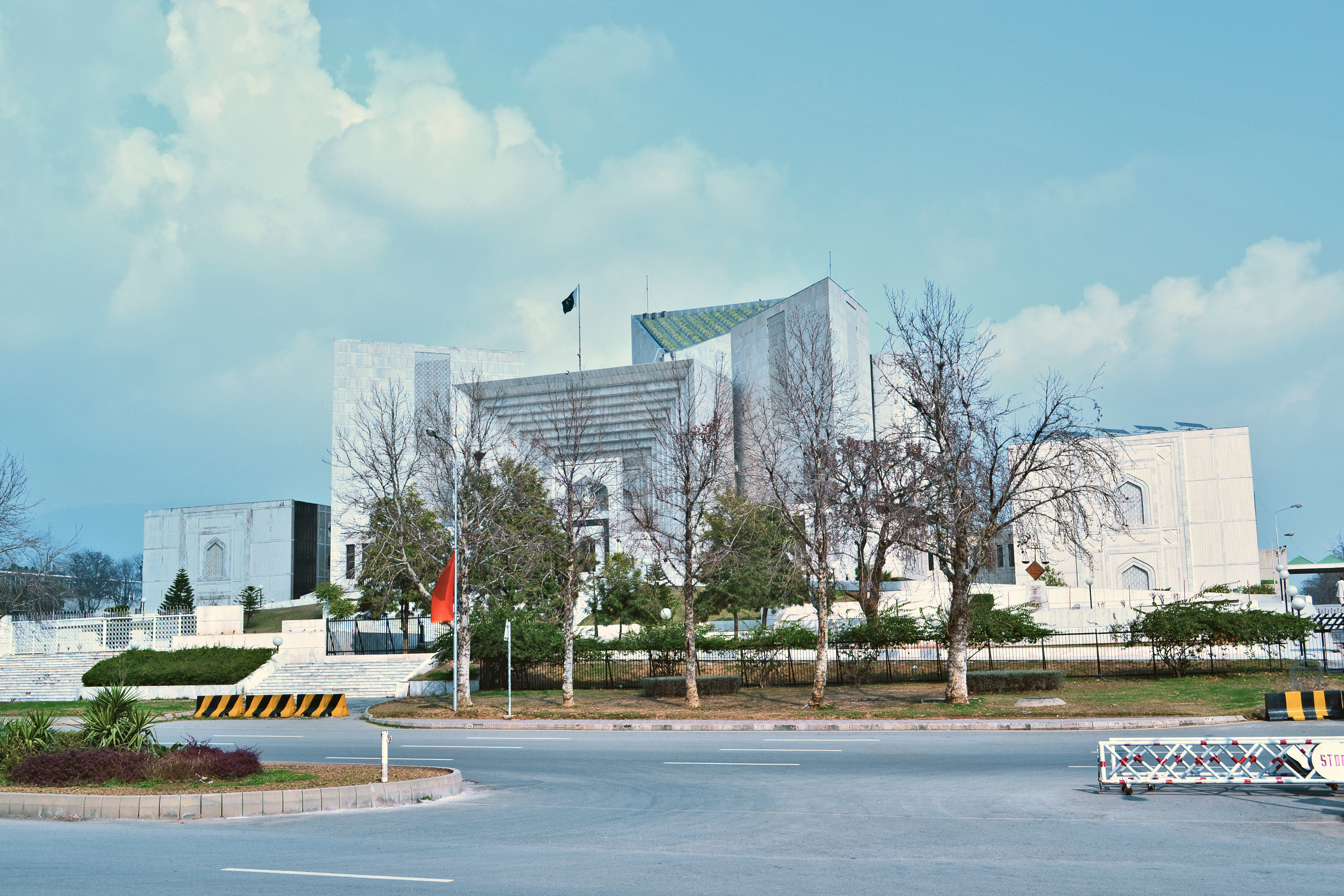
The Supreme Court building on Constitution Avenue, Islamabad

The Supreme Court of Pakistan is the highest and apex court in the judicial hierarchy of Pakistan. Its judicial membership currently composed of the Chief Justice of Pakistan and fifteen senior justices, also consisting of the ad hoc appointments of the Shariat Appellate. Advisement for nomination and necessary consultation from the Prime Minister of Pakistan, the President of Pakistan appointed the justices.

The Supreme Court was restructured in its modern form in 1956 by the Part VIII of the Constitution, which stipulates that the "judicial power of Pakistan, shall be vested in one supreme Court" together with any lower courts Congress may establish. Article 185(1) further specified the Court's original and appellate jurisdiction, created four judicial high courts, and a system of entering an appeal against punishment rendered by the high courts. The Constitution allows the Parliament to determine the fixed number of the justices, or in special cases such as when the parliamentary recess, the Constitution allows a constitutional right to fix the number of the judges.

Justices of the Supreme Court serve in the office until they attain the age of sixty-five years, unless they resign sooner or are removed from the office in accordance with the Constitution. This article focuses on the appointed justices of the Supreme Court from 1947 to the present.

== List of justices ==
Senior justices of the Supreme Court of Pakistan from 1947–present
Listed senior justices	Previous high courts	Active service tenured dates (dd//mm//yyyy)	Appointed by	Termination due	Notes
Sir Abdul Rashid	Lahore HC	27 Jun 1949–29 Jun 1954	Jinnah	Retired	1st Chief Justice of Pakistan
Abdul Rehman	Sindh HC	7 Feb 1950–4 Oct 1953	Nazimuddin	Retired	
A.S.M. Akram	Dhaka HC	15 Feb 1950–27 Feb 1956	Nazimuddin	Retired	
Muhammad Sharif	Lahore HC	17 May 1950 – 23 May 1950; 13 Apr 1954–1 Apr 1958	Nazimuddin	Retired	Appointment as Acting Judge
Muhammad Munir	Lahore HC	1 Oct 1951–2 May 1960	Nazimuddin	Retired	Appointed 2nd Chief Justice of Pakistan
Muhammad Shahabuddin	Dhaka HC	6 Oct 1952–23 Dec 1952; 6 Feb 1953–7 Jun 1953; 4 Oct 1953–12 May 1960	Nazimuddin; Muhammad; Mirza	Retired	Appointed 3rd Chief Justice of Pakistan
Alvin R. Cornelius	Lahore HC	22 Nov 1951–9 Jun 1952; 17 Oct 1952–31 May 1953; 10 Oct 1953–29 Feb 1968	Muhammad; Mirza; Khan	Retired	Appointed 4th Chief Justice of Pakistan
S.A. Rehman	Lahore HC	2 Mar 1955–23 May 1955; 2 Apr 1958–3 Jun 1968	Muhammad; Mirza	Retired	Appointed 5th Chief Justice of Pakistan
Amiruddin Ahmad	Peshawar HC	12 Mar 1956–21 Dec 1960	Mirza	Retired	
Fazal Akbar	Dhaka HC	18 May 1960–17 Nov 1968	Khan	Retired	Appointed 6th Chief Justice of Pakistan
Badi-uz-Zaman Kaikaus	Peshawar HC	25 Jul 1960–3 Jan 1966	Khan	Retired	
Hamoodur Rahman	Dhaka HC	22 Dec 1960–31 Dec 1971; 31 Dec 1971–31 Oct 1975	Khan; Bhutto	Death	Appointed 7th Chief Justice of Pakistan
Yacob Ali	Lahore HC	4 Jan 1966–22 Sept 1977	Khan	Retired	Appointed 8th Chief Justice of Pakistan
Sajjad Ahmad Jan	Quetta HC	18 Mar 1968–31 Mar 1973	Khan	Retired	Appointed Chief election commissioner in 1977
Abdus Sattar	Dhaka HC	4 Jun 1968–28 Feb 1971	Khan	Retired	Appointed Chief election commissioner in 1970
Mujibur Rahman Khan	Peshawar HC	18 Nov 1968–23 Nov 1971	Khan	Retired	
Waheeduddin Ahmad	Sindh HC	22 Sept 1969–20 Sept 1974; 23 May 1977 – 6 Feb 1979	Y. Khan; Bhutto	Retired	Appointment as Ad hoc Justice
Salahuddin Ahmed	Sindh HC	4 Dec 1970–28 Feb 1971; 1 Mar 1971–31 Dec 1976	Y. Khan; Bhutto	Retired	
S. Anwar-ul-Haq	Lahore HC	16 Oct 1972–25 Mar 1981	Bhutto	Retired	Appointed 9th Chief Justice of Pakistan
Muhammad Gul	Lahore HC	14 Apr 1973–31 Dec 1976	Bhutto	Retired	
Mohammad Afzal Cheema	Lahore HC	8 Oct 1974–31 Dec 1977	Chaudhry	Retired	
A.K. Shaikh	Sindh HC	8 Oct 1974–23 Jan 1975; 1 Jul 1979–24 Mar 1991	Chaudhry; Zia	Retired	
Malik Muhammad Akram	Lahore HC	26 Dec 1975–1 Oct 1979	Chaudhry	Retired	
Dorab Patel	Sindh HC	7 Jan 1976–25 Mar 1981	Chaudhry	PCO 1981	Seek Retirement after 1981 PCO
Mohammad Haleem	Sindh HC	7 Jan 1977–31 Dec 1989	Chaudhry	Retired	Appointed 10th Chief Justice of Pakistan
Qaisar Khan	Quetta HC	7 Jan 1977–30 July 1978	Chaudhry	Retired	
G.S. Shah	Lahore HC	10 Oct 1977–16 Oct 1980	Chaudhry	Retired	
Karam Chauhan	Lahore HC	27 Apr 1978–13 Jun 1979; 14 Jun 1979–4 Feb 1982	Chaudhry; Zia-ul-Haq	Retired	Appointment as Ad hoc Justice; Oath after 1981 PCO
Aslam Riaz Hussain	Lahore HC	12 Jan 1978–23 Aug 1988	Chaudhry	Retired	Served as acting Chief Justice of Pakistan on many occasions from 1979 to 1988.
Azfal Zullah	Quetta HC	14 Jun 1979–18 Apr 1993	Chaudhry	Retired	Appointed 11th Chief Justice of Pakistan
N.H. Shah	Lahore HC	18 May 1977–14 Jun 1979; 14 Jun 1979–14 Apr 1994	Chaudhry; Zia-ul-Haq	Retired	Appointed 12th Chief Justice of Pakistan
Shafi-ur-Rahman	Lahore HC	14 Jun 1979–29 Jul 1981; 31 Jul 1981 –15 Feb 1994	Chaudhry; Zia-ul-Haq	Retired	
M.M. Hussain	Lahore HC	2 Jun 1980–25 Mar 1981	Zia-ul-Haq	Retired	Appointment as Ad hoc Justice; Asked to retired
Fakhruddin Ebrahim	Sindh HC	17 Jun 1980–25 Mar 1981	Zia-ul-Haq	PCO 1981	Seek Retirement after 1981 PCO
Shahnawaz Khan	Peshawar HC	5 Apr 1981–1 Jul 1982	Zia-ul-Haq	Retired	
S.A. Nusrat	Sindh HC	4 Aug 1981–30 Apr 1989	Zia-ul-Haq	Retired	
Zafar Hussain Mirza	Sindh HC	4 Aug 1981–9 Oct 1991	Zia-ul-Haq	Retired	
M.S.H. Quraishi	Quetta HC	30 July 1981–30 Sept 1985	Zia-ul-Haq	Retired	Appointment as Ad hoc Justice
Burhanuddin Khan	Peshawar HC	2 Mar 1982–17 Dec 1987	Zia-ul-Haq	Retired	Appointment as acting Justice
A.H. Qazilbash	Peshawar HC	17 Apr 1986–14 Sept 1991	Zia-ul-Haq	Retired	Appointment as acting Justice
Javid Iqbal	Lahore HC	5 Oct 1986–4 Oct 1989	Zia-ul-Haq	Retired	
S.S. Jan	Quetta HC	5 Oct 1986–30 Jun 1996	Zia-ul-Haq	Retired	Appointment as Ad hoc Justice
G.M. Mirza	Lahore HC	25 Mar 1987–31 Mar 1990	Zia-ul-Haq	Retired	
S.U.A. Shah	Sindh HC	8 Dec 1987–1 Sept 1988	Zia-ul-Haq	Retired	Appointment as Ad hoc Justice
Naimuddin	Quetta HC	4 Sept 1988–9 Nov 1991	G. Khan	Retired	
A.S. Salam	Peshawar HC	13 Dec 1988–31 Mar 1993	G. Khan	Retired	
A.Q. Chaudhry	Lahore HC	13 Dec 1989–12 Jul 1994	G. Khan	Retired	
Ajmal Mian	Sindh HC	13 Dec 1989–30 Jul 1999	G. Khan	Retired	Appointed 14th Chief Justice of Pakistan
R.S. Sidwa	Sindh HC	13 Dec 1989–31 Aug 1992	G. Khan	Retired	
A.H. Memon	Sindh HC	14 Dec 1989–8 Oct 1990	G. Khan	Retired	Appointment as acting Justice
M.A. Lone	Lahore HC	13 Aug 1990–3 July 1993	G. Khan	Retired	
Syed Sajjad Ali Shah	Sindh HC	5 Nov 1990–16 Feb 1998	G. Khan	Retired	Appointed 13th Chief Justice of Pakistan
Rafiq Tarar	Lahore HC	17 Jan 1991–1 Nov 1994	G. Khan	Retired	Elevated as President of Pakistan
Saleem Akhter	Sindh HC	25 Mar 1991–22 Mar 1997	G. Khan	Retired	
Wali Moh'd Khan	Peshawar HC	28 Oct 1991–31 Oct 1994	G. Khan	Retired	Appointment as acting Justice
Saeeduzzaman Siddiqui	Sindh HC	21 May 1992–26 Jan 2000	G. Khan	PCO 2000	Appointed 15th Chief Justice of Pakistan
F.I. Khan	Peshawar HC	3 April 1993–31 Dec 1997	G. Khan	Retired	
M.H. Sial	Lahore HC	7 Jun 1993–17 Oct 1994; 19 Oct 1994–20 Apr 1997	G. Khan; Leghari	Retired	Appointment as acting Justice
Fazal Karim	Lahore HC	7 Oct 1994–31 Jul 1996		Retired	Appointment as acting Justice
Munir Khan	Quetta HC	7 Aug 1994–6 Aug 1996	Leghari	Retired	Appointment as acting Justice
Muhammad Ilyas	Peshawar HC	19 Oct 1994–30 Sept 1996	Leghari	Retired	Appointment as acting Justice
Mir Hazar Khoso	Quetta HC	30 Sept 1994–29 Sept 1996	Leghari	Retired	Elevated as Prime Minister (2013)
Mamoon Kazi	Lahore HC	22 Feb 1995–26 Jan 2000	Leghari	Retired	
Mukhtar Ahmed Junejo	Sindh HC	19 Oct 1995–19 Feb 2000	Leghari	Retired	
Afrasiab Khan	Peshawar HC	22 Feb 1995–14 Jan 2000	Leghari	Retired	
N.A. Zahid	Sindh HC	18 Apr 1996–26 Jan 2000	Leghari	Retired	Appointment as Ad-hoc Justice
Munavar Mirza	Sindh HC	17 Nov 1996–24 Nov 1999	Leghari	Retired	
Khalil-ur-Rehman	Lahore HC	17 Dec 1996–26 Jan 2000	Leghari	Retired	
Ijaz Nisar	Peshawar HC	29 May 1997–15 Jun 2000	Leghari	Retired	
Riaz Ahmad	Lahore HC	4 Nov 1997–31 Dec 2003	Leghari	Retired	Appointed 18th Chief Justice of Pakistan
Wajihuddin Ahmed	Sindh HC	5 May 1998–26 Jan 2000	Tarar	Retired	
Irshad Hassan	Lahore HC	4 Nov 1998–6 Jan 2002	Tarar	Retired	Appointed 16th Chief Justice of Pakistan
Bashir Jehangiri	Peshawar HC	4 Nov 1998–31 Jan 2002	Tarar	Retired	Appointed 17th Chief Justice of Pakistan
Rashid Khan	Peshawar HC	24 Apr 1999–26 Jan 2000	Tarar	Retired	
Abdur Rehman Khan	Peshawar HC	4 Nov 1998–5 Sept 2001	Tarar	Retired	Appointed Acting Chief Justice of Pakistan (Brief Period)
Muhammad Arif	Lahore HC	4 Nov 1998–2 Jan 2002	Tarar	Retired	
Kamal Allam	Peshawar HC	22 Apr 1999–26 Jan 2000	Tarar	Retired	
Nazim Hussain Siddiqui	Sindh HC	4 Feb 2000–29 Jun 2005	Tarar	Retired	Appointed 19th Chief Justice of Pakistan
Qazi Moh'd Faruk	Lahore HC	4 Feb 2000–31 Dec 2003	Tarar	Retired	
T.A. Khan	Peshawar HC	27 Feb 2000–16 Jan 2004	Tarar	Retired	
M.M. Ajmal	Quetta HC	28 Apr 2000–14 Aug 2004	Tarar	Retired	
Deedar Hussian	Quetta HC	28 Apr 2000–10 Dec 2004	Tarar	Retired	
Hamid Mirza	Sindh HC	28 Apr 2000–14 Sept 2004; 14 Sept 2004–13 Sept 2005	Tarar; Musharraf	Retired	Appointed Chief Election Commissioner
K.N. Bhandari	Quetta HC	7 Sept 2000–13 Sept 2006	Tarar	Retired	Appointment as Ad-hoc Justice
Iftikhar Chaudhry	Quetta HC	4 Feb 2000–11 Dec 2013	Tarar	Retired	Appointed 20th Chief Justice
Rana Bhagwandas	Sindh HC	4 Feb 2000–19 Dec 2008	Tarar	2007 PCO	
Javaid Iqbal	Quetta HC	28 Apr 2000–24 Mar 2011	Tarar	Retired	
A.H. Dogar	Sindh HC	28 Apr 2000–21 Mar 2009	Tarar	Retired	
Raza Khan	Peshawar HC	10 Jan 2002– 09 Feb 2010	Musharraf	Retired	
Khalil-ur-Rehman Ramday	Sindh HC	10 Jan 2002–13 Jan 2010	Musharraf	Retired	
Nawaz Abbasi	Lahore HC	10 Jan 2002–6 Jan 2008	Musharraf	Retired	
Faqir Muhammad	Lahore HC	10 Jan 2002–5 Aug 2008	Musharraf	Retired	
Falak Sher	Lahore HC	7 Sept 2002–21 Sept 2008	Musharraf	Retired	
Shakirullah Jan	Peshawar HC	29 Jul 2004– 17 Aug 2012	Musharraf	Retired	
Javaid Buttar	Lahore HC	29 Jul 2004–5 Aug 2009	Musharraf	Retired	
Tassaduq H. Jillani	Lahore HC	12 December 2003 – 5 July 2014	Musharraf	Retired	Appointed 21st Chief Justice (2014)
S.S. Ashad	Sindh HC	5 Apr 2005–7 Oct 2008	Musharraf	Retired	-
Nasir-ul-Mulk	Peshawar HC	5 Apr 2005–17 Aug 2015	Musharraf	Retired	Appointed 22nd Chief Justice and Elevated as Prime Minister of Pakistan
Fayyaz Ahmad	Lahore HC	14 Sept 2005–13 Jan 2012	Musharraf	Retired	-
Ijaz Ahmad	Lahore HC	14 Sept 2005–13 Jan 2013	Musharraf	Retired	
Jamshed Ali	Lahore HC	14 Sept 2005–30 Sept 2008	Musharraf	Retired	
Ghulam Rabbani	Sindh High Court	14 Sept 2006–30 Sept 2008; 12 Apr 2009–5 Nov 2013	Musharraf; Zardari	Retired	Appointment as ad-hoc Justice
Qaim Jan	Peshawar HC	6 Nov 2007–31 Jul 2009	Musharraf	Retired	
Ijaz-ul-Hassan	Peshawar HC	6 Nov 2007–31 Jul 2009	Musharraf	Retired	
Zahid Hussain	Lahore HC	12 Apr 2009– 25 Feb 2011	Zardari	Retired	
Sair Ali	Lahore HC	12 Apr 2009–09 Dec 2011	Zardari	Retired	
M.A. Shahid Siddiqui	Lahore HC	12 Apr 2009– 13 Oct 2011	Zardari	Retired	
Jawwad S. Khawaja	Lahore HC	4 Jun 2009–19 Oct 2015	Zardari	Retired	Appointed 23rd Chief Justice
Anwar Zaheer Jamali	Sindh HC	3 Aug 2009–30 Dec 2016	Zardari	Retired	Appointed 24th Chief Justice
Arif Hussain	Sindh HC	7 Sept 2009–4 Apr 2014	Zardari	Retired	
Rehmat Hussain Jaffery	Sindh HC	7 Sept 2009–4 Apr 2014	Zardari	Retired	
Tariq Pervez Khan	Peshawar HC	21 Oct 2009– 13 Feb 2013	Zardari	Retired	Appointed Chief Minister of Khyber Pakhtunkhwa
Mian Saqib Nisar	Lahore HC	18 Feb 2010– 17 Jan 2019	Zardari	Retired	Appointed 25th Chief Justice
Asif Saeed Khosa	Lahore HC	18 Feb 2010–20 Dec 2019	Zardari	Retired	Appointed 26th Chief Justice
Sarmad Jalal Osmany	Sindh HC	18 Feb 2010–24 May 2022	Zardari	Retired	
Amir Hani Muslim	Sindh HC	14 Feb 2011–4 Jan 2017	Zardari	Retired	
Muhammad Athar Saeed	Sindh HC	15 Nov 2011–28 Sep 2014	Hussain	Retired	
Ijaz Ahmad Chaudhry	Lahore HC	17 Nov 2011 – 15 Dec 2015	Zardari	Retired	
Gulzar Ahmed	Quetta HC	17 Nov 2011 – 28 Sept 2014	Zardari	Retired	Appointed 27th Chief Justice
Azmat Saeed	Lahore HC	6 Jan 2012 – 27 Aug 2019	Zardari	Retired	
Iqbal Hameed-ur-Rahman	Islamabad HC	25 Feb 2013 – 25 Sept 2022	Zardari	Retired	
Mushir Alam	Sindh HC	20 Sept 2013 – 18 Aug 2021	Hussain	Retired	
Umar Ata Bandial	Lahore HC	20 Sept 2013 – 16 Sep 2022	Hussain	Retired	Appointed 28th Chief Justice
Qazi Faez Isa	Quetta HC	5 Sep 2014 – 25 Oct 2024	Zardari	Retired	Appointed 29th Chief Justice of Pakistan
Maqbool Baqar	Sindh HC	17 Feb 2015 – 4 Apr 2022	Hussain	Retired	
Manzoor Ahmad Malik	Lahore HC	6 Nov 2015 – 30 Apr 2021	Hussain	Retired	
Sardar Tariq Masood	Lahore HC	6 Nov 2015 – 10 March 2024	Hussain	Retired	
Faisal Arab	Sindh HC	13 Dec 2015 – 4 Nov 2020	Hussain	Retired	
Ijazul Ahsan	Lahore HC	28 Jun 2016 – 11 Jan 2024	Hussain	Resigned	Resigned amidst judicial proceedsings against J. Naqvi.
Mazhar Alam Miankhel	Peshawar HC	30 Dec 2016 – 13 Jul 2022	Hussain	Retired	
Sajjad Ali Shah	Sindh HC	15 Mar 2017 – 13 Aug 2022	Hussain	Retired	
Mansoor Ali Shah	Lahore HC	7 Feb 2018 – 13 Nov 2025	Hussain	Resigned	
Munib Akhtar	Sindh HC	8 May 2018 – 13 Dec 2028	Hussain	Active service	
Yahya Afridi	Peshawar HC	28 Jun 2018 – 22 Jan 2030	Hussain	Active service	Appointed 30th Chief Justice of Pakistan. Last one to hold the title.
Qazi Muhammad Amin Ahmed	Lahore HC	24 Apr 2019 – 25 Mar 2022	Alvi	Retired	
Aminuddin Khan	Lahore HC	21 Oct 2019 – 30 Nov 2025	Alvi	Elevated	Appointed as the 1st Chief Justice of the Federal Constitutional Court
Mazahar Ali Akbar Naqvi	Lahore HC	16 Mar 2020 – 10 Jan 2024 (removed)	Alvi	Resigned will be considered as a removed Judge	A reference was being heard against him in the Supreme Judicial Council on allegations of (financial) misconduct, before the SJC came to a conclusion, he resigned. The SJC has decided to continue hearing the reference despite his resignation. On 7 March 2024, the Supreme Judicial Council of Pakistan opinioned that Naqvi was guilty of misconduct and should have been removed as a Judge.
Jamal Khan Mandokhail	Balochistan HC	9 Aug 2021 – 11 Nov 2026	Alvi	Active Service	
Muhammad Ali Mazhar	Sindh HC	16 Aug 2021 – 04 Oct 2029	Alvi	Active Service	
Ayesha Malik	Lahore HC	6 Jan 2022 – 2 Jun 2031	Alvi	Active Service	
Athar Minallah	Islamabad HC	11 Nov 2022 – 13 Nov 2025	Alvi	Resigned	
Hasan Azhar Rizvi	Sindh HC	11 Nov 2022 – 1 Feb 2027	Alvi	Elevated	Appointed as Justice of the Federal Constitutional Court
Shahid Waheed	Lahore HC	11 Nov 2022 – 24 Dec 2031	Alvi	Active Service	
Musarrat Hilali	Peshawar HC	7 Jul 2023 – 08 Aug 2026	Alvi	Retired	
Irfan Saadat Khan	Sindh HC	3 Sept 2023 – 07 Feb 2027	Alvi	Active Service	
Naeem Akhtar Afghan	Balochistan HC	11 Mar 2024 – 28 Jun 2028	Alvi	Active Service	
Malik Shehzad Ahmed Khan	Lahore HC	7 June 2024 – 07 Feb 2027	Zardari	Active Service	
Aqeel Ahmed Abbasi	Sindh HC	7 June 2024 – 07 Feb 2027	Zardari	Active Service	
Shahid Bilal Hassan	Lahore HC	7 June 2024 – 12 March 2029	Zardari	Active Service	
Muhammad Hashim Kakar	Balochistan HC	14 Feb 2025 - 18 Sep 2028	Zardari	Active Service	
Miangul Hassan Aurangzeb	Islamabad HC	14 Feb 2025 - 14 Sep 2035	Zardari	Active Service	

== Appointments after 2007 state emergency ==
Senior justices of the Supreme Court of Pakistan after 2007
Listed senior justices	Previous high courts	Active service tenured dates (dd//mm//yyyy)	Appointed by	Termination	Notes
Musa Leghari	Quetta HC	6 Nov 2007–31 Jul 2009	Musharraf	Void	
Ejaz Yousaf	Sindh HC	6 Nov 2007–31 Jul 2009	Musharraf	Void	
Akhtar Shabbir	Lahore HC	13 Nov 2007–8 Jun 2009	Musharraf	Void	
Zia Pervez	Sindh HC	13 Nov 2007–31 Jul 2009	Musharraf	Void	
Hamid Farooq	Lahore HC	10 Dec 2007–31 Jul 2009	Musharraf	Void	
Syed Sakhi Hussain Bokhari	Lahore HC	10 Dec 2007–31 Jul 2009	Musharraf	Void	
Zawvar Jaffery	Lahore HC	10 Dec 2007–31 Jul 2009	Musharraf	Void	
Syed Sakhi Hussain Bokhari	Sindh HC	10 Dec 2007–31 Jul 2009	Musharraf	Void	
Sheikh Hakim Ali	Lahore HC	8 Feb 2008–31 Jul 2009	Musharraf	Void	
Muhammad Furrukh Mahmud	Lahore HC	8 Feb 2008–31 Jul 2009	Musharraf	Void	
Sabihuddin Ahmed	Sindh HC	19 Sept 2008–9 Apr 2009	Musharraf	Death	
Muhammad Aslam	Islamabad HC	7 Mar 2008–31 Jul 2009	Musharraf	Void	
