= Reserved seats case =

2024 court case in Pakistan

Reserved Seats Case
- Court: Supreme Court of Pakistan
- Full case name: Sunni Ittehad Council through its Chairman, Faisalabad and another v. Election Commission of Pakistan through its Secretary, Islamabad and others
- Decided: July 12, 2024; 16 months ago

Case history
- Prior actions: Decision by Election Commission of Pakistan to not give reserve seats to the PTI-backed Sunni Ittehad Council (SIC).; Peshawar High Court’s decision of not granting 77 reserve seats to the SIC
- Appealed from: Peshawar High Court
- Appealed to: Supreme Court of Pakistan

Outcome
- All PTI-backed independents allowed to join the PTI’s parliamentary party, rather than having to use SIC as a parliamentary vehicle. PTI given their share of reserved seats. Rulings of Election Commission and Peshawar High Court declared null and void.

Court membership
- Judges sitting: Qazi Faez Isa, Mansoor Ali Shah, Munib Akhtar, Yahya Afridi, Aminuddin Khan, Jamal Khan Mandokhail, Muhammad Ali Mazhar, Ayesha Malik, Athar Minallah, Hasan Azhar Rizvi, Shahid Waheed, Irfan Saadat Khan, Naeem Akhtar Afghan

Case opinions
- Majority: Syed Mansoor Ali Shah, joined by Munib Akhtar, Muhammad Ali Mazhar, Ayesha Malik, Athar Minallah, Hasan Azhar Rizvi, Shahid Waheed, Irfan Saadat Khan

Sunni Ittehad Council, Faisalabad, etc. v Election Commission of Pakistan, (Note: "Sunni Ittehad Council, Faisalabad, etc. versus Election Commission of Pakistan through its Secretary, Islamabad, etc.") informally referred to as the Reserved seats case, was a court case which involved the high bench of the Supreme Court of Pakistan (SCP), notably comprising Chief Justice Qazi Faez Isa, and several other high justices. In this case, Sunni Ittehad Council (SIC) challenged the Pakistani Election Commission's decision of not giving allocated reserve seats in the National Assembly, Punjab Assembly, Sindh Assembly, and KPK assembly for women and minorities to SIC members, as the ECP gave the seats to other parties, claiming the party failed to meet the January 24 deadline for the submission of candidates. (Note: Petitioners (Sunni Ittehad Council): Faisal Siddiqui, ASC.; Gohar Ali Khan, ASC.; Salman Akram Raja, ASC.; Sameer Khosa, ASC; Syed Rifaqat Hussain Shah, AOR.; Muhammad Usman Mirza, AOR; Respondents (Election Commission of Pakistan): Mansoor Usman Awan, AGP.; Ch. Aamir Rehman, Addl. AGP.; Sikandar Bashir Mohmand, ASC.; Zafar Iqbal. Sp. Secy. (ECP); M. Arshad, D.G. (L) (ECP); Khurram Shahzad, ADG(L); Falak Shair, L.C. (ECP); Amir Javed, ASC.) On 12 July the court nullified the Election Commissions order and PHC verdict, terming it "unconstitutional" and ordering the PTI to submit a list of candidates. However, the National Assembly did not implement the decision and the ECP objected to the ruling.

== Reserved seats ==
In Pakistan, each provincial assembly and the National Assembly has are a certain number of reserved seats to be given to women or religious minorities from a winning party in the assembly, with reserve seats being granted on proportional representation between the elected parties in the assembly as per the Constitution and Elections Act, 2017.

For the 2024 Pakistani election, PTI candidates ran as independents in result of the verdict in Intra party elections case. These members submitted affidavits to join Sunni Ittehad Council, after winning the elections.

The reserved seats are key, as the incumbent Shehbaz Sharif government could achieve a 2/3 majority if SIC's share of reserved seats are allotted to other parties. A 2/3 majority allows constitutional amendments to be made.

== Arguments ==
The SIC's argument for granting the reserve seats to SIC members was that by law, reserve seats are granted to the already elected parties in an assembly based on proportional representation. PTI-backed candidates held 84 seats under Sunni Ittehad Council in the National Assembly and therefore a certain amount of the proportional representation of the 60 seats for women and 10 minority seats should have been granted to the SIC, according to the SIC argument.

The Election Commission of Pakistan (ECP) and Chief Justice Qazi Faez Isa's argument was that since these members under the SIC registered as independent candidates for the 2024 elections, that they would not receive reserve seats, as they contested as independent. The argument is also that the SIC did not file candidates beforehand for reserve seat holders, as required. The clashing arguments have used the Constitution and Elections Act, 2017. A clashing argument used was that the PTI filed reserve seats candidates but the SIC did not.

== Case details ==
On May 6, 2024, a three-judge SCP bench overturned the Peshawar High Court’s ruling that had granted the Sunni Ittehad Council (SIC) 77 reserved seats, but instead gave the seats to other political parties in various assemblies. The ruling coalition's two-thirds majority was instantly lost as a result of the Supreme Court bench's decision, temporarily.

The SCP has questioned whether the SIC qualifies for the allocation of the reserved seats as do other political parties such as the PML-N, PPP, JUI-F and MQM-P, which have been allocated the reserved seats.

The SIC case differs from the other parties' because, as mandated by Section 104 of the Elections Act, 2017, it did not provide a priority list of its candidates for the two categories of reserved seats (women and minorities) for each assembly before to the general election. As a result, the SIC candidates for the reserved seats also failed to turn in their nomination documents.

Justice Athar Minallah criticized the Election Commission of Pakistan for its failure in not giving reserve seats to the SIC.

On 12 July 2024 a 13-member bench of the Supreme Court announced its majority verdict; (Note: Justices who ruled in favour of the verdict (8): Mansoor Ali Shah; Munib Akhtar; Mohammed Ali Mazhar; Hasan Azhar Rizvi; Ayesha Malik; Athar Minallah; Shahid Waheed; Irfan Saadat Khan; Justices who ruled against the verdict (5): CJP Qazi Faez Isa; Jamal Khan Mandokhail; Yahya Afridi; Aminuddin Khan; Naeem Akhtar Afghan) declaring the decision of the ECP and PHC "null and void," and unconstitutional. Furthering adding that the delisting of PTI's electoral symbol (bat) "cannot disqualify a political party from elections. The PTI was and is a political party," allowing the party to become eligible for minorities and women's reserved seats and ordering it to submit a list of candidates for reserved seats.

Justices Aminuddin Khan and Naeem Akhtar Afghan dissented from the majority verdict and released their detailed minority judgement on 3 August 2024. In their 29-page note, they argued that PTI was not seeking the reserved seats and criticized the majority for ignoring procedural rules, substantial law provisions, and constitutional requirements. They stressed that relief could not be granted to PTI because it was not a party in the case before the ECP, the High Court, or the Supreme Court. They also stated that the majority's verdict was unconstitutional and that no institution is bound to implement an unconstitutional order.

The government has expressed its reservations about the Supreme Court's majority verdict and is working on legislation to prevent its implementation in favor of PTI.

== 2025 Constitutional Bench review hearing ==
On 26 March 2025, the constitutional bench of the Supreme Court chaired by Justice Aminuddin Khan heard review petitions filed by the ECP, PML(N) and PPP on allocation of seats to the SIC. The court said independents can join a party in parliament, but stated it was "constitutionally unsound" for them to join one that did not partake in elections. The court also said that the PTI/SIC was not entitled to reserved seats as it had not contested in the elections.

Justice Mandokhail said that the absence of PTI from elections deprived it from being able to claim proportional representation in the National Assembly. Further saying that the SIC could become a parliamentary group but not be allocated reserved seats from its merger with PTI-backed independents. On the ECP's allocation of reserved seats, he said the commission failed in its constitutional duty. Justice Musarrat Hilali commented "How can a political party claim reserved seats when it did not win even one seat in the election?", the lawyers of the People's Party responded that the SIC did not contest elections. Justice Bilal inquired if PTI could legally benefit from the Supreme Court ruling as it was not party to the case, CJP Yahya Afridi also said that PTI was not formally a part of the case.
