= Military Courts case =

Pakistani Legal Case

Jawwad S. Khawaja v. Federation
- Court: Supreme Court of Pakistan
- Full case name: Jawwad S. Khawaja v. Federation of Pakistan
- Decided: October 23, 2023; 2 years ago
- Citation: PLD 2024 SC 337

Case history
- Appealed to: Supreme Court of Pakistan (intra-court appeal; larger bench)
- Subsequent action: Ruling overturned in Shuhada Forum Balochistan v. Jawwad S. Khawaja by 5-2 majority

Ruling
- Trial of civilians by court martial are declared unconstitutional; all ongoing trials by military courts are set aside; Brigadier F. B. Ali v. The State is distinguished.

Court membership
- Judges sitting: Ijaz-ul-Ahsan; Munib Akhtar; Yahya Afridi; Mazahar Ali Akbar Naqvi; Ayesha A. Malik

Case opinions
- 3
- Majority: Munib Akhtar, Ayesha A. Malik, joined by unanimous bench
- Concurrence: Ayesha A. Malik, Yahya Afridi
- Dissent: Yahya Afridi to the extent of striking down § 2(1)(d) of the Pakistan Army Act, 1952 and distinguishing F. B. Ali

Laws applied
- Articles 8(3), 8(5), 10A, 175(3) and 184(3) of the Constitution; § 2(1)(d) of the Pakistan Army Act, 1952

Jawwad S. Khawaja v. Federation of Pakistan, PLD 2024 SC 337 (commonly referred to as the military courts case), is a landmark decision by the Supreme Court of Pakistan in which it was held that the Constitution of Pakistan does not allow for the court-martial of civilians.

The case concerned the constitutionality of military courts set up to try protestors accused of involvement in the May 9 riots that ensued from the arrest of former prime minister Imran Khan. The Supreme Court was petitioned in its original jurisdiction by lawyer Aitzaz Ahsan, retired chief justice of Pakistan Jawwad S. Khawaja, and the parents of the accused; arguments before the Court proceeded from June to October 2023.

On 23 October 2023, the Court issued a unanimous decision striking down ongoing trials by military courts and, by a majority of 4-1, held that § 2(1)(d) of the Pakistan Army Act, 1952 enabling such trials was unconstitutional. It also held that the accused 103 persons would be tried by civilian courts under ordinary criminal law. The decision was celebrated by legal experts, human rights groups, and civil society as 'brave' and 'truly historic'.

The judgment was challenged by federal and provincial caretaker governments before a larger bench, in the first appeal of its kind under the newly passed Practice and Procedure Act, 2023. The formation of the appellate bench by Chief Justice Qazi Faez Isa was controversial, and the inclusion of the head of the bench, Justice Sardar Tariq Masood, objected to for having opposed the same petitions earlier. The new bench suspended the ruling, stating that the trials of civilians would continue in military courts.

On 8 May 2025, the appellate bench, having since been reconstituted as a Constitutional Bench under the Twenty-Sixth Amendment, overturned Jawwad S. Khawaja by a 5-2 majority, validated the trials, and restored § 2(1)(d). The reversal was widely denounced by lawyers as a 'judicial surrender'.

== Background ==
=== History of military trials of civilians in Pakistan ===
Military courts commenced in independent Pakistan to try religious leaders in the aftermath of the Lahore riots of 1953 and the imposition of city-wide martial law (the sentences were nullified when martial law was lifted the same year).

==== Ayub-era inclusions and F. B. Ali ====
The trial of civilians by court martial was formalised in 1967 during the military dictatorship of Ayub Khan, in the form of § 2(1)(d) and § 59(4) being incorporated in the Pakistan Army Act, 1952. The provisions were applied shortly thereafter to retired Brigadier F. B. Ali, who was handed a life sentence for attempting to overthrow prime minister Zulfikar Ali Bhutto (Ali had also been linked earlier to sparking unrest within the military during the fall of the Yahya Khan regime).

When Ali eventually moved the Supreme Court in F. B. Ali v. The State, his appeal was dismissed in 1975 by a 5-member bench headed by chief justice Hamoodur Rahman; the decision would be used to justify the court-martial of civilians in subsequent cases, and formed the subject of extensive judicial discussion in Jawwad S. Khawaja over its value as precedent. Ali was released by the Zia-ul-Haq regime in 1978, after serving five years in prison.

==== Legal provisions ====
The Ayub-era inclusions to the Army Act read:

- § 2(1)(d): “persons not otherwise subject to this Act who are accused of seducing or attempting to seduce any person subject to this Act from his duty or allegiance to government, or having committed, in relation to any work of defence, arsenal, naval, military or air force establishment or station, ship or aircraft or otherwise in relation to the naval, military or air force affairs of Pakistan” can be tried under the secrets act.
- § 59(4): “Notwithstanding anything contained in this Act or in any other law for the time being in force a person who becomes subject to this Act by reason of his being accused of an offence mentioned in clause (d) of subsection (1) of section 2 shall be liable to be tried or otherwise dealt with under this Act for such offence as if the offence were an offence against this Act and were committed at a time when such person was subject to this Act; and the provisions of this section shall have effect accordingly.”

Military tribunals would continue trying civilians under the martial law of military dictator Zia-ul-Haq. They were also instituted in Sindh by the government of Nawaz Sharif following the assassination of provincial governor Hakim Said in 1998, but they were struck down by the Supreme Court in Liaquat Hussain v. Federation of Pakistan, a decision authored by Chief Justice Ajmal Mian.

==== Twenty-first amendment ====
Military courts were again instituted by the Nawaz Sharif ministry in the aftermath of the 2014 Peshawar school massacre carried out by the Tehreek-i-Taliban Pakistan, with the aim of dispensing speedy justice to terrorists. The move was enabled by the passage of the 21st Constitutional Amendment in 2015 with a sunset clause of 2 years. In January 2017, at the end of the originally stipulated period, a further amendment was made to the constitution to allow the military courts to function for two more years. That provision of the amendment expired in January 2019 and was not renewed.

The courts were subject to widespread procedural criticism: trials were conducted under the Judge Advocate General (JAG) branch of the Pakistan Army in which the judges and prosecutors were all serving military officers with no formal legal training. The opaqueness of the military justice system was also pointed out by the United Nations and International Commission of Jurists. The proceedings were conducted within military establishments in secrecy and defendants only had the right to appeal the verdict of a military court to a military appellate tribunal, whose decision in turn would be deemed final and beyond challenge in Pakistan's superior courts.

The Twenty-first amendment was challenged in May 2015 by senior lawyers Hamid Khan and Asma Jahangir in District Bar Association (Rawalpindi) v. Federation of Pakistan. However, their petitions were dismissed by a majority of 11 to 6, allowing for military courts to complete two consecutive two-year terms. Among the dissident judges who ruled against the court-martial of civilians was Jawwad S. Khawaja.

=== History of the case ===
After Imran Khan's violent arrest by paramilitary Rangers on 9 May 2023 from within the premises of the Islamabad High Court, protests spread across the country. In some instances protestors targeted military installations, including the General Headquarters (GHQ) in Rawalpindi and Corps Commander house at Lahore. Several thousand Pakistan Tehreek-e-Insaf leaders and workers were arrested in response, of which 102 defendants had their cases shifted from anti-terrorism courts to military courts.

==== Petitioners and counsel ====
This move was subsequently challenged by several petitioners as unconstitutional, including lawyer Aitzaz Ahsan, former chief justice of Pakistan Jawwad S. Khawaja, and the parents of the accused. The counsel for the petitioners included Khawaja Ahmad Hosain and Rida Hosain representing Justice Khawaja, Latif Khosa representing Aitzaz, Uzair Bhandari representing Imran Khan, Salman Akram Raja and Asad Rahim Khan representing the parents, and Faisal Siddiqi representing rights activist Karamat Ali.

The counsel for the state was Attorney-General for Pakistan Mansoor Usman Awan, with Khawaja Haris Ahmad representing the Ministry of Defence.

== Hearing the case ==
=== Bench composition ===
Chief Justice Umar Ata Bandial initially formed a 9-member larger bench to hear the case. However, upon the onset of proceedings on 23 June 2022, Justice Qazi Faez Isa "rose" from the bench and stated that he did not "consider the 9-member bench a bench" and left the hearing. He was of the view that the Chief Justice should first decide the matter of Supreme Court Practice and Procedure Bill, 2023 before constituting new benches. He was supported by fellow sitting judge, Tariq Masood, in exiting from the courtroom.

On 26 June 2023, Justice Mansoor Ali Shah recused himself from the bench after the Federal Government, represented by Attorney General, Mansoor Awan, raised objection over him being related to one of the petitioners, former Chief Justice of Pakistan, Jawwad S. Khawaja.

The final bench consisted of 6 judges; Chief Justice Umar Ata Bandial, and Justices Ijaz-ul-Ahsan, Munib Akhtar, Yahya Afridi, Mazahar Ali Akbar Naqvi, and Ayesha A. Malik. J. Bandial retired on 17 September 2023 while the hearing of the case was ongoing.

== Supreme Court decision ==
"Lord Atkin, in one of his most well-known speeches (a famous dissent instantly recognizable), said that in England, even amid the clash of arms, the laws were not silent, that they spoke the same language in peace and in war. Delivered in 1941, the opinion has resounded through the decades and is set to echo down the ages. It was the direst of times, the darkest of hours. Great Britain and her Allies were engaged upon a titanic, globe-spanning struggle against the Axis Powers. Though (the utterances of some to the contrary notwithstanding) things in this country at the present time are, by the Grace of the Almighty, not at all comparable to the perilous times in which Lord Atkin protested (“even though I do it alone”), in their own way the issues raised are nonetheless stark and compelling. For the question put to the Court is this: in respect of fundamental rights, in relation to the trial of civilians by courts martial whatever the circumstances may be, what is the language of the Constitution? What language should—nay, must—the Constitution speak? Very respectfully, the petitioners ask: what says the Court?"

— Justice Munib's opening reference was to World War II-era precedent Liversidge v. Anderson

On 23 October 2023, the bench announced a unanimous verdict that called for the trial of May 9 riots suspects to be conducted in ordinary courts. The court further declared Section 2(1)(d) of the Army Act, which elaborates on persons subject to the Act, to be in violation of the Constitution and “of no legal effect”. The court also declared Section 59(4) (civil offences) of the Act to be unconstitutional.

=== Reactions ===
The verdict was widely hailed by lawyers, civil rights activists, and legal experts. Human Rights Commission of Pakistan (HRCP) warmly welcomed the decision, saying in a tweet: “Military courts do not meet the standards of fair trial, nor are such trials likely to be impartial or independent, as the administration of justice warrants.” Pakistan Tehreek-i-Insaf (PTI) spokesperson Raoof Hassan hailed the judgement saying the order will help transfer cases of their workers from the military courts to the ordinary criminal courts.

On 14 November 2023, Senator Dilawar Khan with the support of the pro-establishment, Balochistan Awami Party, passed a resolution against the verdict. The resolution was not part of the daily agenda and was tabled when most of the senate's members were absent from the floor. In the ensuing sessions, on 18 and 22 November, senators protested the hasty passage of the resolution. Senator Mushtaq Ahmad termed it a "drone attack" on the Senate. Senator Raza Rabbani decried the way the resolution was "bulldozed" through the senate with only 12 of the 100 senators present when it was tabled. Chairman of Senate, Sadiq Sanjrani, prevented the tabling of a resolution in support of the verdict, stating that the matter has now become subjudice.

On 18 November 2023, the caretaker government, under Anwarul Haq Kakar, filed an intra-court petition against the verdict. Related appeals were filed by caretaker governments of Khyber Pakhtunkhwa and Baluchistan as well as the defense ministry, under Lieutenant General (r) Anwar Ali Hyder. On 22 November 2023, the caretaker government of Punjab, under Mohsin Naqvi, also challenged the verdict.

== Appeal ==
=== Bench formation controversy ===
In response to the intra-court appeals filed against the ruling, the new Chief Justice, Qazi Faez Isa, constituted a 6-member bench on 12 December 2023. The bench consisted of Justices Sardar Tariq Masood, Aminuddin Khan, Muhammad Ali Mazhar, Hasan Azhar Rizvi, Musarrat Hilali, and Irfan Saadat Khan. The composition of the bench drew criticism from Justice Ijazul Ahsan who was part of the 3-member committee to fix benches, stating that he was bypassed by Isa in violation of section 2 of the Supreme Court Practice and Procedure Act, 2023.

Former Chief Justice Jawwad S. Khawaja, a petitioner in the case, objected to the inclusion of Justice Sardar Tariq Masood as head of the new bench, stating that he had earlier recused himself from the bench hearing the original petition.

=== Suspension ===
On 13 December 2023, the bench suspended the earlier ruling in a 5–1 majority decision, with J. Musarrat Hilali dissenting, stating that the trials of 103 civilians will continue in military courts. Meanwhile, stating that military courts would not issue a final verdict against the suspects.

=== Appellate decision ===
On 8 May 2025, the appellate bench, having since been reconstituted as a Constitutional Bench under the Twenty-Sixth Amendment, overturned Jawwad S. Khawaja by a 5-2 majority, validated the trials, and restored § 2(1)(d). The reversal was widely denounced by lawyers as a 'judicial surrender'.

== See also ==
- May 9 riots
