= Yahya Afridi =

Chief Justice of Pakistan since 2024 (born 1965)

- یحییٰ آفریدی

30th Chief Justice of Pakistan
- Incumbent
- Assumed office 26 October 2024
- Appointed by: Asif Ali Zardari
- Preceded by: Qazi Faez Isa

Justice of the Supreme Court of Pakistan
- Incumbent
- Assumed office 28 June 2018

Chief Justice of the Peshawar High Court
- In office 30 December 2016 – 28 June 2018

Justice of the Peshawar High Court (Note: Originally elevated as an additional judge, confirmed as a Permanent Justice on 15 March 2012)
- In office 15 March 2010 – 28 June 2018

Personal details
- Born: 23 January 1965 (age 61) Dera Ismail Khan, West Pakistan, Pakistan
- Relations: Omar Afridi (Father); Monowar Khan Afridi (Grandfather)
- Education: Aitchison College; Government College, Lahore; University of the Punjab; University of Cambridge

Supreme Court of Pakistan, Islamabad.

Yahya Afridi (Urdu: یحییٰ آفریدی; born 23 January 1965) is a Pakistani jurist who has been serving as the chief justice of Pakistan since 26 October 2024. He previously served as a Justice of the Supreme Court of Pakistan since 28 June 2018. Prior to his elevation to the Supreme Court, Afridi was the chief justice of the Peshawar High Court from 2016 to 2018, and a justice of that high court from 2010 to 2016. Early in his legal career he worked as a private lawyer, enrolling in various provincial and federal level legal posts. Afridi is the first Chief Justice of two Apex Courts (Supreme Court and Peshawar High Court) having family roots in those areas of present-day Khyber Pakhtunkhwa that were once the Federally Administered Tribal Areas. He is also the first chief justice to be appointed under the articles of the 26th Amendment to the Constitution of Pakistan, being nominated by a Special Parliamentary Committee on 22 October 2024.

== Early life and education ==
Afridi was born on 23 January 1965 in Dera Ismail Khan, Pakistan. He is a member of the Adamkhel Afridi tribe, with his family originally from Babari Banda village in Dara Adam Khel Tehsil (formerly the Frontier Region Kohat). He was educated in Lahore at Aitchison College, obtaining his O-and-A levels, before completing his Bachelor of Arts in political science and economics degree at Government College University, Lahore in 1985. Afridi obtained a Bachelor of Laws and Master of Arts in economics degrees in 1988 to 1989 from the University of the Punjab and the Punjab University Law College. After he acquired a Commonwealth Scholarship, Afridi received a Master of Laws at Jesus College, Cambridge University in 1990. In 1991 he was selected for the Commonwealth Young Lawyers Course at the Institute of Legal Studies, London. From 1991 to 2005 Afridi acted as a visiting professor in law at the Khyber Law College, University of Peshawar, teaching labour, international and administrative law.

Afridi's grandfather was Monowar Khan Afridi, who by partition was serving as a discretionary position of a Local Brigadier in the British Indian Army's Medical Corps and also a malariologist listed in the Munks Roll of the Royal College of Physicians. After Partition Monawar Afridi opted to join Pakistan Army and continued to serve the country in the health. Monawar was one of the founders of the health and medical education system in Pakistan, notably established Khyber Medical College in Peshawar while also serving as the vice-chancellor of Peshawar University.

From January 2013 to September 2013, he served on the Board of Governors of Aitchison College and from May to September 2013 as a member of the Peshawar University of Engineering & Technology Senate/Syndicate.

== Career ==
=== Private practice ===
He interned at Fox & Gibbons in London before returning to Pakistan, where he became an Associate at Orr, Dignam & Co. in Karachi. While in private practice as a lawyer, Afridi enrolled as an Advocate of the High Court in 1991, three years later he became Assistant Advocate General for the province of Khyber Pakhtunkhwa (then NWFP). In 1995 he became Federal Counsel for the Government of Pakistan. In 2004 he enrolled as Advocate of the Supreme Court of Pakistan. From 1997 to 2012 he was a partner of Afridi, Shah & Minallah Law Firm, together with Mansoor Ali Shah and Athar Minallah.

=== Justice of the Peshawar High Court ===
In 2010 Afridi was elevated to the Peshawar High Court bench as an additional judge, and later confirmed as a permanent justice of the PHC on 15 March 2012. From 2011 to 2014 he served as Inspection Judge for several district courts and Chairman of Abbottabad and PHC enrollment committees from 2011 to 2014. From June 2010 to May 2013 Afridi was chairman of the KPK Labour Appellate Tribunal and in May 2013 became Chairman of the Khyber Pakhtunkhwa Subordinate Judiciary Service Tribunal.

He served as Company Judge for the Abbottabad Circuit Bench between 2011 and 2013 and continued as company judge in the Peshawar High Courts even after elevation to Chief Justice. In April 2011 Afridi became the head of the Automation Committee of the PHC and served as a member for several judicial committees, including; the SC's National Judicial Automation Committee, Committee for Enhancing Environmental Justice, and on the PHC Administrative Committee. In 2014, he became an administrative/monitoring judge in the Anti-Terrorism Courts and senior puisne judge.

=== Chief Justice of the Peshawar High Court ===
On 30 December 2016, he took the oath as Chief Justice of the Peshawar High Court, the first from FATA and the youngest CJ in the courts history. In Abid Ali VS The State etc (2018 PLD), Afridi ruled that the Prevention of Corruption Act of 1947, being person-specific, meant that a petitioner could not "absolve himself" of wrong-doing "on the mere ground that the said law has not been extended to FATA, where he was then serving". Determining the validity of anti-corruption laws in FATA/PATA.

=== Justice of the Supreme Court ===
In December 2018, Afridi was elevated into the Supreme Court of Pakistan (SCP). He, together with ten other judges endorsed the Supreme Court (Practice and Procedure) Act, although he held a dissenting note on some points. On the Military Courts case, he held that section 2(1)(d)(ii) of the Pakistan Army Act (PAA) did not apply to civilian on May 9 and 10, and thereupon could not be tried in military courts, further stating that several sections of the PAA were Ultra vires and "therefore of no legal effect". In Jawwad S. Khawaja v Federation of Pakistan (2024 PLD 337 Supreme Court) he stated “….the trial of civilian protesting……in. [sic] incidents of the 9th and 10th of May 2023 may be proceeded strictly under the relevant criminal laws applicable to civilians; but there is nothing on record to even suggest that they so acted with the intention or object of causing damage to the defence of Pakistan." Despite this Afridi did not support the majority verdict. Afridi held a dissenting note against the majority verdict in the Reserved Seats Case, holding that the SIC was not eligible for seats, but rather the Supreme Court should treat the reserved seats candidates as PTI members. He further dissented that the SC could not issue "definitive directions" to the Election Commission. In previous hearings over reserved seats, he remarked "It makes an effect on me when I read it." Referring to Article 3 of the Constitution of SIC which "restricts the membership of SIC to only adult Muslims".

=== Chief Justice of Pakistan ===
On 26 October 2024, Yahya Afridi took was sworn in as Chief Justice of Pakistan at the Aiwan-i-Sadr, where President Zardari administered the oath. The same day he reconstituted the three-man Supreme Court Committee with justices Mansoor Ali Shah and Munib Akhtar under the Supreme Court (Practice and Procedure) Act, 2023. The Supreme Court's cause list stated that the new Chief Justice would hear 968 cases in his first week. The CJP also scheduled meetings with the administrative judges of Anti-Terrorism Courts (ATCs) and the Supreme Judicial Council (SJC) for November 7–8 and ordered live-streaming in all of the SCP's courtrooms. On October 29 a full court session presided over by Afridi approved a scheme based on Justice Mansoor's one-month "Case Management Plan 2023" to dispose of the Supreme Court's current 59,191 pending cases. The next day Mansoor Ali Shah was nominated as Chairman of the Alternate Dispute Resolution (ADR) Committee. These measures have been seen as attempts to unify the apex court after a period of polarisation and internal conflict and overturn the constitution of "like-minded" benches.

The appointment of Yahya Afridi under the clauses of the Twenty-Sixth amendment led to a "split" in the legal community - with his selection supported by the Supreme Court Bar Association (SCBA), Khyber Pakhtunkhwa Bar Council (KPBC), Sindh Bar Council (SBC), and the Sindh High Court Bar Association (SHCBA); but opposed by the Karachi Bar Association (KBA), Balochistan Bar Council (BBC), Pakistan Bar Council (PBC), Balochistan High Court Bar Association (BHCBA), Quetta Bar Association (QBA) and the Lahore High Court Bar Association. Pakistan Tehreek-e-Insaaf (PTI) leader Shoaib Shaheen on October 24 stated that while PTI had no “personal objection” to Afridi, the party would challenge the constitutional amendment. Later on October 31, PTI Chairman Gohar Ali Khan "wholeheartedly" accepted Afridi as CJP and denied that the party would call for his resignation. Previously on October 22, Afridi's selection was supported by Pakistan Muslim League–Nawaz (PMLN), Pakistan Peoples Party (PPP), Muttahida Qaumi Movement–Pakistan (MQM-P), opposed by Jamiat Ulema-e-Islam–Fazl (JUI-F) and boycotted by PTI/SIC.

== Personality ==
According to Umar Cheema in The News International, "Justice Afridi doesn't watch news channels, let alone vlogs. He has zero consumption of social media. He uses a burner phone. He watches movies and drama series, mostly foreign. He is fond of polo and golf, hence watches videos related to them." According to the President of the Supreme Court Bar Association (SCBA) Shahzad Shaukat, there is “no doubt that Justice Yahya Afridi is one of our best judges”. Former Addl. Attorney General Tariq Mehmood Khokhar stated, "More often than not, he finds himself unable to agree with the views of either side, neither the majority nor the minority". An editorial by Ikramul Haq, Huzaima Bukhari and Abdul Raoof Shakoori in Business Recorder called Afridi a "sober, dignified and independent-minded judge" who "possesses in-depth knowledge of maladies faced by our justice system".

== Papers ==
- Accountability Laws in Pakistan, Program on Law for Business Executives, LUMS, March & December, 2005
- Forest Laws in Khyber Pakhtunkhwa, ICEEJ, Bhurban, March 2012
- Cyber Crime and Legislation, International Conference “Peace through Law”, Lahore, Oct. 2012
- Human Rights & Terrorism in Pakistan, February 2014
- Presentation on Witness Security Symposium, Bhurban, June 2014
- Judiciary in Khyber Pakhtunkhwa, Presentation to Participants of 101st National Management Course, August 2014

== Conferences ==
- Asia Crime Prevention Conference, New Delhi, India, November 1999
- National Judicial Conference, Supreme Court, Islamabad, 2010
- National Judicial Conference, Supreme Court, Islamabad, April 2011
- International Conference on Enhancing Environmental Justice (ICEEJ), Bhurban, March 2012
- International Judicial Conference, Supreme Court, Islamabad, April 2012
- National Criminal Law for Judges, The Hague Forum, The Hague, Netherlands, May 2012
- Human Rights & Terrorism in Pakistan, February 2014
- Pakistan Judicial Tour to United Kingdom, March 2014
- Witness Security Symposium at Bhurban, June 2014
- Conference on Water and Environment Justice at Lahore, June 2014
- 3rd South Asia Judicial Roundtable on Environmental Justice, Colombo, Sri Lanka, August 2014

Preceded by Qazi Faez Isa	Chief Justice of Pakistan; 2024–	Succeeded by Incumbent
