= Supreme Judicial Council of Pakistan =

Superior judicial body in Pakistan

The Supreme Judicial Council of Pakistan is a judicial body of the superior judiciary of Pakistan. It is empowered under Article 209 of the Constitution of Pakistan, to hear cases of misconduct against judges.

== Constitutional composition ==
The composition of the Council is set out in the Constitution as:

- The Chief Justice of Pakistan;
- The two next most senior judges of the Supreme Court of Pakistan;
- The two most senior Chief Justices of the High courts.

In case of the council investigating one of its members, the member in question is replaced by the next most senior judge.

== Current composition ==
Name	Retirement	Qualifying criteria	Comments
Yahya Afridi	25 October 2027	Chief Justice of Pakistan	
Aminuddin Khan	13 November 2028	Chief Justice of Federal Constitutional Court	
Munib Akhtar	13 December 2028	Senior most judge of Supreme Court	
Jamal Khan Mandokhail	11 November 2026	Second Senior most judge of Supreme Court	
Hasan Azhar Rizvi	1 November 2030	Senior most judge of Federal Constitutional Court	
Aalia Neelum	11 November 2028	Senior most chief justice of a provincial high court (Lahore High Court)	
Sardar Muhammad Sarfraz Dogar	2 July 2030	Second senior most chief justice of a provincial high court (Islamabad High Court)	
Mr. Muhammad Saleem Khan		Secretary of the Council	Member in virtue of being Registrar of the Supreme Court

== Powers ==
No judge of any of the five High Courts or of the Supreme Court of Pakistan may be dismissed except by the President on the report of the Supreme Judicial Council. The Council may start proceedings against a judge either by its own initiative or by reference from the President of Pakistan.

If the Council concludes that the judge is guilty of misconduct and should be removed from office, it can recommend this to the President.

A judge of a court or tribunal subordinate to a High Court may be dismissed by the High Court concerned.

== List of judges referenced to Supreme Judicial Council ==
Name	Court	Reasons	Result
Iftikhar Muhammad Chaudhry	Supreme Court of Pakistan		Acquitted
Shaukat Aziz Siddiqui	Islamabad High Court	Speech against military and ISI On March 22, 2024, Supreme Court ruled that the dismissal of former Islamabad High Court Judge Shaukat Aziz Siddiqui was unlawful and he shall be considered as a retired Judge.	Retired and Acquitted
Qazi Faez Isa	Supreme Court of Pakistan	Purchase price of one property not cited	Acquitted
Muhammad Farrukh Irfan Khan	Lahore High Court	Offshore company reported in Panama Papers	Resigned
Muhammad Anwar Khan Kasi	Islamabad High Court		Acquitted
Sayyed Muhammad Mazahar Ali Akbar Naqvi	Lahore High Court	SJC proceedings continued in light of SC decision and opinioned that he was guilty of misconduct and should have been removed as a Judge. The Ministry of Law and Justice (Pakistan) issued a notification effectuating his removal.	Removed
Mazhar Iqbal Sidhu	Lahore High Court		Resigned
