= Qazi Faez Isa =

Pakistani jurist (born 1959)

- قاضی فائز عیسیٰ

Chief Justice of Pakistan
- In office 17 September 2023 – 25 October 2024
- Appointed by: Arif Alvi
- Preceded by: Umar Ata Bandial
- Succeeded by: Yahya Afridi

Justice of the Supreme Court of Pakistan
- In office 5 September 2014 – 25 October 2024

Chief Justice of Balochistan High Court
- In office 5 August 2009 – 4 September 2014
- Preceded by: Amanullah Khan Yasinzai
- Succeeded by: Ghulam Mustafa Mengal

Justice of the Balochistan High Court
- In office 5 August 2009 – 4 September 2014

Personal details
- Born: 26 October 1959 (age 67) Quetta, Balochistan, Pakistan
- Spouse: Sarina Isa
- Children: 2
- Parent: Qazi Muhammad Isa (father)

Qazi Faez Isa (Urdu: قاضی فائز عیسیٰ, pronounced [qaːziː faez iːsaː]; born 26 October 1959) is a Pakistani jurist who served as the 29th Chief Justice of Pakistan (CJP) from 17 September 2023 to 25 October 2024. He was appointed as a justice of the Supreme Court in 2014, having previously served as the chief justice of Balochistan High Court from 2009 to 2014.

During his tenure as Chief Justice of the Supreme Court, Isa faced significant controversies, including rulings criticised by political and religious groups, allegations of election interference and electoral fraud, banning political parties during elections, and making amendments to the Supreme Court's hierarchy and succession rules. Additionally, there was backlash over his judgment supporting changes to Supreme Court procedures, which faced accusations of consolidating power within his office. His rulings also received criticism for allegedly encouraging political floor-crossing. During his tenure, judges also faced allegations of being threatened and intimidated by military officials, raising further concerns about judicial independence. His tenure has been described by the critics as one of the "darkest periods for justice" in Pakistan. He was also criticised by other Supreme Court justices for undermining the independence of the judiciary.

== Early life and education ==
Isa was born in Quetta, West Pakistan on 26 October 1959 to Qazi Muhammad Isa and Begum Saida Isa. His paternal grandfather, Qazi Jalaluddin, was a Hazara of the Sunni sect belonging to the Sheikh Ali tribe, and was a judge in Kandahar who was forced to flee Afghanistan at the end of the 19th century, in protest against the persecution of Hazaras during the reign of Abdur Rahman Khan. Jalaluddin settled in Pishin in Baluchistan in what was then British India, and served as the prime minister of the princely state of Kalat. Isa's paternal grandmother was a Pashtun of the Tareen tribe. His mother Begum Saida Isa was a social worker who belonged to a Muhajir family in Karachi, with roots in Lucknow.

Isa's father, Qazi Muhammad Isa, was a prominent Pakistan Movement activist and a close associate of Muhammad Ali Jinnah, serving as the president of All-India Muslim League's Balochistan chapter, and as the youngest member of Muslim League's Central Committee. He represented Balochistan in the 1940 Lahore Resolution.

The diplomat Ashraf Jehangir Qazi is his first cousin, and Jennifer Musa, an Irish-Pakistani social worker was his aunt through marriage to his paternal uncle Qazi Muhammad Musa.

He completed his primary and secondary education in Quetta, did his "O" and "A" levels from Karachi Grammar School and went on to do B.A. (Honours) in Law, from London. He did his Bar professional examination from the Inns of Court School of Law, London, and was called to the Bar of England and Wales (Middle Temple, 1982).

== Legal career ==
Isa enrolled as an Advocate of the Balochistan High Court on 30 January 1985 and as an Advocate Supreme Court on 21 March 1998.

He practiced law for over 27 years before all the High Courts of Pakistan, the Federal Shariat Court, and the Supreme Court of Pakistan, and was a member of the Balochistan High Court Bar Association, Sindh High Court Bar Association and Life Member of the Supreme Court Bar Association of Pakistan. Before his elevation, he was a senior partner and head of litigation in one of Pakistan's leading law firms. From time to time he was called upon by the High Courts and the Supreme Court as amicus curiae, and rendered assistance in certain complicated cases. He has also conducted international arbitrations. Innumerable cases, in which he appeared as Counsel, have been reported in law journals.

=== Balochistan High Court ===
After the proclamation of emergency of 3 November 2007, Isa elected not to appear before judges who had violated their oath. Subsequently, after the Supreme Court declared the action of 3 November 2007 unconstitutional, all the then judges of the High Court of Balochistan tendered their resignation, and on 5 August 2009, Justice Isa was directly elevated to the position of Chief Justice of the High Court of Balochistan.

At the time of elevation, Justice Isa was the solitary judge in the Balochistan High Court. He thus nominated Judges to re-establish the Court, and re-opened the court in Sibi and Turbat. He went on to upgrade all courts in Balochistan, focusing on facilitating access and providing facilities to the public. Isa served as a member of the Pakistan Law and Justice Commission, the National Judicial (Policy Making) Committee and the Federal Judicial Academy. In his capacity as the Chief Justice of the Balochistan High Court, he was also the ex-officio Chairman of the Balochistan Judicial Academy. As the senior most Chief Justice of a High Court Isa served as a member of the Supreme Judicial Council.

=== Supreme Court of Pakistan ===
Justice Qazi Faez Isa took oath as a judge of the Supreme Court of Pakistan on 5 September 2014, where he was the chief justice of Pakistan.

He strongly dissented in the case of District Bar Association Rawalpindi v Federation of Pakistan, which enabled the trial of civilians by military court. In the case of Sindh Revenue Board v Civil Aviation Authority, he held that 'neither the Federation nor the provinces should invade upon the rights of the other nor encroach on the other's legislative domain'.

In the case of suo moto proceedings regarding eligibility of the chairman, Sindh Public Service Commission, Justice Isa directed the Government of Sindh to 'ensure complete transparency in the process of selection and appointment respectively' of qualified candidates, as their 'performance and work would be far superior to the inept allowed in through the back door of nepotism and/or corruption'.

Justice Isa addressed illegalities in government projects in Suo Moto Case no. 19 of 2016, in which he observed that 'a small clique of persons is put in charge of these massive funds, avoiding established methods of checks and balances and circumventing the prescribed manner of implementing and executing of projects/schemes'.

In the case of Khalid Humayun v NAB, Justice Isa castigated the National Accountability Bureau for entering into a plea bargain with a government servant who was caught red handed with a large amount of cash. He held that 'the acceptance of the plea bargain by the chairman runs counter to the stated object [of the NAB Ordinance] to 'eradicate corruption and to hold accountable all those persons accused of such practice'; instead, the message that emanates from NAB is that, if one surrenders only the amount which was seized he will be let off. The rising tide of insidious corruption devastates lives; this Court has repeatedly noted and warned about it, but it seems to no avail'.

Justice Isa was appointed by the Supreme Court as a single Judge Commission regarding terrorist attacks in Quetta on 8 August 2016 wherein 75 people (a majority of whom were lawyers) were killed. Justice Isa submitted the resultant Quetta Commission Report on 13 December 2016. In the judgment of Principal Public School Sangota v Sarbiland, the case of a girls school being attacked by terrorists was addressed by Justice Isa, condemning acts of terrorism by using Islamic injunctions regarding education and non violence.

In the Faizabad dharna judgment, Justice Isa addressed the constitutional right to free movement and the unconstitutional interference of intelligence agencies in Pakistan's political system. Within the judgment, it was observed that free publicity for extremist parties, and the broadcast of inflammatory speeches had allowed for protests to turn violent and spread across Pakistan. Justice Isa held that rights cannot be exercised by infringing on those of others. Thus, meetings or sit-ins could not be held on public roads without requisite permission. Censorship of the media was noted as unconstitutional, and it was held that 'no one, including any government, department or intelligence agency can curtail the fundamental right of freedom of speech, expression and press beyond the parameters mentioned in Article 19 of the Constitution.' Justice Isa held that 'politicking, and manipulation of media undermines the integrity of the armed forces', and that 'perception of ISI's involvement in matters that are not its concern remains'.

The case of Salamat Mansha Masih v The State involved the bail application of a Christian sanitary worker accused of blasphemy. Justice Isa held that 'abiding by Islamic jurisprudential principles, applying the constitutionally guaranteed right to a fair trial and due process, and acting prudently to ensure that an innocent is not convicted wrongly in respect of offences relating to religion, when there is only the improbable oral testimony of witnesses, then there must be corroboration'. Amnesty International described the judgment as 'a flicker of hope for human rights in South Asia'.

In Shah Zaman v Government of Khyber Pakhtunkhwa, Justice Isa addressed the importance of forests in ecological preservation and mitigating the effects of climate change in light of Islamic injunctions.

In the military courts case, dealing with trials of civilians by military courts under Army Act 1952, Justice Isa was part of the initial larger bench formed by Chief Justice Umar Ata Bandial. However, at the onset of proceedings Jutice Isa rose from the bench, stating that "he did not consider the 9-member bench a bench". Despite Chief Justice Bandial requesting him to remain seated, he left the courtroom. Justice Isa's 30-page note explaining his reasoning for this was removed from the Supreme Court website. In it he stated that the Chief Justice should first decide the matter of Supreme Court Practice and Procedure Act (2023), which dealt with the constitution of benches and right to appeal, before the merits of any case could be heard by the bench.

=== Presidential reference ===
In May 2019, 3 months after the release of the Faizabad dharna judgment, the President of Pakistan, on the advice of the Prime Minister, Imran Khan filed a reference against Justice Qazi Faez Isa. The reference was later struck down by the Supreme Court.

It was alleged that properties belonging to Justice Isa's wife, Mrs. Sarina Isa, were actually his own, without issuing notice to her, or hearing her point of view. Mrs. Isa successfully challenged the order, establishing that she had an independent means of livelihood and was a separate taxpayer, since she started working in 1981.

In its detailed judgment, the Supreme Court found that the Reference filed against Justice Isa had been in 'wanton disregard of the law', with 'glaring lapses and procedural irregularities in the filing of the reference'.

In April 2022, former Prime Minister Imran Khan admitted that the filing of the reference against Justice Isa had been a 'mistake', and that 'relevant officials had misguided his government about the facts of the case'.

However, the government had filed a 'curative review' seeking review of the Supreme Court's decision. In July 2022, the Federal Cabinet led by Prime Minister Shahbaz Sharif announced that it would withdraw the 'curative review'. This was done so in March 2023, with Prime Minister Sharif observing that the reference had been 'on flimsy and political grounds', and 'meant to harass and intimidate'. In July 2023, a petition against the withdrawal of the review was dismissed by Chief Justice Umar Ata Bandial.

=== Transparency and disclosure ===
In response to a freedom of information request by the Women's Action Forum, Justice Isa was the only judge who published details of all his assets, income, and privileges on the Supreme Court website. His wife, Mrs. Sarina Isa also voluntarily did so.

=== Chief Justice of Pakistan ===
He was notified as the next Chief Justice of Pakistan on 21 June 2023 by President Arif Alvi. On 17 September 2023, he took oath as the 29th Chief Justice of Pakistan at a ceremony in Aiwan-e-Sadr. He is set to remain the Chief Justice until 25 October 2024.

In the Aitzaz Ahsan v The State case dealing with the issue of missing persons who are extra-judicially abducted by the country's security agencies, J. Isa was being presented a list of the individuals belonging to the Pakistan Tehreek-e-Insaf (PTI) who had been abducted in the wake of the May 9 riots. At this he remarked, "if you can't stand the heat in the kitchen you should not be in the kitchen", before chastising the lawyer for making the case political. Further during the hearing, the case of Imran Riaz and his 4-month long disappearance was brought up, at which J. Isa remarked, "Who is he?". The next day, Riaz offered to come to the courtroom at the guarantee of security to narrate what had happened to him in custody. In response, J. Isa, stated that "the apex court doesn't have force, and if he wants to give statement, they would not stop him". During the proceeding, J. Isa has resolved to fix the issue of missing persons "once and for all".

In Sardar Qaisarani vs The State, the matter of lifetime disqualification from public office under article 62(1)(f) of the constitution is subjudice. J. Isa has termed the disqualification "against Islam", while stating "how can the court close the door to repentance if the God didn't". On 9 January 2024, the bench under J. Isa announced a 6-1 majority verdict with J. Yahya Afridi dissenting. The verdict set aside the earlier interpretation of lifetime disqualification for the article, stating that it violated fundamental rights, and instead set a 5-year disqualification for lawmakers who fail the moral standard of "sadiq and ameen" (honest and righteous). The timing of the verdict ensured that lawmakers disqualified from running for public office under 62(1)(f) in earlier judgements were eligible to contest the upcoming 2024 elections. Prominent among these are former prime minister, Nawaz Sharif, who was disqualified in the Panama Papers case in 2017 and Jahangir Tareen, the chief of Istehkam-e-Pakistan Party, who was disqualified the same year for concealment of assets.

In November 2023, Isa reconstituted the National Judicial Automation Committee (NJAC), a sub-committee of the National Judicial Policy Making Committee (NJPMC) with the claimed goals to work for digitisation of the court processes and records, introduce mobile applications and improve case management as well as introduce AI in legal processes and research.

On 3 October 2023, Isa conducted hearings on the Supreme Court (Practice and Procedure) Act 2023, which had been previously blocked from implementation by former Chief Justice Umar Ata Bandial. The outcome of the hearing diminished the Chief Justice's sole authority to form Supreme Court benches, instead sharing this power among the three most senior judges of the Supreme Court, including the Chief Justice.

A three-judge bench headed by CJP Isa had taken up the Monal group's appeal against a IHC judgement on the Margalla Hills Monal Restaurant. During the hearing J. Isa questioned the legality of the Restaurant and the Remount Veterinary and Farms Directorate (RVFD) functioning under General Headquarters (GHQ), remarking that the "Land belongs to govt, not army," and further stated "the court can call even the former army chief to ask him when this meeting was held. This property belongs to the people of Pakistan, and not the military." On 22 March, the Attorney General conceded the lease was void as the RVFD was not a legal entity.

On 6 May it was announced that the Supreme Court would resume hearings of the Federal Governments review petition in the Faizabad dharna case after a special commission formed to investigate the TLP submitted its report to the government. The bench will consist of Isa, Irfan Saadat Khan, and Naeem Akhtar Afghan. Isa called the report "disappointing," and questioned Attorney General (AGP) Mansoor Usman Awan if anyone belonging to the TLP was summoned, he also inquired how many times Gen. Faiz Hameed was summoned to which AGP Awan responded "once," with the Attorney General mentioning that they had sent a questionnaire to the retired General, leading to the CJP to state "Army is a part of this government. How did it become sacred?"

Isa claimed it appeared that the commission aimed to exonerate Faiz Hameed. Isa questioned the inclusion of members of the Police into the commission equating it to "asking a thief if you did not steal anything." Isa added that the report had failed to draw any conclusions and said that the inquiry commission wasted time, asserting that the Faizabad dharna case verdict been implemented, the incident of 9 May would not have happened. The Supreme Court described the report as "replete with clichés, platitudes, and homilies, often as a substitute for substance."

The three-member bench of the Supreme Court of justices Isa, Irfan Saadat Khan and Naeem Akhtar Afghan on 17 May issued show-cause notices to Independent Senator Faisal Vawda and MQM-P MNA Syed Mustafa Kamal over their remarks on Justice Babar Sattar and the 'ethical standards' of the judiciary. The CJP stated "If [I] have done wrong then name me [but] will not allow the institution (judiciary) to be targeted," further stating "What is the need to shout and put on a show? Do constructive criticism. Are you serving the institution by screaming and shouting?" Following the issue of the show-cause notices Isa commented "Let's summon both [so] they can criticise us in front of us." The Court clarified that while the constitution (Article 19) grants the right to free speech, it places restriction in regard to contempt of court, citing Article 204 and Contempt of Court Ordinance (2003).

According to a BOL News article, Imran Khan "maintained that the Chief Justice of Pakistan Justice Qazi Faez Isa was an upright and brave," but asked why the CJP why the petitions of 9 May and 8 February were not being taken up. Pakistan Tehreek-e-Insaf (PTI) accused CJP Isa of collusion with the government for not allowing the hearing of the NAB amendments case from being broadcast.

== Controversies ==
=== PTI intra-party elections case ===
On 13 January 2024, less than a month before the general elections, a three-member Supreme Court bench led by Isa upheld the decision of the Election Commission of Pakistan (ECP), overturning a prior reversal of the ECP's order by a bench of the Peshawar High Court (PHC). The initial ECP order, citing alleged irregularities in PTI's intra-party elections conducted on 2 December 2023, rendered them ineligible to keep their election symbol, the cricket bat.

=== Proscribed literature case ===
Chief Justice Isa faced criticism from major religious parties, including Jamaat-e-Islami and Jamiat Ulema-e-Islam, over his verdict in a case of dissemination of banned Ahmadiyya literature. In the case, Isa released an accused, who had been incarcerated since 2019, setting aside an earlier Lahore high Court ruling while stating "courts must exercise caution in matters of faith". Adherents of Ahmadiyaa faith are officially declared as non-Muslims in the constitution of Pakistan and have faced persecution and marginalization in the country for claiming to be Muslims. In an official response, the Court clarified that the ruling is being misrepresented and that it does not go against the second amendment of the constitution and that the accused was released because he had already served the maximum sentence for the offense.

=== Elections 2024 rigging allegations ===
On 17 February 2024, Commissioner Rawalpindi, Liaquat Ali Chattha, in a press conference accused Isa to be involved in rigging of General Elections 2024. Later while talking to reporters, Isa denied these allegations. Following the presser, Chattha was arrested and shifted to an unknown location. On 22 February 2024, he apologized for his allegations while claiming that PTI exerted pressure on him to discredit Isa.

=== 2024 IHC letter controversy ===
In March 2024, six serving judges of the Islamabad High Court (IHC) wrote a letter addressed to CJP Isa, alleging interference by the Inter-Services Intelligence (ISI) in judicial matters. The letter documented instances of pressure on judges through the abduction and torture of their relatives and secret surveillance within their residences. Despite that, he would later go on to remark that he has received not "a single complaint of interference from any high court" during his tenure.

=== 2024 Supreme Court Practices and Procedure Ordinance ===
While he was the senior puisne judge, CJP Isa championed the original 2023 Supreme Court Practices and Procedure (SCPP) bill that allowed for a 3-member committee consisting of the Chief Justice and two senior-most budges to form benches instead of it only being the chief. He continued to speak in favour of the law when elected Chief Justice Ultimately, giving a judgment that upheld its passage in parliament. However, on 21 September 2024, within hours of an ordinance being passed by President Zardari that dismisses the requirement of seniority for the third-member of the committee, CJP Isa replaced Justice Munib Akhtar with Justice Aminuddin Khan, the fifth judge in the court's seniority list. This move gave Isa majority in the committee, after he was earlier struggling to get his way. The presidential ordinance was later challenged in multiple courts for being unconstitutional and concentrating power in the hands of the Chief Justice. The move also drew comparisons with CJP Isa's earlier remarks against ordinances as he perceived them as tools for "imposing one man's will on the nation", referring to the fact that they bypass the parliament. In the first meeting of the committee since the changes made by CJP Isa, the second most senior member, Justice Mansoor Ali Shah, left the court without attending it.

=== Interpretation of article 63-A ===
Former president Arif Alvi criticised Isa, alleging that he fostered an environment encouraging floor-crossing, which Alvi claimed was motivated by a desire to extend his tenure.

== Personal life ==
Isa is married to Sarina Isa, a former teacher at the Karachi American School, with whom he has two children, a son, Arslan Isa, and a daughter, Sehar Isa. In 2021, Sarina Isa and their children were accused by the Government of Pakistan through a presidential reference of owning properties in London that had not been declared in the family's income. The case was later closed by the subsequent PMLN-led government.

== Writings ==
Justice Isa regularly wrote for Pakistan's English newspapers. He co-wrote the book Mass Media Laws and Regulations in Pakistan and wrote the report: Balochistan: case and demand.

== Bibliography ==
- Pakistan Journal of History and Culture, Volume 19, Pakistan: National Institute of Historical and Cultural Research, 1998, p. 124
