= Mazhar Alam Miankhel =

Pakistani judge (born 1957)

Mazhar Alam Miankhel مظهر عالم میانخیل

Justice of the Supreme Court of Pakistan
- In office December 30, 2016 – July 13, 2022
- Nominated by: Mamnoon Hussain

Chief Justice Peshawar High Court
- In office April 8, 2014 – December 29, 2016
- Nominated by: Mamnoon Hussain
- Preceded by: Mian Fasihul Mulk
- Succeeded by: Yahya Afridi

Justice Peshawar High Court
- In office November 17, 2011 – April 7, 2014
- Nominated by: Asif Ali Zardari

Personal details
- Born: 14 July 1957 (age 69) Dera Ismail Khan

Mazhar Alam Miankhel (Urdu:مظهر عالم میانخیل) is a former Justice of the Supreme Court of Pakistan and a former Chief Justice of Peshawar High Court. He served as a judge of Peshawar High Court from 2011 to 2014 and later held the position of Chief Justice of the same court from April 8, 2014. He retired as a Supreme Court judge on July 13, 2022.

== Early life and education ==
Justice Mazhar Alam Miankhel, was born on 14 July 1957 in DI Khan. He completed his secondary education from B.I.S.E. Peshawar in 1973. He then went on to graduate from Gomal University, DI Khan in 1979 and obtained his law degree from the said University in 1982.

== Professional career ==
Justice Miankhel began his legal career by enrolling as an Advocate of the Lower Courts in 1982. In 1984, he became an Advocate of the High Court and later in 2003, he enrolled as an Advocate of the Supreme Court of Pakistan. Throughout his career, Justice Miankhel held various positions of responsibility. He served as vice president and Secretary of the District Bar Association in Dera Ismail Khan. He also held the same positions in the High Court Bar Association, Dera Ismail Khan Bench. Additionally, he was a member of the N.W.F.P. Bar Council, now known as Khyber Pakhtunkhwa Bar Council for two sessions, from 1999 to 2003 and from 2004 to 2009. From 1998 to 2000, he worked as a visiting part-time Lecturer in the Law College at Gomal University, Dera Ismail Khan. Furthermore, he provided legal advice to different firms, institutions, and banks.

== Judicial career ==
Mazhar Alam was promoted to the PHC bench as an additional judge in 2009 and made permanent judge in 2011. He was appointed as Chief Justice of the Peshawar High Court on 8 April 2014 following the retirement of Justice Fasihul Mulk. During his tenure as a judge, he held several important positions and appointments.

Mazhar Alam Miankhel, during his tenure, expressed concerns and raised important observations regarding the actions of President Arif Alvi, former Prime Minister Imran Khan, and other leaders of the Pakistan Tehreek-e-Insaf (PTI) party. In his additional note on the SC's judgment on the deputy speaker of the National Assembly's ruling to dismiss the no-trust resolution against Imran Khan, Justice Miankhel pointed out that the exercise of authority was violated and the trust was breached by these individuals.

He called upon the parliament to consider invoking Article 6 of the constitution, which pertains to high treason, against President Alvi, PTI chief Imran Khan, former speaker of the assembly Asad Qaiser, former deputy speaker Qasim Suri, and former law minister Fawad Chaudhry. He argued that their actions, which derailed the process of the no-confidence motion against Imran Khan, were contrary to the spirit of the constitution and impeded parliament's right to pursue such motions.

He retired from the Supreme Court on 13 July 2022.

On 19 July 2024, his name was considered by the Judicial Commission of Pakistan (JCP) for an appointment as an ad-hoc judge of the Supreme Court. On the day of the JCP meeting, he declined the offer. However, the JCP still approved his nomination in a 6–3 vote and decided to again consult him for his consent. On 27 July, he agreed to become an ad-hoc judge.

Legal offices
Preceded by Mian Fasihul Mulk	Chief Justice of Peshawar High Court; April 8, 2014 – December 30, 2016	Succeeded by Yahya Afridi
