= Hamza Muhammad Khawaja v. Federation of Pakistan =

Hamza Muhammad Khawaja v. Federation of Pakistan is an ongoing landmark case in the Supreme Court of Pakistan concerning the restoration of student unions and the removal of the ban on student indulgence in politics. The case challenges a 1993 Supreme Court judgment that outlawed student politics across the country.

== Background ==
In 1992, the Supreme Court of Pakistan issued an interim order prohibiting student involvement in politics, citing incidents of violence. Under this order, students and their parents or guardians were required to sign an affidavit pledging to refrain from political activities, failing which admission to educational institutions would be denied. Violations of this commitment could result in expulsion without prior notice.

This legal framework was solidified in 1993 when the Supreme Court delivered its judgment in M. Ismail Qureshi v. M. Owais Qasim, Secretary General Islami Jamiat-e-Talaba Pakistan. The ruling upheld the mandatory affidavit and prohibited student groups from affiliating with mainstream political parties. Additionally, it barred students from holding positions in university statutory bodies, thereby restricting their role in policy-making alongside university administrations.

Nearly three decades later, Hamza Muhammad Khawaja, a student from the Law School of the Lahore University of Management Sciences (LUMS) and president of the LUMS Student Policy Research Initiative, led a student movement advocating for the restoration of student unions, culminating in a petition filed in the Supreme Court, challenging the long-standing ban on student political participation and seeking its removal.

== Petition ==
The petition challenges the ban on student unions, arguing that such restrictions violate Article 17 of the Constitution, which guarantees the fundamental right to freedom of association. It also highlights a key contradiction: if students are granted the right to vote at 18, how can they be denied the ability to unionize and engage in politics within the very institutions meant to shape them as active and informed citizens?

== Judges' Reactions ==
A six-member bench of the Supreme Court, led by Justice Aminuddin Khan, heard the case. During the proceedings, Justice Jamal Mandokhail noted that Quaid-e-Azam University had issued a schedule for student union elections, suggesting that these elections could serve as a pilot project.

Justice Mandokhail also remarked that political influence extended even to bar elections, with political parties establishing their wings in educational institutions. Justice Muhammad Ali Mazhar inquired whether a formal ban on student unions existed and when it had been imposed, emphasizing that student unions were not solely about politics but also about student welfare.

Justice Hassan Azhar Rizvi highlighted that student unions had contributed to violence at Karachi University, leading to the deployment of Rangers for 35 years. In response, lawyer Umar Gilani stated that the Rangers had been stationed at Karachi University under special circumstances.

Justice Amin-ud-Din Khan acknowledged that student unions played a formative role, as their members would eventually assume responsibilities in national governance. Justice Rizvi suggested that solutions should be pursued through dialogue with responsible student representatives.

Justice Musarrat Hilali questioned the necessity of involving students in politics, emphasizing the importance of focusing on education. The bench subsequently issued notices to the respondents and adjourned the hearing to a later date.

== HEC's Announcement/Reforms ==
On 20th May 2025, the Higher Education Commission of Pakistan announced that in response to the Supreme Court’s decision restoring student unions under Article 17(1) of the Constitution, HEC convened a key meeting to review and refine a proposed framework for student representation in universities. The meeting was held under the Committee formed by the Ministry of Federal Education & Professional Training.

The framework outlines structure, eligibility, election processes, financial oversight, a code of conduct, and an independent steering committee for compliance. University feedback included clarifying voting rights, limiting involvement in sensitive matters, and extending representation to faculty-level boards.

HEC Executive Director Dr. Zia Ul-Qayyum emphasized incorporating feedback before submitting the proposal to the Ministry. The initiative represents a move toward responsible, structured student leadership in Pakistan’s higher education system.
