= Liaquat Ali Chattha =

Pakistani civil servant

Commissioner of Rawalpindi Division
- In office 29 January 2023 – 17 February 2024

Personal details
- Born: Hafizabad, Punjab, Pakistan
- Children: Two sons
- Profession: Civil Servant

Liaquat Ali Chattha is a Pakistani civil servant in PMS-20 Grade who recently served as the Commissioner of Rawalpindi Division.

Born in Hafizabad, Punjab, he began his civil service career in 1992 as an Executive Magistrate. He held various positions, including deputy secretary at the Chief Minister's Secretariat and deputy commissioner in multiple cities in Punjab. He also served as secretary of various departments in the Punjab Government. Until February 2024, he was the Commissioner of Rawalpindi Division, resigned after admitting involvement in 2024 Pakistani general election.

== Career ==
Chattha, originally from Hafizabad, Punjab, began his civil service career as an executive magistrate in 1992. During his tenure, he held various positions in Faisalabad, notably as executive district officer finance from 1992 to 2012.

He then served as deputy secretary at the Chief Minister's Secretariat during the tenure of former Punjab chief minister Shehbaz Sharif. During his tenure at Chief Minister's Secretariat, he fulfilled the role of PSO to Hamza Shahbaz.

Later he held positions as deputy commissioner in Gujrat Reportedly, a business tycoon from Gujrat influenced the appointment of Chattha as the Gujrat deputy commissioner. In March 2017, he was appointed as deputy commissioner Sargodha.

He served as secretary for Labor & Human Resource department in the Government of Punjab from September 2021 to December 2021 and again from 19 May 2022 till August 2022.

On 29 August 2022, he assumed the role of commissioner in Dera Ghazi Khan.

In September 2022, Chattha was posted as secretary for Housing, Urban Development, and Public Health in the Government of Punjab.

He was serving as a member of Punjab Revenue of Board, before posted as Commissioner of Rawalpindi Division on 29 January 2023.

During his career, Chattha provided facilities at gymkhanas and general bus stands in Gujrat, Dera Ghazi Khan, and Rawalpindi. Additionally, while serving in Rawalpindi, he re-initiated various projects, including the Ring Road, Daducha Dam, Chahan Dam, Pirwadhai Bus Stand, and Safe City.

As per Dawn, senior officials of the Punjab government described Chattha as a "hardworking officer".

== 2024 Pakistani general election ==
He rose to prominence on 17 February 2024, more than a week after the 2024 Pakistani general election, when Chattha resigned from his post of Commissioner of Rawalpindi Division after admitting his role in electoral fraud in the division where 11 out of a total of 13 national assembly seats were won by Pakistan Muslim League (N) (PML-N) candidates. He claimed his office helped candidates, who were trailing in the actual vote counts by approximately 70,000 votes per candidate, to secure victory using fake stamps. He implicated Chief Election Commissioner (CEC), Sikandar Sultan Raja and Chief Justice of Pakistan (CJP), Qazi Faez Isa in the scheme. The Election Commission of Pakistan denied the allegations, saying that divisional commissioners had no direct role in the electoral process, and said it would launch an inquiry. Isa rejected the commissioner's allegation, calling them "baseless".

During a press conference, Chatha also said that he felt "pressure" to the extent that he considered suicide in the morning. However, he ultimately decided to present matters before the public. Punjab's caretaker Information Minister Amir Mir dismissed the allegations made by Chatha and said that he was suffering from mental illness. The PML-N raised concerns about Chattha's mental condition with Rana Sanaullah Khan calling him a "psycho". Reportedly, Chattha had strong relations with Sanaullah.

Senior officers at his office said Chattha did not show any signs of depression in the week prior to his announcement and that he had been attending to his regular duties at the office, including a meeting with PML-N MNA-elect Hanif Abbasi the day before, which focused on resolving sanitation and water shortage issues in Rawalpindi.

Following his press conference, Chattha was arrested by the police. His office was sealed, and he was shifted to an undisclosed location. Following Chatha's statement, X (formerly Twitter) was subsequently blocked in Pakistan.

The Pakistan Tehreek-i-Insaf (PTI) and its allies called for the resignation of the election commissioner as well as the chief justice, while the Pakistan Peoples' Party demanded an investigation into the allegations.

Reportedly, Chattha was scheduled to retire as Commissioner of the Rawalpindi Division on 13 March 2024.

While authorities insist that a division commissioner have no role in the election process in Pakistan however, there are concerns about their potential unofficial influence on election conduct, which sparked a new debate in the country.

On 22 February, In a letter to the ECP, Chattha expressed regret for false allegations of electoral manipulation he made on 17 February. He issued an apology to the Election Commission, retracting these inaccurate claims of rigging. He alleged that PTI exerted pressure on him to make these claims. He admitted that the name of the Chief Justice of Pakistan was invoked to sow distrust among the general public against him. It was reported that Chattha has not been seen since his press conference on 17 February and the circumstances surrounding the writing of the letter addressed to the ECP and Chattha's current whereabouts remain unknown.

== Corruption allegations ==
According to investigative journalist Umar Cheema, Chattha has close ties with the PTI and former ISI director general Faiz Hameed. Cheema claimed special directives were issued to favor Chattha on multiple occasions during Faiz's tenure in the ISI.

Reportedly, he is under investigation in a total of 11 corruption cases. One of these cases involves Chattha's purported involvement in the fraudulent acquisition of land meant for Imran Khan's sister, Uzma Khanum.

Raja Riaz, a leader of the Pakistan Muslim League (N) (PML (N)) and former opposition leader, has accused Chattha of corruption, alleging that Chattha received Rs 250 million and a flat in New York from overseas Pakistanis. Riaz asserted that Chattha had a history of corruption during his 20-year tenure in Faisalabad. Riaz further alleged that Chattha falsely accused the CEC and CJP of corruption near his retirement. He called for Chattha's name to be placed on the Exit Control List (ECL) and for an inquiry to be initiated. Riaz also claimed that Chattha's last posting was facilitated by Usman Buzdar for Rs 50 million.
