= Shahid Waheed =

Justice of the Lahore High Court (born 1966)

- شاہد وحید

Justice of the Supreme Court of Pakistan
- Incumbent
- Assumed office 11 November 2022
- Nominated by: Judicial Commission of Pakistan
- Appointed by: President of Pakistan

Justice of the Lahore High Court
- In office 27 March 2012 – 10 November 2022
- Preceded by: Ayesha Malik
- Succeeded by: Aalia Neelum

Personal details
- Born: 25 December 1966 (age 59)

Shahid Waheed (Urdu: شاہد وحید; born 25 December 1966) is a Pakistani jurist currently serving as a judge of the Supreme Court of Pakistan since 11 November 2022. He previously served as a judge of the Lahore High Court, from 27 March 2012 to 10 November 2022.

== Elevation to Supreme Court of Pakistan ==
Justice Waheed's elevation from the Lahore High Court to the Supreme Court was approved by the Judicial Commission of Pakistan on 24 October 2022.
