= Sair Ali =

Pakistani judge (born 1947)

Muhammad Sair Ali (Urdu: ثائر علی, born 19 November 1946) is a Pakistani former judge, and professor of law who served as a justice of the Supreme Court of Pakistan from 2009 until his retirement in 2011. Prior to the appointment to the Supreme Court, he served as the Lahore High Court judge from 2001 until 2008. He has also played a role in the lawyers' movement in Pakistan. On 4 August 2014, he was appointed as the acting chairman and election commissioner of the Pakistan Cricket Board.
