= Supreme Court (Practice and Procedure) Bill 2023 =

Pakistani Law

- Long title: A bill to regulate the practice and procedure of the Supreme Court of Pakistan
- Passed: 10 April 2023
- Introduced by: Azam Nazeer Tarar

The Supreme Court (Practice and Procedure) Bill 2023 was approved by the Parliament of Pakistan on 10 April 2023. The proposed law suggests that a panel formed by a Committee consisting of the most senior judges, led by the Chief Justice of Pakistan, will handle and conclude all cases, appeals, or issues presented before the Supreme Court. The act was moved by Law Minister Azam Nazeer Tarar.

== Background ==
On 29 March 2023, the legislation was approved by the National Assembly, bypassing a referral to the pertinent standing committee. This occurred one day after the Senate 's endorsement of the bill. President Arif Alvi sent the bill back to the Parliament twice, urging for a second evaluation. However, on 10 April 2023, the bill was successfully ratified once more, accompanied by specific modifications, amidst a boisterous demonstration by lawmakers affiliated with the PTI.

== The Bill ==
The intent of the 2023 Act related to the Practices and Procedures of the Supreme Court is to delegate the authority for initiating suo motu actions to a committee composed of three distinguished judges, among them the chief justice. Additionally, the Act seeks to establish transparent protocols for hearings within the highest court and encompasses provisions for the exercise of the right to appeal.

== Controversies ==
The legislation is currently under legal scrutiny and has been postponed indefinitely. Justice Qazi Faez Isa, the most senior subordinate judge, expressed that he is unable to participate in a Supreme Court panel until a decision is rendered in the matter of the Supreme Court (Practice and Procedure) Bill 2023. A fervent discussion has emerged among legal experts, political groups, and legal analysts regarding the legality of this recently passed law.
