= Sardar Tariq Masood =

Pakistani judge

- سردار طارق مسعود

Justice of the Supreme Court of Pakistan
- In office 5 November 2015 – 10 March 2024
- Nominated by: President of Pakistan

Judge of Lahore High Court
- In office 14 September 2009 – 4 November 2015

Personal details
- Born: 11 March 1959 (age 67) Kalar saydan, Rawalpindi, Punjab, Pakistan

Sardar Tariq Masood (Urdu: سردار طارق مسعود; born 11 March 1959) is a former Pakistani jurist who served as the acting Chief Justice and the senior Justice of the Supreme Court of Pakistan. He retired from office on 10 March 2024.

He remained a Judge of the Lahore High Court before being elevated to the Supreme Court. He retired as the senior most Justice of the Supreme Court of Pakistan.

Justice Sardar is a former ad-hoc Justice of the Supreme Court of Pakistan, he assumed office on 29 July 2024 and retired on 28 July 2025.

== Early life and education ==
He was born in the village of Saroha, in the Tehsil Kallar Syedan, Rawalpindi District. After earning his legal degree, Sardar began practicing law in the Rawalpindi District in 1985. In 1987, he was admitted as an advocate to the High Court.

== Career ==
Justice Tariq began practicing law in the Rawalpindi District in 1985 and was admitted as an Advocate of the High Court in 1987. In 2008, he was promoted to Advocate of the Supreme Court. He continued to serve as President of the District Bar Association of Rawalpindi. Since joining the Lahore High Court in September 2009, Sardar has contributed to numerous published judgements and taken on a variety of administrative duties.

Sardar previously served as Inspection Judge for the Districts of Khanewal, Vehari, Pakpattan, and Hafizabad. A member of the Lahore High Court's administration committee, and judge in the consumer protection courts, drug courts, and labor courts.

On 18 July 2024, his name was considered by the Judicial Commission of Pakistan (JCP) for an appointment as an ad-hoc judge of the Supreme Court. His name was approved by the JCP in a 8-1 vote.
