= May 9 riots =

2023 violent incidents in Pakistan

- Part of 2022–2024 Pakistan political unrest, 2023 Pakistani protests and Arrest of Imran Khan
- Date: May 9, 2023; 3 years ago
- Location: General Headquarters, Pakistan. Corps Commander House, Lahore
- Goals: Release of Imran Khan
- Methods: Protests, acts of vandalism, arson, riots
- Result: Government victory: Thousands of rioters arrested; Key PTI leaders imprisoned

Parties
PTI supporters and protesters	Government of Pakistan; Islamabad Police; (Punjab, Pakistan) Government of Punjab; Punjab Police; Government of Khyber Pakhtunkhwa; Khyber Pakhtunkhwa Police; Government of Sindh; Sindh Police; (Balochistan, Pakistan) Government of Balochistan; Balochistan Police; Pakistan Rangers; Pakistan Rangers (Punjab); Pakistan Rangers (Sindh); Frontier Corps; Frontier Corps Khyber Pakhtunkhwa (North)

Lead figures
Imran Khan; Bushra Bibi; Omar Ayub; Shibli Faraz; Yasmin Rashid; Faiz Hameed	Shehbaz Sharif; Rana Sanaullah; Mohsin Naqvi; Azam Khan; Murad Ali Shah; Abdul Quddus Bizenjo

Casualties and losses
8-14 killed	232 policemen injured
- Multiple civilian deaths Hundreds of civilians injured

Casualties
- Arrested: Over 3,200

Following the arrest of the Pakistan Tehreek-e-Insaf (PTI) leader and former prime minister of Pakistan, Imran Khan, from the grounds of the Islamabad High Court, nationwide demonstrations held by PTI's supporters descended into violent riots on 9 May 2023. According to the government, incidents of vandalism and arson resulted in Rs. 2.5 billion (US$8.9 million) worth of damage inflicted to government and military facilities by PTI workers and members of the public.

As the protests descended into violence and chaos and protestors began attacking law enforcement officers and public buildings, the government responded with a cellular service and internet blockade and a crackdown against the rioters, PTI leaders, workers, and supporters, as well as those perceived to be allied to the party's cause within the media and legal fraternity. Trials of civilians within military courts were also initiated and are being challenged in the country's Supreme Court. The government also accused former Inter-Services Intelligence director Lt Gen Faiz Hameed of planning the riots in collaboration with Imran Khan.

== Background ==
Imran Khan, the PTI leader and former Pakistani prime minister, was arrested by paramilitary troops on 9 May 2023 in the jurisdiction of Islamabad High Court. The arrest came in view of multiple legal cases against Khan, including the Toshakhana case, which accused him of unlawfully selling gifts received from foreign dignitaries; the Cipher case, which alleged he disclosed a classified diplomatic cable; and the Al Qadir Trust Case, in which Khan was accused of using his position as prime minister to facilitate a settlement between the Pakistani government and businessman Malik Riaz after the UK's NCA returned approximately £190 million (US$239 million) to Pakistan. In exchange, Riaz allegedly donated 458 kanals of land to the Al-Qadir University Trust, a charity associated with Khan and his wife, Bushra Bibi. In response, PTI supporters and workers - who believe the arrest was politically charged - began to demonstrate against Khan's arrest in a number of cities, including in Karachi, Lahore, Islamabad, Rawalpindi, Sargodha, Gujranwala, Faisalabad, and Multan.

== Riots and violence ==
Acts of arson, vandalism, and assaults on governmental and military facilities were committed by the rioters, with 62 documented outbreaks of violence, and approximately 40 public buildings and military installations were damaged in the aftermath.

Among the buildings attacked and damaged in the riots were the Lahore Corps Commander's House (Jinnah House) and Askari Tower in Lahore, the General Headquarters (GHQ) in Rawalpindi, an Inter-Services Intelligence (ISI) office in Faisalabad, a Frontier Corps fort in Chakdara, a toll plaza at Swat Motorway, and the Mianwali Air Base. A Radio Pakistan building in Peshawar was attacked, stormed, and set on fire by rioters as well, leaving one employee hospitalized with serious burns.

Reporters trying to cover the protests in Peshawar were also attacked by protesters. The satellite transmission vehicles of Dawn News TV, Aaj News, Khyber News and Express News were subjected to rock throwing and baton attacks by rioters. A Dawn News TV truck was badly damaged and journalist Arif Hayat was injured by flying glass. Express News reporter Vishal Khan was also among those attacked by protesters.

Punjab Police, utilizing geo-fencing reports, accused key PTI leaders of orchestrating attacks on the residence of the Lahore corps commander and other critical locations. Police alleged that over 400 calls were made by PTI leaders directing the rioters toward these targets. Inspector General of Police Punjab, Dr. Usman Anwar, confirmed the deployment of geo-fencing to monitor these communication and he alleged Imran Khan as a principal suspect in planning the assaults. Additional PTI leaders implicated were Hammad Azhar, Yasmin Rashid, Mehmood-ur-Rasheed, Ejaz Chaudhary, Mian Aslam Iqbal, and Murad Raas, all allegedly in contact with the rioters, providing precise directives for the attacks.

Anti-terrorism legislation was used, and numerous prosecutions were filed against those allegedly responsible for the riots. Multiple PTI workers were killed by law enforcement officers who fired live ammunition; one died in Quetta and four were killed in Peshawar. Along with several deaths, hundreds of rioters and law enforcement officers sustained injuries.

== Governmental response ==
The Punjab Home Department established 53 Joint Investigation Teams (JITs) made up of police personnel to investigate the cases reported in relation to the riots thoroughly in reaction to the mounting violence. With the consent of the Punjab cabinet subcommittee on law and order, several JITs were created. Each JIT was given a prosecutor from the prosecution department to help with the investigation.

== Arrests and proceedings ==
Over a thousand people have reportedly been arrested in connection with the rioting in Lahore alone, according to reports from the Punjab Police (Pakistan). According to reports, around 3,200 suspected rioters were detained across Punjab, Pakistan. Numerous cases were reported to the police, the bulk of which were covered by anti-terrorism regulations. The most severely affected cities were Lahore, Rawalpindi, Sargodha, Gujranwala, Faisalabad, and Multan, with variable numbers of cases reported in each place.

== Aftermath ==
=== Crackdown against the PTI ===
A crackdown was initiated against PTI leaders and workers, with thousands arrested, with rights groups raising concerns regarding arbitrary arrests, custodial torture, and forced disappearances. PTI leaders were forced to quit party/party positions in televised press conferences. Businesses of PTI leaders who did not quit the party were sealed. Family members of PTI leaders who went into hiding were harassed by police and military intelligence forces. In many instances, their houses were raided late at night and ransacked; valuables were also seized; the dowry for Mian Aslam Iqbal's daughter's wedding was seized by Punjab Police; and the homes of Lal Chand Malhi and Ali Nawaz Awan were demolished. A crackdown was also initiated on vocal women supporters of Khan's party - the most prominent of which was Khadija Shah, a businesswoman and granddaughter of former Pakistani Army Chief, Asif Nawaz Janjua. Former Federal Ministers, Shehryar Khan Afridi and Ali Muhammad Khan, former Governor Punjab Omer Sarfraz Cheema, and former Punjab provincial ministers, Yasmin Rashid and Mehmood-ur-Rasheed have been incarcerated since the end of the riots. Even once released by the courts, they were immediately re-arrested in other cases; Khan has been rearrested six times, while Afridi, and Rashid have been rearrested twice. Cheema's wife was arrested as she came to attend her husband's hearing. Afridi was not allowed to attend his brother's funeral and was kept in inhumane conditions in a 'death cell' reserved for those on death row.

=== Media censorship and abduction of journalists ===
Mobile internet coverage was suspended as riots spread throughout the country. The ban effected gig workers, including those working for Uber, Foodpanda, and Careem, as well as freelancers and remote workers who relied on mobile internet. It was estimated that during the three days that mobile internet remained suspended, Pakistan's telecom companies bore a loss of Rs. 2.49 billion (US$8.9 million), while the country's software export industry lost Rs. 10 billion (US$36 million). Starting from 13 May 2023, the authorities started restoring Internet access. The ban was criticized by GSMA as it urged to restore internet services in the country.

Access to social media, including Facebook, Twitter, and YouTube, was also restricted in the aftermath of the riots. Both the blockage of internet and social media were implemented by Pakistan Telecom Authority after a notification for the same was issued by the interior ministry, under Rana Sanaullah. Access to social media was fully restored by 16 May 2023. However, the government has hinted at another social media blockage with defense minister, Khawaja Asif, claiming that "the script of the May 9 violence was prepared via social media".

The Intercept reported that several leading media houses were called to a secret meeting by the Pakistan Army in which they were directed to ban all coverage of Imran Khan. As a result, Khan's name disappeared overnight from all local print and electronic media, with journalists euphemistically referring to him as "Qasim ke Abba" (Qasim's father) as the moniker became a top twitter trend in Pakistan.

A few days after Imran's arrest, senior military officials reportedly summoned media leaders to a meeting in Islamabad, where they were instructed to avoid airing Imran's name and images. This directive was reinforced by Pakistan's media regulator, prohibiting coverage of Imran or PTI.

Journalists that were seen as aligned with the PTI were targeted. Imran Riaz Khan, one of the most popular journalists on Pakistani social media, was kidnapped from outside Sialkot Central Jail on 11 May 2023 after being initially detained by Punjab Police. He has since remained missing as the chief of Punjab Police, Usman Anwar, put the blame on military agencies for his disappearance in front of the Lahore High Court, and expressed his inability to locate the journalist. Another prominent journalist, Sami Ibrahim, head of Bol News was picked up from Islamabad on 24 May 2023 before being released on 30 May. Reporters without Borders and the International Federation of Journalists raised concern over the abductions.

In January 2026, an anti-terrorism court convicted and sentenced eight journalists and social media commentators to life imprisonment in absentia for terrorism-related offences linked to online content supporting Imran Khan. The court ruled that their digital activity "promoted fear" and unrest under anti-terrorism laws. Those sentenced include former army officers who later became YouTubers, Adil Raja and Syed Akbar Hussain, along with journalists Wajahat Saeed Khan, Sabir Shakir and Shaheen Sehbai, as well as commentator Haider Raza Mehdi and political analyst Moeed Pirzada. Saeed Khan, describing the ruling as 'political theatre', stated that he was never served a summon or notified of any proceedings, and never contacted by the court. The Committee to Protect Journalists (CPJ) had labelled the investigations as a retaliatory act against critical reporting in 2023.

=== Trials of civilians in military courts ===
In the immediate aftermath, the administration attempted to transfer a number of cases to military courts for trial due to the seriousness of the crimes committed during the riots. Four accused people involved in targeting defense sites had their transfer allowed by an anti-terrorism court in Faisalabad, while eight accused people involved in the attack on the General Headquarters (GHQ) had their transfer granted by an ATC in Rawalpindi. Additionally, the commanding officer received 16 suspects, among them an ex-PTI Member of the Provincial Assembly (MPA), who was charged with looting and vandalizing Corp Commander House in Lahore.

Later, trials of as many as 102 defendants, who were deemed to be involved in attacks on military installation, were transferred from anti-terrorism courts to military courts. The move drew widespread criticism as military courts have been deemed as opaque systems shrouded in secrecy with little regard for human rights and legal Procedures due process by both the United Nations and International Commission of Jurists. Several constitutional petitions were made before the Supreme Court of Pakistan to declare the trials unconstitutional, including by the former Chief Justice Jawwad S. Khawaja, who deemed it as "militarization of justice". Pakistan People's Party leader and prominent lawyer, Aitzaz Ahsan, was also one of the petitioners as he considered the move as "a complete anathema to the constitutional separation of powers, the independence of the judiciary, the inalienable right of every Pakistani to be treated in accordance with law, and the fundamental rights of life, liberty, fair trial, and due process". Imran Khan, also filed a civil petition separately. The petitions have been clubbed together into a military courts case with a 6-member Supreme Court larger bench hearing it.

=== Targeting of lawyers ===
The legal fraternity, particularly those demanding the upholding of the Constitution of Pakistan and cessation of trials of civilians in military courts, were also targeted. A prominent lawyer, Uzair Bhandari, was abducted and later released after he left Imran Khan's residence after consulting with him on the matter of military courts. The house of Advocate Latif Khosa, former Governor of Punjab, was attacked by armed men after he made a speech against the interim government in Punjab and the trial of civilians in military courts.

=== Judicial Inquiry Demands ===
After the 2024 general elections, several political figures advocated for a judicial inquiry into the May 9 riots. Ali Amin Gandapur, the newly elected Chief Minister of Khyber Pakhtunkhwa (KP), demanded a judicial inquiry in his inaugural speech. Bilawal Bhutto Zardari, Chairman of the PPP, endorsed Gandapur's call for a judicial inquiry during a session of the National Assembly. However, Ahsan Iqbal, leader of the PMLN, expressed conditional support for a judicial inquiry. He voiced his backing only if the inquiry also investigated similar incidents involving the PTI.

=== Court cases ===
Following the events, Imran Khan was released after the Supreme Court of Pakistan declared his arrest as 'illegal'. Khan remained free until he was arrested again on several cases, with many being from the military alleging Khan had relation to the riots. The Lahore High Court concluded that there was no audio or video evidence, that it was aware of, that Imran Khan was related to the May 9 riots. Imran Khan also stated, that he was ready to apologize for the riots should a single piece of evidence be found implicating PTI in the violence that ensued on 9 May . In May 2024 Khan was acquitted from two May 9-related cases due to insufficient evidence. In June 2025, a Lahore anti-terrorism court rejected the police's request to conduct a polygraph (lie detector) and Photogrammetry (photo identification) test on Imran Khan. The presiding judge said Khan was already granted two chances to demonstrate cooperation, which he chose not to avail, saying "This is the first case in Pakistan where a suspect is actively refusing to prove their innocence".

In July 2024, a comprehensive order issued by Judge Khalid Arshad of the Anti Terrorism Court of Pakistan linked PTI's founder, Imran Khan, to the orchestration of attacks on military bases, government buildings, and police personnel. This order disclosed that Khan had directed PTI leaders to incite chaos and apply pressure for his release in the event of his arrest, according to testimonies from two prosecution witnesses. The court document detailed a meeting on 7 May 2023, where Khan allegedly instructed PTI leaders to brace for possible disturbances on May 9 if he were apprehended. In a video message, he reportedly cautioned that Pakistan could face turmoil similar to the 2022 Sri Lankan protests should he be detained, prompting his followers to participate in what he called a "real jihad for real freedom." The Chief Minister of Khyber Pakhtunkhwa, Ali Amin Gandapur, was also said to back Khan's position, suggesting that a hunger strike by Khan would trigger widespread protests both domestically and internationally. The prosecution argued that Khan masterminded a criminal conspiracy, mobilizing senior PTI figures to provoke actions that led to the Attack on the Corps Commander House, Lahore of the Jinnah House (Corp Commander House, Lahore), with the intention of intimidating the government. Judge Arshad's ruling highlighted that pre-arrest bail is not applicable for individuals plotting to undermine the government and committing acts of terrorism. As a result, Imran Khan's bail application was denied, upholding the court's stance on his supposed participation in the unrest.

On 25 August 2025, an anti-terrorism court in Faisalabad convicted 59 individuals, including senior PTI leaders Omar Ayub, Shibli Faraz, and Zartaj Gul, sentencing them to 10 years in prison in connection with the events of May 9. The court also sentenced 16 others to three years' imprisonment for attacking the residence of PMLN leader Rana Sanaullah and ordered the confiscation of properties belonging to 42 PTI supporters. A total of 34 accused, including former information minister Fawad Chaudhry and MNA Zain Qureshi, were acquitted due to insufficient evidence. The judgment described the events as part of a broader conspiracy allegedly planned at meetings in Rawalpindi and Lahore, though defense counsel questioned the credibility of key prosecution witnesses. Earlier, the defense counsels argued that only three witnesses were presented in relation to the alleged conspiracy said to have been planned at Rose Hotel in the Chakri area of Rawalpindi and at Imran Khan's Zaman Park residence, and they contended that the participation of these witnesses—Asmat Kamal, Hassam Afzal, and Muhamad Khalid, all police officers—in the two alleged meetings was highly doubtful based on their own disclosures. Non-bailable arrest warrants were issued for 75 absent convicts, and overall, more than 160 PTI members had their properties confiscated under Section 7(2) of the Anti-Terrorism Act, 1997.

==== Withdrawn cases reopened ====
Initially, during the tenure of CM Gandapur, the Khyber Pakhtunkhwa provincial government withdrew a number of cases. Officials at the time maintained that the cases had been lodged with malice and on political grounds, and that insufficient proof existed to sustain them. Subsequently, the cases were closed. Most withdrawals took place in Mardan. However, in October 2026, after declaration of emergency in KP and Governor's Rule, a fresh review of those decisions started. Former CM Sohail Afridi along with other senior PTI figures have been nominated in some of the cases.

=== Controversies ===
In August 2025, speculation emerged that Pakistan's Chief of Army Staff, Field Marshal Asim Munir, had sought a "sincere apology" over the riots, following a column by Suhail Warraich, a senior editor at the Daily Jang newspaper. Warraich claimed Munir had made the remarks during a conversation in Brussels, implying that political reconciliation could follow an apology—widely interpreted as being directed at the PTI, which the state holds responsible for the unrest. However, Inter-Services Public Relations (ISPR) Director General Lt Gen Ahmed Sharif Chaudhry later clarified that the army chief had neither made any political statement nor requested an apology, and had not given any interview during the Brussels visit.

=== Social media trolling ===
9 May incidents (Urdu: 9 مئی کے واقعات) generated trolling on social media which went haywire in country's political scene due to overemphasis on its condemnation by government and ISPR. Punjab Police decided to crackdown on accounts involved in trolling on various social media platforms.

== Observance ==
On the first anniversary of the May 9 riots, President Asif Ali Zardari called the occasion a "dark day" in Pakistan's history. This incident is very important in the modern political history of the country. Defense Minister Khawaja Asif said that the events of May 9 were part of a well thought-out conspiracy. They claimed that the attack on military installations and properties was carried out as part of a planned conspiracy by a political party. PTI observes these events as a "False Flag" operation aimed at crushing both the party and its leader, Imran Khan. PTI also condemned what it described as the unlawful detentions and brutal use of state power against its workers, who were peacefully protesting in observance of the alleged May 9 'false flag operation' across the country.

=== First anniversary ===
The first anniversary of the May 9 riots was marked with various events and ceremonies. A "Black Day" was observed on the anniversary of the incidents in schools and other educational institutions across Rawalpindi. The district administration of Rawalpindi announced the observance of "Black Day" with an official notification.

A delegation of Pakistan Federal Union of Journalists (PFUJ) and Punjab Union of Journalists visited Jinnah House in Lahore on the occasion of the first anniversary. He condemned the desecration of the memorials of Pakistan's martyrs and expressed outrage over Attack on the Corps Commander House, Lahore.

The PTI held public gatherings and processions on the first anniversary of the May 9 events, demanding the release of the party's founding chairman, Imran Khan, and other arrested leaders and workers.

A PTI spokesperson criticized the government for "using excessive force against PTI under the pretext of a false flag operation on May 9, 2023, to crush the party," and vowed that they would continue their "peaceful movement to uphold the supremacy of the Constitution and achieve Haqiqi Azadi". Imran Khan announced plans to take legal action to obtain CCTV footage of the May 9 riots, which he claims could expose the true perpetrators. The government released "exclusive" video footage of the riots and attacks on military installations in November 2024. In response to the call given by PTI, Prime Minister Shehbaz Sharif decided to pay homage to the country's martyrs on May 9. A ceremony was organized in Jinnah Convention Centre in honor of the martyrs.

Human rights advocates say that political repression has increased in Pakistan since the riots, maintaining that the situation has worsened since the attack on the military installations.

== See also ==
- 2025 Tehreek-e-Labbaik Pakistan protests
