= Attack on the Corps Commander House, Lahore =

Violent protests in Pakistan

Coordinates: 31.5291°N 74.3805°E

Corps Commander House attack
- Date: 9 May 2023
- Location: Lahore, Punjab, Pakistan
- Type: damage to premises
- Motive: under investigation but coincides with the arrest of Imran Khan
- Target: Corps Commander House, Lahore Corps
- Perpetrator: under investigation

On 9 May 2023, the Corps Commander House Lahore was attacked by Pakistan Tehreek-e-Insaf (PTI) protestors in response to the arrest of Imran Khan on the same day.

== Background ==
In 2018, the PTI won the general election and formed the government in Pakistan. In 2022, the PTI government was ousted from power in a no-confidence motion. Imran Khan first held US responsible for derailment of his government but later he blamed military establishment for conspiring against him. This led to widespread protests and social media campaign by PTI supporters against the Pakistan Army and ISI.

== Incident ==
The incident was condemned by the government and the military. The PTI party was accused of inciting violence but denied getting involved. Khan and party leaders have urged for an independent judicial commission to investigate. However, several thousand PTI leaders and members were arrested in connection with the incident raising human rights concerns.

== Aftermath ==
Following the violence, the government started cracking down on PTI supporters. Several PTI leaders were arrested. Human Rights watchdogs as well as parliaments in various countries have expressed over the arrests and trial by military courts.

Imran Khan's arrest and the following political uncertainty and human rights abuses had a negative impact on Pakistan's economy. The stock market crashed and the rupee lost value. Foreign investors also became wary of investing in Pakistan. Pakistan runs the risk of losing preferential treatment in trade as a result of government's crackdown on the opposition.

Many PTI leaders left the party under duress and condemned the 9 May violent attacks on Corps Commander House and demoralization of martyrs' memorials.

== Controversy ==
On 9 May 2023, Imran Khan was arrested, stirring nationwide violence. During the ensuing violence, the building and its contents were damaged. The official government and the ex-Prime Minister claims of the causes and culprits behind the violence are in disagreement with each other.

=== Government claims ===
According to a press release from Inter-Services Public Relations, the media wing of Pakistan Army, Khan's arrest was legal. Immediately after the arrest, an organized plan was carried out to attack property and installations of the army, while chanting slogans against the forces. The army observed extreme patience, prudence, and restraint.

=== Imran Khan's claims ===
In an interview with Fareed Zakaria, the former prime minister Imran Khan claimed that the incident of damages, arson and violence were a reaction and possibly a conspiracy. In various other video presentations, he also claimed that security apparatus was also involved in the incitement if not carrying out of the arson and violence.
