= Musarrat Hilali =

Pakistani judge

Justice of Supreme Court of Pakistan
- In office 7 July 2023 – 7 August 2026
- Appointed by: Arif Alvi; Asif Ali Zardari

Chief Justice of Peshawar High Court
- In office 1 April 2023 – 4 July 2023
- Preceded by: Qaiser Rashid Khan
- Succeeded by: Muhammad Ibrahim Khan

Justice of Peshawar High Court
- In office 26 March 2013 – 4 July 2023

Personal details
- Born: 8 August 1961 (age 65)

Musarrat Hilali (born 8 August 1961) is a retired Pakistani judge who served as only the second female judge to be elevated to the country's Supreme Court. She previously served as the first woman chief justice of the Peshawar High Court. From March 2013 till her elevation to the Supreme Court in July 2023, she had been the only woman on the bench of the Peshawar High Court.

== Education ==
Hilali received the law degree from the Khyber Law College, Peshawar University.

== Career ==
She started her career as an advocate of District Courts in 1983. In 1988, she was enrolled as an advocate of the High Court. She was elevated to the rank of advocate of Supreme Court in 2006. Hilali was elevated to the bench as additional judge in March 2013 and was given the permanent status of the judge of the Peshawar High Court in 2014. She took oath as the acting chief justice of the PHC on 1 April 2023 and then as the permanent chief justice on 12 May of the same year.

On 14 June 2023, after being recommended by Justice Qazi Faez Isa, the Judicial Commission of Pakistan unanimously approved Hilali's elevation to the Supreme Court. On 5 July 2023, she was appointed by President Arif Alvi as a justice of the Supreme Court of Pakistan, becoming the second women to be elevated to the post after Ayesha A. Malik.

=== Career achievements ===
- First female elected office bearer on the post of secretary at the Bar.
- First female elected vice president at the Bar.
- First female elected general secretary at the Bar.
- First female elected as executive member of the Supreme Court Bar Association.
- First female additional advocate general of Khyber Pakhtunkhwa.
- First female appointed as chairperson Khyber Pakhtunkhwa Environmental Protection Tribunal.
- First female ombudsman for protection against harassment of women at workplace.
- First woman judge from Khyber Pakhtunkhwa to be elected as an election tribunal for the 2018 Pakistani general elections .
