= Aminuddin Khan =

Pakistani judge (born 1960)

- امین الدین خان

Chief Justice of the Federal Constitutional Court of Pakistan
- Incumbent
- Assumed office 14 November 2025
- Appointed by: President Asif Ali Zardari
- Preceded by: Position established

Justice of the Supreme Court of Pakistan
- In office 22 October 2019 – 13 November 2025

Justice of Lahore High Court
- In office 12 May 2011 – 22 October 2019

Personal details
- Born: 1 December 1960 (age 65) Multan, Pakistan

Aminuddin Khan (Urdu: امین الدین خان; born 1 December 1960) is a Pakistani jurist who has been serving as the first chief justice of the Federal Constitutional Court of Pakistan since 14 November 2025. Previously, he served as a justice of the Supreme Court of Pakistan from 22 October 2019 to 14 November 2025 and Presiding Judge of the Constitutional Bench from October 2024 to November 2025. He also served as a justice of the Lahore High Court from 12 May 2011 to 22 October 2019. He was appointed as the first Chief Justice of the Federal Constitutional Court of Pakistan by the President of Pakistan on 13 November 2025.

== Early life and education ==
Khan was born in 1960 in Multan. He received his early education from Kinder Garten Muslim School and Government Muslim High School, Multan. He received a bachelor's degree in philosophy in 1981, an LLB from University Law College, Multan in 1984, and a diploma in tax law. In 1977, Khan represented Pakistan as a Boy Scout at the Asian Jamboree in Iran and received recognition from the President of Pakistan.

== Career ==
His legal career began under his father's tutelage, gaining a license to practice in lower courts in 1985. He became an advocate of the Lahore High Court in 1987 and an advocate of the Supreme Court of Pakistan in 2001. His practice mainly focused on civil law, particularly property, pre-emption, and inheritance cases.

His judicial career started with his appointment to the bench of the Lahore High Court in 2011. As a judge, Khan was involved in the adjudication of numerous civil cases, with many of his judgments upheld by the Supreme Court of Pakistan.

Khan also served as an examiner and lecturer in law at the University Law College, Multan, and was a member of the syndicate of various universities, including the University of Engineering and Technology, Lahore.

A Supreme Court bench consisting of six members, led by Justice Aminuddin Khan, presided over the intra-court appeals concerning the trials of civilians in military courts. The bench included Justices Muhammad Ali Mazhar, Hasan Azhar Rizvi, Shahid Waheed, Musarrat Hilali, and Irfan Saadat Khan.

On 5 November, 2024 the Judicial Commission of Pakistan (JCP) in a 7-5 decision ordered the formation of the Supreme Court's Constitutional Bench, with Justice Aminuddin Khan as presiding judge.
