= Government College of Commerce & Economics =

Coordinates: 24.847280°N 67.022912°E

Government College of Commerce & Economics دانش کدہَ سرکاری برائے علومِ تجارت و معاشیات
- Official emblem of Government College of Commerce & Economics.
- Type: Degree College
- Established: 1945
- Affiliations: Board of Intermediate Education Karachi and University of Karachi
- Principal: Professor Farzana Mangnejo
- Students: 4,000
- Location: Karachi, Sindh, Pakistan
- Website: http://www.gccek.com.pk

Government College of Commerce & Economics, (Urdu: دانش کدہَ سرکاری برائے علومِ تجارت و معاشیات) founded as the Basant Singh Asumal College of Commerce & Economics, is an institution of commerce education in the city of Karachi. It is located on Dr. Ziauddin Ahmed Road, opposite Bagh-e-Jinnah (Polo Ground) and Pearl Continental Hotel, Karachi.

== History ==
The college was established on 22 June 1945 under Basant Singh Asumal College of Commerce & Economics, and was inaugurated by Rao Bahadur Seth Shivrattan G. Mohatta. The college was taken under the supervision of the Government of Sindh in 1948 after the establishment of Pakistan. The current building of the college was constructed in 1967. It was a co-educational institution till 1993 but then separated into two sections for girls and boys.

== Courses ==
Government College of Commerce & Economics is offering following courses:

- Intermediate in Commerce (I. Com)
- Bachelor of Commerce (B.Com.)
- B.S Commerce 4 years (Affiliated with UoK)
- B.S Bachelors of Business Administration - BBA (Affiliated with UoK)

== List of Principals ==
Principal Name	From	To
Professor N.K. Bhojwani	June 1945	April 1948
Professor Iftikhar Ali	April 1948	19–06–1948
Professor A. L. Shaikh	20-06-1948	22–08–1955
Professor M. A. Qadir	23-08-1955	23–08–1956
Professor Razi-Ur-Rehman	24-08-1956	19–01–1967
Professor N. A. Farooqui	20-01-1967	10–07–1974
Professor S. I. A. Subzwari	10-07-1974	24–10–1974
Professor N. A. Farooqui	24-10-1974	16–11–1984
Professor S. I. A. Subzwari	17-11-1984	07–08–1990
Professor Shaukat Ali	08-08-1990	16–01–1994
Professor Nasim Siddiqui	17-01-1994	22–04–1994
Professor Sahib Khan Channa	23-04-1994	27–06–1995
Professor Hasan Akbar	28-06-1995	30–06–1996
Professor Abdul Haseeb Ahsan Shaikh	01-07-1996	25–01–1997
Professor Muhammad Aslam Khan	26-01-1997	11–11–2005
Professor Rukhsana Saleem	11-11-2005	06–01–2006
Professor Jalal Ud Din Chohan	06-01-2006	08–05–2008
Professor Dr. A.K. Ashraf Samo	08-05-2008	04–07–2008
Professor Dr. Razia Khokhar	04-07-2008	07–07–2017
Professor Syed Sarwar Ali Shah	08-07-2017	2023
Professor Farzana Mangnejo	2023	To date

== See also ==
- Board of Intermediate Education Karachi
- University of Karachi
