= Shahid Bilal Hassan =

Justice of the Lahore High Court

- شاہد بلال حسن

Justice of the Supreme Court of Pakistan
- Incumbent
- Assumed office 25 June 2024

Justice of the Lahore High Court
- In office 12 April 2013 – 25 June 2024

Personal details
- Born: 12 March 1965 (age 61)

Shahid Bilal Hassan (Urdu: شاہد بلال حسن, born 12 March 1965) is a Pakistani jurist who served as a Justice at the Lahore High Court from 12 April 2013 to 25 June 2024. He was elevated to the Supreme Court of Pakistan on 25 June 2024.

On 7 June 2024 Justice Hassan was recommended for elevation to the Supreme Court of Pakistan, his name was sent to the Parliamentary Committee on judges appointment for approval.
