= Naeem Akhtar Afghan =

Pakistani judge (born 1963)

Justice of Supreme Court of Pakistan
- Incumbent
- Assumed office 11 March 2024
- Appointed by: Arif Alvi
- Preceded by: Jamal Khan Mandokhail

Chief Justice of Balochistan High Court
- In office 9 August 2021 – 11 March 2024
- Succeeded by: Muhammad Hashim Kakar

Justice of Balochistan High Court
- In office 12 May 2011 – 11 March 2024

Personal details
- Born: 29 June 1963 (age 63)
- Education: Bachelors of Law
- Alma mater: University Law College, Quetta (LLB)

Naeem Akhtar Afghan (born 29 June 1963) is a Pakistani jurist who served as the Justice of the Balochistan High Court from 12 May 2011, until his elevation to the Supreme Court of Pakistan in 2024. He also served as Chief Justice of the Balochistan High Court from August 2021 until his elevation to the Supreme Court in 2024.
