= Jamal Khan Mandokhail =

Pakistani judge (born 1961)

- جمال خان مندوخیل

Justice of the Supreme Court of Pakistan
- In office 9 August 2021 – 11 November 2026

Chief Justice of Balochistan High Court
- In office 5 October 2019 – 9 August 2021
- Preceded by: Tahira Safdar
- Succeeded by: Naeem Akhtar Afghan

Justice of Balochistan High Court
- In office 7 September 2009 – 9 August 2021

Personal details
- Born: 12 November 1961 (age 64) Quetta, Pakistan
- Citizenship: Pakistani
- Education: University of Balochistan (MA); University Law College, Quetta (LL.B)

Jamal Khan Mandokhail (Urdu: جمال خان مندوخیل; born 12 November 1961) is a Pakistani jurist who served as a judge of the Supreme Court of Pakistan from 9 August 2021 till 11 November 2026. He has previously been the Chief Justice of Balochistan High Court from 5 October 2019 to 9 August 2021. He has also served as a judge of the Supreme Court of Pakistan constitution bench November 2024 till November 2025. He was also a member of constitution judges committee. He was also administrative judge of Supreme court of Pakistan.

== Early life and education ==
Mandokhail was born on November 12, 1961, in Quetta. He is a son of Feroz Khan, a businessman, and grandson of Shaikh Ahmed Khan, a former Deputy Commissioner of Balochistan.

Mandokhail completed his matriculation from the Federal Government High School in Quetta Cantonment and an F.Sc. from the Government Science College, Quetta. He holds a bachelor's degree in commerce and master's degrees in political science and economics from the University of Balochistan. He completed his LL.B from the University Law College, Quetta in 1987.

== Career ==
His legal career commenced with his enrollment as an advocate in 1988, followed by admissions to the Balochistan High Court and the Supreme Court bars in 1990 and 2001, respectively. He also served as a lecturer in law and held a position in the National Accountability Bureau.

Mandokhail has been an active participant in legal and bar associations. He was elected to various positions, including the General Secretary of the Balochistan High Court Bar Association and roles within the Supreme Court Bar Association. In 2009, he was appointed as the Senior Puisne Judge of the Balochistan High Court, later serving as Acting Chief Justice.
