= Ayesha Malik =

Pakistani judge (born 1966)

Ayesha A. Malik
- عائشہ اے ملک

Justice of the Supreme Court of Pakistan
- Incumbent
- Assumed office 24 January 2022
- Appointed by: Arif Alvi

Justice of the Lahore High Court
- In office 27 March 2012 – 5 January 2022

Personal details
- Born: 3 June 1966 (age 60) Karachi, Sind
- Spouse: Humayun Ehsan
- Education: Government College of Commerce & Economics (B. Com); Pakistan College of Law, Lahore (LLB); Harvard University (LLM)

Ayesha A. Malik (Urdu: عائشہ اے ملک; born 3 June 1966) is a Pakistani judge. She is the first female judge of the Supreme Court of Pakistan. On 6 January 2022, the Judicial Commission of Pakistan approved her appointment to the Supreme Court of Pakistan. She took her oath of office on 24 January 2022. Malik has also served as a Judge of the Lahore High Court from 27 March 2012 to 5 January 2022.

== Early life and education ==
Malik received her education from schools in Paris and New York and completed her A-Levels at Francis Holland School for Girls in London. In Pakistan, she attended the Karachi Grammar School and earned her Bachelor of Commerce degree from the Government College of Commerce & Economics, Karachi. She received her law degree from Pakistan College of Law, Lahore and her LL.M. from Harvard Law School, where she was named a London H. Gammon Fellow 1998-1999 for outstanding merit.

== Legal career ==
Malik started her legal career by assisting Mr. Justice (Retd.) Fakhurddin G. Ebrahim at Fakhruddin G. Ebrahim & Co., Karachi from 1997 to 2001. From 2001 to 2004, Malik worked with Rizvi, Isa, Afridi & Angell (RIAA) initially as a Senior Associate. From 2004 to 2012, she was a Partner at RIAA, spearheading the firm's Corporate & Litigation Department.

Malik's legal practice consists of appearances in the High Courts, District Courts, Banking Courts, Special Tribunals and Arbitration Tribunals. In England and Australia, she was an expert witness in family law cases involving issues of child custody, divorce, women's rights and constitutional protection for women in Pakistan.

=== Judge of the Lahore High Court ===
On 27 March 2012, Malik became a Judge of the Lahore High Court.

Malik heard the environmental matters in Lahore High Court and was a green judge with advocacy of environmental justice.

She has worked on the process for effectively expediting the litigation process by automation and case management.

Malik has been a member of the Federal Revenue Board and has remained an Inspection Judge of various Districts in Punjab. She has been a Board Member of the Punjab Judicial Academy and has contributed to academic developments therein. Malik has been a Member of the Federal Review Board and the Chairperson of the Judicial Officers Female Supervisory Committee.

She initiated the first Punjab Women Judges Conference in 2016 at the Lahore High Court. Conferences have since been held in 2017 and 2019 and have brought to the forefront gender perspectives and potential solutions to the need to improve the litigation process for female litigants.

Malik has chaired the Judicial Officers Female Supervisory Committee at the Lahore High Court which looked at all issues related to female judicial officers.

Malik has significantly advanced jurisprudence across diverse domains both during her tenure at the High Court. With a strong rights-based approach, she displays unwavering dedication to advancing the rule of law, championing environmental and climate justice, safeguarding commercial and economic rights, and protecting the rights of women.

=== Judge of the Supreme Court of Pakistan ===
In January 2022, she took oath as Justice of the Supreme Court of Pakistan. She became the first female judge of the Supreme Court.

Malik was a member of the National Judicial Automation Committee. She has been part of the Court's Committee on Case Management.

Since July 2024, she has been a member of the Alternate Dispute Resolution Committee, which aims to establish a legal, structural, and organizational framework for Alternate Dispute Resolution in Pakistan.

Malik was appointed as a Liaison Judge on UK-Pakistan Protocol on Child and Family Laws on January 8, 2024. The UK-Pakistan Judicial Protocol on Children Matters remains a significant framework for resolving cross-border child custody and abduction cases between the UK and Pakistan, particularly in light of developments related to the Hague Convention on the Civil Aspects of International Child Abduction.

At the Supreme Court of Pakistan, Malik champions environmental and climate justice, commercial and economic rights, and women and children's rights. Her judgments emphasize effective enforcement, robust justice mechanisms, and equal access to justice through collaboration among state branches.

=== Landmark Judicial Rulings ===
Malik has made significant contributions to constitutional jurisprudence through numerous landmark judgments. In Jawwad S. Khawaja v. Federation of Pakistan (PLD 2024 SC 337), she declared military trials of civilians unconstitutional, emphasizing the right to fair trial within civilian courts as guaranteed by Article 10A. In Raja Amer Khan v. Federation of Pakistan (PLJ 2024 SC 114), her dissenting opinion declared the Supreme Court (Practice and Procedure) Act, 2023 ultra vires the Constitution of Pakistan, 1973. In Federal Government of Pakistan v. Zakia Begum (PLD 2023 SC 277), she emphasized fair compensation based on market value rather than outdated classifications for landowners. In JDW Sugar Mills Ltd v. Province of Punjab (PLD 2017 Lah. 68), she protected agricultural sustainability by ruling against unauthorized sugar mill relocations that would harm farmers' rights. In Syed Khurram Abbas Bukhari v. Election Commission of Pakistan (PLJ 2017 Lahore 523), she ruled that the Election Commission lacks jurisdiction to interfere post-notification of election results. In Province of Sindh v. Sartaj Hyder (2023 SCMR 459), she advocated for women's participation in flood relief committees. In Public Interest Law Association of Pakistan v. Province of Sindh (2023 SCMR 969), she called for climate-proof mining policies and proper environmental assessments.

Malik's gender justice jurisprudence demonstrates her unwavering dedication to women's rights and dignity. Her landmark judgment in Sadaf Aziz v. Federation of Pakistan (PCr.LJ 2021 Lahore 205) declared virginity tests unconstitutional, recognizing them as invasive and discriminatory practices violating women's dignity with no scientific basis. In Nadia Naz v. President of Pakistan (PLD 2023 SC 588), she expanded the definition of sexual harassment beyond sexual desire to include gender-based discrimination arising from power dynamics, drawing on international conventions. Her dissenting opinion in Muhammad Imran v. the State (2024 SCP 226) rejected the notion that physical resistance is necessary to prove rape, refuting stereotypes about victim behavior and advocating for a victim-centered approach. She further protected women's rights in Pervaiz Akhtar v. Farida Bibi (PLD 2023 SC 628) by establishing stringent standards for property transactions involving Pardanashin women with limited social and legal agency, and in Government of Punjab v. Qanoot Fatima (PLJ 2018 Lahore 341), she addressed workplace discrimination by ruling that qualified women cannot be relegated to reserved seats.

In commercial and arbitration matters, Malik has consistently upheld legal frameworks that promote economic stability and investor confidence. Her judgment in Orient Power Company v. Sui Northern Gas Pipelines Limited (2019 CLD 1082) affirmed the Lahore High Court's exclusive jurisdiction to enforce foreign arbitral awards under the Recognition and Enforcement Act, aligning with the New York Convention and emphasizing swift arbitration procedures. She clarified that arbitral awards cannot be refused on vague public policy grounds, thereby safeguarding the integrity of arbitration as a dispute resolution mechanism. In LPG Association of Pakistan v. Federation of Pakistan (2020 LHC 2274), she upheld Parliament's competency to legislate the Competition Act, asserting that regulating competition is a federal responsibility crucial for free trade and economic stability.

== Legal educator ==
Malik has taught Banking Law at the University of Punjab, Department of Masters of Business and Information Technology and Mercantile Law at College of Accounting & Management Sciences, Karachi.

She developed a course on 'gender sensitization for court processes' for Board of the Punjab Judicial Academy. She also compiled a handbook on environmental laws for facilitating the courts on dealing with environmental matters.

== International conferences, associations and social work ==
In addition to delivering notable judgments in constitutional matters, Malik regularly engages with national and international forums where she effectively highlights challenges Pakistan faces, so as to bring Global South's perspective into the conversation, contributing to the broader discourse on these critical issues. Notably, she was the only speaker from this region at a high-level conference on "the Right to a Clean, Healthy, and Sustainable Environment in Practice," held in 2023 under the auspices of the Icelandic Presidency of the Committee of Ministers of the Council of Europe.

Malik attended COP29 in Baku, Azerbaijan where she emphasized the critical role of climate science in judicial processes, highlighting its importance in establishing causation, guiding accountability, and fostering effective enforcement in climate change-related litigation.

She attended the 2022 conference titled "Bangkok General Guidance for Judges on Applying a Gender Perspective in South and Southeast Asia," sharing insights on integrating gender-sensitive approaches in judicial systems.

She also attended the 5th Congress of the Association of Asian Constitutional Courts and Equivalent Institutions in Mongolia, focusing on constitutional issues across Asia. These engagements reflect her commitment to advancing judicial reforms regionally and internationally.

Malik is a part of The International Association of Women Judges (IAWJ). She is an advocate of the importance of the gender perspective in upholding the rule of law.

Malik has worked as counsel, pro bono for NGOs involved in poverty alleviation programs, micro finance programs and skills training programs.

She also voluntarily taught English Language and Development in Communication Skills at SOS Herman Gmeiner School in Lahore (an SOS project) for many years.

== Honours and publications ==
Malik was included in the prestigious BBC 100 Women 2022 list, which celebrates 100 inspiring and influential women from around the globe.

Her achievements have also been honoured by Forbes, which recognized her as one of the Women Who Made Global History in 2022. Additionally, Malik was featured in Forbes’ 50 Over 50: Asia 2023 list, which showcased 50 remarkable women over the age of 50 from the Asia-Pacific region who are making significant strides in their respective fields and serving as beacons of inspiration for the next generation.

Furthermore, Equality Now, in celebration of its 30th Anniversary, honoured Malik in its 30 For 30 women and changemakers who have helped shape a more equitable world.

Malik's exceptional achievements have also been recognized by the Honourable Society of the Middle Temple in 2022, who bestowed upon her the prestigious title of Honorary Bencher.

Malik was awarded Doctor of Laws, Honoris Causa from the University of London on April 28, 2025. Patricia McKellar, Dean of University of London, said in her speech:

"Malik's judicial career has included notable ruling on constitutional law, such as declaring the virginity testing (two-finger test in rape cases unconstitutional, expanding the legal definitions of workplace harassment, and ruling against the trial of civilians in military courts. She has also publicly advocated for gender equality in the judiciary, environmental protection, and the legal education of future professionals."

Malik has published various academic paper which are as follows:

1. Why 'Trade' in Financial Services: An assessment of the Agreement on Trade in Financial Services under the GATS- The Journal of World Investment, Vol 1 No.2, December 2000. 12th Edition of the Global Report 2004 on the Independence of the Judiciary-Pakistan Chapter. Pakistan Secular Laws:
2. The Oxford International Encyclopedia of Legal History published by Oxford University Press 2009, Volume 4
3. Compilation of the Supreme Court of Pakistan 1956-2006 Selected Cases published by the Pakistan College of Law, published at the 50th anniversary of the Supreme Court of Pakistan.
4. Contribution to the Merger Control, Getting The Deal Through, being an International Journal of Competition policy and Regulation Global Competition Review.
5. Reporting for Pakistan for the Oxford Reports on International Law in Domestic Courts, a publication of the Oxford University Press.
6. Judicial Review and the Rule of Law in Pakistan (Asian Journal of Comparative Law, Vol. 18 No. 3, December 2023).
7. Unearthing Environmental Justice: Judicial Review and Pakistan's Climate Crisis (Chapter 7) in Environmental Courts and Tribunals in Asia-Pacific. Leiden, The Netherlands: Brill | Nijhoff. https://doi.org/10.1163/9789004695863_008.

== Personal life ==
She is married to Humayun Ihsan, who is a corporate lawyer and educationist. She also is the mother to three children, one of them currently an undergraduate at Georgetown University.
