= Hasan Azhar Rizvi =

Pakistani judge

Syed Hasan Azhar Rizvi سید حسن اظہر رضوی

Justice of the Supreme Court of Pakistan
- In office 11 November 2022 – 13 November 2025
- Nominated by: Judicial Commission of Pakistan
- Appointed by: President of Pakistan

Justice of the Sindh High Court
- In office 18 Feb 2010 – 10 November 2022

Personal details
- Born: 2 February 1962 (age 64) Karachi, Sindh, Pakistan

Syed Hasan Azhar Rizvi (Urdu: سید حسن اظہر رضوی; born 2 February 1962) is a Pakistani jurist who has been serving in the Supreme Court of Pakistan as a judge since 11 November 2022 and also has been Justice of the Sindh High Court (SHC) from 18 February 2010 to 10 November 2022. He was ranked on 4th in seniority list of Sindh High Court. He is judge of federal constitutional court of Pakistan since 14 November 2025.

== Elevation to Supreme Court of Pakistan ==
The elevation of Hasan Azhar Rizvi from the Sindh High Court (SLHC), to the Supreme Court was approved by the Judicial Commission of Pakistan (JCP) on 24 October 2022.
