= Muhammad Ali Mazhar =

Pakistani judge (born 1964)

- محمد علی مظہر

Justice of the Supreme Court of Pakistan
- Incumbent
- Assumed office 16 August 2021

Justice of the Sindh High Court
- In office 18 February 2010 – 16 August 2021

Personal details
- Born: 5 October 1964 (age 62) Karachi, Pakistan

Muhammad Ali Mazhar (Urdu: محمد علی مظہر; born 5 October 1964) is a Pakistani jurist, serving as a judge of the Supreme Court of Pakistan since 16 August 2021. Previously, he served as a judge of the Sindh High Court from 18 February 2010 to 16 August 2021.
