= Judicial Commission of Pakistan =

Appointment commission for the superior judiciary in Pakistan

The Judicial Commission of Pakistan ( کمیشن قضایی پاکستان) is a national commission for appointment of the superior judiciary, consisting of the Supreme Court, the Federal Shariat Court and the High Courts, of Pakistan. The Chief Justice of Pakistan is the chairman of the commission.

On 20 April 2010, the 18th Constitutional Amendment was passed in the Parliament of Pakistan, which was later amended by the 19th Constitutional Amendment. In pursuance of the amendments, a judicial commission was proposed to be created to recommend the appointment of Judges of the superior courts in Pakistan.

Through the 18th Amendment in 2010, Pakistan got two forums for appointment of judges to the superior judiciary: a Judicial Commission with representation from the judiciary, lawyers and the federal government, responsible for recommending names of respective judges; and a parliamentary committee to approve or reject these names but with assigning reasons if some name is rejected.

The 18th amendment also provided (Para 3 of Article 175A) that the president shall appoint the senior most judge of the Supreme Court to the office of the Chief Justice thus formally recognizing the principle of seniority and legitimate expectancy enunciated by the apex court in the Al-Jihad case and subsequently reiterated in some other cases.

In October 2024, 26th amendment to the constitution was passed and membership of Judicial Commission was changed. According to 26th amendment to the constitution, Judicial Commission consists of 13 members, Chief Justice of Pakistan as chairman of Judicial Commission, 3 senior most justices of the Supreme Court, senior most justice of constitutional bench, Federal Minister for Law, Attorney General for Pakistan, 2 members from National Assembly and 2 members of Senate, out of whom two shall be nominated by Leader of the House and 2 by Leader of the Opposition, advocate to be nominated by Pakistan Bar Council for two years and a woman or non-Muslim member nominated by Speaker of National Assembly.

Judicial Commission will select judges by a simple majority of the total membership and names of selected judges will be recommended to the Prime Minister for appointment, The Prime Minister will send names of selected judges to President and President will appoint those judges to the Supreme Court and High Courts.

== See also ==
- Eighteenth Amendment to the Constitution of Pakistan
- Nineteenth Amendment to the Constitution of Pakistan
- High courts of Pakistan
- Supreme Judicial Council of Pakistan
