= Munib Akhtar =

Pakistani judge (born 1963)

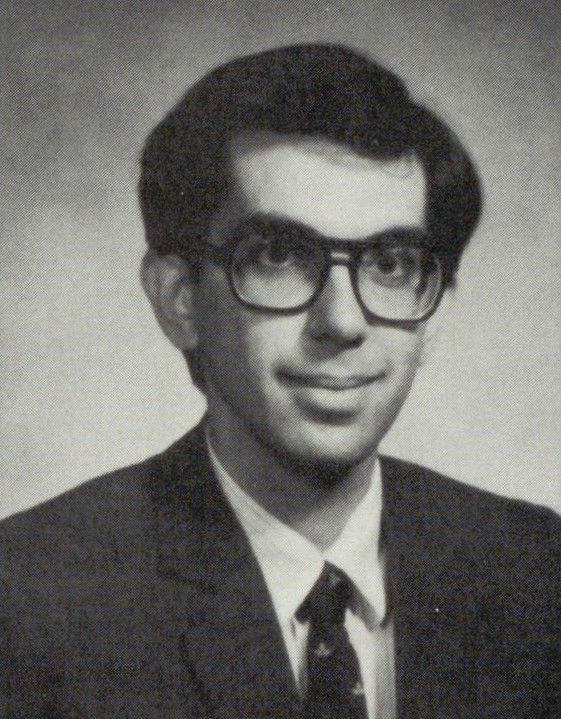
- Akhtar in the Princeton University yearbook, 1986

Acting Chief Justice of Pakistan
- In office 19 May 2024 – 25 May 2024

Justice of the Supreme Court of Pakistan
- Incumbent
- Assumed office 8 May 2018

Justice of the Sindh High Court
- In office 2009–2018

Personal details
- Born: 14 December 1963 (age 62)
- Relations: Khalid Anwer (father-in-law)
- Education: Princeton University (AB)
- Alma mater: Aitchison College

Munib Akhtar (Urdu: منیب اختر; born 14 December 1963) is a Pakistani jurist who has been serving as a justice of the Supreme Court of Pakistan since 8 May 2018. He briefly served as acting Chief Justice of Pakistan from 19 to 25 May 2024.

== Early life and education ==
Akhtar was born in 1963. He is a son-in-law of former Pakistani law minister Khalid Anwer and the grandson of former Prime Minister of Pakistan Chaudhry Mohammad Ali (1955–1956). He completed his early education from Aitchison College.

Akhtar graduated with a B.A. from Government College University, Lahore in 1983 and from Princeton University in 1986 after completing a 150-page long senior thesis titled "Pakistan and South Korea 1947 -- 1970: A Comparative Analysis of Economic Development." He earned his LLB from Punjab University Law College in 1989.

== Career ==
His legal career began with his enrollment as an advocate in subordinate courts in 1990. He was admitted to the Sindh High Court in 1992 and the Supreme Court of Pakistan in 2009. Akhtar's practice focused on the Supreme Court and High Courts, specializing in civil law with an emphasis on commercial, corporate, arbitration, and taxation matters. Additionally, he taught law at Hamdard University Law School for a year, specifically a course on Human Rights.

Akhtar was appointed as an Additional Judge of the Sindh High Court in 2009 and was confirmed in this role in 2011. His judicial experience includes serving on both original and appellate side benches, dealing with civil, corporate, criminal, tax, and labor/service law, mainly at the Principal Seat and at Sukkur and Hyderabad.

In administrative capacities, Akhtar has been a chairman or member of several committees, such as the Civil Rules Committee, I.T. Committee, Judicial Studies Board, Promotion Committee, and Procurement Committee. He has also functioned as a Monitoring Judge in various contexts.

Since 2009, Akhtar has held a nominated position as chairman or member of the board of governors at the Institute of Business Administration (IBA). In 2018, he elevated as a Justice of the Supreme Court of Pakistan.

In May 2024 and May 2025, he assumed the role of acting Chief Justice of Pakistan for a few days while the Chief Justice of Pakistan, was traveling abroad.
