= Bar Councils in Pakistan =

The seven Bar Councils in Pakistan came into being as a result of enactment of the Legal Practitioners and Bar Councils Act 1973. These Bar Councils are elected bodies that regulate legal professionals across provincial, territorial and national level. All bar associations in the country are affiliated to and work under the control of one of these bar councils.

- Pakistan Bar Council
- Punjab Bar Council
- Sindh Bar Council
- Khyber Pakhtunkhwa Bar Council
- Balochistan Bar Council
- Islamabad Bar Council
- Azad Jammu & Kashmir Bar Council
- Gilgit Baltistan Bar Council

== See also ==
- Supreme Court of Pakistan
- Attorney General of Pakistan
- Federal Shariat Court
- List of justices of the Supreme Court of Pakistan
- Ministry of Law & Justice of Pakistan
- Minister of Law & Justice Pakistan
- The Pakistan Bar Council and the five province-level bar councils:
  - Balochistan Bar Council
  - Islamabad Bar Council
  - Khyber Pakhtunkhwa Bar Council
  - Punjab Bar Council
  - Sindh Bar Council
- Supreme Court Bar Association of Pakistan and the provincial High Court Bar Associations:
  - Lahore High Court Bar Association
- The five High Courts of Pakistan:
  - Balochistan High Court
  - Islamabad High Court
  - Lahore High Court
  - Peshawar High Court
  - Sindh High Court
  - Gilgit-Baltistan Supreme Appellate Court
- List of cases of the Supreme Court of Pakistan
- Law of Pakistan
