= Bar council =

Professional body of barristers

A bar council (Irish: Comhairle an Bharra) or bar association, in a common law jurisdiction with a legal profession split between solicitors and barristers or advocates, is a professional body that regulates the profession of barristers. In such jurisdictions, solicitors are generally regulated by the law society.

In common law jurisdictions with no distinction between barristers and solicitors (i.e. where there is a "fused profession"), the professional body may be called variously a Law Society, Bar Council or a bar association.

== List of some bar councils and bar associations ==
The following are bar councils and bar associations that are professional bodies for barristers in common law jurisdictions with a split legal profession.

- General Council of the Bar, the professional body for England and Wales commonly known as the Bar Council
  - Bar Council of Northern Ireland, in Northern Ireland
- Australian Bar Association, in Australia
  - Australian Capital Territory Bar Association, in the Australian Capital Territory
  - New South Wales Bar Association, in New South Wales
  - Victorian Bar Council, in Victoria
  - Queensland Bar Association, in Queensland
  - South Australian Bar Association, in South Australia
  - Western Australian Bar Association, in Western Australia
  - Tasmanian Bar Council, in Tasmania
- Bangladesh Bar Council and Bangladesh Supreme Court Bar Association
- Bar Council of Ireland (together with the King's Inns), in the Republic of Ireland
- Bar Council of India and Supreme Court Bar Association (India)
- Pakistan Bar Council, the statutory body that regulates the legal profession in Pakistan
  - Sindh Bar Council, in Sindh
  - Punjab Bar Council, in Punjab
  - Balochistan Bar Council, in Balochistan
  - Khyber Pakhtunkhwa Bar Council, in Khyber Pakhtunkhwa
  - Azad Jammu & Kashmir Bar Council, in Azad Jammu & Kashmir
  - Islamabad Bar Council, in Islamabad
- There are also Lawyers Bar Associations in Pakistan representing different levels from Federal, Provincial and District wise. Few of the them are:
  - Supreme Court Bar Association of Pakistan
  - Lahore High Court Bar Association
  - Lahore Bar Association
- The Legal Practice Council, the regulatory body in South Africa that regulates the activities of all lawyers in South Africa
- The General Council of the Bar of South Africa, the body to which most regional bar associations in South Africa belong
- The Johannesburg Society of Advocates, the largest bar association in Johannesburg, South Africa
- Hong Kong Bar Association, in Hong Kong
