= Azad Jammu and Kashmir Bar Council =

Azad Jammu & Kashmir Bar Council
- Type: Public Body
- Purpose: Bar associations
- Headquarters: Muzaffarabad, Azad Kashmir, Pakistan
- Region served: Azad Kashmir, Pakistan
- Official language: English
- Website: www.ajkbarcouncil.com

The Azad Jammu & Kashmir Bar Council, also known as AJK Bar Council, is a statutory, elected and deliberative assembly of lawyers in Azad Kashmir for safeguarding the rights, interests and privileges of practicing lawyers, within Azad Kashmir. Haroon Riaz Mughal Advocate is the current vice-chairman of the Council.

== See also ==
- List of Pakistani Lawyers
- Pakistan Bar Council
- Punjab Bar Council
- Sindh Bar Council
- Khyber Pakhtunkhwa Bar Council
