= Lateef Afridi =

Pakistani lawyer and politician (1943–2023)

Abdul Lateef Afridi
- عبدالطیف افریدی
- Born: 14 November 1943; Khyber, North-West Frontier Province, British India (present-day Khyber Pakhtunkhwa, Pakistan)
- Died: 16 January 2023 (aged 79); Peshawar, Khyber Pakhtunkhwa, Pakistan
- Cause of death: Assassination
- Occupations: Lawyer; politician; activist
- Office: President of the Supreme Court Bar Association of Pakistan (2020–2021); President of the Peshawar High Court Bar Association (2012); Vice-Chairman of the Pakistan Bar Council (2011); Member of the National Assembly of Pakistan (1997–1999)
- Political party: National Democratic Movement
- Other political affiliations: Pakistan National Party (until 1986); Awami National Party (1986–2021)

Abdul Lateef Afridi (Pashto, Urdu: عبدالطیف افریدی; 14 November 1943 – 16 January 2023), also known as Lateef Lala (لطیف لالا), was a Pakistani lawyer and politician who served in the National Assembly from 1997 until 1999 as a member of the Awami National Party. In September 2021, Afridi was one of the founders of the National Democratic Movement.

Afridi had a prominent legal career, culminating in his election as president of the Supreme Court Bar Association of Pakistan in 2020. Prior to this, Afridi was the president of the Peshawar High Court Bar Association and was a leader in the Lawyers' Movement. On 16 January 2023, Afridi was murdered by a gunman dressed in judicial robes, who fired six shots at Afridi's chest at close range at the Peshawar High Court.

== Biography ==
=== Early life ===
Abdul Lateef Afridi was born in 1943 in Tirah, Khyber Agency. He obtained a master's degree from Peshawar University in 1966. Two years later, he received a law degree from the same institution. Afridi was expelled from the university for supporting Fatima Jinnah in the 1964 presidential election.

=== Political and legal career ===
In 1979, Afridi joined the Pakistan National Party and became its provincial president in Khyber Pakhtunkhwa. In 1986, when the PNP merged into the Awami National Party, Afridi remained as the provincial president and eventually rose to become the party's vice president. In 1997, Afridi was elected to the National Assembly of Pakistan from the NA-46 constituency, serving until 1999.

Afridi was elected five times as president of the Peshawar High Court Bar Association, and he was elected president of the Supreme Court Bar Association of Pakistan on 30 October 2020. Afridi was a prominent leader in the Lawyers' Movement protests in the late-2000s.

On 2 September 2019, Afridi's ANP membership was terminated by Aimal Wali Khan, the party's Khyber provincial president. On 1 September 2021, Afridi became a founding member of the National Democratic Movement (NDM).

== Death ==
On 16 January 2023, Afridi was lounging with other lawyers in the bar room at the Peshawar High Court when a gunman dressed in full judicial robes opened fire at him, striking him in the chest six times from close range. Afridi was taken to the nearby Lady Reading Hospital but was pronounced dead on arrival. He was 79. The attacker, Adnan Khan, was arrested at the scene and reportedly accused Afridi of orchestrating the killing of his father.

=== Reactions ===
Former President Asif Ali Zardari also expressed condemnation for the death, stating that Afridi was a supporter of democracy and a staunch opponent of extremism. Prime Minister Shehbaz Sharif called for immediate measures to be taken to address the law and order situation in Khyber Pakhtunkhwa. Other government officials, including government ministers and National Assembly Speaker Raja Pervaiz Ashraf, also condemned the murder.

The Supreme Court Bar Association and the Pakistan Bar Council announced that lawyers across Pakistan would go on strike and not appear in court on 17 January. According to PBC's press release, members of the council expressed "serious concerns upon the failure of the Khyber Pakhtunkhwa government, the Khyber Pakhtunkhwa police and law enforcement agencies regarding the provision of security to courts and lawyers". The Khyber Pakhtunkhwa Bar Council, the Peshawar Bar Association, the Sindh Bar Council, the Lahore Bar Association, and the Lahore High Court Bar Association also expressed condemnation and announced strikes in protest.
