= Islamabad Bar Council =

Assembly of lawyers in Pakistan

- اسلام آباد بار کونسل
- Type: Regulating authority for lawyers, Public Body with elected office bearers
- Headquarters: Islamabad, Pakistan
- Region served: Islamabad Capital Territory
- Official language: English،Urdu
- Vice Chairman: Asif Irfan
- Member Appellate Tribunal: 1. Abdul Rahman Hur Bajwa 2. Hafeez Ullah Yaqoob
- Website: www.ibc.org.pk

The Islamabad Bar Council is a statutory and deliberative assembly of lawyers in Islamabad Capital Territory for safeguarding the rights, interests and privileges of practicing lawyers, within Islamabad Capital Territory of Pakistan. The Council also regulates the conduct of lawyers and helps in the administration of justice. It was constituted in 2014 after addition of Section 3(1)(iii) to the Legal Practitioners and Bar Councils Act, 1973 and became functional on 23 May 2015 after its first election. All advocates practicing in any court or tribunal in Islamabad, except the Supreme Court are licensed and regulated by the Council. Advocates licensed and regulated by other provincial bar councils can also practice in Islamabad.

== Composition ==
The Islamabad Bar Council consists of Vice Chairman and Chairman Executive Committee, both elected by members of Islamabad Bar Council each year. Members of Islamabad Bar Council are elected by the advocates from different constituencies across the Islamabad Capital Territory. Members serve a term of five years, beginning on January 1, with elections held each November to fill seats of those whose terms will expire in the following January. The Council became functional after its first election was held on 2 May 2015 after its formation in 2014. The Advocate General of the Islamabad Capital Territory, acts as ex officio Chairman of the Islamabad Bar Council. However, the Advocate General does not possess the same powers as the other elected members of the Council.

=== Electoral Officers ===
- Vice Chairman: Vice Chairman is figurehead of Bar Council and is elected by the members of the Council in January each year. Vice Chairman is ex officio Member of each Committee of Bar Council. Traditionally, the office of vice chairman is considered to be the foremost elected position in the council, but the executive powers of Bar Council are rest with Chairman Executive Committee. The current Vice Chairman of Islamabad Bar Council is Asif Irfan
- Chairman Executive: The Chairman of the Executive Committee is generally the most powerful office of Bar Council and is elected by the members of the Council in each year. Chairman Executive Committee has full authority to decide matters of Bar Council in every aspect.
- Members of Islamabad Bar Council are elected after 4 years for a duration of 5 years by the lawyers enrolled as an advocate in Islamabad Bar Council. Abdul Rahman Hur Bajwa is the member with highest number of votes in the incumbent Council elected in 2025.

=== Permanent Officer ===
- Secretary: A full-time employee of Grade 21 or 22, responsible to perform duties listed under the Legal Practitioners and Bar Councils Act, 1973. The powers of the Secretary are subject to the provisions of the Legal Practitioners and Bar Council Act and the Rules the secretary acts, under the supervisory control of the Executive Committee. Mirza M. Amin Tahir is the current secretary of Islamabad Bar Council.

== See also ==
- Islamabad District Court
- List of Pakistani Lawyers
- Pakistan Bar Council
- Punjab Bar Council
- Sindh Bar Council
- Khyber Pakhtunkhwa Bar Council
- Balochistan Bar Council
- Supreme Court Bar Association of Pakistan
- Lahore High Court Bar Association
- Lahore Bar Association
