= Raheel Kamran Sheikh =

Justice of the Lahore High Court

- راحیل کامران شیخ

Justice of the Lahore High Court
- Incumbent
- Assumed office 7 May 2021

Personal details
- Born: 21 January 1974 (age 52)
- Parent: Akram Sheikh (father)
- Education: London School of Economics (LLB); Middle Temple (Barrister)

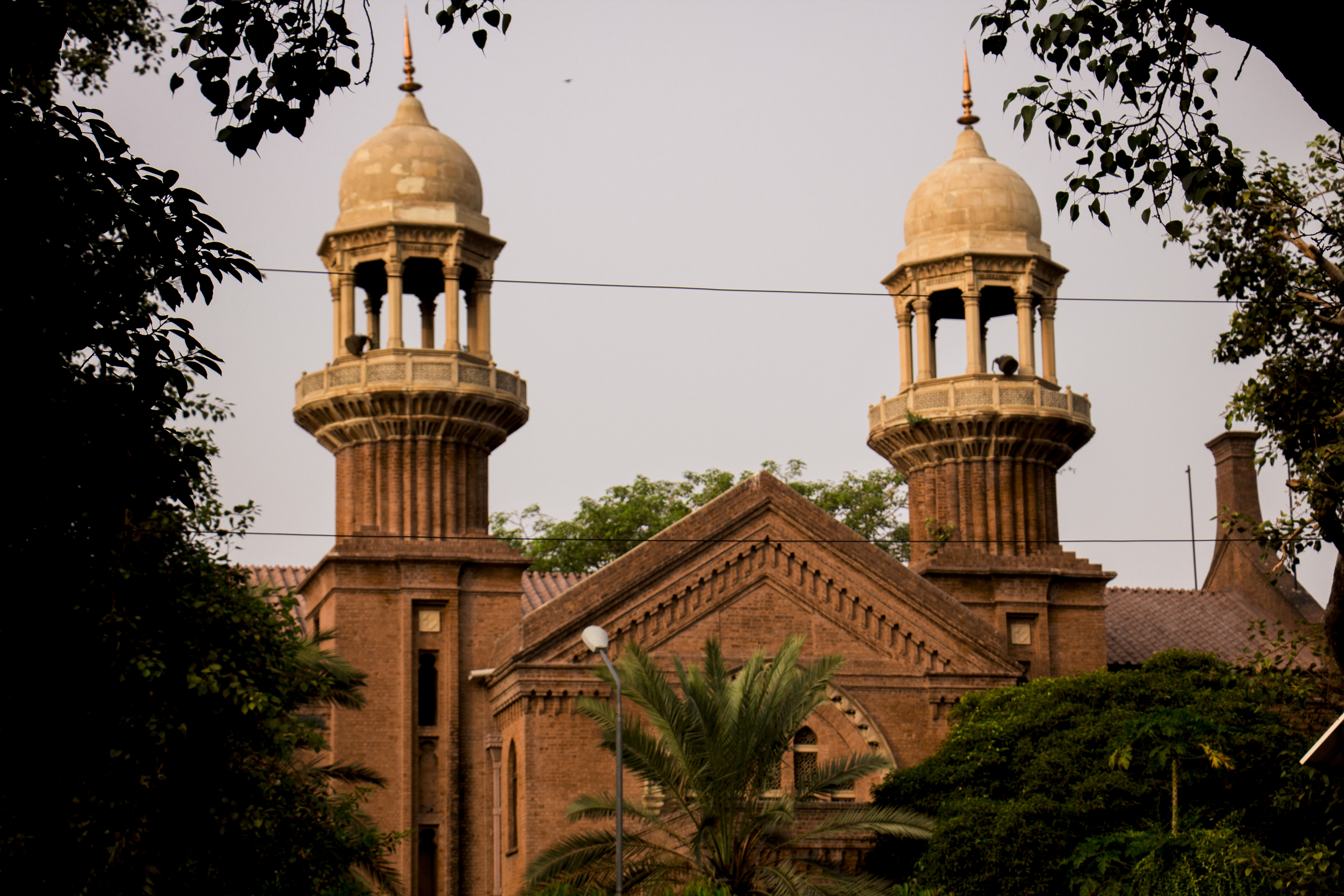
Lahore High Court

Raheel Kamran Sheikh (Urdu: راحیل کامران شیخ, born 21 January 1974) is a Pakistani jurist and Justice of the Lahore High Court.

== Education ==
Sheikh is a law graduate of the London School of Economics and a Barrister of the Middle Temple.

== Career ==
Sheikh was admitted as an Advocate of the High Courts on 22 April 2000 and of the Supreme Court of Pakistan (SCP) on 27 September 2012. Throughout his legal career, Sheikh was elected as a Member of the Pakistan Bar Council (PBC), serving a five-year term (2016–2020). He held the positions of Chairman of the Human Rights Committee and Member of the executive committee during his tenure. Sheikh's legal practice encompassed various areas, including public law, commercial law, taxation, regulatory regimes, white-collar crimes, and human rights.

He firmly supports the involvement of Parliament in the appointment of judges. In line with this stance, on 10 June 2017, as a senior member of PBC, he advocated for Parliament's role in appointing an ad hoc judge for the International Court of Justice to preside over the Kulbhushan Jadhav case, rather than leaving the decision solely to the government.

In his capacity as a PBC member, on 24 July 2018, he insisted that a full SCP bench should adjudicate a case involving Islamabad High Court judge Shaukat Aziz Siddiqui. Siddiqui had accused the then head of Inter-Services Intelligence, General Faiz Hameed, of influencing the court proceedings against former Prime Minister of Pakistan Nawaz Sharif.

Sheikh took on the role of additional justice at Lahore High Court (LHC) on 7 May 2021. The Judicial Commission of Pakistan, led by then Chief Justice of Pakistan Umar Ata Bandial, officially sanctioned his appointment as a permanent judge of LHC on 13 October 2022. He subsequently formally pledged as a permanent judge of LHC on 4 November 2022.
