= National Testing Service =

Academic testing service in Pakistan

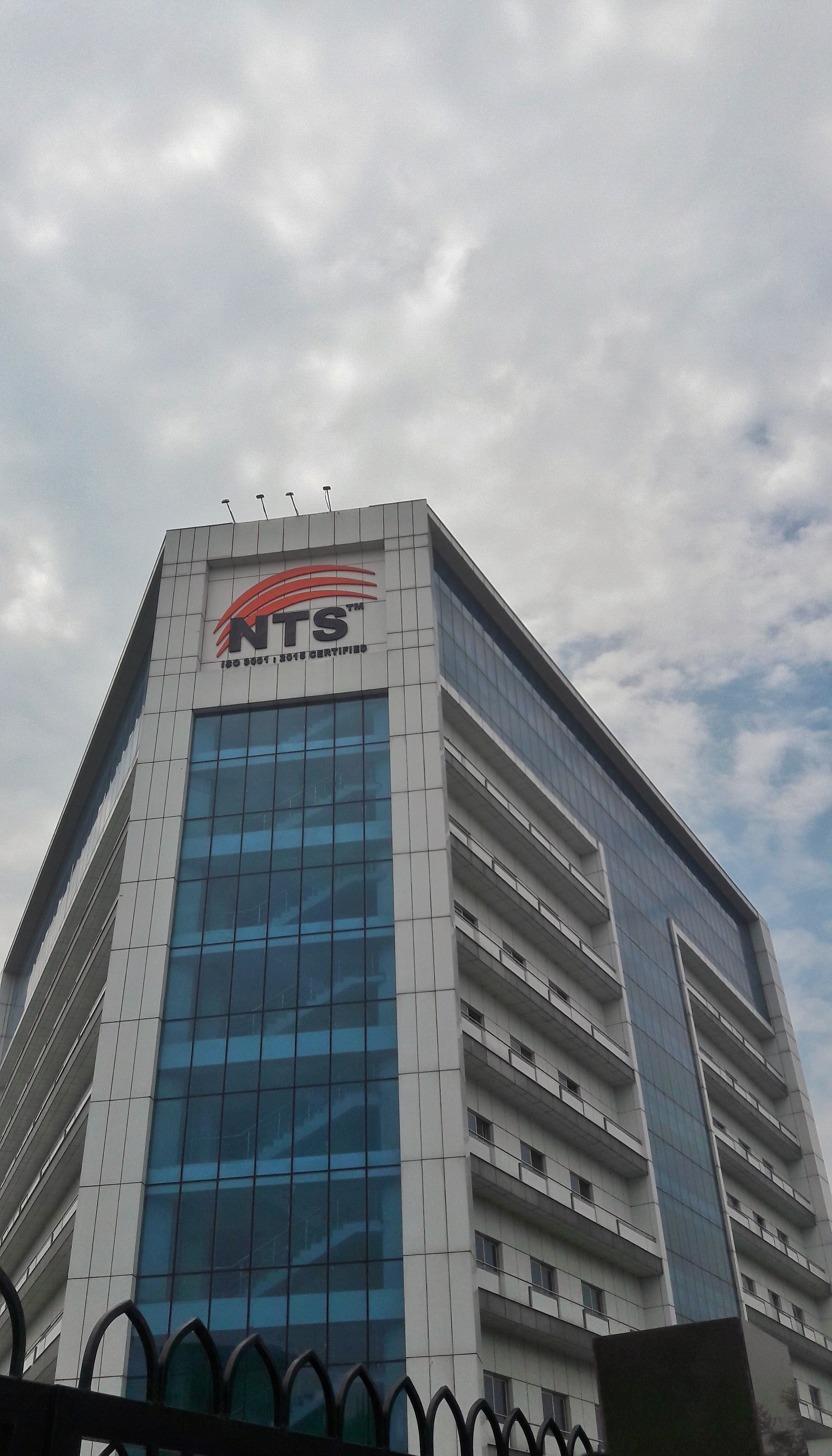
- NTS head office, Islamabad, Pakistan
- Native name: نیشنل ٹیسٹنگ سروس
- Company type: Public
- Founded: 2006; 20 years ago
- Headquarters: Plot 96, Street 4, H-8/1, Islamabad
- Key people: Tahir Aqeel (CEO)
- Products: Graduate Assessment Test - General; Graduate Assessment Test - Subject; Law Graduate Assessment Test; National Aptitude Test; National Teachers Database Program; Medical Representatives Certification Program
- Services: Standardized testing
- Website: nts.org.pk

National Testing Service - Pakistan (NTS) is a nonprofit organization in Pakistan that administers academic performance evaluation tests. It is a member of the International Association for Educational Assessment and the Higher Education Commission.

NTS offers two main types of tests, the National Aptitude Test (NAT) and the Graduate Assessment Test (GAT).

NTS was formed to ensure quality educational standards in Pakistan and to "provide a national scale for comparative grading between institutes", consolidating examination boards under one administrating body. Tests implemented prior to the development of the NTS were criticized as not accommodating socio-cultural differences, resulting in a need for "an indigenous testing service that should design and develop testing materials within an indigenous context".

== History ==
Controversy erupted in 2007 following the mandating of NTS testing, first announced by Governor of Punjab, with regards to admission to universities and later set aside by the government unless the laws regarding university admission were amended. Criticism included allegations that the services were inconvenient to access and prohibitively expensive to economically challenged students. Maqbool called for input from the vice-chancellors of Punjab's public universities on 4 June. That year, each university department was permitted to set its own entrance requirements, with six of 64 departments at Punjab University electing to utilize tests from NTS. In October 2007, the vice-chancellor of Punjab University, Muhammad Arif Butt, endorsed the use of NTS testing in all departments of the university. NTS director Haroon Rasheed said that no tuition centres are associated with the service and NTS exams will not be out of course.

== Legal education ==
In 2016 the Pakistan Bar Council amended the Legal Practitioners and Bar Councils Rules 1976 pertaining to admission of new advocates to the provincial Bar Councils. The new rules required applicants to sit and pass the Law Graduate Assessment Test (Law GAT) conducted by National Testing Service.
