= List of Pakistani lawyers =

This is a list of notable Pakistanis who are practicing or had practiced as a lawyer in Pakistan

- Abdul Ghafoor Bhurgri
- Ahmad Awais Advocate General Punjab
- Ahmad Raza Khan Kasuri
- Aitzaz Ahsan, barrister of Gray's Inn
- Akram Sheikh
- A. K. Brohi
- Ashtar Ausaf Ali
- Asif Ali Malik
- Asma Jahangir, Senior ASC
- Babar Awan
- Fakhruddin G. Ebrahim
- Farogh Naseem
- Hamid Khan (lawyer)
- Khalid Jawed Khan, Barrister of Lincoln's Inn
- Khalid Ranjha
- Latif Afridi
- Latif Khosa
- Liaquat Ali Khan, barrister of Inner Temple
- Mahmud Ali Kasuri
- Makhdoom Ali Khan
- Muhammad Ali Jinnah, barrister of Lincoln's Inn
- Mumtaz Mustafa
- Naeem Bokhari
- Naseer Ahmed Bhutta
- Rana Mashhood Ahmad Khan
- Rashid Rehman
- Salman Aslam Butt
- Shakeel ur Rahman Khan
- Sharifuddin Pirzada, barrister of Lincoln's Inn
- Syed Ali Zafar
- Wasim Sajjad
- Zulfikar Ali Bhutto, barrister of Lincoln's Inn

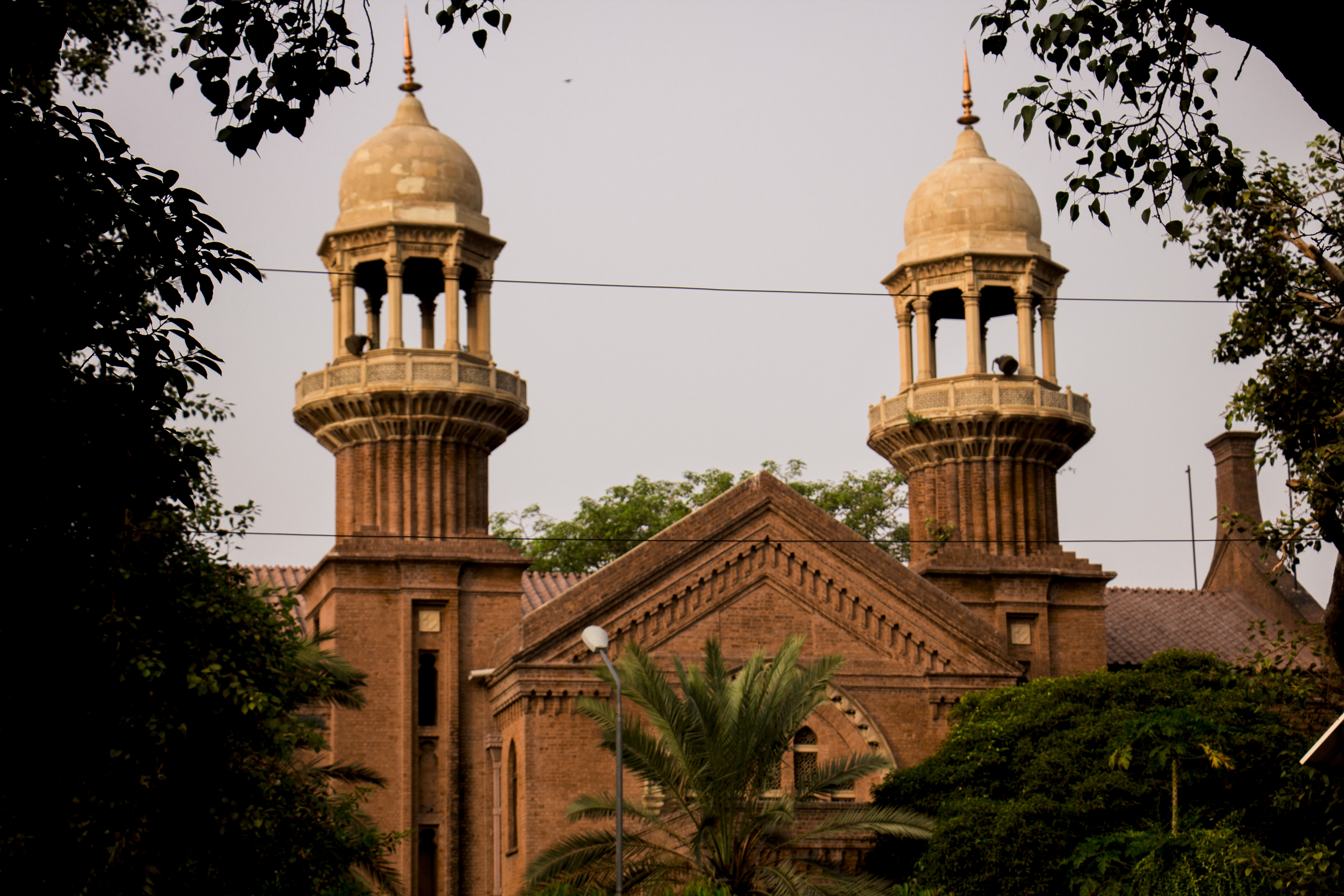
Lahore High Court
