= University of Azad Jammu & Kashmir =

Public University located in Azad Kashmir, Pakistan

University of Azad Jammu and Kashmir
- جامعہ آزاد جموں و کشمیر (Urdu); آزاد جۆم تہٕ کٔشیٖر ژاٹہٕ ہال (Kashmiri)
- Other name: UAJK
- Motto: Enter to learn, leave to serve!
- Type: Public
- Established: 1980
- Affiliations: Pakistan Engineering Council; Higher Education Commission of Pakistan; Azad Jammu and Kashmir Bar Council; National Computing Education Accreditation Council
- Academic staff: 800 to 850
- Administrative staff: 650 to 700
- Students: 15,000 to 16,000
- Undergraduates: 9,000 to 10,000
- Postgraduates: 5,000 to 6,000
- Location: Muzaffarabad, Azad Jammu & Kashmir, Pakistan
- Campus: Urban and rural
- Language: English and Urdu
- Colours: Blue and white
- Mascot: AJKUian
- Website: www.ajku.edu.pk

The University of Azad Jammu and Kashmir (Urdu: جامعہ آزاد جموں و کشمیر; Kashmiri: آزاد جۆم تہٕ کٔشیٖر ژاٹہٕ ہال) is located in Muzaffarabad, Azad Jammu and Kashmir, Pakistan.

== Recognized university ==
The university was established in 1980, and is currently ranked at No.16 in Higher Education Commission of Pakistan ranking of general category of universities in Pakistan.

== Basic Information, Faculties and Departments ==
It is a multi discipline and multi campus university. The University of Azad Jammu and Kashmir is the biggest educational institution in Azad Jammu and Kashmir. It consists of four faculties i.e., faculty of sciences, faculty of arts, faculty of health sciences and faculty of engineering.

Faculty of Sciences

- Department of Botany
- Department of Zoology
- Department of Computer Sciences and Information technology
- Department of Biotechnology
- Kashmir Institute of Geology
- Department of Mathematics
- Department of Statistics
- Department of Physics
- Department of Chemistry

Faculty of Arts

- Department of Islamic Studies
- Department of Law
- Department of Management Sciences
- Department of Psychology
- Department of Sociology and Rural Development
- Department of Urdu Language
- Institute of Kashmir Studies
- Institute of Languages
- Kashmir Institute of Economics

Faculty of Engineering

- Department of Electrical Engineering
- Department of Software Engineering

Faculty of Medical and Health Sciences

- Department of Public Health Sciences
- Department of Allied Health Sciences

== See also ==
- List of institutions of higher education in Azad Kashmir
- List of Islamic educational institutions
- List of medical schools in Pakistan
  - List of medical schools in Islamabad
  - List of medical schools in Punjab, Pakistan
  - List of medical schools in Sindh
  - List of medical schools in Balochistan
  - List of medical schools in Khyber Pakhtunkhwa
  - List of medical schools in Azad Kashmir
  - List of medical schools in Gilgit-Baltistan
- Pakistan Academy of Sciences
- National Technology Council
- List of universities in Pakistan
  - List of universities in Islamabad
  - List of universities in Punjab, Pakistan
  - List of universities in Sindh
  - List of universities in Khyber Pakhtunkhwa
  - List of universities in Balochistan
  - List of universities in Azad Kashmir
  - List of universities in Gilgit-Baltistan
