= Hamid Khan (lawyer) =

Pakistani lawyer (born 1946)

Member of the Senate of Pakistan
- Incumbent
- Assumed office April 2021
- President: Asif Ali Zardari
- Prime Minister: Shehbaz Sharif
- Constituency: General seat from Punjab

President of the Supreme Court Bar Association of Pakistan
- In office 2001–2003
- Preceded by: Abdul Haleem Pirzada
- Succeeded by: Tariq Mehmood

Central Senior Vice-President of PTI
- Incumbent
- Assumed office 25 April 1996
- Appointed by: Imran Khan; Gohar Ali Khan

Vice Chairman of the Pakistan Bar Council
- In office 1996–1997
- Preceded by: Latif Khosa
- Succeeded by: Ali Ahmed Kurd

President of the Lahore High Court Bar Association
- In office 1990–1992
- Preceded by: A Karim Malik
- Succeeded by: Muhammad Kazim Khan

Personal details
- Born: Lahore, Punjab, British India
- Party: PTI (1996-present)
- Spouse: Gulnaz Khan
- Children: Sikandar, Farhad, Dilawar and Fizza
- Education: University of Punjab, University of Illinois
- Occupation: Lawyer, Advisor & politician

Supreme Court of Pakistan where office Pakistan Bar Council is situated

Hamid Khan (Urdu: حامد خان; born 16 April 1946) is a Pakistani politician, supreme court lawyer who is currently serving as the Senator in the Senate of Pakistan. He is also Senior Vice-President of Pakistan Tehreek-e-Insaf. He remained member Pakistan Bar Council from 1990 to 2015 (for five consecutive terms, comprising 5 years of each term). He is also head of Professional group of Lawyers, which is the largest group in Bar/Lawyers politics of Pakistan. He is the senior partner of the oldest law firm of Pakistan; Cornelius, Lane & Mufti. He remained president of Supreme Court Bar Association of Pakistan from 2001 to 2003.

== Educational background ==
Hamid Khan wrote several books that are recommended reading for Pakistani students of law. Hamid Khan studied law at the University of Punjab and University of Illinois and has been practising for over 45 years.

== Personal life ==
Hamid Khan is married to Gulnaz Khan and has three sons and one daughter. One of his sons, Sikandar, is also a lawyer. Hamid Khan has six granddaughters and one grandson (Rubeena, Malaak, Paniz, Saviz, Shiza, Sophia and Shershah). His daughter-in-law, Shirin Sadeghi, is an Al-Jazeera English contributor. She is married to his third son, Dilawar.

== Professional background ==
Khan a prominent lawyer has served as the chairman executive committee (CEC) and vice-chairman of Pakistan Bar Council, former vice-chairman of Punjab Bar Council, former President of the Supreme Court Bar Association of Pakistan. In earlier positions he served as the president of the Lahore High Court Bar Association (1992–93). He is an advocate of the Supreme Court and High Courts of Pakistan and is one of the founding partners of Cornelius, Lane and Mufti, a law firm based at Lahore.

== Lawyer of chief justice ==
Khan was the lawyer of the chief justice of Pakistan, Mr. Justice Iftikhar Muhammad Chaudhry, when General Pervez Musharraf put forward a reference against the chief justice and Chaudhary decided to defend his case in the court. Hamid Khan contributed considerably to the Lawyers' Movement of Pakistan, which led to the restoration of Chaudhry as Chief Justice of Pakistan. Khan regularly lectures on various legal subjects at Punjab University, the Civil Services Academy, the National Institute of Public Administration and the Pakistan Administrative Staff College.

== Books authored ==
He has authored six books on legal subjects, three of which-Islamic Law of Inheritance, Principles of Administrative Law and Administrative Tribunals for civil Servants in Pakistan-are prescribed as Textbooks at law schools. He is an Ebert and DAAD Fellow, as well as a member of The Hague Academy of International Law. His book "Constitutional and Political History of Pakistan" is taught at the LLB level, and is a comprehensive reference on the making of Pakistan. His books are also taught at the LLM level.

- Constitutional and Political History of Pakistan (2001)

This constitutional book highlights constitutional history and development of Pakistan from 1947 to 2001. The book contains the details of Supreme Court cases on constitution and political history of Pakistan. This book also focused the role of Pakistani politician, generals, judges, politicians and general public.

- A History of the Judiciary in Pakistan (2016)

This book analyses the impact of Pakistan's judicial history and its far reaching consequence on the country. It also high light way of passing judgements by Pakistani judges and their mind set. This book is recommended for legal education in University and law colleges.

- Principles of Administrative Law: A Comparative Study (2012)

This book defines the Administrative Law is a main source for public law and offer an complete study for advocates, judges, students, teachers, and office administrators. It presents a comparative views of the basic principles of administrative law, interpreted by superior judiciary in Pakistan and others countries. It also focused the necessary principles and basic concepts of administrative law.

- The Islamic Law of Inheritance (1999)

This book highlights concept of Islamic Law as a necessary component of the life style of Muslims including Personal Law. This book is for the students of law, it added up to date case law of Pakistan.

- Constitutional & Political Crisis in Pakistan (1994)

This book describes the constitutional and political crises in Pakistan.

- Comparative Constitutional Law (2008)

This book is a necessary tool for practicing lawyers who argue in Superior Courts particularly on Constitutional disputes. It includes the subjects of political concept, fundamental of legal issues, rule of law and human rights violations.

== Selected bibliography ==
- Constitutional and Political History of Pakistan (Hardcover – 31 August 2001)
- Islamic law of inheritance: A comparative study with emphasis on contemporary problems (Unknown Binding – 1980)
- Constitutional and Political History of Pakistan (Paperback – 21 April 2005)
- The last defender of constitutional reason? Pakistan’s embattled Supreme Court, in: Constitutionalism in Islamic Countries: Between Upheaval and Continuity. Oxford University Press, Oxford / New York, 2011 (Rainer Grote / Tilmann Röder, eds.).

== See also ==
- Supreme Court Bar Association of Pakistan
- Lahore High Court Bar Association
- Pakistan Bar Council
- Punjab Bar Council
- Lahore Bar Association
