= State bar association =

US-based legal association representing attorneys

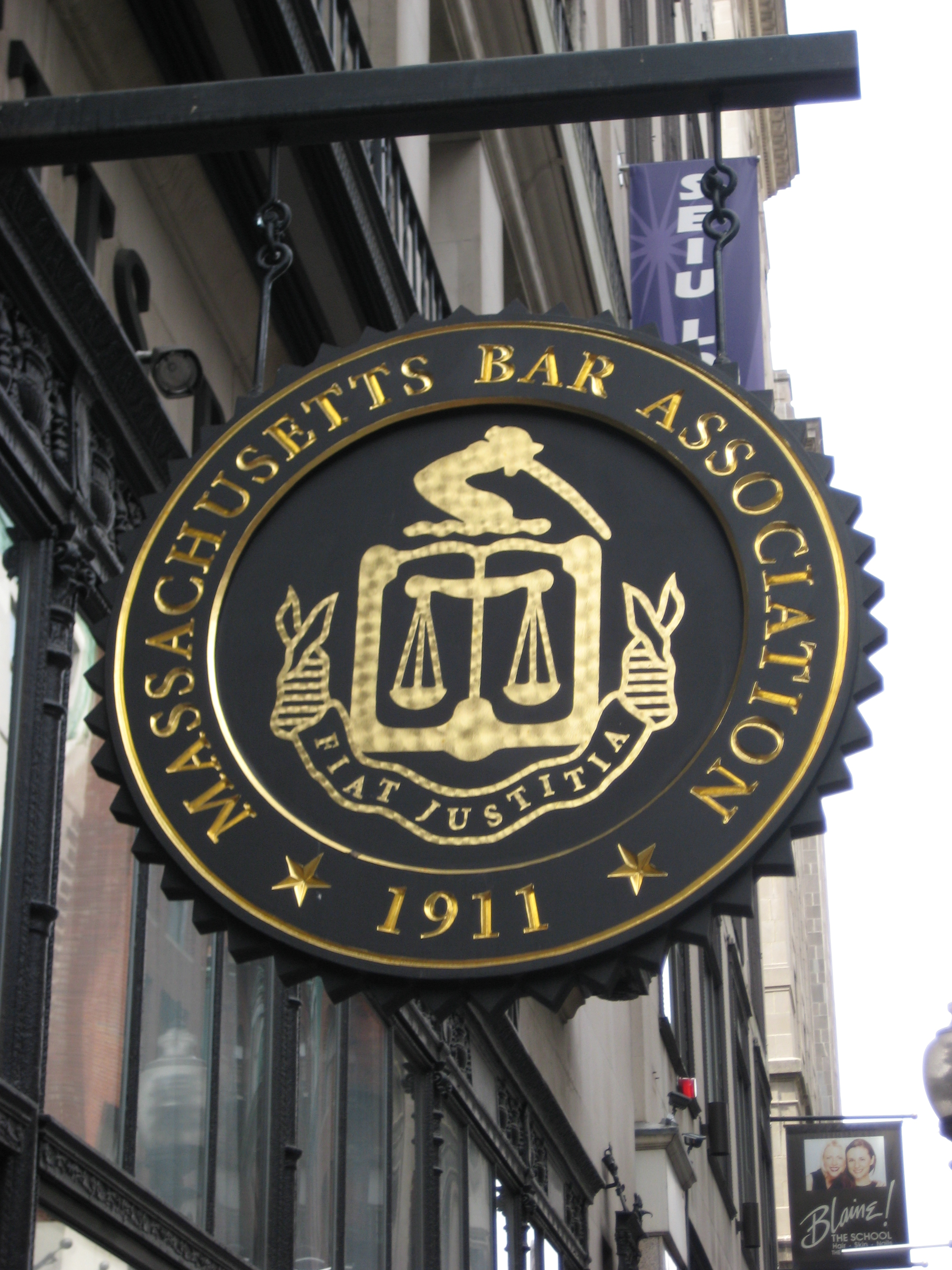
Sign outside the Massachusetts Bar Association in Boston

A state bar association is a bar association that represents or seeks to represent the attorneys practicing law in a particular U.S. state. Their functions differ from state to state, but often include administration of the state bar examination for admission of attorneys to practice law, regulation of continuing legal education (CLE) and other requirements, collection and monitoring of attorney client trust accounts, collection of fees and discipline of attorneys for ethical or other violations. Some state bars also provide services for members such as maintaining a directory of attorneys in the state, facilitating networking and social events for attorneys, publishing a bar journal and providing classes to fulfill CLE requirements.

== Voluntary and mandatory bars ==
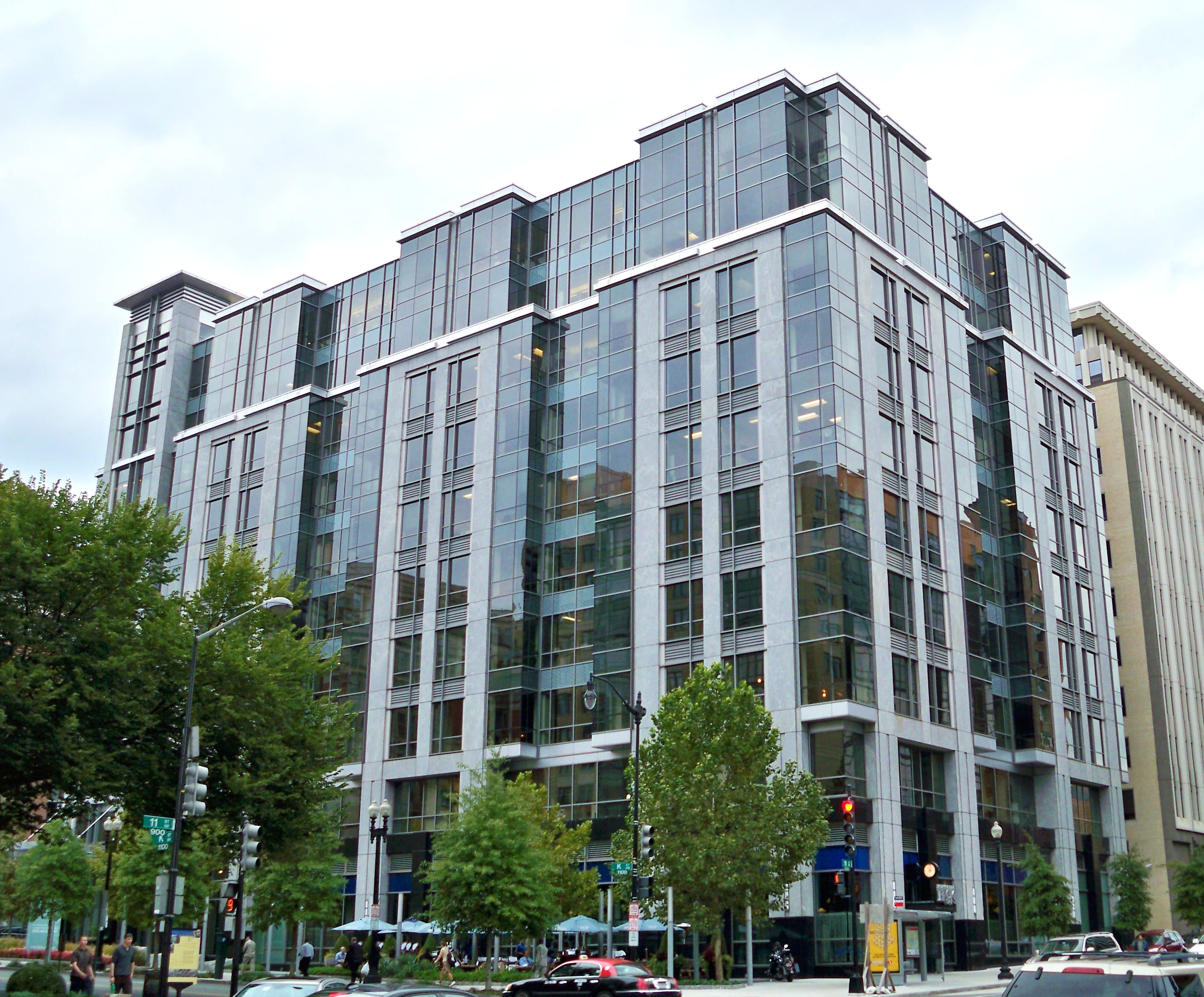
Headquarters of the District of Columbia Bar

A mandatory or integrated bar association is one to which a state delegates the authority to regulate the admission of attorneys to practice in that state; typically these require membership in that bar association to practice in that state. Mandatory bars derive their power from legislative statute and/or from the power of the state court system to regulate practice before it.

In the other states, membership in the bar associations is voluntary. In some states, a mandatory organization exists primarily for the purpose of regulating admission to practice, while a voluntary organization exists for other purposes. For example, in Virginia, the Virginia State Bar is the mandatory organization and the Virginia Bar Association is voluntary.

There are many bar associations other than state bar associations. Usually these are organized by geography (e.g. county bar associations), area of practice, or affiliation (e.g. ethnic bar associations).

== Continuing legal education requirements ==
The rules of most state bar associations require members to complete continuing legal education (CLE) requirements, and also offer courses for lawyers in their area, with discounts to members of the particular bar association. A great many organizations offer CLE programs, including most or all state bar associations. Uniquely, the Kentucky Bar Association offers a two-day program known as Kentucky Law Update, conducted in at least seven locations throughout the state, that allows its members to satisfy their annual CLE requirement without a registration fee.

== See also ==
- Navajo Nation Bar Association
