= Ali Ahmad Kurd =

Pakistani lawyer (born 1948)

- على احمد كُرد

Vice Chairman of the Pakistan Bar Council
- In office 2007–2008
- Preceded by: Hamid Khan (lawyer)
- Succeeded by: Latif Khosa

Personal details
- Born: 1948 (age 77–78) Quetta, Baluchistan, Pakistan

Ali Ahmad Kurd (Urdu: على احمد كُرد) is a Pakistani lawyer, who served as the president of the Supreme Court Bar Association of Pakistan and was one of the most prominent figures in the Lawyers' Movement of 2007. He opposed the military government of Pervez Musharraf, who ruled the country from 1999 to 2008.

== Activism ==
While vice-chairman of the Balochistan Bar Association in 2002, Ali Ahmad Kurd staged a protest burning of amendments to the constitution that had been proposed by Musharraf. The action formed part of wider protests by lawyers' associations, religious bodies and political parties in reaction to what they perceived to be attempts by Musharraf to undermine his opponents and consolidate his own power.

Kurd was briefly detained on 29 April 2007 in Quetta on the charges of inciting people during an absentia funeral of Nawab Akbar Bugti a year earlier. His detention was protested by lawyers and police released him, claiming that there had been no arrest and that the matter was a misunderstanding. Kurd was at that time vice-chairman of the Pakistan Bar Council.

After imposing martial law in Pakistan on 3 November 2007, Musharraf suspended the constitution and Kurd was among those placed under house arrest. He was released in March 2008.

Later, in March 2009 when President of the Supreme Court Bar Association, Kurd led protests by lawyers seeking the return of an independent judiciary. These protests were influential in the reinstatement of Iftikhar Mohammed Chaudhry as Chief Justice. Chaudhry had been removed from his position by Musharraf and the decision was not reversed under the presidency of Asif Ali Zardari until the lawyers began a mass march from Lahore to Islamabad that was supported by large crowds and coincided with rioting.

In 2012, Kurd was considered as a nominee for the post of Chief Election Commissioner of Pakistan by the Pakistan Muslim League-Nawaz but was ruled out of contention due to constitutional ineligibility. He had also been considered as a possible caretaker prime minister.

== See also ==
- Fakhruddin G. Ebrahim
