= Tariq Mahmood (judge) =

Pakistani lawyer and judge

Justice Tariq Mahmood
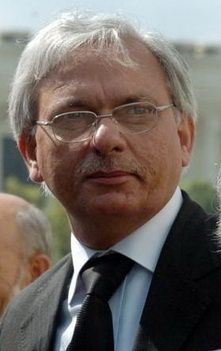

Justice Balochistan High Court

Personal details
- Born: Pakistan
- Profession: Lawyer, judge

Tariq Mahmood (Urdu: طارق محمود) is a Pakistani lawyer and former judge. Born in Pakistan, he is most famous as a leader of the Lawyers' Movement in Pakistan.

As a judge of the Balochistan High Court, he refused to take an oath under General Pervez Musharraf. He lived in Quetta for a while.

Mahmood was also the former president of Supreme Court Bar Association of Pakistan.

He was also in the panel of lawyers of Chief Justice Iftikhar Chaudhry's suspension case of presidential reference in the Supreme Judicial Council of Pakistan. He was arrested and detained with his family during the 2007 state of emergency.

Justice Tariq frequently appears on a number of popular TV talk news shows and is known for his candid and honest views.

== Quotes ==
- Either I could lie to save my job, or tell the truth to save my character.

== See also ==
- Pakistan Bar Council (PBC)
