= Bar association =

Professional body of lawyers

A bar association is a professional association of lawyers as generally organized in countries following the Anglo-American types of jurisprudence. The word bar is derived from the old English/European custom of using a physical railing (bar) to separate the area in which court or legal profession business is done from the viewing area for the general public or students of the law.

Some bar associations are responsible for the regulation of the legal profession in their jurisdiction; others are professional organizations dedicated to serving their members; in many cases, they are both. In many Commonwealth jurisdictions, the bar association comprises lawyers who are qualified as barristers or advocates in particular, versus solicitors (see bar council). Membership in bar associations may be mandatory (necessary to practice law) or optional (voluntary) for practicing attorneys, depending on jurisdiction.

== Etymology ==
The use of the term bar to mean "the whole body of lawyers, the legal profession" comes ultimately from English custom. In the early 16th century, a railing divided the hall in the Inns of Court, with students occupying the body of the hall and readers or benchers on the other side. Students who officially became lawyers crossed the symbolic physical barrier and were "admitted to the bar". Later, this was popularly assumed to mean the wooden railing marking off the area around the judge's seat in a courtroom, where prisoners stood for arraignment and where a barrister stood to plead. In modern courtrooms, a railing may still be in place to enclose the space which is occupied by legal counsel as well as the criminal defendants and civil litigants who have business pending before the court.

== In Commonwealth jurisdictions ==
In many Commonwealth jurisdictions, including in England and Wales, the "bar association" comprises lawyers who are qualified as barristers or advocates (collectively known as "the bar", or "members of the bar"), while the "law society" comprises solicitors. These bodies are sometimes mutually exclusive, while in other jurisdictions, the "bar" may refer to the entire community of persons engaged in the practice of law.

=== Canada ===
In Canada, one is called to the bar after undertaking a post-law-school training in a provincial law society program, and undergoing an apprenticeship or taking articles. Legal communities are called provincial law societies, except for Nova Scotia, where it is called the Nova Scotia Barristers' Society, and Quebec, where it is called the Barreau du Quebec.

The Canadian Bar Association (and its provincial and territorial branches) is a professional association of barristers, solicitors and advocates that serves the roles of advocates for the profession, provides continuing legal education and member benefits. It does not play a part in the regulation of the profession, however.

=== India ===
In India under the legal framework set established under the Advocates Act, 1961, a law graduate is required to be enrolled with the Bar Council of India. The process of enrollment is delegated by the Bar Council of India to the state Bar Councils wherein almost each state has a Bar Council of its own. Once enrolled with a State Bar Council, the law graduate is recognized as an Advocate provisionally for a period of two years, within which they must clear the All India Bar Examination (AIBE) conducted by the Bar Council of India. Once the advocate clears the AIBE test, they are entitled to appear and practice before any court of law in India.

There is no formal requirement for further membership of any Bar Association. However, Advocates do become members of various local or national bar associations for reasons of recognition and facilities which these associations offer. Some well-known Bar Associations in India include the Supreme Court Bar Association, Delhi High Court Bar Association, Bombay Bar Association, Delhi Bar Association, National Bar Association of India, All India Bar Association, etc.

=== Pakistan ===
In Pakistan, a person becomes a licensee of a Provincial Bar Council after fulfilling certain requirements. He must have a valid law degree LL.B from a recognized university by the Pakistan Bar Council, must offer certain undertakings, and pay the Provincial Bar Council fees. Furthermore, he shall join any bar association as a member. Tehsil bar associations work under the umbrella of District Bar Association, District Bar Association under Provincial Bar councils, such as the Punjab Bar Council, Sindh Bar Council, Balochistan Bar Council and Khyber Pakhtunkhwa Bar Council. To become an advocate, one must first complete six months pupillage with a practising advocate of High Court, whom they must assist on at least ten cases during a six-month pupillage. Some well-known Bar Associations in Pakistan include the Supreme Court Bar Association of Pakistan, Lahore High Court Bar Association, Lahore Bar Association etc.

=== Sri Lanka ===
In Sri Lanka, a person becomes an Attorney-at-Law of the Supreme Court of Sri Lanka after completing passing law exams at the Sri Lanka Law College which are administered by the Council of Legal Education and spending a period of six months under a practicing attorney of at least eight years standing as an articled clerk. Attorneys may opt to become a member of the Bar Association of Sri Lanka.

== In the United States ==
Membership in the bar is a privilege burdened with conditions.

—Benjamin N. Cardozo, In re Rouss, 221 N.Y. 81, 84 (1917)

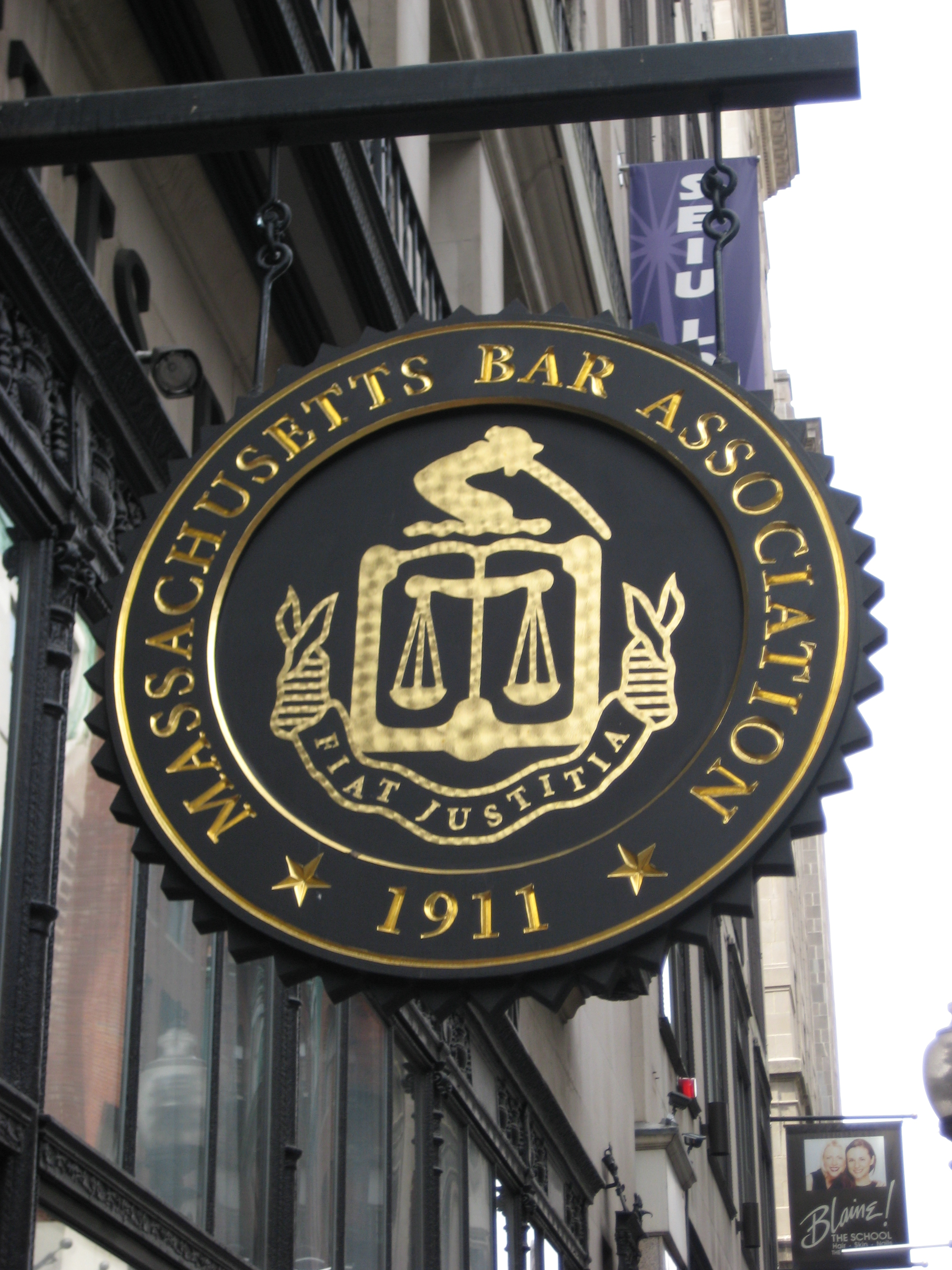
Sign outside the Massachusetts Bar Association in Boston, Massachusetts

In the United States, admission to the bar is permission granted by a particular court system to a lawyer to practice law in that system. This is to be distinguished from membership in a bar association. In the United States, some states require membership in the state bar association for all attorneys, while others do not.

Although bar associations historically existed as unincorporated voluntary associations, nearly all bar associations have since been organized (or reorganized) as corporations. Furthermore, membership in some of them (see the next section below) is no longer voluntary, which is why some of them have omitted the word "association" and merely call themselves the "state bar" to indicate that they are the incorporated body that constitutes the entire admitted legal profession of a state.

=== Mandatory, integrated, or unified bar associations ===
Some states require membership in a regulatory agency often called the state's bar association in order to permit them to practice law in that state. Such an organization is called a mandatory, integrated, or unified bar, and is a type of government-granted monopoly. They exist at present in a majority of U.S. states: Alabama, Alaska, Arizona, Florida, Georgia, Hawaii, Idaho, Kentucky, Louisiana, Maine, Michigan, Mississippi, Missouri, Montana, Nebraska, Nevada, New Hampshire, New Mexico, North Dakota, Oklahoma, Oregon, Rhode Island, South Carolina, South Dakota, Texas, Utah, Virginia, Washington State, West Virginia, Wisconsin, and Wyoming.

The District of Columbia, the U.S. Virgin Islands, Guam and the Northern Mariana Islands also have unified bars. The mandatory status of the Puerto Rico Bar Association was eliminated in 2009 by an act of the legislature, and ratified by the recently appointed majority of the Puerto Rico Supreme Court. By act of the Puerto Rico legislature, the mandatory status was reinstated in June 2014. The Supreme Court of Puerto Rico struck down this act in October 2014, finding that it unconstitutionally usurped its powers.

In some states, like Wisconsin, the mandatory membership requirement is implemented through an order of the state supreme court, which can be revoked or canceled at any time at the court's discretion. In others, like Oregon, the state legislature passed a law and created a government agency. California went farther than any other state and wrote the State Bar of California into its constitution.

The first state to have an integrated bar association was North Dakota in 1921.

=== Voluntary bar associations ===
Although the names may be confusing, a voluntary bar association is a private organization of lawyers and often other legal professionals. These associations focus on issues including social, educational, and lobbying functions. In states where the functions of the disciplinary bar entity is separate from the statewide voluntary bar association, the voluntary association does not, however, formally regulate the practice of law, admit lawyers to practice or discipline lawyers for ethical violations. For example, the "State Bar of California" is the mandatory, regulatory agency whereas the California Lawyers Association is a voluntary educational and networking group. A statewide voluntary bar association exists in every state that has no mandatory or integrated bar association.

In addition to state-wide organizations, there are many voluntary bar associations organized by city, county, or other affiliate community. Such associations are often focused on common professional interests (such as bankruptcy lawyers or in-house counsel) or common ethnic interests (such as gender, race, religion, or national heritage), such as the Hispanic National Bar Association or Los Angeles County Bar Association.

Such associations often advocate for law reform and provide information in bar journals, pro bono services or a lawyer referral service to the general public. In 2017, the California State Legislature split off the education, lobbying, and young lawyers sections of that state's Bar in order to create the voluntary California Lawyers Association. This split was done to finalize the rationale and holding of a 1990 ruling which prohibited the required bar registration fees from being used for political purposes, relying on the First Amendment of the U.S. Constitution.

All attorney regulation is performed on the state level (while federal courts also regulate the attorneys that appear before them, those attorneys generally must be already qualified by the states). There is no mandatory federal bar association. The Federal Bar Association is a private, voluntary group.

There are also a number of subject-specific private associations, which are not denominated as bar associations by name but which serve similar functions in terms of providing their members with useful publications, networking opportunities, and continuing legal education. The largest association of defense counsel is the Defense Research Institute, which describes itself as "The Voice of the Defense Bar", while the largest association of plaintiffs' counsel is the American Association for Justice (formerly the Association of Trial Lawyers of America). The American Bar Association (ABA) is the largest voluntary bar association in the United States with members from both defense, plaintiff, civil, criminal and other specialities. The National Lawyers Guild (NLG) is an association of progressive attorneys and legal workers, founded as the first national association for lawyers whose membership was open to all races and religions.

Most American law schools have a student bar association, which is a student organization that fulfills various functions, including sometimes serving as the student government.

=== Judges ===
Judges may or may not be members of the bar. Etymologically, they sit "on the bench", and the cases which come before them are "at bar" or "at bench". Many states in the United States require that some or all judges be members of the bar; typically these limit or completely prohibit the judges from practicing law while serving as a judge.

The United States Constitution contains no requirement that Federal judges or Supreme Court of the United States justices be members of the bar. However, there are no modern instances of the President of the United States nominating or the U.S. Senate providing advice and consent to any nominee who is not a member of any bar. The unofficial practice of the American Bar Association publicly rating the qualifications of judicial nominees has strengthened the imperative to nominate lawyers on the bar. There are various professional associations of judges, such as the American Judges Association, that perform some of the educational and other service functions of bar associations.

== See also ==
- Immigration lawyer
- Bar (law)
- Disbarment
- Law firm network
