= Fiaz Ahmad Anjum Jandran =

Pakistani jurist

Judge at Islamabad High Court
- Incumbent
- Assumed office December 13, 2020

Personal details
- Born: January 1, 1970 (age 56) Mandi Bahauddin

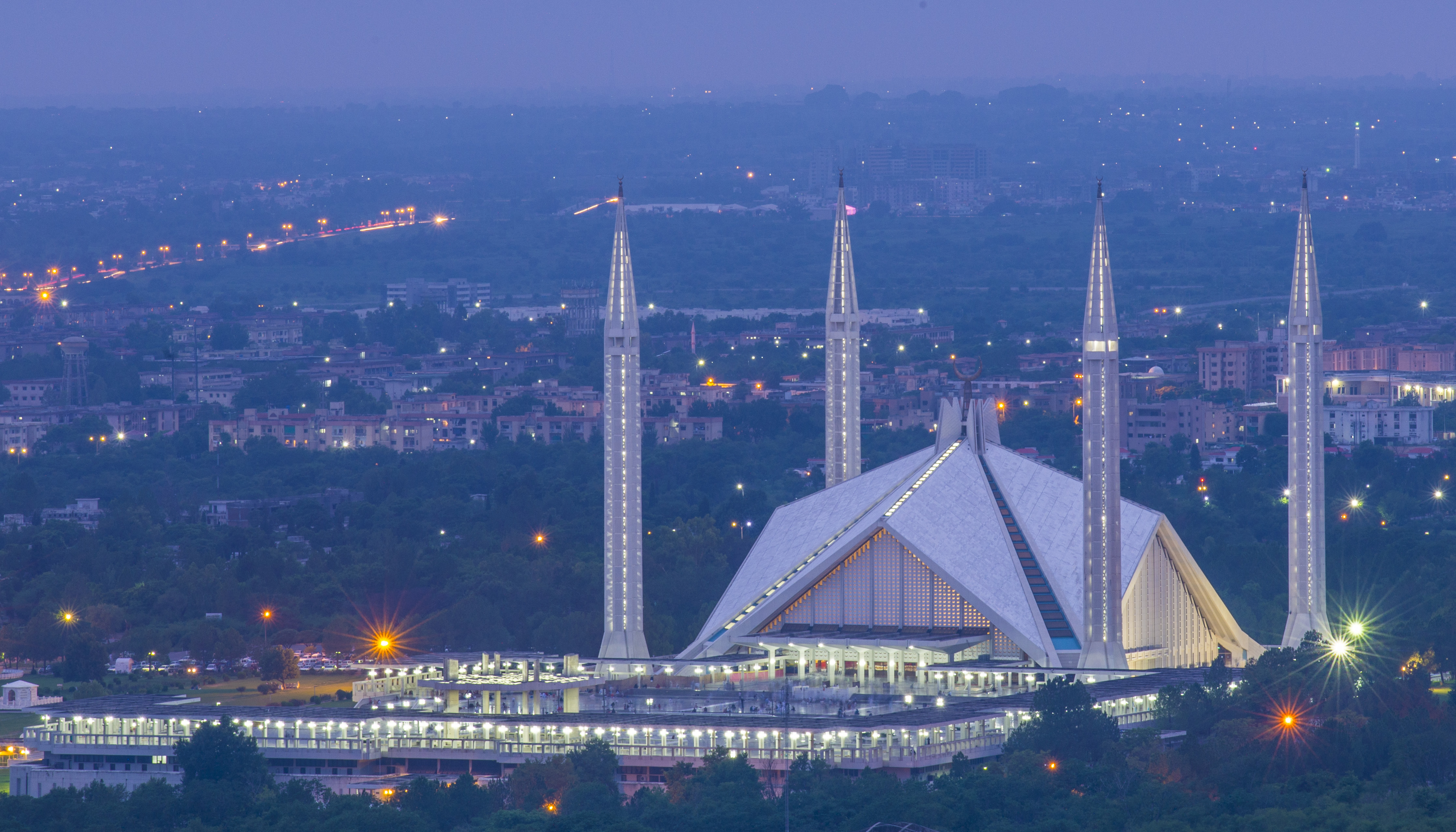
Islamabad

Fiaz Ahmad Anjum Jandran (born January 1, 1970, in Mandi Bahauddin, Pakistan) is a Pakistani jurist and a judge of the Islamabad High Court.

== Education ==
Jandran attended Board of Intermediate and Secondary Education where he obtained his First School Certificate in 1987. He then attended University of the Punjab where he matriculated in 1989. In 1994, he obtained his LLB degree from the University of the Punjab. He later got a master's degree in history from the same university.

== Career ==
Fiaz started his career in 1995 as an advocate and subsequently became a member of the Islamabad District Bar Association. In 1997 he was appointed an advocate for the Islamabad High Court. In 2010, he became an advocate of Supreme Court of Pakistan. Prior to his appointment as judge, he was the vice-chairman of the Islamabad Bar Council, chairman of the Legal Education Committee and member of the Commission of Legal Education, as constituted by the Supreme Court of Pakistan.

On December 13, 2020, he was appointed judge at the Islamabad High Court.
