= Shakeel ur Rahman =

Pakistani jurist and justice (1969–2021)

Jurist & Judge justice shakil ur Rehman Khan

Justice of the Lahore High Court
- In office 23 October 2018 – 14 February 2021
- President: Mamnoon Hussain
- Prime Minister: Shahid Khaqan Abbassi

Personal details
- Born: 15 February 1969 Lahore, Punjab, Pakistan
- Died: 16 November 2021 (aged 52)
- Parent: Justice Khalil ur Rahman (father)
- Education: University Law College Punjab University

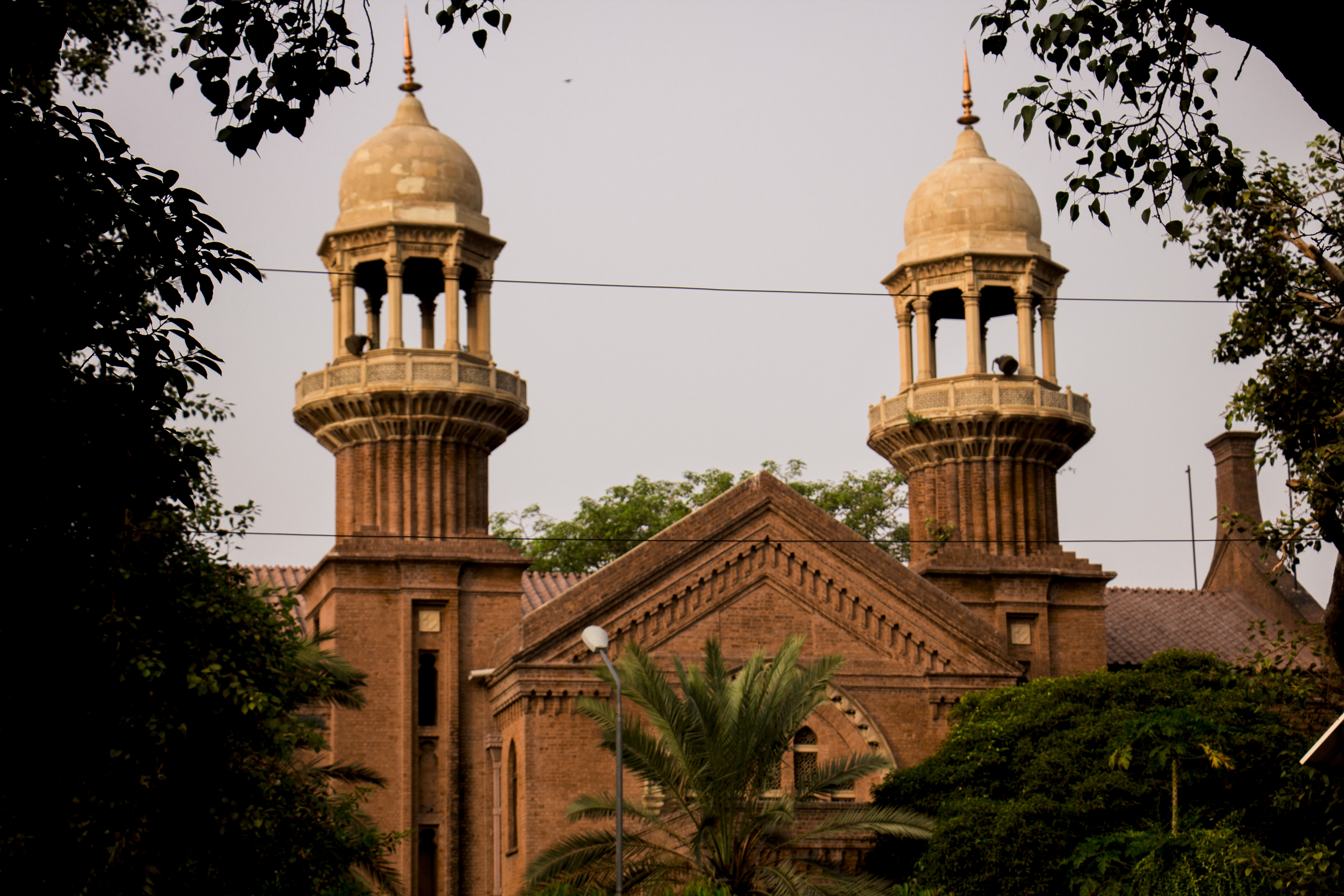
Lahore High Court

Shakil ur Rahman Khan (Persian: شکیل الرحمان خان; 15 February 1969 – 16 November 2021) was a Pakistani jurist who served as a judge of the Lahore High Court. Previously, he was the 36th Advocate General of Punjab, appointed by the Governor of Punjab on 7 March 2016. As Advocate General Punjab he was also an ex-officio chairman of the Punjab Bar Council. He had already served in this office (2009-2012) as Additional Advocate General Punjab and resigned from the post to continue his law practice as Advocate Supreme Court of Pakistan. He has also served the Punjab Healthcare Commission, PTCL and M/o NHSR &C as Senior Legal Advisor.

He was the son of former Justice Supreme Court of Pakistan and Chief Justice Lahore High Court, Justice Khalil ur Rahman Khan. His father had not taken oath under PCO of dictator General Musharaf. He has two sons Adv. Mustafa Rehman Khan and Moosa Rehman Khan. His younger brother is a doctor, Dr. Farid ur Rehman Khan. His younger brother is currently practicing as a doctor at his own clinic situated at Holy Family Road, Rawalpindi.

== Education and early life ==
Hailing from Lahore, born on 15 February 1969, after graduation he completed his law degree LL.B. from University Law College, Punjab University, Lahore.
