= Bachelor of Laws =

Type of undergraduate qualification

A Bachelor of Laws (Latin: Legum Baccalaureus; LLB) is an undergraduate law degree offered in most common law countries as the primary law degree and serves as the first professional qualification for lawyers. It typically requires the study of core legal subjects and jurisprudence to provide a comprehensive understanding of the legal system and its function. The LLB curriculum is designed to impart a thorough knowledge of legal principles, legal research skills, and a sound understanding of the roles and responsibilities of lawyers within society. This degree is often a prerequisite for taking bar exams or qualifying as a practising lawyer, depending on the jurisdiction. Additionally, the LLB program also serves as a foundation for further legal education, such as a Master of Laws (LLM) or other postgraduate studies in law.

== Regional usage ==
The Bachelor of Laws degree is awarded by universities in regions including Europe, Australia, China, Hong Kong, Macau, Malaysia, Bangladesh, India, Indonesia, Israel, Japan, Pakistan, Sri Lanka, Uganda, Kenya, Ghana, New Zealand, Nepal, Nigeria, Singapore, South Africa, Botswana, Brazil, Tanzania, Zambia, Zimbabwe, Malawi, and United Kingdom.

In the United States, the Bachelor of Laws was the primary law degree until the 1960s, when it was phased out in favor of the Juris Doctor. Canada followed suit in the early 21st century.

== History ==
The first academic degrees were all law degrees in medieval universities, and the first law degrees were doctorates. The foundations of the first universities were the glossators of the 11th century, which were also schools of law. The first university, that of Bologna, was founded as a school of law by four famous legal scholars in the 12th century who were students of the glossator school in that city. The University of Bologna served as the model for other law schools of the medieval age. While it was common for students of law to visit and study at schools in other countries, such was not the case with England because of the English rejection of Roman law (except for certain jurisdictions such as the Admiralty Court). Although the University of Oxford and the University of Cambridge did teach canon law until the English Reformation, its importance was always superior to civil law in those institutions.

"LLB" stands for Legum Baccalaureus in Latin. The "LL." of the abbreviation for the degree is from the genitive plural legum ("of laws"). Creating an abbreviation for a plural, especially from Latin, is often done by doubling the first letter (e.g., "pp." for "pages").

The bachelor's degree originated at the University of Paris, whose system was implemented with the Bachelor of Arts degree at Oxford and Cambridge. The "arts" designation of the degree traditionally signifies that the student has undertaken a certain amount of study of the classics. In continental Europe, the bachelor's degree was phased out in the 18th or early 19th century but it continued at Oxford and Cambridge.

The teaching of law at Oxford University was for philosophical or scholarly purposes and not meant to prepare one to practise law. Professional training for practising common law in England was undertaken at the Inns of Court, but over time the training functions of the Inns lessened considerably and apprenticeships with individual practitioners arose as the prominent medium of preparation. However, because of the lack of standardisation of study and of objective standards for appraisal of these apprenticeships, the role of universities became subsequently of importance for the education of lawyers in the English speaking world.

In England in 1292, when Edward I requested that lawyers be trained, students merely sat in the courts and observed, but over time the students would hire professionals to lecture them in their residences, which led to the institution of the Inns of Court system. The original method of education at the Inns of Court was a mix of moot court-like practice and lecture, as well as court proceedings observation. By the seventeenth century, the Inns obtained a status as a kind of university akin to the University of Oxford and the University of Cambridge, though very specialised in purpose. With the frequent absence of parties to suits during the Crusades, the importance of the lawyer role grew tremendously, and the demand for lawyers grew.

Traditionally Oxford and Cambridge did not see common law as worthy of study, and included coursework in law only in the context of canon and civil law and for the purpose of the study of philosophy or history only. The apprenticeship programme for solicitors thus emerged, structured and governed by the same rules as the apprenticeship programmes for the trades. The training of solicitors by apprenticeship was formally established by an act of parliament in 1729. William Blackstone became the first lecturer in English common law at the University of Oxford in 1753, but the university did not establish the programme for the purpose of professional study, and the lectures were philosophical and theoretical in nature. Blackstone insisted that the study of law should be university based, where concentration on foundational principles can be had, instead of concentration on detail and procedure had through apprenticeship and the Inns of Court.

The Inns of Court continued but became less effective, and admission to the bar still did not require any significant educational activity or examination. Therefore, in 1846, Parliament examined the education and training of prospective barristers and found the system to be inferior to the legal education provided in the United States. Therefore, formal schools of law were called for, but not finally established until later in the century, and even then the bar did not consider a university degree in admission decisions. When law degrees were required by the English bar and bar associations in other common law countries, the LLB became the uniform degree for lawyers in common law countries.

== Common law programs ==
In most common law countries (with the exceptions of all Canadian provinces except Quebec, and the United States), the Bachelor of Laws programme is generally entered directly after completion of secondary school.

=== England and Wales ===
The LLB is an undergraduate course. In England and Wales it is also possible to study a programme for conversion called the Graduate Diploma in Law which allows entry to the legal profession following completion of a previous undergraduate degree unrelated to law, which entitles graduates to take the vocational courses for entry into the legal profession.

=== Scotland ===
Although Scotland has a mixed legal system, with both Roman and common law elements, the undergraduate LLB is the primary route into the legal profession. The Scots Law LLB is generally taken as a four-year honours course, similar to other university degrees in Scotland. Students wishing to satisfy the Law Society of Scotland requirements to become a solicitor must also complete the postgraduate Diploma in Professional Legal Practice at an approved university.

=== Australia ===
A qualifying law degree for the purposes of admission as a lawyer in Australia is either the undergraduate LLB program at accredited universities, or the graduate JD (Juris Doctor). Every recognised qualification of each state admission board is reciprocally recognised by all other states. However, prior to degrees, there existed an alternative to a degree to become a lawyer in Australia, which was either the Barrister's Admission Board, or the Solicitor's Admission Board, whose examinations rendered one eligible to be admitted respectively. The successor of these boards that still operates the alternative is the Legal Profession Admission Board, which issues the distinct Diploma in Law, equivalent to either an LLB or a JD Law degrees typically last 4 years for undergraduate admission or 3 years for university graduates.

Of the thirty-eight law schools, thirteen of those universities have also started offering the Juris Doctor as a graduate-entry degree.

=== Bangladesh ===
In Bangladesh, obtaining an LLB degree is a prerequisite for practising as an advocate in a court of law. Both LLB and LLB (Hons.) degrees are offered at public and private universities. Only seven public universities offer LLB (Hons.) degree. Some private universities also offer four-year LLB (Hons.) degrees and one-year LLM courses. The National University of Bangladesh also offers a two-year LLB degree to graduates of subjects other than law. The University of Rajshahi is the first institute in South Asia to offer a bachelor's degree in law, originally offering the B. Jur. (Bachelor of Jurisprudence) beginning in 1970. Later on, the program was replaced with an LL. B (Hons.) program.

=== Canada ===
Canada has two legal systems. The Province of Quebec uses a civil law system. At the federal level, as well as in every province or territory except Quebec, a system of common law is used. Because of this, there are two types of Canadian law degrees generally in use.

==== Common law ====
The programme of study for common law has traditionally been an undergraduate LLB degree, which has now been re-designated as a JD at nearly all Canadian common law schools. Entrants to the JD programme generally hold an undergraduate degree before registration in the law programme and a significant number hold a graduate-level degree as well. However, admission may be granted to applicants with two years of undergraduate studies towards a degree. Unlike the United States, the JD is considered a bachelor's degree-level qualification, albeit a "second-entry" one. The common law programme is three years in length. Upon graduation, one holds a Bachelor of Laws or Juris Doctor degree. To practise law, the graduate must obtain a licence from the Law Society of the province where they wish to practise law, which requires a year of articling.

==== Civil law ====
The civil law programme in Canada is three years in length. The programme of study for the first degree in Quebec civil law (called LLB, BCL, or LLL) is a first-entry degree programme. Like other first-entry university programmes in Quebec, it requires a college diploma for entry. Law schools that offer civil law BCL, LLB, or LLL degrees include McGill University, Université de Montréal, Université du Québec à Montréal, Université de Sherbrooke, Université Laval and the University of Ottawa.

==== Bijuridical ====
Because of Canada's dual system of laws, some law schools offer joint or dual degrees in common law and civil law: McGill University, Université de Montréal, Université de Sherbrooke and the University of Ottawa. The law degree offered by McGill University is a mandatory joint common law LLB and Quebec civil law BCL degree. The programme is four years in length. Admission to that programme is a first-entry programme in the case of Quebec students while it is a second-entry programme in the case of students from other provinces (since two years of university studies is required). The University of Ottawa offers a civil law degree (LLL) on its own.

A number of Canadian law schools allow holders of baccalaureate degrees in Quebec civil law to earn the LLB in common law in two or three semesters. Similarly, the University of Ottawa offers a one-year LLL programme in Quebec civil law for holders of an LLB or JD degree in common law from a Canadian law school.

Additionally, some Canadian universities with common law law schools have an arrangement with a Canadian university with a Quebec civil law law school enabling students to obtain the home school's law degree in three years and the exchange school's law degree in the fourth year.

=== India ===
In India, legal education is traditionally offered as a three-year graduate degree conferring the title of Bachelor of Laws, requiring prospective students to have a bachelor's degree in any subject from a recognised institution.

However, specialised universities of law known as National Law Universities solely devoted to legal education offer an undergraduate five-year law course for students that have completed Class XII from a recognised board of education in India. The five-year law course leads to an integrated honours degree combining the LLB degree with another bachelor's degree, such as a Bachelor of Arts, Bachelor of Science, Bachelor of Business Administration, Bachelor of Commerce and Bachelor of Social Work. In these programs, students are taught subjects associated with the additional non-law bachelor's degree during the first two years, in addition to standard legal subjects such as torts, contracts and constitutional law, such as social sciences for the Bachelor of Arts and a combination of physical, life and applied sciences for the Bachelor of Science. In the latter three years of all these programmes, legal subjects dominate the curriculum.

The first national law school was the National Law School of India University. This was followed by others, including the Nalsar University of Law and West Bengal National University of Juridical Sciences. Today, many Indian universities offer five-year integrated BA LLB programmes similar to that of the national law schools of India, while others continue to offer a traditional three-year programme. Both integrated and traditional types of three-year law degrees are recognised by the Bar Council of India for to qualify for enrolment to the Bar. One needs to have a full-time law degree to practice as a lawyer in India. Distance or online education options are not available to become a practising lawyer in India.

=== Malaysia ===
Malaysia inherited a common law system from the British colonial period. However, unlike the United Kingdom and some other Commonwealth countries, Malaysia adopted the fused legal profession with legal practitioners acting both as solicitors and in a way "barristers". Hence all are lawyers eligible and can be admitted to the High Court as a legal professional is entitled to be bestowed with the title "Advocate & Solicitor". This applies to both lawyers practising in the Peninsular Malaysia (Malaya) and the States of Sabah & Sarawak.

Under the Legal Profession Act 1976, a person is deemed to be a qualified person to be admitted as an Advocate & Solicitor if they completed and passed the course of Bar Vocational Course in UK & Wales from any Inns of Court, passed the Certificate in Legal Practice or completed a 4-year LLB (Honours) course from an accredited Malaysian university.

=== New Zealand ===
An LLB is required to practise law in New Zealand. An LLB typically takes four years to complete, although it is often completed concurrently with another degree, such as a Bachelor of Commerce (BCom) or Bachelor of Arts (BA), with the combined completion time usually being five years. Most New Zealand universities allow graduates of other degrees to complete an LLB in three years. Six New Zealand universities offer the LLB degree.

=== Pakistan ===
Pakistan is a common law country and to become a lawyer in Pakistan, one needs an LLB from a Pakistani or a foreign university from common law country recognised by the Pakistan Bar Council. Lawyers in Pakistan are called advocates. An advocate has to be member of one of the provincial Bar Councils, i.e., Punjab Bar Council, Sindh Bar Council, Khyber Pakhtunkhwa Bar Council, Balochistan Bar Council or the Islamabad Bar Council.

The Bachelor of Laws obtained from universities in Pakistan consists of a 5-year BA-LLB qualification. This rule was laid down by the Pakistan Bar Council in 2016 requiring 5 years of education to obtain a Bachelor of Laws qualification. This change in the legal education rules led to the abolishing of 3 year LLB programs being offered by universities in Pakistan. This rule however does not affect the recognition of LLB degrees of less than 5 years obtained from foreign universities recognised by the Pakistan Bar Council for the purposes of enrolling as an advocate in Pakistan.

=== Singapore ===
In Singapore, the LLB is an undergraduate degree conferred by three universities: the National University of Singapore (NUS), the Singapore Management University (SMU), and the Singapore University of Social Sciences (SUSS). Graduate JD courses are also available at all three law schools. To be called to the Singapore Bar, graduates are minimally required to possess an LLB or JD from a recognised university.

=== South Africa ===
University of Pretoria Faculty of Law

In South Africa the LLB is offered both at the undergraduate and postgraduate levels. As of 1996 it is the universal and only legal qualification for legal practice, superseding the existing B.Juris. and B.Proc. degrees. The undergraduate programme, offered since 1998, requires four years of study. At the postgraduate level, the programme generally requires three years. Several South African universities offer Bachelor of Arts and Bachelor of Commerce degrees with a major in "Law"; graduates may then undertake a two-year postgraduate-programme. Some universities also offer a one-year programme for holders of the B.Proc. degree.

The curriculum is typically structured around preliminary, core and advanced courses, and most universities also offer elective coursework. The preliminary courses acquaint the students with both the background and the foundations of the South African legal system, and with legal thinking and analysis in general. The core subjects are those regularly required for legal practice. The advanced courses (usually) comprise further study in these core subjects, deepening and / or broadening the student's knowledge as appropriate. The electives – often comprising these advanced courses, amongst others – allow students to specialise in a particular area of law, to an extent, by choosing from a range of optional courses. Some universities also require that students complete an experience based course ("Practical Legal Studies" / "Law clinic"); a credit comprising independent research exclusively is often offered as an elective, and at some universities is a degree requirement.

Depending on university, the curriculum will comprise legal subjects exclusively, or may include humanities subjects so as to prepare graduates with a "broad-based" legal education. Some undergraduate programmes do not offer any optional coursework. Credits in English and Afrikaans are also often included. Along with Latin, these were, but are no longer, "subjects compelled by statute", and were typically entrance requirements for the LLB, having been studied as undergraduate modules. Similarly, Roman Law was previously a preliminary course, whereas, in both the post- and undergraduate degree, it is now offered as an elective.

The structure of the undergraduate programme is under review. The issues noted are: graduates of these programmes are seen to be less prepared for the profession as compared to those pursuing the graduate LLB; only 20% of entrants complete the programme within four years; only about 50% of graduates here enter the legal profession at all. Further, there are those who question the academic standard of the new degree. Some universities have now discontinued the programme; in other cases undergraduate students are required to initially register as Arts, Commerce or Science students – with first year law subjects – and, in the second year of study, only those meeting specified criteria may choose to pursue the four-year LLB.

== Alternative titles and formats ==
=== Irish BCL and LLB ===
The four universities under the National University of Ireland umbrella, award the degree of Bachelor of Civil Law (BCL). Four Irish universities and two Northern Irish universities award an LLB NUIG offer the LLB as a 1-year postgraduate course for holders of the Bachelor of Corporate Law or Bachelor of Arts in law degrees.

Some English and Welsh universities award an LLB in Irish law.

In the nineteenth century, the University of London conferred degrees of LLB on clerical and lay students at St. Patrick's College, Carlow from 1840 onwards.

The King's Inns Barrister-at-Law degree B.L. is a postgraduate degree and is required to practice as a barrister in Ireland.

=== Zimbabwe B.L. and LLB ===
At the University of Zimbabwe, the first degree in common law was the Bachelor of Laws (BL), which was equivalent to the LLB in other common law jurisdictions. It was followed by a one-year programme at the university (analogous to post-LLB vocational programmes in other common law jurisdictions) at the end of which a second degree, the Bachelor of Laws (LLB), was awarded. The curriculum has since been changed and now only one four-year honours LLB degree is awarded.

=== Variations on the LLB ===
Some universities in the United Kingdom and New Zealand offer variations, which generally take four years to complete and include a wider range of topics as well as some degree of specialisation or the study of multiple jurisdictions, such as the LLB Law with French Law and Language offered by the University of East Anglia.

Various universities in the United Kingdom and Australia will allow a degree that combines study with a non-law discipline. For example, some universities in the United Kingdom offer a combined study of law and history leading to a BA degree that is accepted by the Law Society and Inns of Court as equivalent to an LLB.

The University of London External Programme in Laws (LLB) has been awarding its law degree via distance learning since 1858.

At the universities of Oxford and Cambridge, the principal law degree remains the Bachelor of Arts, in either Jurisprudence or Law, which is equivalent to an LLB in other universities. Traditionally, the LLB at Cambridge, as well as the Bachelor of Civil Law at Oxford, were postgraduate degrees for specialising in law. The University of Cambridge, recently, replaced their LLB title with that of the LLM, which Oxford retains the BCL as a master's level course, equivalent to the LLM.

Some universities in the UK including Bournemouth University have a four-year LLB course, which consists of a 40-week industrial work placement. Staffordshire University also offers a two-year full-time LLB course.

LLB programs in syaria and common law have been introduced by some universities in Pakistan and Malaysia.

== United States ==
The United States no longer offers the LLB, though some universities have introduced bachelor's degrees in legal studies, featuring curricula that include courses in constitutional law, tort law, and criminal law. These degrees may provide an accelerated pathway into the JD program, allowing students to complete both degrees in six instead of seven years.

While the LLB was conferred until 1971 at Yale University, since that time, universities in the United States have instead awarded the professional doctorate JD, which then became the generally standardised degree in most states as the compulsory prerequisite to sit for the bar exam prior to practice of law. Many law schools converted their basic law degree programmes from LLB to JD in the 1960s, and permitted prior LLB graduates to retroactively receive the new doctorate degrees by returning their LLB in exchange for a JD degree. Yale graduates who received LLB degrees prior to 1971 were similarly permitted to change their degree to a JD, though many did not take the option, choosing to retain their LLB degrees.

Before the degree was phased out, notable recipients of the LLB include former United States presidents Richard Nixon, Gerald Ford, and William Howard Taft; former United States Supreme Court Justices Earl Warren, Anthony Kennedy, William Rehnquist, Antonin Scalia, Ruth Bader Ginsburg, Thurgood Marshall, Sandra Day O'Connor and Stephen Breyer; former FBI director J. Edgar Hoover; American judge and jurist Richard Allen Posner; as well as the first female commissioner of the Federal Communications Commission, Frieda B. Hennock.

=== Eligibility of foreign graduates in the US ===
The requirements of each of the states vary, and in some states sufficient years of practice in one's home country may allow for those otherwise excluded to sit for the bar exam.

Most states require completion of a law degree from a law school accredited by the American Bar Association. As a result, some American law schools offer one-year LLM programmes for foreign attorneys, which qualify foreign lawyers for admission to some state bars.

== European LLB programs ==
European Union law permits European Union citizens with LLB degrees from one EU member state, who practise law and have been qualified lawyers in their jurisdiction for three or more years, to practise also in every other member state. The actual procedure to receive the respective national licence is regulated by the member state and therefore differs from country to country, and temporary restrictions may in certain cases exist, but every EU member has to apply the relevant EU Directives to its own national law.

As a consequence of the Bologna Process, recently many universities of applied sciences and a few traditional universities in Germany have introduced LLB programmes, replacing the Diplom-Wirtschaftsjurist degree. The LLB is a three or four-year full-time law degree. As opposed to courses of study leading to the State Examination—the master's-level professional law degree in Germany—most LLB degree programmes concentrate on private law and may feature a component of education in business administration. Graduates of LLB courses can continue LLM studies and in some cases sit for the first State Examination after one or more years of additional law studies in order to qualify for practising law in Germany.

In Malta, the Bachelor of Laws (LLB) degree, offered by the University of Malta, is an undergraduate degree that of itself is not sufficient for admission into any of the legal professions. Likewise, in Italy a five-year course in law (Laurea magistrale in giurisprudenza a ciclo unico) is offered by law schools. The Italian Diploma in Law, equivalent to the LLB, does not directly qualify one for a career in any legal profession, as graduates are required to undergo a traineeship for 18 months before taking a government exam to sit for the Italian bar or take the exam as public notary. Alternatively, this requirement can be met by undertaking two further year of studies (Diploma di specializzazione per le professioni legali – equivalent of a 2-year Master of Arts).

In Spain, there is no comparable degree to the LLB Law studies in Spain last for four years in total, culminating in the "Grado en Derecho". Prior to that, the sole degree of "Licenciatura en Derecho" allowed graduates of law direct access to the legal profession without further training and masters. Currently, holders of a Spanish law degree must attend a specific LLM in Legal practice course (similar to the former British LPC) to gain admission to the Spanish bar.

In Denmark, universities now offer three-year LLB programmes, although this is not sufficient to practice law. Students wishing to practice law should continue with a Masters in Law programme, leading to the cand.jur. degree. Alternatively, students may choose to use the LLB as a basis for other courses within the social sciences or humanities.

== See also ==
- Admission to the bar
- Admission to the bar in the United States
- Call to the bar
- Doctor of Juridical Science
- Doctor of Law
- Juris Doctor
- Legal education
- Licence de droit
- Lists of law schools
- Master of Laws

== Sources ==
- Reed, Alfred Zantzinger (1921). Training for the public profession of the law: Historical development and principal contemporary problems of legal education in the United States, with some account of conditions in England and Canada. New York: Carnegie Foundation. OCLC 60738310.
- Stein, Ralph Michael (1981). "The Path of Legal Education from Edward I to Langdell: A History of Insular Reaction". Chicago-Kent Law Review. 57 (2): 429–454. OCLC 8092906761.
