= Financial secretary (disambiguation) =

Financial secretary is a governmental position used in some jurisdictions.

It may also refer to:

- Financial Secretary to the Treasury
- Financial Secretary (Hong Kong)
- Financial Secretary of Ceylon
- Financial Secretary to the War Office
- Financial secretary of the Falkland Islands
- Financial Secretary to the King
- Financial Secretary to the Admiralty

== See also ==
- Finance secretary (disambiguation)
- Cabinet Secretary for Finance (disambiguation)
