= Cabinet Secretary for Finance =

Cabinet Secretary for Finance may refer to:

- Cabinet Secretary for Finance (Wales), a Welsh Government position
- Cabinet Secretary for Finance and Local Government, a Scottish Government position

== See also ==
- Finance secretary (disambiguation)
- Financial secretary (disambiguation)
