= Lahore Bar Association =

- Type: Working Underneath (Punjab Bar Council)
- Purpose: Bar association
- Headquarters: Lahore, Pakistan
- Region served: Lahore, Pakistan
- Official language: English
- President: Irfan Hayat Bajwa
- General Secretary: Malik Fahad Nisar Khokar
- Website: lahorebarassociation.org

The Lahore Bar Association is a professional organization of lawyers in Lahore, Pakistan. Its members have historically played a major role in the Pakistani independence movement. It is the biggest Bar in Asia.

The association's incumbent President is Irfan Hayat Bajwa, a senior advocate of the Supreme Court of Pakistan. He is affiliated with Professional Group of lawyers which is headed by Senator Hamid Khan.

== Notable former presidents ==
- Manzoor Qadir
- Abid Hassan Minto
- Khawaja Muhammad Sharif
- Hafiz Abdul Rehman Ansari
- Mian Abdul Quddus
- Malik Mohammad Qayyum
- Nusrat Javed Bajwa
- Chaudhry Ishtiaq Ahmad
- Chaudhry Zulfiqar Ali
- Rana Zia Abdul Rahman
- Chaudhry Ishtiaq Ahmad Khan
- Rao Muhammad Sami
- Rana Intizar Hussain
- Mubashir Rehman Chaudhry
- Irfan Hayat Bajwa

== Notable former secretaries ==
- Manzur Qadir
- A Kareem Malik
- Akram Sheikh
- Ashraf Wahla
- Khawaja Sultan
- Nusrat Javed Bajwa
- Chaudhry Ishtiaq Ahmad
- Chaudhry Zulfiqar Ali
- Rana Zia Abdul Rahman
- Maqsood Buttar
- Tahir Nasrullah Warraich
- Sultan Hasan Malik
- Malik Sohail Murshad
- Rana Sufyan Arshad
- Rehan Ahmad Khan
- Malik Fahad Nisar Khokar

== See also ==
- Pakistan Bar Council
- Punjab Bar Council
- Sindh Bar Council
- Balochistan Bar Council
- Khyber Pakhtunkhwa Bar Council
- Islamabad Bar Council
- Supreme Court Bar Association of Pakistan
- Lahore High Court Bar Association
