= Asif Ali Malik =

Pakistani politician and lawyer

Parliamentary Secretary for Housing, Urban Development and Public Health Engineering, Punjab
- In office 13 October 1997 – 12 October 1999

Member of the Provincial Assembly of the Punjab
- In office 1997–2001

Vice Chairman, Punjab Bar Council
- In office 2009–2010

Personal details
- Born: Attock, Pakistan
- Party: PML-N

Asif Ali Malik (born June 8, 1948) is a Pakistani former politician and lawyer. He served as a Provincial Parliamentary Secretary for Housing between 1997 and 1999, as a Member of the Provincial Assembly of the Punjab between 1997 and 2001 and as Vice Chairman of the Punjab Bar Council between 2009 and 2010.

== Early life and education ==
Asif Ali Malik was born Dhallian, District Attock on June 8, 1948. He graduated with a Bachelor of Laws from the Punjab University Law College, Lahore.

== Career ==
Malik practiced as an advocate.

In 1979 he also became involved in locals politics as secretary of the Pakistan Muslim League for Attock for twelve years. In 1997, he was to the Provincial Assembly of the Punjab. That year he was also appointed Parliamentary Secretary for Housing, Urban Development and Public Health Engineering.

He was elected as the Vice-chairman Punjab Bar Council in 2009.

== Personal life ==
Asif Ali Malk is married to the sister of former leader of the Opposition in the National Assembly Chaudhry Nisar Ali Khan. He has two sons and two daughters.
