= Khalid Ranjha =

Pakistani lawyer and a politician

- Occupations: Lawyer; politician
- Known for: Law Minister of Pakistan; A member of Senate of Pakistan

Supreme Court of Pakistan

Khalid Ranjha is a Pakistani lawyer and a politician from Punjab, Pakistan. He also served as Federal Law Minister of Pakistan and a member of the Senate of Pakistan. He remained Advocate General Punjab, Judge Lahore High Court and the President of Lahore High Court Bar Association, Lahore.

== Educational background ==
Khalid Ranjha studied at St. Anthony's High School, Government College University, Lahore, Punjab University Law College and at the University of London, where he received his PhD degree, eventually becoming a Research Fellow at the Institute of Advanced Legal Studies, University of London.

== Political career ==
He is a former senator for Punjab and was affiliated with Pakistan Muslim League (Q). He was also affiliated with Standing Committee on Law, Justice, Human Rights and Parliamentary Affairs. He also served as Law Minister in the federal cabinet of General Pervez Musharraf in 2002.

== Positions held ==
- Member Punjab Bar Council
- Vice-Chairman, Punjab Bar Council
- President, Lahore High Court Bar Association
- Advocate General Punjab
- Judge, Lahore High Court
- Law Minister, Minorities Affairs, Government of Punjab, Pakistan
- Federal law minister, Government of Pakistan in 2002
- Rector, Institute of Management Sciences (Lahore)
