= Institute of Management Sciences (Lahore) =

Institute of Management Sciences, Lahore
- Pak-AIMS
- Seal of IMS, Lahore
- Type: Private
- Established: 1987
- Affiliations: Higher Education Commission
- Chairman: Khalid Ranjha
- Chancellor: Governor of Punjab, Pakistan
- Faculty: 110
- Students: 1400
- Location: Lahore, Punjab, Pakistan
- Campus: Urban
- Website: pakaims.edu.pk

The Institute of Management Sciences (IMS Lahore), formerly known as Pak-American Institute of Management Sciences (Pak-AIMS), is a project of AKEF (Al Karim Educational Foundation) established in Lahore, Pakistan in 1987 which offers undergraduate and graduate programs in management and computer sciences.

The Rector of the institute is Khalid Ranjha in 2014. It is located in Gulberg, Lahore.

Pak-AIMS was issued 'No Objections Certificate (NOC)' by the University Grants Commission, now known as the Higher Education Commission (Pakistan) for the award of charter in 1995. Consequently, the institute was chartered as Institute of Management Sciences (IMS) by the Government of Punjab (Pakistan) under the Punjab Ordinance XXIII of 2002 and given degree-awarding status.

== Government-recognized institution ==
Institute of Management Sciences has 1,400 students and 110 faculty members, who teach 170 courses in trimesters. This institute is officially accredited and recognized by the Higher Education Commission of Pakistan.

== Introduction and history ==
The institute was established in Lahore in 1986 as the Canadian School of Management - Lahore Learning Center. Later the name was changed to The Pak-American Institute of Management Sciences (Pak-AIMS) to reflect the institute's Articulation Agreement with the College of Staten Island of City University of New York (CSI/CUNY), USA.

== Campuses ==
- Main campus, Gulberg III, Lahore, Pakistan.

== Departments ==
- Department of Computer Science
- Department of Management Sciences
- Department of Law
- Department of Physics
- Department of English literature
- Department of Mathematics

== Bachelor's degrees offered ==
- bachelor's in Computer Sciences
- Bachelor of Business Administration
- Bachelor of Information Technology
- bachelor's in Computer Engineering
- bachelor's in Software Engineering

== Master's degrees offered ==
- Master of Business Administration
- master's in Computer Sciences
- Master of Business Administration (Executive)
- master's in History

== Notable faculty ==
- Khalid Ranjha
