= Kamran Murtaza =

Pakistani politician

Member of the Senate of Pakistan
- Incumbent
- Assumed office March 2021
- Constituency: Balochistan

16th President, Supreme Court Bar Association of Pakistan
- In office 2013–2014

Personal details
- Party: JUI (F) (2021-present)

Kamran Murtaza is a Pakistani politician and a Senior Advocate at the Supreme Court of Pakistan. He is currently serving as Senator of Pakistan from Balochistan Province for the term 2021 - 2027. He also remained in office as a Senator from 2003-2009. His political affiliation is with (MMA) Jamiat Ulema-e-Islam (F). He is the founder of Kamran Law Associates.

He was granted status of the 'Senior Advocate of the Supreme Court of Pakistan' on merit in note of his contributions as a lawyer. He holds 126 Reported Judgments to his name and contributed to 390 unprecedented legal issues in his career. He has also served in following notable legal positions:

- The 59th Vice-Chairman Pakistan Bar Council (2018-2019)
- Member Pakistan Bar council (2016-2021)
- 16th President Supreme Court Bar Association of Pakistan (2013-2014)
- Ex-Vice Chairman Balochistan Bar Council
- Former Member Judicial Commission
- Honorary Vice-Chancellor of various Universities.
