= Finance secretary =

Finance secretary may refer to:

- Finance Secretary (India)
- Finance Secretary (Pakistan)

== See also ==
- Cabinet Secretary for Finance (disambiguation)
- Financial secretary (disambiguation)
