= Munir A. Malik =

Pakistani lawyer

Munir A. Malik (sometimes spelled Muneer) is a Pakistani lawyer who has served as the 30th Attorney General of Pakistan. He was a key leader of the Lawyers' Movement in Pakistan. He is a former President of the Supreme Court Bar Association of Pakistan. He was the leader of the legal defence team of Chief Justice Iftikhar Muhammad Chaudhry when he was dismissed by General Pervez Musharraf in 2007.

== Arrest ==
Malik was arrested after Musharraf declared a state of emergency. He was initially admitted at Pakistan Institute of Medical Sciences on 25 November 2007, seriously ill and under treatment for kidney failure requiring dialysis. He was transferred to Sindh Institute of Urology and Transplantation in Karachi, where he still requires renal replacement therapy in the form of hemodialysis. Some reports indicate that he has developed liver dysfunction also. He complained about psychological abuse during detention.

Imran Khan has expressed concern about Malik's health and has blamed the government. He has criticized government to deny him of access to clean drinking water when he was under arrest in Attock jail. However, the doctors at the Pakistan Institute of Sciences (PIMS) conducted a toxicology screen and ruled out any foul play. Munir Malik has not pursued any charges against an individual or the Pakistani government and neither has sought an independent medical opinion.

== Role in reinstatement of Chief Justice Iftikhar Muhammad Chaudhry ==
After the suspension and arrest of Iftikhar Chaudhry on 9 March 2007, Muneer Malik was one of the first people to contact him and assure the unconditional support of lawyers. The same day, Malik declared, "This is a callous conspiracy of the highest order against superior judiciary ."

For his role in the lawyers' movement he has been decorated with a number of awards, including the Dorab Patel Rule of Law Award conferred by the Human Rights Commission of Pakistan, the Human Rights Defender Award of the Asian Human Rights Commission that he shared with successor as President SCBA, Aitzaz Ahsan and the 2008 Gwangju Prize for Human Rights.

== Attempt on his life ==
On 10 May 2007, Muneer A. Malik was watching TV at 3:00 am at his home in DHA when he heard bullets being fired that hit the upper portion of his house where his son and other family members were present. Windows of his house were broken and bullets signs were present outside the wall of his house as well as inside the home. His daughter and his family members remained safe.
