= Qazi Anwar =

Pakistani politician and lawyer

Qazi Anwar or Qazi Muhammad Anwar (Urdu: قاضی محمد انور) is a former attorney general, constitutional lawyer, president of the Supreme Court Bar Association of Pakistan (SCBAP) and former senator. A former activist in the Pakistan Peoples Party, he joined the Awami National Party (ANP) in 1994 in protest against the dismissal of the provincial government by the federal government. He also served as additional deputy secretary general of ANP.

Qazi Anwar was active in opposing the suspension of Supreme Court Chief Justice Iftikhar Chaudhry.

A Pashto & Hindko-speaker, he rejoined the Awami National Party. He was elected as president of SCBAP in 2009, defeating Barrister Bacha with support from lawyers associated with the ANP and PPP.

Qazi Anwar, after his election to the office as SCBAP president, took a hard line on the issue of the independence of the judiciary from interference by the government. He took an equally hard line against government influence on the SCBA, returning a 1 million rupee cheque to then-law minister Babar Awan.
