= Akram Sheikh =

Pakistani lawyer

Attorney Akram Sheikh

Personal details
- Born: Burewala, Vehari District Pakistan
- Children: Raheel Kamran Sheikh & Sharjeel Akram Sheikh
- Profession: Lawyer, advisor & consultant

Supreme Court of Pakistan where office of Supreme Court Bar Association of Pakistan is situated

Muhammad Akram Sheikh (Urdu: محمد اکرم شیخ) is a Pakistani attorney in the Supreme Court of Pakistan. He remained member Pakistan Bar Council and President Supreme Court Bar Association of Pakistan. His two son are Advocate and member of Lahore High Court Bar Association. He also enjoyed the office of Ambassador -at-Large of Pakistan dully appointed by Prime Minister Nawaz Sharif. He was closely associated with Barrister Ijaz Husain Batalvi and his elder son Raheel Kamran Sheikh member Pakistan Bar Council also joined Ijaz Husain Batalvi Chamber where Akhtar Aly Kureshy Advocate was there to welcome him and now he has been elevated to the Judge of Lahore High Court, Lahore. He was appointed Public Prosecutor in General Pervez Musharraf High Treason case, a noval case in the history of Pakistan to uphold the supremacy of Constitution in which General Pervez Musharraf was sentenced to death, a new milestone.

== Early life and career ==
Muhammad Akram Sheikh was born near Burewala, Vehari District in Punjab, Pakistan. He received his education from Forman Christian College, Lahore. Then he finished his postgraduate studies at the University of Punjab, Lahore in 1972.

- He started his career from the District Bar Association, Sahiwal in 1973.
- He also became a lawyer of the Lahore High Court.
- He then served as Chairman Executive Committee (CEC) of Pakistan Bar Council (1993-1994).
- He also had served as President of Supreme Court Bar Association of Pakistan some years ago.

== Major court cases ==
Akram Sheikh has contested many major court cases including:

- In a much-publicized case in the recent past, Akram Sheikh represented a Pakistani-American Mansoor Ijaz who had alleged that the then Pakistani ambassador in the US Hussain Haqqani had written a memo to US authorities asking for American help against the intervention in politics by the Pakistani military. This memo had allegedly been written by Haqqani on the advice of then Pakistani President Asif Ali Zardari.
- Akram Sheikh has represented Nawaz Sharif and his family in many criminal and constitutional cases against them since the early 1990s.
- In 1988–89, Akram Sheikh successfully defended Punjab government's right to open up its own bank Bank of Punjab. At that time, there was a confrontation between Nawaz Sharif's Punjab government and the federal government of Benazir Bhutto.

== Notable news media appearances ==
- Akram Sheikh has been vocal on national and international forums for human rights, independence of judiciary and rule of law. For example, he participated in the 'Lawyers March for Law in Pakistan' on 14 November 2007 (news coverage of this march by US TV channel C-Span Network is shown on their website).

== See also ==
- Justice Raheel Kamran Sheikh
- Supreme Court Bar Association of Pakistan
- Pakistan Bar Council
