= Bar journal =

A bar journal is a trade magazine published by a bar association, a lawyers association.

== See also ==
- ABA Journal
- Law review
