= Muhammad Kazim Khan =

Pakistani politician

Senator Muhammad Kazim Khan محمد کاظم خان

Chairperson- Senate Committee on Law and Justice
- In office March 2009 – March 2015
- President: Mamnoon Hussain
- Prime Minister: Nawaz Sharif

Personal details
- Born: Muhammad Kazim Khan; 1 June 1947
- Died: 20 February 2017 (aged 69) Lahore
- Party: Pakistan Peoples Party
- Education: B.A. LLB
- Occupation: Politician

Muhammad Kazim Khan (Urdu: محمد کاظم خان) was a Pakistani Politician and Member of Senate of Pakistan, who served as Chairperson- Senate Committee on Law and Justice from 2009 to 2015.

== Political career ==
He belongs to Punjab province of Pakistan, and was elected to the Senate of Pakistan in March 2009 on a reserved seat of Technocrats & Ulema as Pakistan Peoples Party candidate. He was the chairperson of Senate Committee on Law and Justice and member of senate committees of Functional Committee on Government Assurances, National Food Security and Research, Federal Education and Professional Training and Select Committee. He was elected Vice-chairman Pakistan Bar Council in 2010.

== See also ==
- List of Senators of Pakistan
- List of committees of the Senate of Pakistan
