= Lahore High Court Bar Association =

Pakistani provincial lawyers organisation

- Founded: January 21, 1893; 133 years ago
- Purpose: Bar association
- Headquarters: Lahore, Pakistan
- Region served: Lahore, Pakistan
- Official language: English
- President: Rana Babar Murtaza Khan
- Vice President: Sohail Qaiser Tarar
- Secretary: Qasim Ijaz Summra
- Finance Secretary: Malik Ali Raza Khokhar
- Website: www.lhcbar.com//

The Lahore High Court Bar Association (Urdu: عدالتِ عالیہ لاہور مجلسِ وکلاء) is a professional association and representative body for lawyers who practice before the Lahore High Court in Lahore, in the Punjab province of Pakistan.

Lahore Bar (presently Lahore High Court Bar) was established as a collective group somewhere before 1892-93 and its first President was elected in 1893. In 1910 the Executive Committee recommended that the Bar Association should be registered accordingly. The General House accepted the recommendations on 9 June 1910 and registered it as a Bar Association.

== History ==
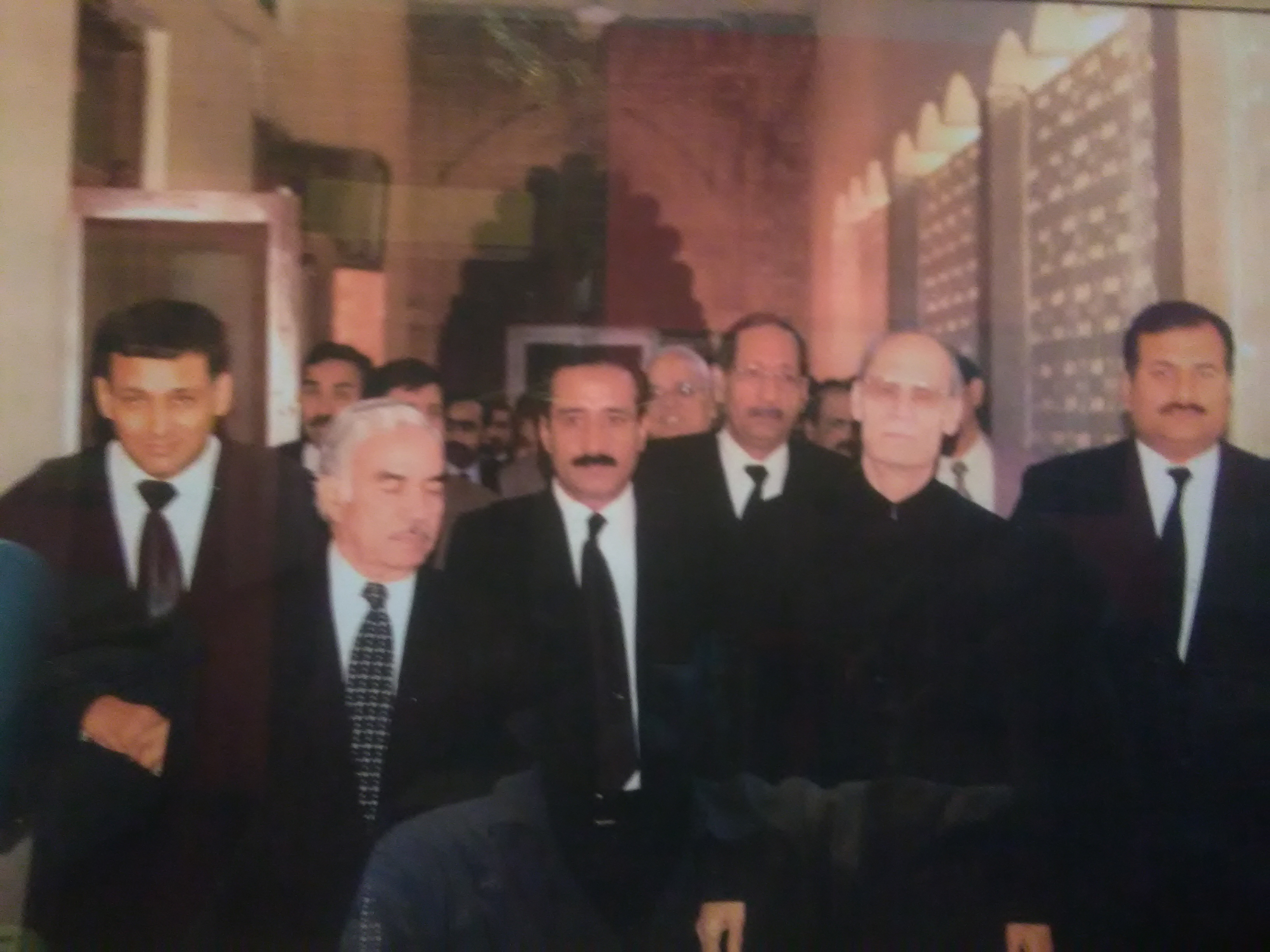
Left to right Akhtar Aly Kureshy Advocate, Asrar-ul-Haq Mian President of Lahore High Court Bar Association, Mr. Ahsan Bhoon, Chief Justice Pakistan Justice Muhammad Bashir Jehangiri, Rana Mashood Ahmad Khan Secretary Lahore High Court Bar Association.

The earliest trace of the Lahore High Court Bar as a body to be acknowledged and accepted starts from 1882. In October 1882, the judges of the Chief Court passed a resolution requesting Mr. C. H. Spitta, Barrister-at-Law (then a leading member of the legal fraternity and later to become a temporary judge of the Chief Court) to convene a Special Meeting of the Bar, to devise measures to root out touting. In compliance with this Resolution, Mr. C. H. Spitta convened a meeting of the Lahore Bar on 22 November 1882, in the Bar Room and at which five Barristers and thirteen Pleaders attended. The meeting was presided by Mr. C. H. Spitta. At the meeting, ten resolutions to root out touting were passed by the Lahore Bar and their copies transmitted to the Registrar of the Chief Court, for his attention. These were received and under the orders of the Judges, circulated by the Chief Court to all the Commissioners and Superintendents of the various Divisions for compliance. Apart from the above, there is no further evidence of the Lahore Bar till 1892–93. Out of the Association's available records, the register containing the Minutes of the earliest General Meetings of the Chief Court Bar Association starts from the year 1893. The file dealing with the subject "Touts-High Court" amongst the High Court's records, contains the copy of a letter addressed to the Secretary of the Bar Association in 1892 and his seems to be the earliest letter traceable from the various High Court files addressed to the legal fraternity practicing in the Chief court in its capacity as an Association. From these items of evidence, it can fairly be inferred that the Lahore Bar assumed some maturity by 1882 and became an entity which commanded attention and to which the Chief Court had to look to for assistance. But the Lahore Bar as a collective group or entity took birth somewhere after 1882 and before 1892–93.

In 1910 the executive committee recommended that the Chief Court Bar Association should be registered and that the Secretary should take necessary steps for this purpose. The General House in its meeting held on 9 June 1910, accepted the recommendations of the committee.

== Notable former presidents ==
- William Rattigan (1893)
- Mian Muhammad Shafi (1917)
- Khalifa Shuja ul Din (1948)
- Karam Elahi Chohan (1963)
- Miss Rabia Qari (1966)
- Dr Javaid Iqbal (1968)
- Manzoor Qadir (1974)
- Amir Raza Khan (1977)
- Abid Hassan Minto (1982)
- Syed Afzal Haider (1983)
- Karamat Nazir Bhandari (1989)
- Hamid Khan (1992)
- Khalid Ranjha (1996)
- Muhammad Kazim Khan (1998)
- Hafiz Abdul Rehman Ansari (2002)
- Ahmad Awais (2004)
- Fakhar-un-Nisa Khokar (2005)
- Nasira Iqbal (2008)
- Mian Abdul Quddus (2010)
- Shehram Sarwar Chaudhary (2012)
- Abid Saqi (2013)
- Shafaqt Mahmood Chohan (2014)
- Chaudhry Zulfiqar Ali (2016)
- Rana Zia Abdul Rahman (2017)
- Anwaar ul Haq Pannun (2018)
- Tahir Nasrullah Warraich (2020)
- Maqsood Buttar (2021)
- Rana Khadim Hussain Qaiser (2022)
- Chaudhry Ishtiaq Ahmad Khan (2023)
- Asad Manzoor Butt (2024)
- Malik Asif Nissoana (2025)
- Rana Babar Murtaza Khan (2026)

== Notable former secretaries ==
- Charles Arthur Turner (1893)
- Mian Shah Din (1896)
- Mian Muhammad Shafi (1898)
- Khushwant Singh (1945)
- Manzoor Qadir (1955)
- Syed Afzal Haider (1961)
- Raja Muhammad Anwar (1966)
- Rana Abdul Rahim (1968)
- Ch Muhammad Farooq (1970)
- Hamid Khan (1978)
- Wasi Zafar (1982)
- Sair Ali (1983)
- Ahmad Awais (1984)
- Ijaz Ahmed Chaudhry (1986)
- Saqib Nisar (1988)
- Hafiz Abdul Rehman Ansari (1992)
- Muhammad Aslam Zar (1994)
- Iqbal Hameedur Rehman (1998)
- Abid Saqi (2001)
- Rana Mashood Ahmad Khan (2003)
- Muzammil Akhtar Shabbir (2004)
- Azam Nazeer Tarar (2005)
- Shehram Sarwar Chaudhary (2006)
- Rana Babar Murtaza Khan (2010)
- Malik Arshad Awan (2011)
- Rana Asad Ullah Khan (2013)
- Muqtadir Akhtar Shabbir (2014)
- Hassan Iqbal Warraich (2018)
- Rai Usman Ahmad (2020)
- Sabahat Rizvi (2023)
- Qadir Bukhsh Chahal (2024)
- Farrukh Cheema (2025)
- Qasim Ijaz Summra (2026)

== See also ==
- Supreme Court Bar Association of Pakistan
- Pakistan Bar Council
- Punjab Bar Council
- Sindh Bar Council
- Balochistan Bar Council
- Khyber Pakhtunkhwa Bar Council
- Islamabad Bar Council
- Lahore Bar Association
