= Balochistan Bar Council =

Organisation

Balochistan Bar Association
- انجمن وکیل بلوچستان
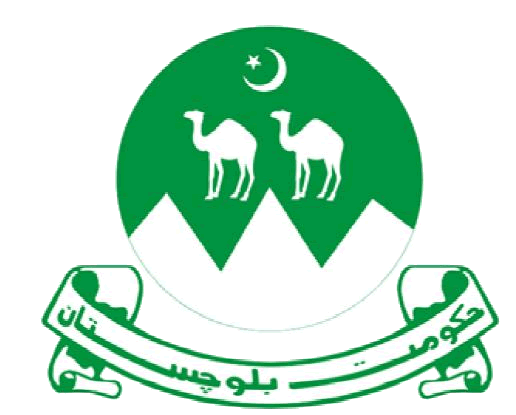
- Type: Public Body
- Purpose: Bar associations
- Headquarters: Quetta
- Region served: Balochistan, Pakistan
- Official language: English
- Website: bbcq.org.pk

The Balochistan Bar Council is a statutory & deliberative assembly of lawyers in Balochistan, Pakistan for safeguarding the rights, interests and privileges of practicing lawyers. The Council also regulates the conduct of lawyers and helps in the administration of justice. It has been constituted under Section 3(ii) of the Legal Practitioners and Bar Councils Act, 1973. All lower court and Balochistan High Court lawyers within Balochistan are licensed with this council.

== Composition ==
The Balochistan Bar Council consists of Chairman Executive Committee & Vice Chairman, both elected by Members of Balochistan Bar Council each year and these Members are elected by the advocates from different constituencies across the Balochistan Province. Members serve a term of five years, beginning on January 1, with elections held each November to fill seats of those whose terms will expire in the following January. The Advocate General of Balochistan acts as ex officio Chairman of Balochistan Bar Council.

== Targeted Killing ==
On 8 August 2016, the President of the Bar Association, Bilal Anwar Kasi, was assassinated on his way to the courthouse in Quetta. After his body was brought to the city's Government Hospital, a suicide bomber attacked the hospital. The attack killed more than 90 people, who were mostly legal colleagues from the Bar Association who had come to mourn Kasi's death. At least 50 people were injured as well.

== See also ==
- List of Pakistani Lawyers
- Pakistan Bar Council
- Supreme Court Bar Association of Pakistan
- Punjab Bar Council
- Lahore High Court Bar Association
- Sindh Bar Council
- Khyber Pakhtunkhwa Bar Council
- Lahore Bar Association
