= Pakistan Bar Council =

Regulating body of lawyers in Pakistan

پاکستان بار کونسل Pakistan Bar Council
- Established: 1973; 53 years ago
- Type: Bar Council/Bar Association, Regulating authority for lawyers Public Body with elected officer bearers
- Headquarters: Islamabad, Pakistan
- Region served: Pakistan
- Official language: English, Urdu
- Chairman: Attorney General for Pakistan
- Affiliations: Ministry of Law and Justice (Pakistan)
- Website: pakistanbarcouncil.org

Supreme Court of Pakistan, where the office of Pakistan Bar Council is situated

The Pakistan Bar Council (PBC) (Urdu: پاکستان بار کونسل) was established by the Parliament in 1973 under the Legal Practitioners and Bar Councils Act. It is the highest elected body Bar Council of lawyers in Pakistan.

Its 22 members are elected from across the country, with representation from each province. The members of the Pakistan Bar Council are elected on the basis of a single transferable vote by the members of the Provincial Bar Councils (i.e., Punjab Bar Council, Sindh Bar Council, Khyber Pakhtunkhwa Bar Council, Balochistan Bar Council and Islamabad Bar Council).

Pakistan Bar Council is a regulating authority for lawyers in Pakistan and is one of the accredited councils by the Higher Education Commission of Pakistan.

== Composition ==
The Pakistan Bar Council consists of Chairman Executive Committee, Vice Chairman and Members of Pakistan Bar Council elected by the Members of Provincial Bar Councils. Members serve a term of five years.

Attorney General for Pakistan acts as ex officio Chairman of Pakistan Bar Council. Role of Attorney General is only to act as returning officer of Pakistan Bar Council elections and to publish the gazette. Attorney General does not exercise power in matters relating to functions of the Bar Council.

=== Electoral Officers ===
- Chairman Executive: The chairman of the executive committee is Chief Executive of Bar Council and is elected by the members of the Council in each year. Chairman Executive Committee has full authority to decide matters of Bar Council in every aspect.
- Vice Chairman: Vice Chairman is figurehead of Bar Council and is elected by the members of the Council in January each year. Vice Chairman is ex officio Member of each Committee of Bar Council. However, the executive powers of Bar Council rest with Chairman Executive Committee.
- Members of Pakistan Bar Council are elected after 4 years for a duration of 5 years by Elected Representatives of Lawyers of Pakistani Provincial Bar Councils.

=== Permanent Officer ===
- Secretary: A full-time employee of Grade 21, responsible to perform duties enshrined under the Legal Practitioners and Bar Councils Act, 1973. Subject to the provisions of the act and the rules, the secretary shall act under the supervisory control of the Executive Committee of the Pakistan Bar Council.

== Function ==
- Only those advocates recognized by the Bar Council may represent clients in all the branches of the Supreme Court of Pakistan. Pakistan Bar council is ..."responsible for safeguarding rights, interests and privileges of practicing lawyers, regulating their conduct and helping in the administration of justice".

== List of Elected Leaders ==
Year	Chairman Executive	Vice Chairman
1993	Akram Sheikh	Raja Haq Nawaz Khan
1994	G. M. Qureshi	Muhammad Ashraf Wahlah
1995	Latif Khosa	Abdus Samad Dogar
1996	Mushtaq A. Memon	Hamid Khan
1997	Arif Hussain Khilji	Javaid A. Khan
1998	Muhammad Ashraf Wahlah	Muhammad Yousuf Leghari
1999	Muhammad Ashraf Wahlah	Muhammad Yousuf Leghari
2000	Abdul Hakeem Khan H. Bijarani	Ejaz Ahmed Rana
2001	Malik Rab Nawaz Noon	Muhammad Naeem Goreja
2002	Abdul Haleem Pirzada	Kadir Bakhsh Bhutto
2003	Muhammad Kazim Khan	Abdul Rahim Kazi
2004	Qazi Muhammad Jamil	H. Shakeel Ahmed
2005	Hamid Khan	Hafiz Abdul Rehman Ansari
2006	Syed Qalb-i-Hassan	Muhammad Azhar Chaudhry
2007	Qazi Anwar	Mirza Aziz Akbar Baig
2008	Rasheed A. Razvi	Haji Syed Rehman
2009	Muhammad Nasrullah Warraich	Abu’l Inam
2010	Haji Syed Rehman	Muhammad Kazim Khan
2011	Asrar-ul-Haq Mian	Latif Afridi
2012	Burhan Moazzam Malik	Akhtar Hussain
2013	Mian Abbas Ahmed	Syed Qalb-i-Hassan
2014	Abrar Hasan	Muhammad Ramzan Chaudhry
2015	Muhammad Ahsan Bhoon	Azam Nazeer Tarar
2016	Abdul Fayaz	Farogh Naseem
2017	Hafeez-ur-Rehman Chaudhry	Muhammad Ahsan Bhoon
2018	Kamran Murtaza	Ghulam Shabbir Shar Baloch
2019	Amjad Shah	Hafiz Idris Sheikh
2020	Abid Saqi	Sher Muhammad Khan
2021	Khush Dil Khan	Muhammad Fahim Wali
2022	Masood Chishti	Hafeez ul Rehman Chaudhry
2023	Hasan Raza Pasha	Haroon ur Rashid
2024	Farooq H. Naek	Riazat Ali Shar
2025	Tariq Afridi	Tahir Nasrullah Warraich
2026	Munir A. Malik	Masood Chishti

== See also ==
- Punjab Bar Council
- Sindh Bar Council
- Balochistan Bar Council
- Khyber Pakhtunkhwa Bar Council
- Supreme Court Bar Association of Pakistan
- Lahore High Court Bar Association
- Lahore Bar Association
