= Supreme Court Bar Association of Pakistan =

Bar Association

- Type: Working Under (Pakistan Bar Council)
- Purpose: Bar association
- Headquarters: Islamabad, Pakistan
- Region served: Pakistan
- Official language: English, Urdu
- President: Syed Amjad Shah
- Secretary: Muhammad Arif Awan
- Website: www.scbap.com

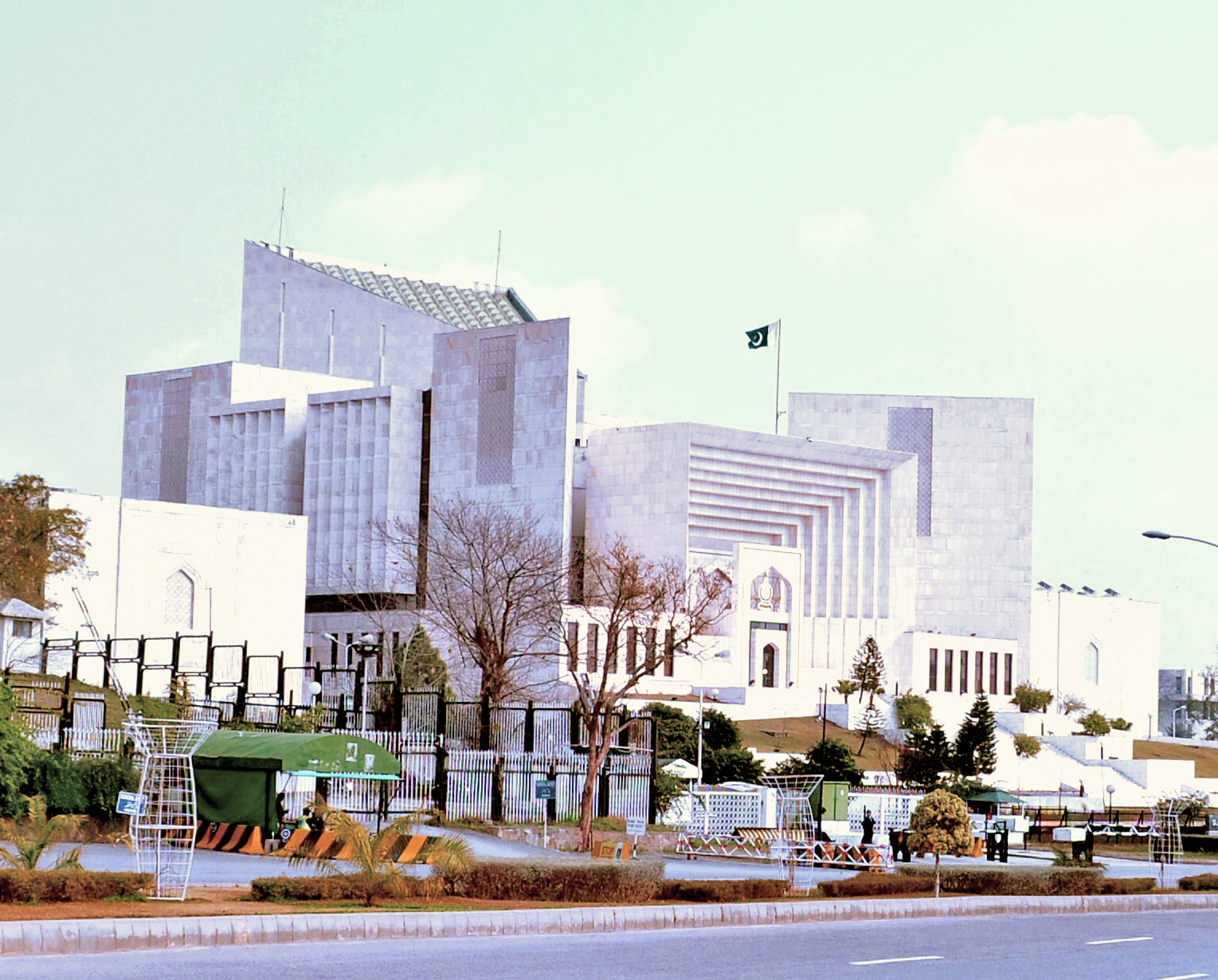
Supreme Court of Pakistan

The Supreme Court Bar Association (Urdu: عدالتِ عظمیٰ مجلسِ وکلاء; SCBAP) is an association established in 1989 comprising the Supreme Court lawyers in Pakistan. The Legal Practitioners and Bar Councils Act 1973 provides for the forming, recognition and functioning of Bar Associations for supreme court lawyers working under the control of Pakistan Bar Council. It is an independent Bar association whose aim is to uphold the rule of law and the cause of justice and protect and promote the interest of the legal profession as well as that of the public.

The Rules of the Supreme Court Bar Association of Pakistan, 1989 provide the detailed provisions for elections, meetings, its committees, disciplinary proceedings, powers and functions of the executive committee of the Bar Association etc. The SCBAP has 22 members, who are elected annually to manage the affairs and execute the functions of the SCBAP. The executive committee consisting of the President, Four Vice-Presidents (one from each Province), Secretary and Additional Secretary, Finance Secretary from Islamabad. Fourteen executive members elected from throughout Pakistan (at least two from each Province) by way of balloting.

== Notable former presidents ==
- Abid Hassan Minto
- Akram Sheikh
- Hamid Khan
- Justice Tariq Mahmood
- Malik Mohammad Qayyum
- Ali Ahmad Kurd
- Aitzaz Ahsan
- Munir A. Malik
- Qazi Anwar
- Asma Jahangir
- Kamran Murtaza
- Rasheed A Rizvi
- Syed Ali Zafar
- Amanullah Kanrani
- Latif Afridi
- Latif Khosa
- Abid Shahid Zuberi
- Shahzad Shoukat
- Haroon Ur Rasheed

== Notable former secretaries ==
- Akram Sheikh
- Hamid Khan
- Munir A. Malik
- Qazi Anwar
- Raja Javaid Iqbal
- Ali Akbar Qureshi
- Syed Zafar Ali Shah
- Qamar Zaman Qureshi
- Aftab Bajwa
- Aslam Zar
- Ameen Javaid
- Asad Manzoor Butt
- Azmat Ullah Chaudhry
- Shamim ur Rahman Malik
- Ahmad Shahzad Farooq Rana
- Muqtadir Akhtar Shabbir
- Syed Ali Imran Jaffri
- Salman Mansoor
- Muhammad Arif Awan

== See also ==
- Pakistan Bar Council
- Punjab Bar Council
- Sindh Bar Council
- Balochistan Bar Council
- Khyber Pakhtunkhwa Bar Council
- Lahore High Court Bar Association
- Lahore Bar Association
