= Khyber Pakhtunkhwa Bar Council =

- د خیبر پښتونخوا د وکیلانو شورا
- Formation: 1974
- Type: Public Body
- Purpose: Bar associations
- Headquarters: Peshawar, Pakistan
- Region served: Khyber Pakhtunkhwa, Pakistan
- Official language: English
- Chairman: Shumail Ahmad Butt
- Website: www.kpbarcouncil.com

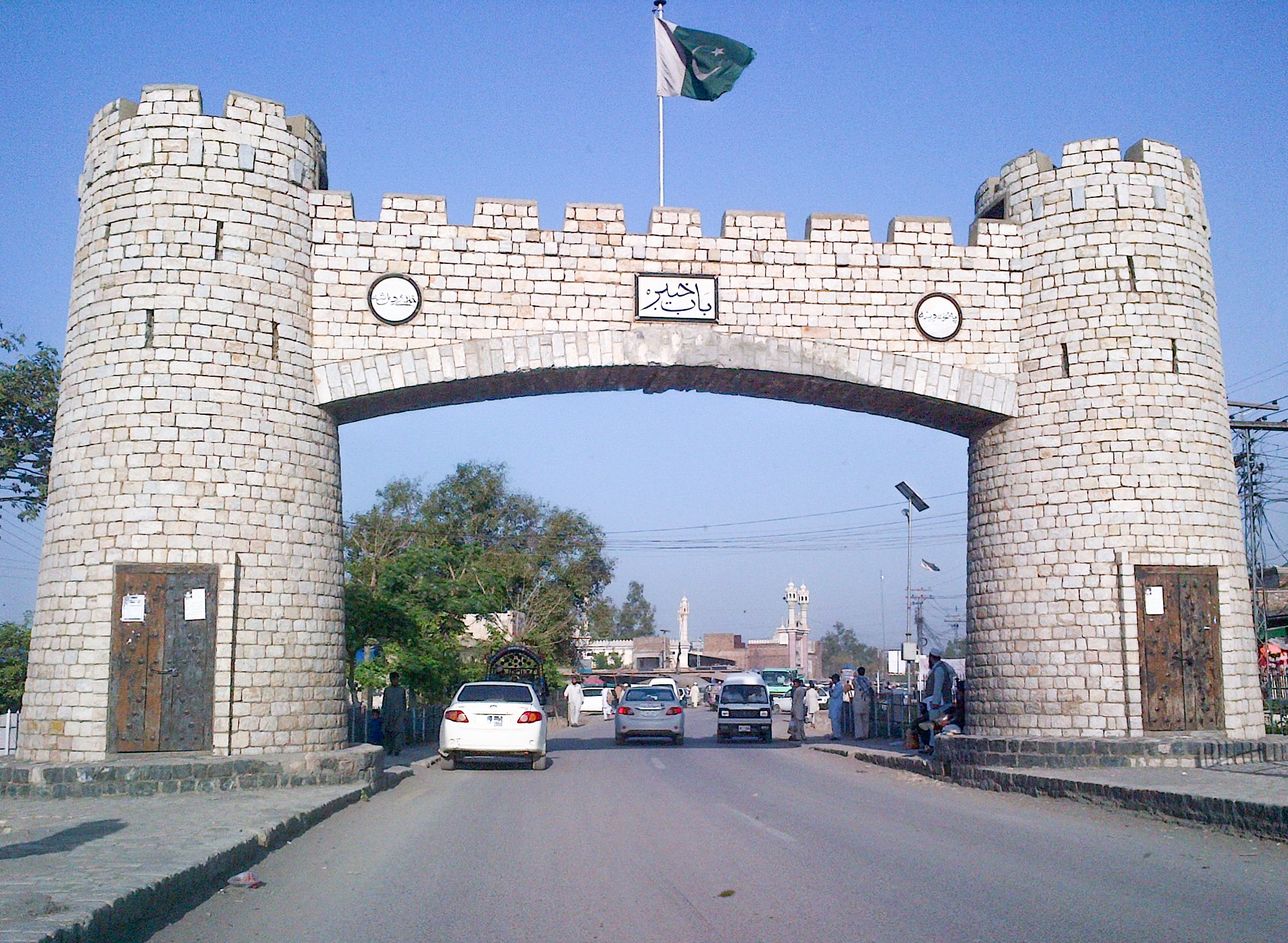

The Khyber Pakhtunkhwa Bar Council, also known as KP Bar Council, is a statutory elected and deliberative assembly of lawyers in Khyber Pakhtunkhwa for safeguarding the rights, interests and privileges of practicing lawyers, within Khyber Pakhtunkhwa province of Pakistan. The council also works on regulating the conduct of lawyers and helping them in the administration of justice. It came into being as a result of the promulgation of the Legal Practitioners and Bar Councils Act, 1973 (Act XXXV of 1973). The Council commenced functioning on 1 January 1974. All lower court and Peshawar High Court lawyers within Khyber Pakhtunkhwa are licensed with this council.

== Composition ==
The Khyber_Pakhtunkhwa Bar Council consists of Chairman Executive Committee & Vice Chairman, both elected by Members of Khyber Pakhtunkhwa Bar Council each Year and Members of Khyber Pakhtunkhwa Bar Council elected by the advocates from different constituencies across the Khyber Pakhtunkhwa Province. Members serve a term of five years, beginning on January 1, with elections held each November to fill seats of those whose terms will expire in the following January. The Advocate General of the Khyber Pakhtunkhwa, acts as ex officio Chairman of Khyber Pakhtunkhwa Bar Council.

== See also ==
- List of Pakistani Lawyers
- Pakistan Bar Council
- Supreme Court Bar Association of Pakistan
- Punjab Bar Council
- Lahore High Court Bar Association
- Sindh Bar Council
- Balochistan Bar Council
- Islamabad Bar Council
- Lahore Bar Association
