= Sindh Bar Council =

Pakistani provincial regulatory body of lawyers

- شورای وکلاء سندھ
- Type: Public Body
- Purpose: Bar associations
- Headquarters: Karachi, Pakistan
- Region served: Sindh, Pakistan
- Official language: English
- Website: sindhbarcouncil.org

The Sindh Bar Council is a statutory regulatory body of lawyers in Sindh for safeguarding the rights, interests, rights and privileges of practicing lawyers, within the province of Sindh, Pakistan. The Council is a deliberative body which regulates the conduct of lawyers and helps in the administration of justice. It has been constituted under Section 3(ii) of the Legal Practitioners and Bar Councils Act, 1973. All advocates practicing in any court or tribunal in Sindh are licensed and regulated by the Council. Advocates licensed and regulated by other provincial bar councils can also practice in Sindh.

== Composition ==
The Sindh Bar Council consists of Vice Chairman and Chairman Executive Committee, both elected by Members of Sindh Bar Council each year and Members of Sindh Bar Council are elected by the advocates from different constituencies across the Sindh Province. Members serve a term of five years, beginning on January 1, with elections held each November to fill seats of those whose terms will expire in the following January. The Advocate General of the Sindh (grade 22), acts as ex officio Chairman of Sindh Bar Council. The current honourable Advocate General of Sindh and Chairman of Sindh Bar Council is Mr. Jawad Dero

=== Electoral Officers ===
- Vice Chairman: Vice Chairman is figurehead of Bar Council and is elected by the members of the Council in January each year. Vice Chairman is ex officio Member of each Committee of Bar Council. Traditionally, the office of vice chairman is considered to be the foremost elected position in the council but however, the executive powers of Bar Council rest with Chairman Executive Committee.
- Chairman Executive: The Chairman of the Executive Committee is generally the most powerful office of Bar Council and is elected by the members of the Council in each year. Chairman Executive Committee has full authority to decide matters of Bar Council in every aspect.
- Members of Sindh Bar Council are Elected after 4 years for a duration of 5 years by Elected Representatives of Lawyers of in Provincial Bar Councils.

=== Permanent Officer ===
- Secretary: The Secretary is a full-time employee of Grade 21 or 22 who is responsible for the performance of the statutory duties under the Legal Practitioners and Bar Councils Act, 1973. Subject to the provisions of the act and the rules the secretary acts under the supervisory control of the Executive Committee of the Sindh Bar Council.

== Functions ==
The Council is responsible for regulating the legal profession and practice of law in Sindh. It maintains the roll of advocates licensed to practice law in the province of Sindh and is responsible for admitting new members to the bar.

The Council also constitutes a tribunal that conducts trials of alleged misconduct and professional negligence committed by advocates on its roll.

== See also ==
- List of Pakistani Lawyers
- Pakistan Bar Council
- Punjab Bar Council
- Supreme Court Bar Association of Pakistan
- Lahore High Court Bar Association
- Balochistan Bar Council
- Khyber Pakhtunkhwa Bar Council
- Lahore Bar Association
