= Punjab Bar Council =

Organization of lawyers in Punjab, Pakistan

- Logo of the Punjab Bar Council
- Formation: 1 January 1974; 52 years ago
- Type: Public Body
- Headquarters: Lahore, Pakistan
- Coordinates: 31°33′38″N 74°18′52″E
- Region served: Punjab, Pakistan
- Official language: English
- Website: www.pbbarcouncil.com

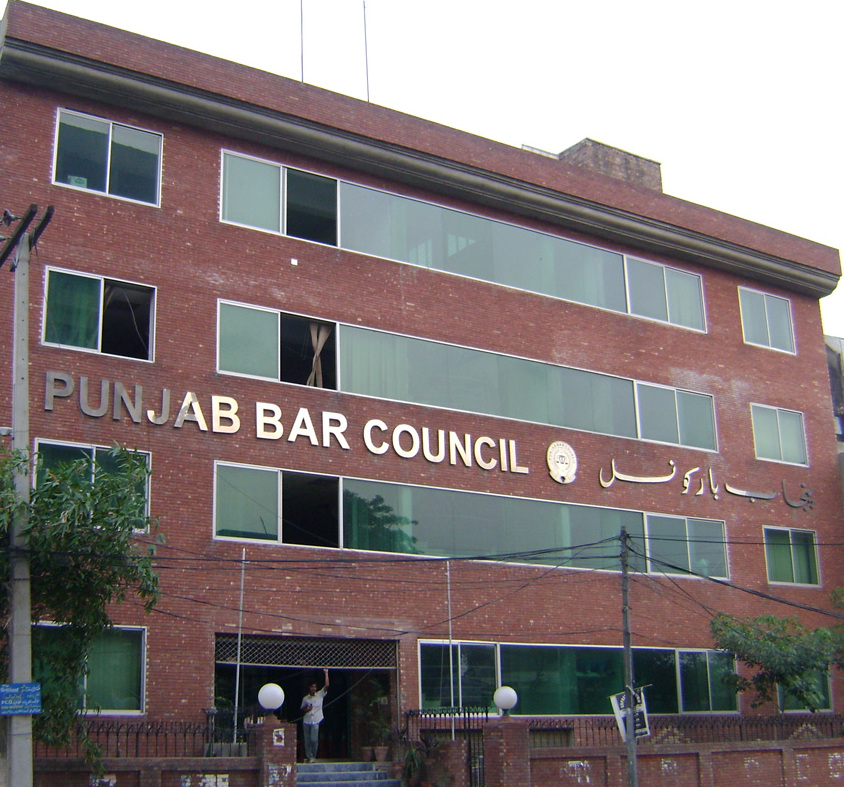

The Punjab Bar Council (Urdu: پنجاب بار کونسل) is a deliberative assembly of lawyers in Punjab, Pakistan.

It was established by the Parliament of Pakistan and consists of 75 members elected from different constituencies of Punjab, Pakistan. Its main functions are to promote and suggest law reforms, to safeguard the rights, interests and privileges of practicing lawyers while regulating their conduct, to recognize or derecognize Bar associations and to help in the administration of justice.

== Composition ==
The Punjab Bar Council consists of 75 members elected by the advocates from different constituencies across the Punjab province. The elected members serve a term of five years and further elect a Chairman, a vice-chairman and an executive committee of thee council each Year. The Advocate General of the Punjab acts as ex officio Chairman but being non-elected does not exercise the power as do the elected positions in the council. Power of Advocate General of Punjab is only limited to his role as returning officer of elections and in publishing the gazette.

The composition of the bar council for 2021–2025 term has been retained by the Independent Lawyers Group.

== Chairman Executive, Punjab Bar Council ==
The Chairman Executive Committee is practically the most powerful office of Bar Council and is elected by the members of the Council in each year. Chairman Executive Committee has full authority to decide matters of Bar Council in every aspect. under the Punjab Legal Practitioners and Bar Councils Rules, 1974, the Chairman of Executive Committee exercise the powers (a) to implement the decisions of Bar Council (b) to advise the Bar Council in all matters relating to its functions (c) to supervise and deal with the all matters regarding administration of the Bar Council (d) to constitute sub-committee and to entrust such of its functions thereto as may be necessary (e) to institute and defend other proceedings on the behalf of Bar Council (f) to perform such functions as the Bar Council may entrust to it.

== Vice Chairman, Punjab Bar Council ==
Vice Chairman is figurehead of Bar Council and Elected by the members of the Council in January each year. VC plays the role of speaker and is traditionally considered as holding the foremost elected position in the bar council. Under the Punjab Legal Practitioners and Bar Councils Rules 1974, Vice Chairman is ex officio Member of each Committee of Bar Council. Executive powers of the council are however rest with the Executive Committee.

== Secretary, Punjab Bar Council ==
Secretary is usually an officer of Grade 20 or 21. He is non-elected and full-time semi-government employee, responsible to perform duties enshrined under the Legal Practitioners and Bar Councils Act, 1973, and the Punjab Legal Practitioners & Bar Council Rules, 1974 and to deal with the administrative affairs. secretary works under the supervisory control of the Executive Committee of Punjab Bar Council.

== List of Elected Leaders ==
Year	Chairman Executive	Vice Chairman
2009-10	Rana Arif Kamal Noon	Asif Ali Malik
2010-11	Rana Muhammad Akram Khan	Mumtaz Mustafa
2011-12	Zafar Mehmood Mughal	Muhammad Lehrasib Khan Gondal
2012-13	Rana Muhammad Asif Saeed	Malik Ghulam Abbas Nissoana
2013-14	Tahir Nasrullah Warraich	Ahmer Hussain Cheema
2014-15 Elections Could not take place	Executive of council dissolved	2013-14 Vice Chairman (Continued)
2015-16	Chaudhry Abdus Salam	Miss Farah Ejaz Baig
2016-17	Mumtaz Mustafa	Muhammad Hussain
2017-18	Syed Azmat Bukhari	Inayat Awan
2018-19	Bushra Qamar	Jam M Younis
2019-20	Iftikhar Ibrahim Qureshi	Shahnawaz Ismail Gujjar
2020-21	Jamil Asghar Bhatti	Akram Khaksar
2021-22	Sardar Abdul Basit Khan Baloch	Amjad Iqbal Khan
2022-23	Malik Farooq Khokar	Jafar Tayyar Bukhari
2023-24	Tahir Shabbir Chaudhry	Basharat Ullah Khan
2024-25	Peer Imran Bodla	Kamran Bashir Mughal
2025-26	Farooq Dogar	Irfan Tarar
2026-27	Fakhar Hayat Awan	Khawaja Qaiser Butt

== Member Judicial Commission of Pakistan ==
- Punjab Bar Council (through majority decision) sends one of its Member to the Judicial Commission of Pakistan for a period of 2 years, He gives his opinion and vote for the appointments of Lahore High Court Judges and for the appointment of the Chief Justice of High Court.

== See also ==
- Pakistan Bar Council
- Supreme Court Bar Association of Pakistan
- Lahore High Court Bar Association
- Sindh Bar Council
- Balochistan Bar Council
- Khyber Pakhtunkhwa Bar Council
- List of Law Schools approved by Punjab Bar Council
