= List of chief justices of Lahore High Court =

This is the list of chief justices of Lahore High Court.

== List of justices of Lahore High Court ==
These are the names of the judges of the Lahore High court.

Temporal order	Name	Term of office	Appointed by	Reason for end of term	Comments
1.	Muneeb Ahmed	1866–1867			
2.	Charles Boulnois	1867–1877			
3.	Charles Richard Lindsay	1877–1890			
4.	Sir Mohammad Abdur Rahman	1942-1948			Elevated to the Federal Court of Pakistan

== List of chief justices of Lahore High Court ==
These are the names of the chief justices of the Lahore High Court.

Temporal order	Name	Term of office	Appointed by	Reason for end of term	Comments
1.	Sir Charles Arthur Roe	1895–1898			
2.	Sir William Ovens Clark	1898–1909			
3.	Sir Arthur Hay Stewart Reid	1909–1914			
4.	Sir Alfred Kensington	1914–1915			
5.	Sir Donald Campbell Johnstone	1915–1917			
6.	Sir Henry Adolphus Rattigan	1917–1919			
7.	Sir Shadi Lal	1920–1934			
8.	Sir John Douglas Young	1934–1943			
9.	Sir Arthur Trevor Harries	1943–1946			
10.	Sir Abdul Rashid	1946–1948			
11.	Muhammad Munir	1949–1954			
12.	Dr. Sheikh Abdul Rahman	1954–1955		Elevated to Supreme Court of Pakistan	As a result of One Unit formation, he was made Chief Justice West Pakistan High Court during 1955–1958
13.	Muhammad Rustam Kayani	1958–1962			
14.	Sheikh Manzur Qadir	1962–1963			
15.	Abdul Aziz Khan	1963–1965			
17.	Inamullah Khan	1965–1967			
18.	Waheed-ud-Din Ahmad	1967 – September 22, 1969		Elevated to Supreme Court of Pakistan	
19.	Qadeer-ud-Din Ahmad	1969–1970			
20.	Sheikh Anwarul Haq	1970 – October 16, 1972		Elevated to Supreme Court of Pakistan	
21.	Sardar Muhammad Iqbal	October 16, 1972 – 1976			
22.	Aslam Riaz Hussain	1976 – January 11, 1978		Elevated to Supreme Court of Pakistan	
23.	Maulvi Mushtaq Hussain	January 12, 1978– June 1, 1980		Elevated to Supreme Court of Pakistan	
24.	Shamim Hussain Qadri	1980–1982			
25.	Dr. Javed Iqbal	1982 – October 5, 1986		Elevated to Supreme Court of Pakistan	
26.	Ghulam Mujaddid Mirza	1986 – April 21, 1988		Elevated to Supreme Court of Pakistan	
27.	Abdul Shakurul Salam	1988–1989		Elevated to Supreme Court of Pakistan	
28.	Mohammad Rafique Tarar	1989 – October 31, 1991		Elevated to Supreme Court of Pakistan	
29.	Mian Mahboob Ahmad	1991–1994			
30.	Muhammad Ilyas	1994–1995			
*.	Irshad Hassan Khan	June 19, 1995 – April 15, 1996			Acting Chief Justice
31.	Chaudhary Zahid	May 15, 1996 – December 17, 1996		Elevated to Supreme Court of Pakistan	
32.	Sh. Ijaz Nisar	December 17, 1996 – May 28, 1997		Elevated to Supreme Court of Pakistan	
33.	Sheikh Riaz Ahmad	May 29, 1997 – November 3, 1997		Elevated to Supreme Court of Pakistan	
34.	Rashid Aziz Khan	November 4, 1997 – February 4, 2000			
35.	Mian Allah Nawaz	February 5, 2000 – July 13, 2000	Muhammad Rafiq Tarar		
36.	Falak Sher	July 14, 2000 – September 6, 2002	Muhammad Rafiq Tarar	Elevated to Supreme Court of Pakistan	
37.	Iftikhar Hussain Chaudhry	September 7, 2002 – December 31, 2007	Pervez Musharraf	Normal Retirement	Took oath under PCO 1999 and later PCO 2007 as sitting judge of Lahore High Court
38.	Sayed Zahid Hussain	January 1, 2008 – April 12, 2009	Pervez Musharraf	Elevated to Supreme Court of Pakistan	Took oath under PCO 1999 and later PCO 2007 as sitting judge of Lahore High Court
39.	Khawaja Muhammad Sharif	April 13, 2009 – December 8, 2010	Asif Ali Zardari	Retired	
40.	Ijaz Ahmad Chaudhry	December 9, 2010 – November 16, 2011	Asif Ali Zardari	Elevated to Supreme Court of Pakistan	
41.	Sheikh Azmat Saeed	November 17, 2011 – May 31, 2012	Asif Ali Zardari	Elevated to Supreme Court of Pakistan	
42.	Umar Ata Bandial	1 June 2012 – 17 June 2014	Asif Ali Zardari	elevated to Supreme Court of Pakistan	
43.	Khawaja Imtiaz Ahmad	17 June 2014 – 5 November 2015	Mamnoon Hussain	Retired	
44.	Manzoor Ahmad Malik	30 March 2015 to 5 November 2015	Mamnoon Hussain	Elevated to Supreme Court of Pakistan	
45.	Ijazul Ahsan	6 November 2015 to 27 June 2016	Mamnoon Hussain	Elevated to Supreme Court of Pakistan	
46.	Syed Mansoor Ali Shah	28 June 2016 – 06 Feb 2018	Mamnoon Hussain		
47.	Syed Yawar Ali	7 Feb 2018–21 October 2018	Mamnoon Hussain		
48.	Muhammad Anwaarul Haq	22 October 2018- 31 December 2018	Arif Alvi		
49.	Sardar Muhammad Shamim Khan	01 Jan 2019 - 31 December 2019	Arif Alvi		
50.	Mamoon Rashid Sheikh	1st Jan 2020 - 18 Mar 2020	Arif Alvi		Retired
51.	Muhammad Qasim Khan	19 March 2020 – 5 July 2021	Arif Alvi		
