= Bajwa =

Surname in India and Pakistan

- Jāti: Jat
- Religions: Islam, Hinduism, Sikhism
- Languages: Punjabi
- Country: Pakistan, India
- Region: Punjab
- Ethnicity: Punjabi

Bajwa is a tribe of Jats and a surname found among Jat Sikhs, Muslims and Hindus of the Punjab region in India and Pakistan.

The 'Bajwat' region of modern Pakistani Punjab is named Bajwa zamindars who once ruled the area. The city of Narowal, in Punjab, was founded by Baba Naro Bajwa in the 16th century.

Notable people bearing the Bajwa name, who may or may not be affiliated with the clan, include:

- Ali Zia Bajwa, Pakistani jurist
- Asif Bajwa (born 1969), Pakistani field hockey player
- Asim Saleem Bajwa, Pakistani former military officer
- Charanjit Kaur Bajwa (born 1959), Indian politician
- Dilpreet Bajwa (born 2003), Indian cricketer
- Ehsan Ul Haq Bajwa, Pakistani politician
- Iram Hassan Bajwa, Pakistani politician
- Javed Ashraf Bajwa, Pakistani military officer
- Jugpreet Singh Bajwa (born 1994), Indian-Canadian singer
- Muhammad Asif Bajwa, Pakistani politician
- Neeru Bajwa (born 1982), Indian-Canadian actress
- Poonam Bajwa, Indian actress
- Pratap Singh Bajwa (born 1957), Indian politician
- Qamar Javed Bajwa (born 1960), Pakistani military general, retired as Army Chief
- Rupa Bajwa (born 1976), Indian writer
- Sonam Bajwa (born 1989), Indian model and actress
- Surinder Singh Bajwa (c. 1955–2007), Indian politician
- Tariq Bajwa, Pakistani civil servant
- Tariq Mahmood Bajwa, Pakistani politician
- Tripat Rajinder Singh Bajwa, Indian politician
- T. S. Bajwa, Indian politician
- Varinder Singh Bajwa, Indian politician
