= Muhammad Yawar Ali =

Pakistani jurist

- محمد یاور علی

46th Chief Justice of Lahore High Court
- In office 7 February 2018 – 22 October 2018
- Preceded by: Syed Mansoor Ali Shah
- Succeeded by: Muhammad Anwaarul Haq

Additional Justice of Lahore High Court
- In office 19 February 2010 – 6 February 2018

Deputy Attorney General for Pakistan

Personal details
- Born: 23 October 1956 (age 70)
- Education: Aitchison College, Lahore; University of the Punjab; University of Leeds; Middle Temple

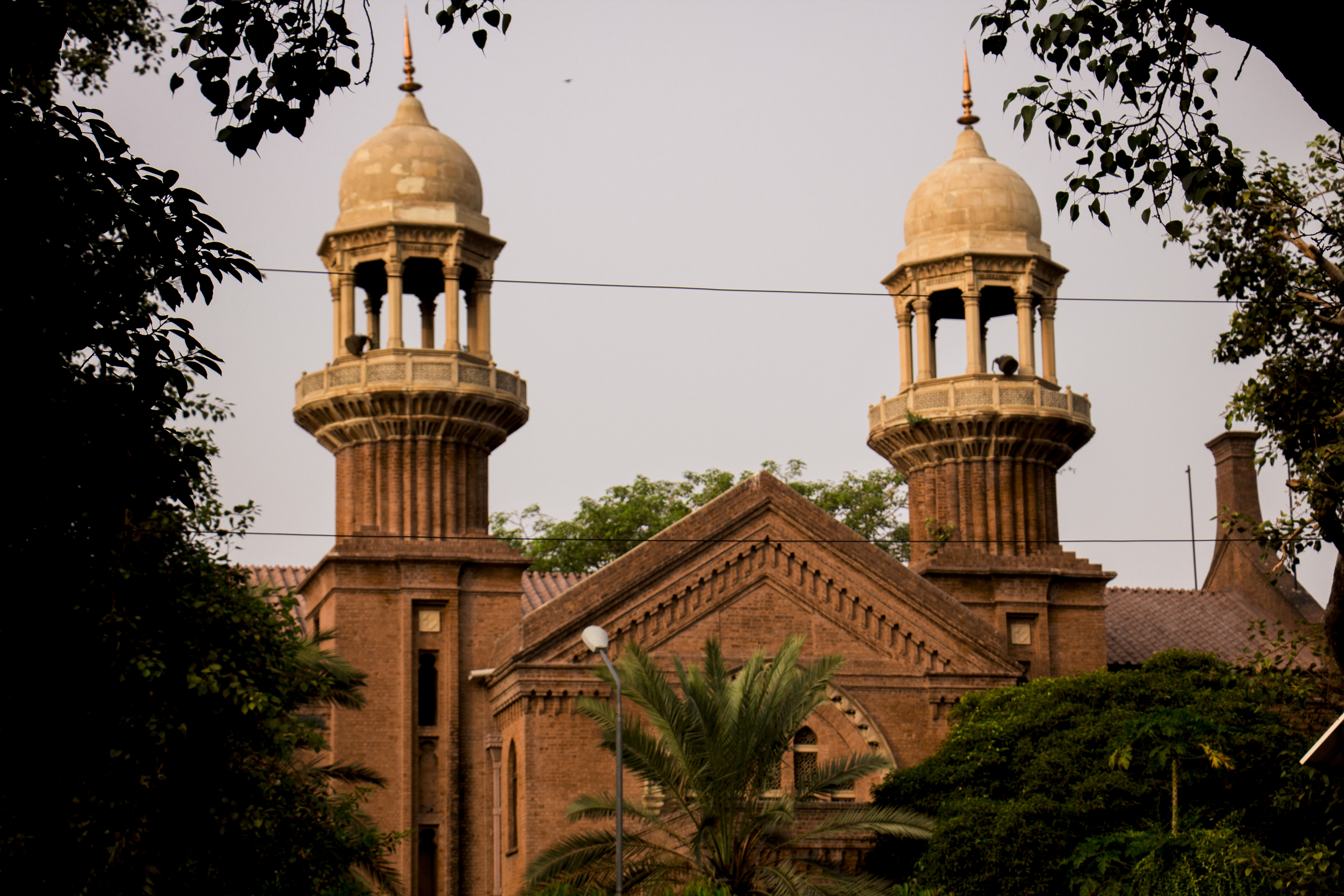
Lahore High Court

Muhammad Yawar Ali (Urdu: محمد یاور علی; born 23 October 1956) is a Pakistani jurist who served as the 46th Chief Justice of Lahore High Court.

== Career ==
Ali was appointed as an additional judge of the Lahore High Court (LHC) on 19 February 2010. He was appointed as the LHC Chief Justice on 7 February 2018. Upon Ali's retirement on 22 October 2018, he was succeeded as the LHC Chief Justice by Justice Muhammad Anwaarul Haq.

Legal offices
Preceded by Syed Mansoor Ali Shah	46th Chief Justice of Lahore High Court	Succeeded by Muhammad Anwaarul Haq
