= Abid Aziz Sheikh =

Pakistani jurist

Justice of the Lahore High Court
- Incumbent
- Assumed office 12 April 2013

Personal details
- Born: 26 April 1967 (age 59)

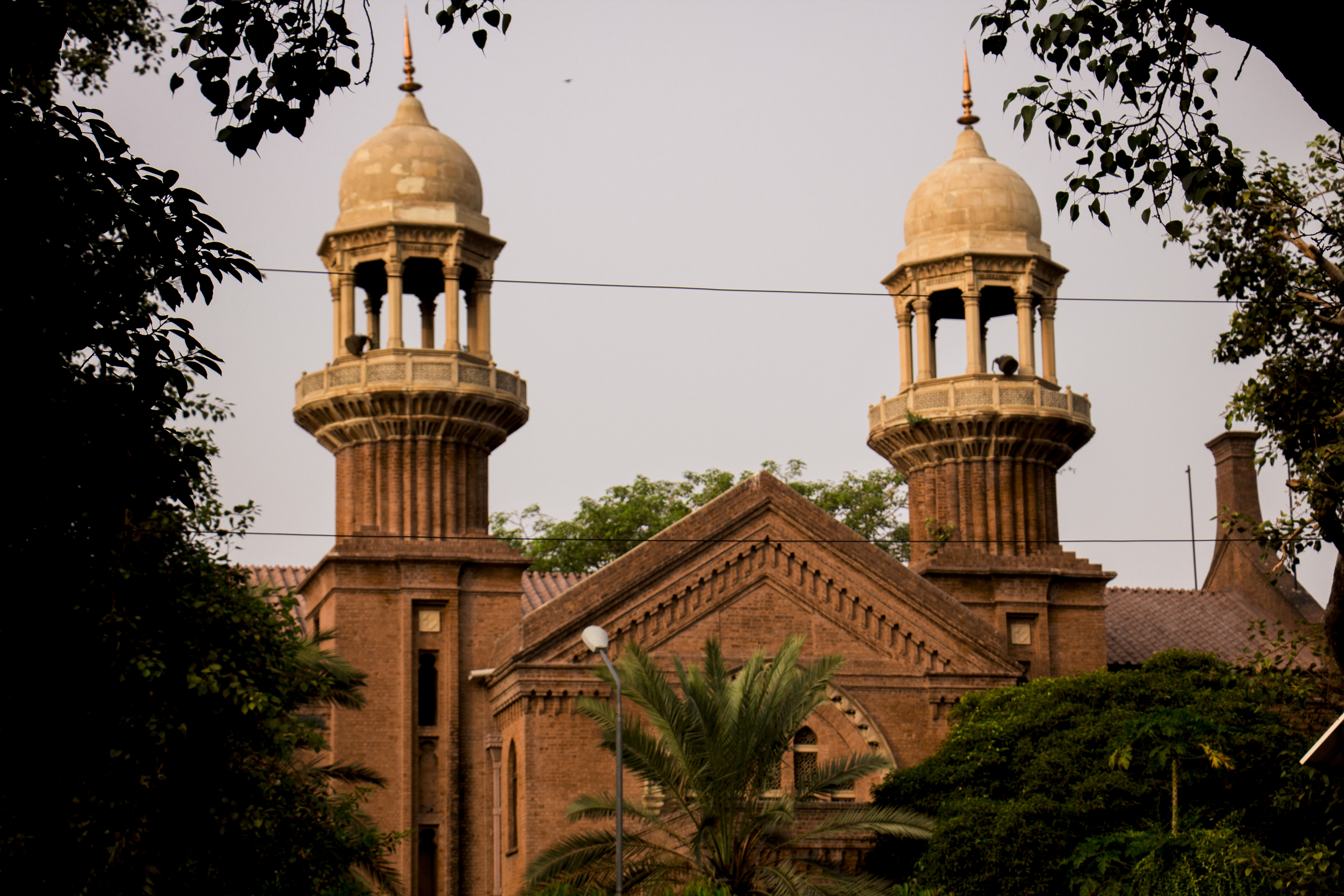
Lahore High Court

Abid Aziz Sheikh (born 26 April 1967) is a Pakistani jurist who has been a Justice of the Lahore High Court since 12 April 2013.

In 2024, Sheikh was filling in as the acting Chief Justice of the Lahore High Court while the actual Chief Justice, Aalia Neelum, was out of Pakistan.

== Early life and education ==
Sheikh was born on 26 April 1967, in Lahore. He completed his early education in Lahore and earned his Bachelor of Arts degree from Government College University, Lahore in 1987. He then pursued his legal studies at Punjab University Law College, where he obtained his LL.B degree in 1990. In 1992, he received his LL.M from University of the Punjab. The following year, he continued his studies in the United Kingdom, obtaining an LL.M with a focus on Public Law from King's College London.

== Career ==
=== Acting Chief Justice ===
In August 2024, Sheikh took the oath as Chief Justice of the Lahore High Court, serving as the acting Chief Justice while the incumbent, Aalia Neelum, was out of Pakistan.
