= Ahmad Awais =

Pakistani Supreme Court advocator

Advocate General Punjab
- In office 2018–2023

Central Vice-President of Pakistan Tehreek-e-Insaf
- In office 2008–2018

President of the Lahore High Court Bar Association
- In office February 2004 – February 2005

Personal details
- Born: Lahore, Punjab, Pakistan
- Party: PTI (2005-present)
- Relatives: Hamid Gul (brother-in-law)
- Education: University of Punjab
- Occupation: Lawyer, politician
- Portfolio: https://www.awaislaw.com/team/ahmad-awais/
- Website: https://www.awaislaw.com

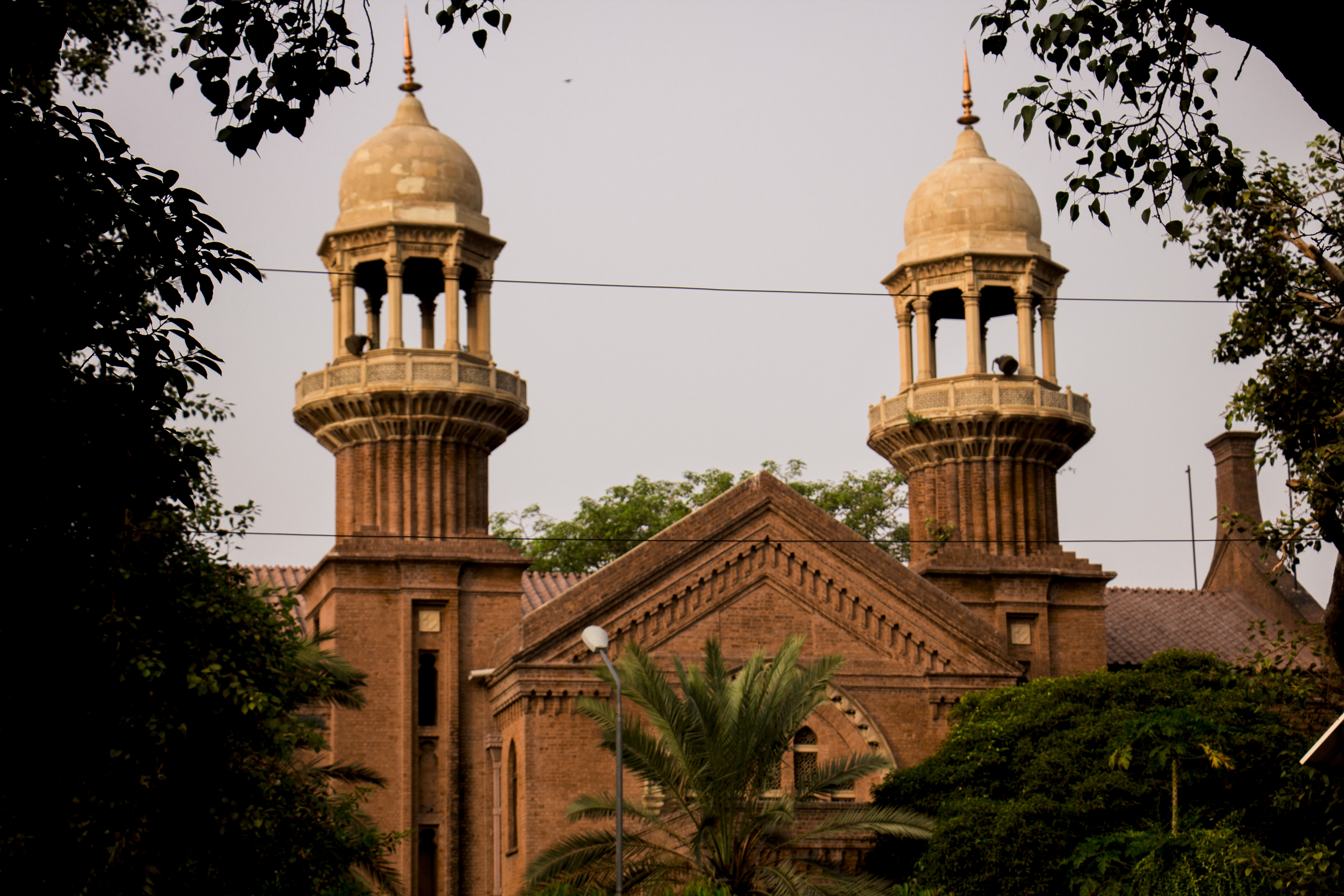
Lahore High Court where Office of Advocate General Punjab is situated

Ahmad Awais (Urdu: احمد اویس) is a senior Advocate Supreme Court of Pakistan, who also served as Advocate General Punjab from 2018 to 2023, in the PTI Government 2018. He also remained the President of Lahore High Court Bar Association, Lahore from 2004 to 2005. He is senior member of PTI (Pakistan Tehrik Insaaf) and brother in law of General Hamid Gul who remained Chief of ISI. In his election campaign when he was contesting Bar election of High Court Bar Association he claimed that he will conduct criminal trial, in the Bar, of the dictator General Pervez Musharraf. His sons and son in law, are also advocates and member of the Bar Association.

Awais has been appointed Advocate General Punjab for the second time on 29.07.2020.

== Professional life ==
He is senior Advocate Supreme Court of Pakistan, his family has number of Lawyers including his son and son in law, Usman Arif who is presently serving as Deputy Attorney General for Pakistan. He remained President of Lahore High Court Bar Association for the term 2004–5.

== Advocate General Punjab ==
He was appointed Advocate General Punjab in 2018 to represent the cases of Punjab Government before Supreme Court of Pakistan and Lahore High Court. During the case of Model Town riot in which 14 person were brutally killed and hundreds were injured and a high power JIT was constituted to investigate the matter and a Full Bench of Lahore High Court rejected plea taken by Advocate General Punjab on which some derogatory and harsh words were exchanged during the arguments, on which a Contempt Notice was issued to the Advocate General then he resigned from the Post of Advocate General Punjab.

In March 2020, he was again appointed Advocate General Punjab.

== See also ==
- Supreme Court Bar Association of Pakistan
- Lahore High Court Bar Association
- Advocate General Punjab
