= Shahid Jamil Khan =

Pakistani jurist

Judge of the Lahore High Court
- In office 22 March 2014 – 2 February 2024

Personal details
- Profession: Jurist

Shahid Jamil Khan is a Pakistani former jurist who served as a judge of the Lahore High Court from 2014 until his resignation in 2024. Before his elevation to the bench, he worked mainly in tax and corporate law and served as a legal adviser to the Federal Board of Revenue and as a member of the Income Tax Appellate Tribunal.

== Legal career ==
Before joining the bench, Khan practised law in Lahore and was associated with the Lahore High Court Bar Association and tax bar. He later served as a legal adviser to the Federal Board of Revenue for about seven years and as a member of the Income Tax Appellate Tribunal.

He also remained finance secretary of the Lahore High Court Bar Association, an executive member of the Supreme Court Bar Association, and vice chairman of the Tax Reforms Committee. He taught at Quaid-i-Azam Law College and delivered lectures at the Punjab Judicial Academy and the Directorate General of Training and Research (Inland Revenue).

== Judicial career ==
On 22 March 2014, Khan took oath as an additional judge of the Lahore High Court along with seven other appointees. In March 2016, the Judicial Commission of Pakistan recommended his confirmation as a permanent judge of the Lahore High Court. Khan resigned from the Lahore High Court on 2 February 2024, citing personal reasons, nearly four years before his scheduled superannuation.
