= Bajwat =

Area in Pakistan

- Country: Pakistan

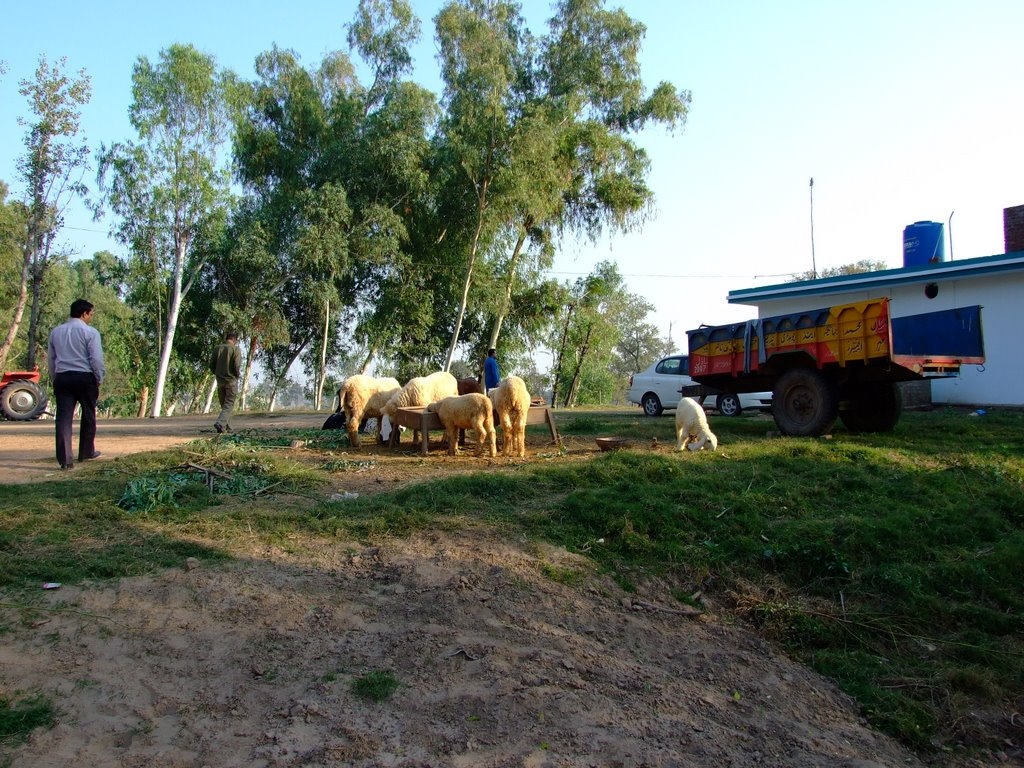

Bajwat (Punjabi, Urdu: بجوات) is a region in Punjab in Pakistan, encompassing parts of the Sialkot district and Narowal district. As of 2017, it comprised 84 towns or small villages, with a population of 60,000.

Before the partition of British India in 1947, Bajwat was primarily inhabited by Punjabi Bajwa Jat zamindars. The region contains wetlands with the presence of Marala Headworks, Manawar Tawi River, Jammu Tawi, and many nullahs, ponds and marshy areas. This habitat attracts a large number of waterfowl and other birds, as well as migratory species. Marala Headworks, built between 1965 and 1968, is located in Bajwat's south-west corner. Two canals, Upper Chenab and the Marala-Ravi link canal, flow from Marala Headworks. These canals also provide habitats for the avian fauna of the area. The Wildlife Department of Punjab has designated sections of the area a game reserve. The area is sub-mountainous and 800 feet (244 metres) above sea level. The soil is loamy and non-calcareous with sandy and clay components predominating. Average rainfall is 965 mm.

== Geography ==
Bajwat covers an area of 19,452 hectares (48,070 acres). The city of Jammu is located in eastern Bajwat; Jourian in Kashmir and Sialkot city are in the south, with Gujrat district to the west. A 60-kilometer length of the northern and eastern border forms part of the Line of Control between Pakistan and Kashmir.

Bajwat encompasses a complex of natural rivers habitats along the Chenab River and two of its tributaries (Jamana Tavi and Manwran Tavi), extending up to the border with India.

=== Climate ===
Summer temperatures reach 46 degrees Fahrenheit, while the winter season sometimes records temperatures of 0 degrees Fahrenheit. Rainfall in the area is quite high, which sometimes results flooding and loss of crops.

=== Environment ===
Bajwat is a wetland, attracting avifauna, especially waterfowl, due to the presence of Marala Headworks, three rivers, more than six nullahs, and many ponds and marshy areas. These water reservoirs support a variety of aquatic and semi-aquatic plants, fishes, amphibians, aquatic arthropods and their larvae, supporting the avian fauna. Bajwat has a peninsula-shaped area protruding out to the Jammu region.

== Economy ==
=== Agriculture ===
Agriculture is the main occupation in Bajwat. Many crops are grown there, particularly wheat, rice and sugarcane. Orchards produce mangoes, oranges, strawberries and guavas.

== Culture and Entertainment ==
=== Games ===
Residents of Bajwat participate in activities including Kushti (Indian style wrestling), Lookn, and Matti. Popular sports include cricket and football.

== Politics ==
Punjabi Khatris migrated to the region. The three major castes in Bajwat are Gujjar, Rajput and Arain. As of 2018, Village Kachimand held considerablely higher political influence, with Loni Khari also holding considerable sway. The area is politically active, and is assiociated with Former National Assembly Speaker Chaudhry Amir Hussain. Phuklian serves as a local center, with a bazaar, post offices, schools, colleges, and national banks. The area is also served by the Phuklian police station, included in the larger Sialkot police station of Bajwat. The close proximity to the Pakistan-India border means that some communuities could be affected by cross-border firing during periods of conflict. Residents may leave affected areas in such periods.

== See also ==
- Bajwat Wildlife Sanctuary
