= Said Zaman Khan v. Federation of Pakistan =

Supreme Court of Pakistan decision

- Court: Supreme Court of Pakistan
- Full case name: Said Zaman Khan v. Federation of Pakistan through Secretary Ministry of Defence, Government of Pakistan Superintendent HSP, Sahiwal
- Decided: 29 August 2016; 10 years ago
- Citation: 2017 SCMR 1249; Civil Petition No. 842 of 2016

Court membership
- Judges sitting: Chief Justice; Anwar Zaheer Jamali Justices; Amir Hani Muslim; Sh. Azmat Saeed; Manzoor Ahmad Malik; Faisal Arab

Case opinions
- Decision by: Sh. Azmat Saeed
- Concurrence: All

Said Zaman Khan v. Federation of Pakistan is a landmark decision in which the Supreme Court of Pakistan upheld death sentences against sixteen terrorists convicted by military courts in 2016. The accused included members of militant groups Tehreek-i-Taliban Pakistan and al-Qaeda, as well as suspects involved in the Peshawar school massacre in 2014, the Bannu jailbreak in 2012, and the Rawalpindi Parade Lane bombing in 2009.

== Background ==
In the aftermath of the Peshawar school massacre on 16 December 2014, the government of Prime Minister Nawaz Sharif lifted the informal moratorium on the death penalty and authorized military courts to try civilians charged with terrorism, through the 21st Amendment to the Constitution of Pakistan. Persons accused of terrorism were tried by field general court martial (FGCM). In the event of conviction, their death warrants were signed by Chief of Army Staff General Raheel Sharif throughout 2015 and 2016.

=== Involvement in acts of terrorism ===
The terror suspects included members of militant groups Tehreek-i-Taliban Pakistan and al-Qaeda, and were convicted for involvement in:

- Peshawar school massacre, 16 December 2014
- Bannu jailbreak, 25 April 2012
- Rawalpindi Parade Lane bombing, 4 December 2009
- Naushera mosque attack, 12 June 2009
- Attacks on law enforcement agencies

== Opinion ==
A five-judge bench consisting of Chief Justice Anwar Zaheer Jamali, Amir Hani Muslim, Azmat Saeed, Manzoor Ahmad Malik and Faizal Arab upheld the death sentences, observing that the petitioners could not prove that the trials by the FGCM were mala fide with a collateral purpose.
