= Muzammil Akhtar Shabbir =

Justice of the Lahore High Court

Justice of the Lahore High Court
- Incumbent
- Assumed office 26 November 2016

Personal details
- Born: 14 January 1969 (age 57)

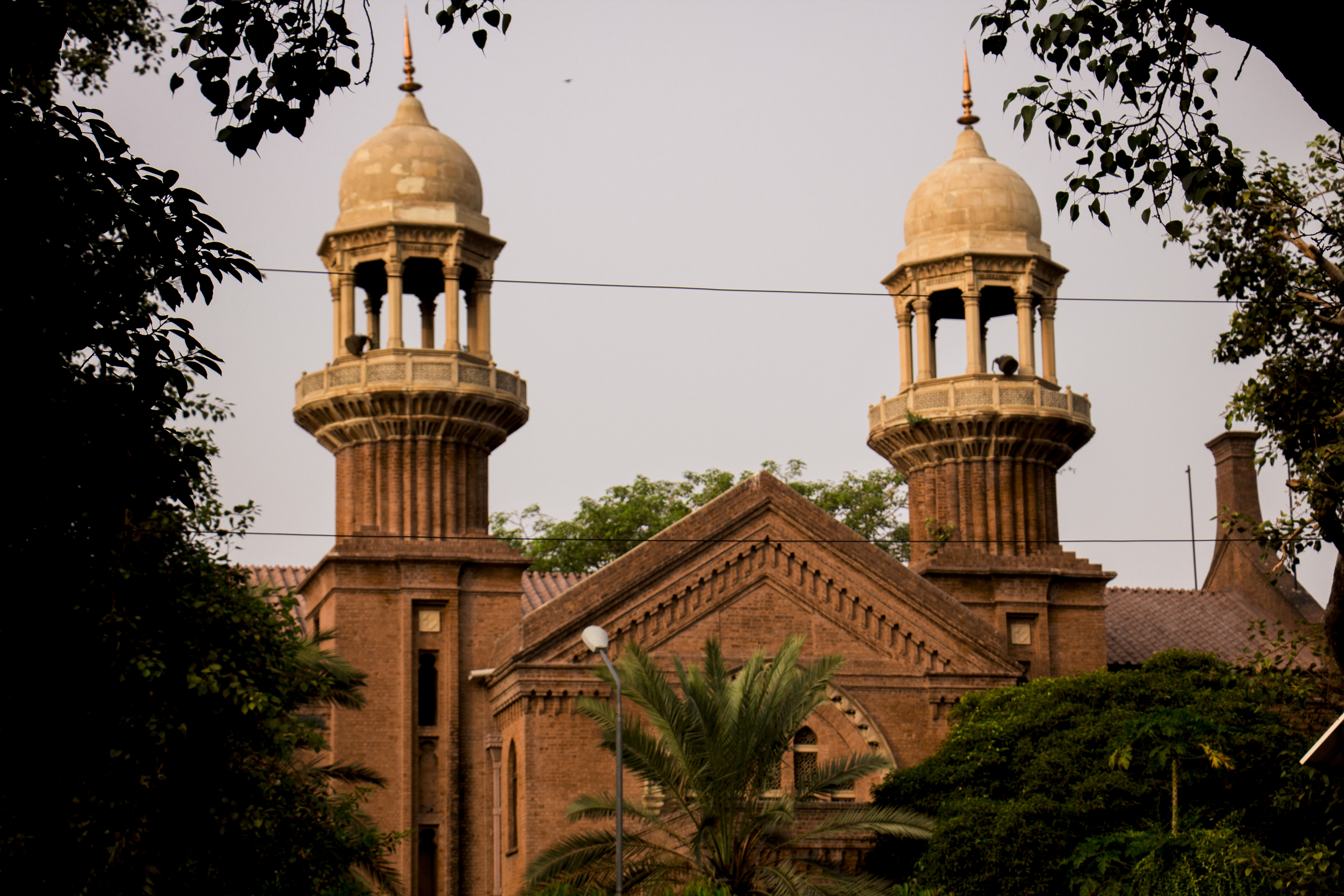
Lahore High Court

Muzammil Akhtar Shabbir (born 14 January 1969) is a Pakistani jurist who has been Justice of the Lahore High Court since 26 November 2016.

== Judicial career ==
Justice Shabbir was inducted into Lahore High Court (LHC) as an additional Judge on 26 November 2016. He became a permanent Judge of the LHC on 22 October 2018. Before elevation to the bench he was serving as a deputy Attorney General for Pakistan. Prior to that, he had been the Secretary Lahore High Court Bar Association, which is the biggest and oldest bar association of Pakistan.

== See also ==
- Lahore High Court
- Lahore High Court Bar Association
