= Sajid Mehmood Sethi =

Muhammad Sajid Mehmood Sethi

Justice of the Lahore High Court
- Incumbent
- Assumed office 8 June 2015

Personal details
- Born: 19 May 1968 (age 58)

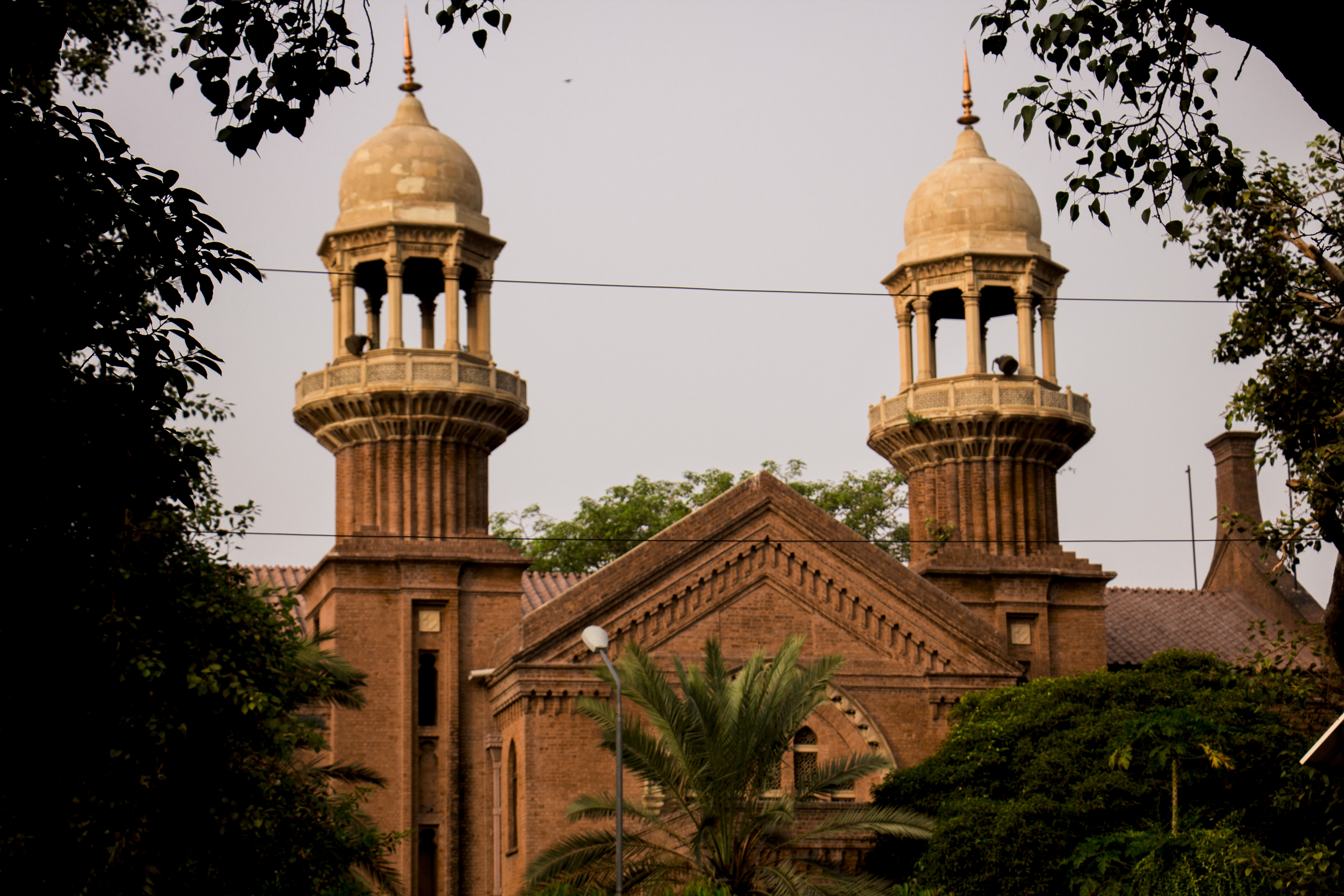
Lahore High Court

Muhammad Sajid Mehmood Sethi (born 19 May 1968) is a Pakistani jurist who has been a Justice of the Lahore High Court since 8 June 2015.

== Early life and education ==
Sethi was born in Lahore. He received his education at the University of the Punjab and Downing College, Cambridge. He joined private practice as a founding partner of Afridi, Shah & Minallah, and was involved in the Lawyers' Movement of 2007 seeking restoration of the judiciary.
