= Henry Plowden =

English judge and cricketer

Sir Henry Plowden
Personal information
- Full name: Henry Meredyth Plowden
- Born: 26 September 1840; Sylhet, Bengal Presidency, British India
- Died: 8 January 1920 (aged 79); Sunninghill, Berkshire, England
- Batting: Right-handed
- Bowling: Right-arm roundarm slow

Domestic team information
- Years: Team
- 1860–1863: Cambridge University
- 1863–1866: Marylebone Cricket Club
- 1865: Hampshire

Career statistics
| Competition | First-class |
|---|---|
| Matches | 15 |
| Runs scored | 248 |
| Batting average | 13.05 |
| 100s/50s | –/1 |
| Top score | 69* |
| Balls bowled | 1,173 |
| Wickets | 56 |
| Bowling average | 12.83 |
| 5 wickets in innings | 5 |
| 10 wickets in match | – |
| Best bowling | 7/25 |
| Catches/stumpings | 10/– |
- Source: Cricinfo, 25 January 2010

Sir Henry Meredyth Chichele Plowden (26 September 1840 — 8 January 1920) was an English first-class cricketer, barrister and judge in British India.

The son of George Augustus Chichele Plowden (1810–1871) and Charlotte Elise née Robertson (1821–1862), he was born in British India at Sylhet in September 1840. He was educated in England at Harrow School, where he played for the school cricket team. He was also a champion rackets player whilst at Harrow. From there, he matriculated to Trinity College, Cambridge. He was a member of the Cambridge University Cricket Club and made his debut in first-class cricket for the club against the Cambridge Town Club at Fenner's in 1860. He played first-class cricket for the university until 1863, making ten appearances; four of these came in The University Match against Oxford University at Lord's, gaining him his blue. He also captained the club in his final two years of study. Alongside playing for Cambridge, Plowden also played first-class cricket for the Gentlemen of England in 1862, and for the Marylebone Cricket Club (MCC) and Southgate in 1863. After graduating, he appeared twice more in first-class cricket; in 1865 for Hampshire against Surrey, and for the MCC against Hampshire in 1866. In a total of fifteen first-class appearances, Plowden scored 248 runs at an average of 13.05; he made one half century, a score of 69 not out. With his right-arm roundarm slow bowling, he took 56 wickets at a bowling average of 9.85; he took a five wicket haul on five occasions, with best figures of 7 for 25. His slow bowling was noted to be a rare precursor to modern day off break.

A member of Lincoln's Inn, he was called to the bar to practice as a barrister in June 1866. His law practice took him back to India, where he was the government advocate at Lahore from 1870 to 1877. His appointment as a judge of the Chief Court of the Punjab immediately followed, with him being appointed a senior judge in 1880. He was knighted in February 1887. Plowden retired from the court in 1894 and returned to England. Plowden remained interested in cricket upon his return, particularly pertaining to Harrow and Cambridge cricket, and was a regular attendee of matches at Lord's right up to the First World War. Following a long illness, he died in January 1920 at Sunninghill, Berkshire. He was married twice: firstly, to Helen Beadon, daughter of Sir Cecil Beadon, and secondly to Agnes née Sterndale. His second marriage produced two daughters.
