= Javed Ashraf Bajwa =

Pakistani military officer

- Born: Karachi, Pakistan
- Military career
- Allegiance: Pakistan
- Branch: Pakistan Army
- Service years: 1975 – 2005
- Rank: Brigadier
- Unit: Pakistan Army Corps of Engineers
- Commands: Frontier Works Organisation; Pakistan Engineers Battalion
- Conflicts: United Nations Mission in East Timor
- Awards: Sitara-i-Imtiaz (Military) (Star of Excellence) award by the Government of Pakistan in 2007
- Other work: Civil contractor at Pakistan Army Corps of Engineers

Javed Ashraf Bajwa (Punjabi: جاوید اشرف باجوا; Urdu: جاوید اشرف باجوہ) is a retired Pakistan Army engineer officer. Brigadier Javed Ashraf Bajwa was Commander of Frontier Works Organisation (FWO).

== Awards and recognition ==
- Sitara-i-Imtiaz (Military) (Star of Excellence) award by the Government of Pakistan in 2007.

== Career ==
Brigadier Javed Ashraf Bajwa was commander of Pakistan Engineers Battalion in East Timor in 2002.

As a civil engineer by profession, Bajwa has been associated with Pakistan's war-front and affected areas where he also led Pakistan Army Corps of Engineers to reconstruct and rehabilitate the towns and cities.

Since his retirement, he has been associated with the reconstruction of Sukkur Barrage, where he has closely worked with Pakistan Army Corps of Engineers and the civil contractors. In 2004, he is working in the construction of a new phase in Defence Housing Authority Islamabad.
