= Muhammad Raza Qureshi =

Justice of the Lahore High Court

- محمد رضا قریشی

Justice of the Lahore High Court
- Incumbent
- Assumed office 7 May 2021

Personal details
- Born: 15 September 1973 (age 53)

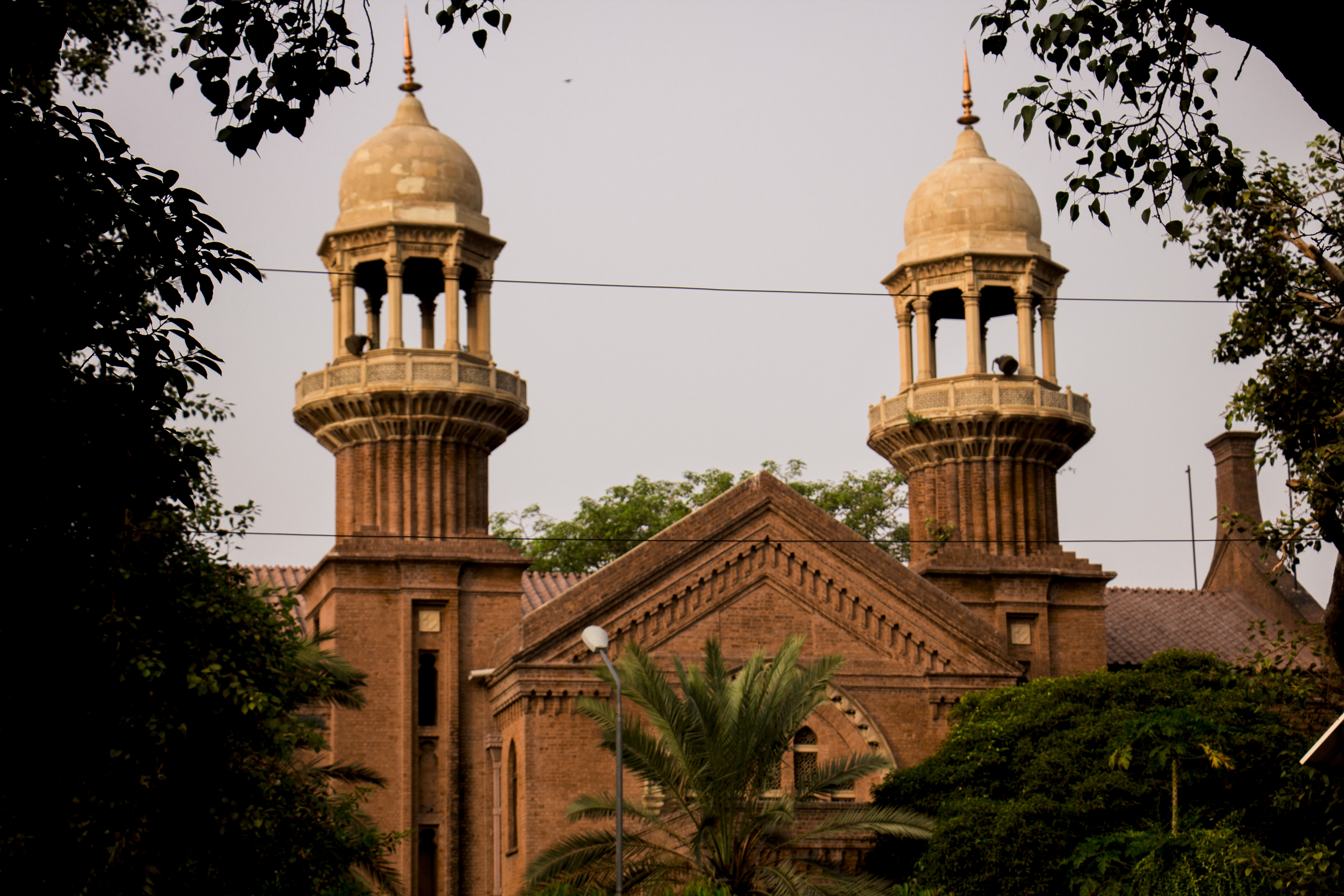
Lahore High Court

Muhammad Raza Qureshi (Urdu: محمد رضا قریشی, born 15 September 1973), is a Pakistani jurist and a Justice of the Lahore High Court.

== Career ==
Qureshi was appointed as an additional justice of the Lahore High Court (LHC) on 7 May 2021. The Judicial Commission of Pakistan officially endorsed his appointment as a permanent judge of LHC on 13 October 2022. He was sworn in as a permanent judge of LHC on 4 November 2022.

== Verdicts ==
On 13 February 2023, as LHC judge, he instructed the Punjab government to guarantee the enforcement of a Supreme Court verdict from 2015, mandating the adoption of Urdu as the official language.
