= Syed Afzal Haider =

Pakistani legal figure (1931–2022)

Syed Afzal Haider

Justice (R) Syed Afzal Haider (1931 – 2022) was a Pakistani legal figure and Jurist who remained the Provincial Law Minister of Punjab, Federal Minister for Law and Parliamentary Affairs, Justice of Federal Shariat Court. He was also an author of several books.

== Early life and education ==
Haider was born in Bazaar-e-Hakimaan, Lahore, Punjab, Pakistan on 19 August 1931, to Syed Muhammad Shah, Advocate, in respectable Syed family of Pakpattan, while his mother's family was from the Hakimkhana of Lahore.His mother was the daughter of Barrister Syed Amin-ul-Din (5th Muslim Barrister of India). His father was a leader of All India Muslim League and represented AIML in the Boundary Commission of India during Partition of 1947.

Haider received his early education (1936–1946) in his hometown and afterwards, he did his Intermediate Higher Secondary study at FC College in 1948, then graduated with a Bachelor of Arts degree from Government College Lahore in 1953, and afterwards graduated as a lawyer from the Punjab University Law College in 1955. He was enrolled as an advocate in 1956 and started practicing law. In addition, he had also been involved in various cultural and literary activities.

== Career ==
Apart from his legal concerns, Syed Afzal Haider also participated in cultural and social activities. In 1987 he conducted the “Baba Farid International Conference", to commemorate the work of the famous South Asian Sufi saint, Fariduddin Ganjshakar.

With regard to the Law and Constitution he participated in many international conferences and delivered many lectures on Human Rights. He held many offices throughout his life. He became member of Muslim Students Federation (Student Wing of All India Muslim League) in 1946. He got elected as General Secretary of Lahore High Court Bar Association in 1960 by defeating Nasim Hassan Shah (Former Chief Justice of Pakistan). He got elected as President of Lahore High Court Bar Association in 1983. He was the co-founder and co-chairman of All Pakistan Lawyers Action Committee (1983–1986). He remained Member of Pakistan Bar Council from 1984 to 1995. He remained vice-chairman of Pakistan Bar Council from 1988 to 1990. He remained Chairman Executive Committee of Pakistan Bar Council from 1990 to 1991. He was the longest serving member of Council of Islamic Ideology of Pakistan from 1989 to 2003. He remained member of National Modaraba Board (1995–1998), Law and Justice Commission of Pakistan (2001–2004), Evacuee Trust Property Board (2004–2007). He remained Provincial Minister of Law and Justice of Punjab(1996–1997) and Federal Minister of Law and Parliamentary Affairs (2007–2008). He remained Justice of Federal Shariat Court from 2008 to 2011. He became Chairman PCB (Pakistan Cricket Board) in 2018.

Haider authored several English and Urdu publications on Imam Khomeini, the Bhutto Trial, the Shariat Bill, Rehmatu-ul-Lil Alameen, F.I.R and many more. He was a faculty member of Qauid-Azam-Law College, Lahore.

He played an active role in the Movement For Restoration of Democracy(MRD) against Zia-ul-Haq's dicatorship. He was also imprisoned multiple times by Zia regime. He closely witnessed Bhutto's trial and wrote a famous book named "Bhutto Trial".

== Anand Karaj Act ==
Syed Afzal Haider was actively involved in the passage of the Sikh Marriage Ordinance of 2008 (also known as the 'Anand Karaj Act'). This ordinance marked Pakistan as being the first country in the world where Sikhs could get their marriages registered, based on their religion.

== Judgments ==
On March 26, 2008, Syed Afzal Haider, took oath as judge of the Federal Shariat Court of Pakistan. In 2010, he gave an infamous verdict in Mian Abdur Razzaq Aamir v. Federal Government, holding sections of the Women's Protection Act of 2006 unconstitutional. The decision gave an expansive definition of the term "Hudood" in the Constitution, and asserted the Federal Shariat Court's "exclusive jurisdiction" over matters not just consisting of Hudood, but also "relating to" Hudood. This definition of Hudood includes Tazir as well. The advocates of the Women's Protection Act have argued that the judgment has dismantled the Act's legal reforms.

== Death ==
He died on 18 November 2022, at the age of 91.His funeral was led by Allama Muhammad Shafi Najfi at Imambargah Mohammadi Masjid, Gulberg lll, Lahore.

== See also ==
- Federal Shariat Court of Pakistan
- Sikhism in Pakistan
- Shia Islam in Pakistan
- Riffat Hassan
