= Shehram Sarwar Chaudhary =

Justice of the Lahore High Court
- Incumbent
- Assumed office 8 June 2015

Personal details
- Born: 24 April 1965 (age 61)

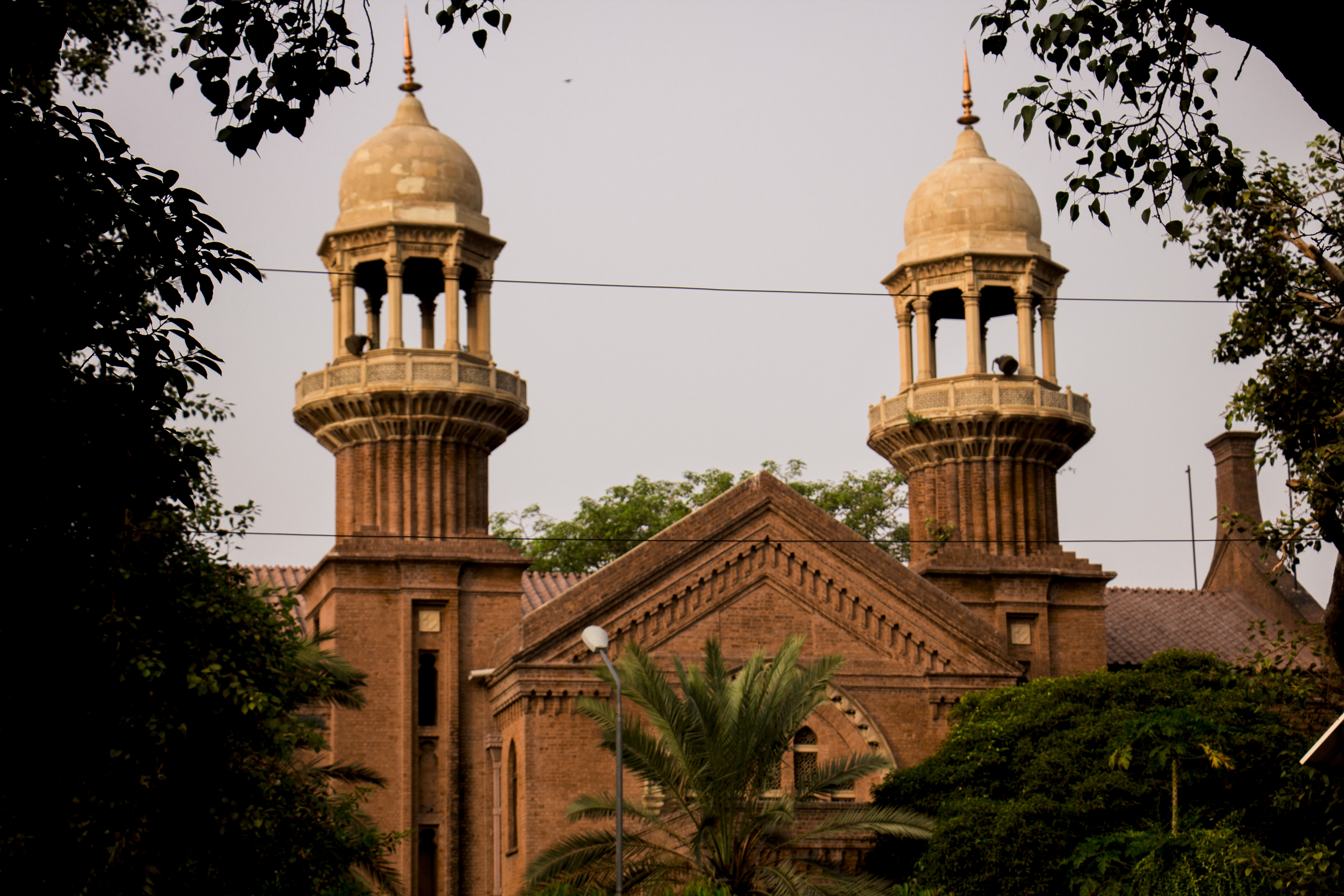
Lahore High Court

Shehram Sarwar Chaudhary (born 24 April 1965) is a Pakistani jurist who has been a Justice of the Lahore High Court since 8 June 2015.
