= Sultan Tanvir Ahmed =

Justice of the Lahore High Court

- سلطان تنویر احمد

Justice of the Lahore High Court
- Incumbent
- Assumed office 7 May 2021

Personal details
- Born: 28 August 1973 (age 53)

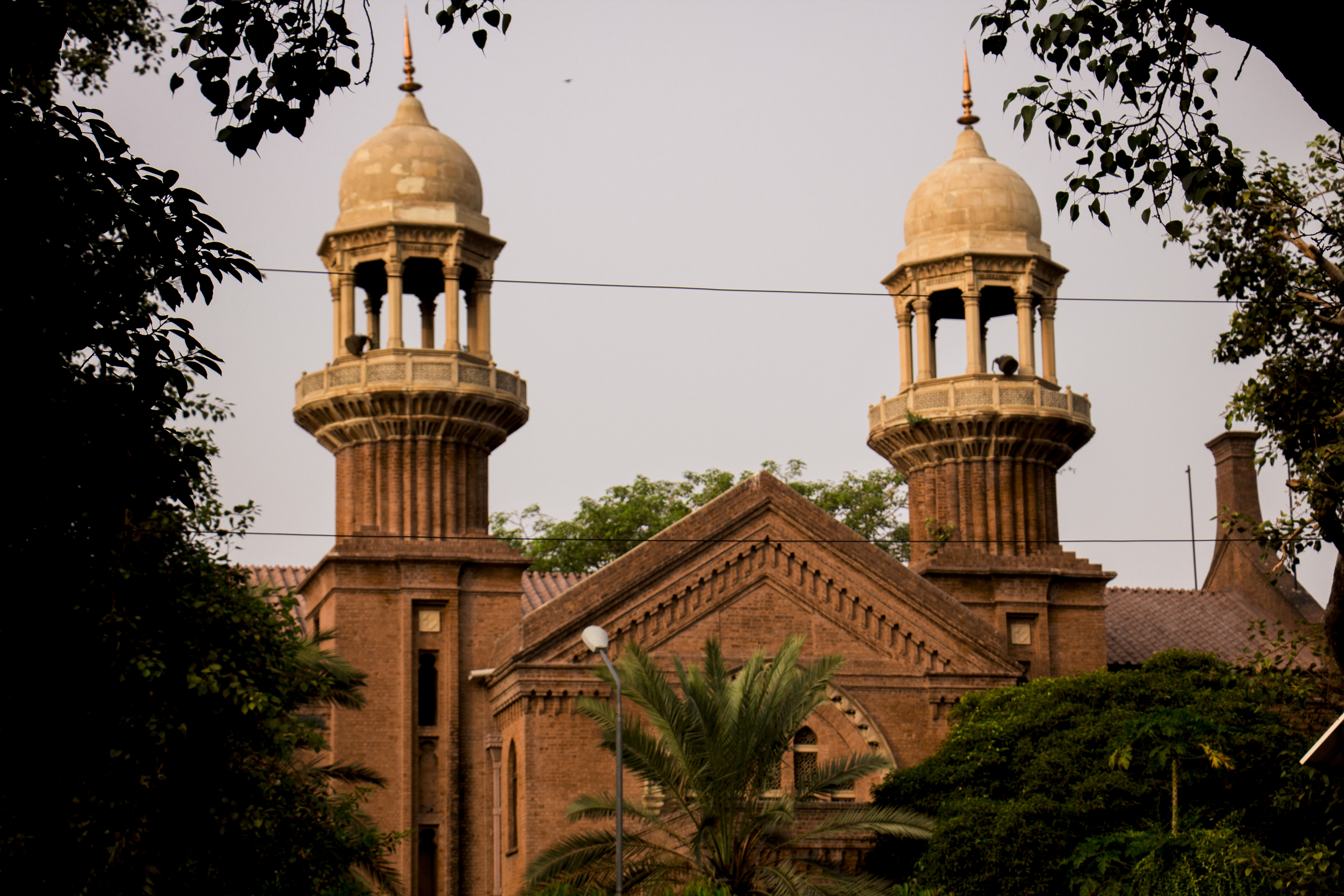
Lahore High Court

Sultan Tanvir Ahmed (Urdu: سلطان تنویر احمد, born 28 August 1973), is a Pakistani jurist and has been serving as a Justice at the Lahore High Court since 7 May 2021.

== Career ==
Sultan was appointed as an additional justice of the Lahore High Court (LHC) on 7 May 2021. The Judicial Commission of Pakistan, led by then Chief Justice of Pakistan Umar Ata Bandial, officially ratified his appointment as a permanent judge of LHC on 13 October 2022. He formally took the oath of office as a permanent judge of LHC on 4 November 2022.
