= Khawaja Muhammad Sharif =

Pakistani judge (1949–2018)

Khawaja Muhammad Sharif خواجہ محمد شریف

39th Chief Justice Lahore High Court
- In office 13 April 2009 – 8 December 2010
- Nominated by: President Asif Ali Zardari
- Preceded by: Sayed Zahid Hussain
- Succeeded by: Ijaz Ahmad Chaudhry

Justice Lahore High Court
- In office 21 May 1998 – 12 April 2009
- Nominated by: President Mohammad Rafiq Tarar

Personal details
- Born: 9 December 1949 Lahore, Pakistan
- Died: 5 November 2021 (aged 71) Lahore, Pakistan

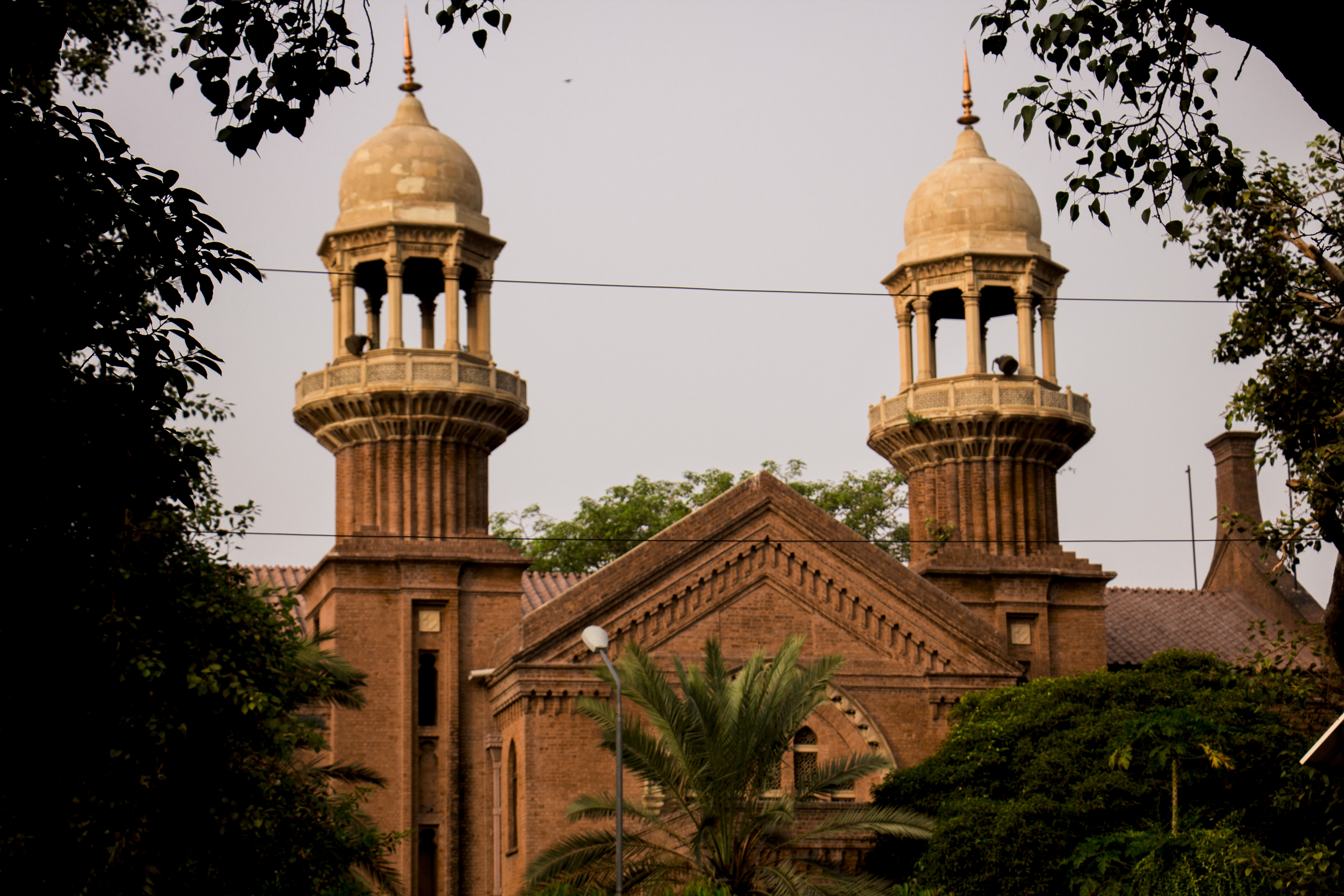
Lahore High Court

Khawaja Muhammad Sharif (Urdu: خواجہ محمد شریف; 9 December 1949 – 5 November 2018) was a Pakistani judge who served as Chief Justice of Lahore High Court from 13 April 2009 to 8 December 2010.

== Life ==
Sharif was born on 9 December 1949, in Lahore. His father Khawaja Muhammad Sadiq was a cloth merchant at Anarkali Bazaar, Lahore. Sharif passed M.A. in Political Science and got an LL.B. degree. He got diplomas in taxation law and labour law.

== Professional career ==
Sharif commenced practice in the legal profession on 7 April 1971 from the office of Khawaja Sultan Ahmad, the most Senior Advocate of Supreme Court of Pakistan and High Court and enrolled as an Advocate of Lahore High Court, Lahore on 24 May 1973.

He was elected twice as President of Lahore Bar Association , in the years 1989 and 1991. During practice he wrote seven law books, six published by Mansoor Book Depot, Lahore which are Motor Accident Claims, Press and Publication Ordinance, Arbitration Act, Company Law, West Pakistan Civil Courts Ordinance and Law of Torts and the seventh book is Manual of Local Bodies Elections Laws with Rules, published by Shah Book Corporation, Lahore.

He, being the President of Lahore Bar Association, represented Pakistan at the time of formation of SAARC Law Association in Sri Lanka in October 1991. He was one of signatories to the charter of SAARC Law Association at Colombo, Sri Lanka. He also visited Malaysia, Philippines and England in his private capacity and wrote 'Safar Nama' in the shape of a book known as 'Shakh-e-Nazuk Key Aashianey'.

He remained Advocate General Punjab from May 1997 till 20 May 1998, when he was appointed to Lahore High Court.

He was one of the few judges, sacked on 3 November 2007 after the enforcement of martial law by Pervez Musharraf, who were reinstated to their positions without taking a fresh or PCO Oath on 17 March 2009.

Sharif was appointed Chief Justice of Lahore High Court on 12 April 2009 and retired on 8 December 2010 on attaining the age of superannuation.

Although already retired, Sharif participated in the defence of Mumtaz Qadri after his assassination of Punjab governor Salman Taseer in a high-profile, controversial case in 2011.

== Death ==
Sharif died on 5 November 2021, in Lahore, at age 68.

== Bibliography ==
- Sharif, Khawaja Muhammad (2012). Shakh-e-Nazuk kay Ashiyanay [Nests built on a weak branch].

== See also ==
- Lahore High Court
- Punjab Bar Council
