= Sayed Zahid Hussain =

Pakistani judge (born 1949)

Sayed Zahid Hussain سید زاہد حسین

Justice of the Supreme Court of Pakistan
- In office 13 April 2009 – 24 February 2011
- Nominated by: Asif Ali Zardari

37th Chief Justice of the Lahore High Court
- In office 1 January 2008 – 12 April 2009
- Nominated by: Pervez Musharraf
- Preceded by: Iftikhar Hussain Chaudhry
- Succeeded by: Khawaja Muhammad Sharif

Justice of the Lahore High Court
- In office 21 May 1998 – 31 December 2007
- Nominated by: Mohammad Rafiq Tarar

Personal details
- Born: December 15, 1949
- Died: 5 November 2020 (aged 70) Lahore, Pakistan

Supreme Court of Pakistan

Sayed Zahid Hussain (Urdu: سید زاہد حسین) is a former judge of the Supreme Court of Pakistan and a former chief justice of the Lahore High Court. He also served as Chairman of the Federal Service Tribunal, and later as a law consultant to the President of Pakistan to hear the appeals against order of the Federal Ombudsman.

He also served as a member of the Syndicates of the University of the Punjab and the University of Engineering and Technology, Lahore, as well as a member of the Board of the Lahore University of Management Sciences.

== Life ==
Sayed Zahid Hussain was born on 15 December 1949 in village Chak Qazian of district Narowal. He acquired his primary education from the local village school and matriculation from G.D. Islamia High School Meingri. He obtained his LL.B degree from Punjab University.

== Professional career ==
Hussain enrolled as an advocate on 22 September 1972. He enrolled as advocate of Lahore High Court on 22 May 1975 and as advocate of Supreme Court of Pakistan on 21 June 1986. He also enrolled as advocate of the Supreme Court of Azad Jammu & Kashmir on 11 October 1997.

He was a life member of Lahore Bar Association, Lahore High Court Bar Association and Supreme Court Bar Association of Pakistan.

Hussain mostly practised on constitutional, and civil sides of law. He also had been a visiting lecturer for some time in the Punjab Law College and City Law College. Hussain was legal advisor for various organisations, including Associated Press of Pakistan (APP). He was a member of Zafar Law Associates, a law firm established by Mr. S.M Zafar, a former law minister. He also contributed in the preparation of celebrated book titled "Understanding Statutes", The Cannons of construction (1997).

He had also been remained a company judge at the LHC, member committee for revision of High Court, member election tribunal, member LHC administration committee, chairman enrolment committee of the Punjab Bar Council and member of the Committee for Recruitment of additional District and Sessions Judges.

Hussain was appointed judge of the Lahore High Court on 21 May 1998 and was confirmed on 19 May 1999.

Hussain was made chief justice of the Lahore High Court on retirement of Justice Iftikhar Hussain Chaudhry, who retired on 31 December 2007. Justice Zahid was the 37th chief justice of LHC since its inception in 1866.

He was elevated to Supreme Court of Pakistan on 12 April 2009 and took oath on 13 April 2009.

He resigned from the Supreme Court of Pakistan on 24 February 2011.

== Controversies ==
=== PCO Oath 1999 ===
Justice Syed Zahid Hussain took oath on Provisional Constitutional Order 1999 as a sitting judge of Lahore High Court.

=== PCO Oath 2007 ===
On 3 November 2007, Chief of Army Staff in Pakistan declared emergency and issued a Provisional Constitutional Order. A seven-member panel of Supreme Court of Pakistan, headed by Chief Justice Chief Justice Iftikhar Mohammad Chaudhry and consisting of Justice Rana Bhagwandas, Justice Javed Iqbal, Justice Mian Shakirullah Jan, Justice Nasir-ul-Mulk, Justice Raja Muhammad Fayyaz Ahmad, and Justice Ghulam Rabbani Judge Supreme Court, issued an order that declared the declaration of emergency as illegal and prohibited all judges to take oath on any PCO.

Justice Syed Zahid Hussain took his oath on Provisional Constitutional Order 2007 as a sitting judge of Lahore High Court. He was among 13 out of 31 sitting judges of Lahore High Court who took oath on PCO. Along with him Nasim Sikandar, Mohammad Khalid Alvi, Sakhi Hussain Bokhari, Muhammad Bilal Khan, Mohammad Muzammal Khan, Syed Shabbar Raza Rizvi, Hamid Ali Shah, Tariq Shamim, Syed Asghar Haider, Hasnat Ahmad Khan and Justice Fazl-e-Miran Chohan as well as then Chief Justice of Lahore High Court Iftikhar Hussain Chaudhry took oath on PCO 2007. As on 19 April 2009, the PCO has not been given protection by any constitutional amendment. In the past, all PCO were at a later point given constitutional protection.

== See also ==
- Lahore High Court
- Supreme Court of Pakistan
