= Sardar Muhammad Shamim Khan =

Pakistani jurist (born 1958)

- سردار محمد شمیم خان

48th Chief Justice of Lahore High Court
- In office 1 January 2019 – 31 December 2019
- Preceded by: Muhammad Anwaarul Haq
- Succeeded by: Mamoon Rashid Sheikh

Senior Justice of Lahore High Court
- In office 23 October 2018 – 31 December 2018
- Preceded by: Muhammad Anwaarul Haq
- Succeeded by: Mamoon Rashid Sheikh

Justice of Lahore High Court
- In office 19 February 2010 – 31 December 2019

Personal details
- Born: 1 January 1958 (age 68)

Sardar Muhammad Shamim Khan (Urdu: سردار محمد شمیم خان; born 1 January 1958) is a Pakistani jurist and retired judge. He served as the 48th Chief Justice of Lahore High Court from 1 January 2019 to 31 December 2019.

Legal offices
Preceded by Muhammad Anwaarul Haq	48th Chief Justice of Lahore High Court	Succeeded by Mamoon Rashid Sheikh
