= Bajwat Wildlife Sanctuary =

Wildlife sanctuary in Pakistan

Coordinates: 32°41′N 74°33′E

The Bajwat Wildlife Sanctuary in Pakistan protects a complex of natural riverine habitats along the Chenab River and two of its tributaries, extending up to the border with India. Its total area of 5,400 hectares (13,000 acres) provides protection for waterfowl, as well as a variety of mammals including hog deer and nilgai. Scientists have recorded 110 species of birds on the site. The most common are species of the family Motacillidae. The sanctuary is in the Sialkot District.

== Fauna ==
List of fauna found in the sanctuary.

#	Name	Scientific name	Status	Residential status
1	Little grebe	Tachybaptus ruficollis	Scarce	Resident
2	Great cormorant	Phalacrocorax carbo	Rare	Winter visitor
3	Little cormorant	Microcarbo niger	Common	Year round visitor
4	Little egret	Egretta garzetta	Abundant	Resident
5	Intermediate egret	Ardea intermedia	Scarce	Year round visitor
6	Great egret	Ardea alba	Vagrant	Winter visitor
7	Grey heron	Ardea cinerea	Scarce	Winter visitor
8	Indian pond heron	Ardeola grayii	Abundant	Resident
9	Cattle egret	Bubulcus ibis	Common	Resident
10	Black-crowned night heron	Nycticorax nycticorax	Rare	Summer visitor
11	Black stork	Ciconia nigra	Vagrant	Winter visitor
12	Bar-headed goose	Anser indicus	Common	Winter Visitor
13	Northern pintail	Anas acuta	Scarce	Winter visitor
14	Mallard	Anas platyrhynchos	Abundant	Winter visitor
15	Eurasian wigeon	Mareca penelope	Common	Winter visitor
16	Gadwall	Anasstrepera	Common	Winter visitor
17	Garganey	Anasquerquedula	Abundant	Winter visitor
18	Northern shoveler	Anasclypeata	Scarce	Winter visitor
19	Indian spot-billed duck	Anaspoecilorhyncha	Rare	Summer visitor
20	Eurasian teal	Anas crecca	Scarce	Winter visitor
21	Common pochard	Aythyaferina	Common	Winter visitor
22	Tufted duck	Aythya fuligula	Rare	Winter visitor
23	Ferruginous duck	Aythya nyroca	Abundant	Winter visitor
24	Ruddy shelduck	Tadorna ferruginea	Common	Winter visitor
25	Common shelduck	Tadorna tadorna	Scarce	Winter visitor
26	White-rumped vulture	Gyps bengalensis	Common	Resident
27	Indian vulture	Gyps indicus	Rare	Year round visitor
28	Black-winged kite	Elanus caeruleus	Scarce	Resident
29	Black kite	Milvusmigrans	Common	Resident
30	Western marsh harrier	Circus aeruginosus	Rare	Winter visitor
31	Shikra	Accipiter badius	Rare	Resident
32	Black francolin	Francolinus francolinus	Frequent	Resident
33	Grey francolin	Ortygornis pondicerianus	Common	Resident
34	White-breasted waterhen	Amaurornis phoenicurus	Frequent	Resident
35	Common moorhen	Gallinula chloropus	Common	Resident
36	Eurasian coot	Fulica atra	Scarce	Winter visitor
37	Western swamphen	Porphyrio porphyrio	Common	Resident
38	Pheasant-tailed jacana	Hydrophasianus chirurgus	Rare	Summer visitor
39	Red-wattled lapwing	Vanellus indicus	Abundant	Resident
40	Northern lapwing	Vanellus vanellus	Scarce	Winter visitor
41	Common snipe	Gallinago gallinago	Rare	Winter visitor
42	Little stint	Calidris minuta	Scarce	Winter visitor
43	Common sandpiper	Actitis hypoleucos	Common	Resident
44	Common redshank	Tringa totanus	Rare	Winter visitor
45	Common greenshank	Tringa nebularia	Rare	Winter visitor
46	Eurasian curlew	Numenius arquata	Rare	Winter visitor
47	Black-winged stilt	Himantopus himantopus	Rare	Summer visitor
48	Small pratincole	Glareola lactea	Scarce	Summer visitor
50	Black-headed gull	Chroicocephalus ridibundus	Rare	Winter visitor
51	River tern	Sterna aurantia	Common	Resident
52	Eurasian collared dove	Streptopelia decaocto	Abundant	Resident
53	Laughing dove	Spilopelia senegalensis	Abundant	Resident
54	Red collared dove	Streptopelia tranquebarica	Common	Summer visitor
55	Spotted dove	Spilopelia chinensis	Scarce	Winter visitor
56	Rock dove	Columba livia	Frequent	Resident
57	Rose-ringed parakeet	Psittacula krameri	Abundant	Resident
58	Asian koel	Eudynamys scolopaceus	Common	Summer visitor
59	Greater coucal	Centropus sinensis	Rare	Resident
60	Jacobin cuckoo	Clamator jacobinus	Rare	Summer visitor
61	Common hawk-cuckoo	Hierococcyx varius	Scarce	Summer visitor
62	Indian cuckoo	Cuculus micropterus	Rare	Summer visitor
63	Little swift	Apus affinis	Frequent	Resident
64	White-throated kingfisher	Halcyon smyrnensis	Common	Resident
65	Pied kingfisher	Ceryle rudis	Common	Resident
66	Common kingfisher	Alcedo atthis	Frequent	Resident
67	Asian green bee-eater	Merops orientalis	Common	Summer visitor
68	Blue-cheeked bee-eater	Merops persicus	Common	Summer visitor
69	Eurasian hoopoe	Upupa epops	Common	Resident
70	Indian roller	Coracias benghalensis	Common	Resident
71	Black-rumped flameback	Dinopium benghalense	Scarce	Resident
72	Yellow-crowned woodpecker	Leiopicus mahrattensis	Rare	Resident
73	Oriental skylark	Alauda gulgula	Common	Resident
74	Eurasian skylark	Alauda arvensis	Rare	Winter visitor
75	Greater short-toed lark	Calandrella brachydactyla	Rare	Winter visitor
76	Crested lark	Galerida cristata	Common	Resident
77	Streak-throated swallow	Hirundo fluvicola	Frequent	Resident
78	Wire-tailed swallow	Hirundo smithii	Scarce	Summer visitor
79	Western house martin	Delichon urbicum	Rare	Summer visitor
80	Sand martin	Riparia riparia	Common	Resident
81	Paddyfield pipit	Anthus rufulus	Rare	Resident
82	White wagtail	Motacilla alba	Common	Resident
83	White-browed wagtail	Motacilla maderaspatensis	Common	Resident
84	Western yellow wagtail	Motacilla flava	Common	Winter visitor
85	Citrine wagtail	Motacilla citreola	Scarce	Winter visitor
86	Grey wagtail	Motacilla cinerea	Scare	Winter visitor
87	Red-vented bulbul	Pycnonotus cafer	Abundant	Resident
88	Long-tailed shrike	Lanius schach	Frequent	Resident
89	Bay-backed shrike	Lanius vittatus	Frequent	Resident
90	Oriental magpie-robin	Copsychus saularis	Frequent	Year round visitor
91	Pied bush chat	Saxicola caprata	Common	Resident
92	Common babbler	Argya caudata	Common	Resident
93	Jungle babbler	Argya striata	Frequent	Resident
94	Large grey babbler	Argya malcolmi	Rare	Resident
95	Purple sunbird	Cinnyris asiaticus	Scarce	Summer visitor
96	Scaly-breasted munia	Lonchura punctulata	Scarce	Year round visitor
97	Baya weaver	Ploceus philippinus	Frequent	Resident
98	Black-breasted weaver	Ploceus benghalensis	Scarce	Resident
99	Streaked weaver	Ploceus manyar	Frequent	Resident
100	Yellow-throated sparrow	Gymnoris xanthocollis	Vagrant	Summer visitor
101	House sparrow	Passer domesticus	Abundant	Resident
102	Brahminy starling	Sturnia pagodarum	Frequent	Summer visitor
103	Indian pied myna	Gracupica contra	Common	Summer visitor
104	Common starling	Sturnus vulgaris	Common	Winter visitor
105	Bank myna	Acridotheres ginginianus	Common	Resident
106	Common myna	Acridotheres tristis	Abundant	Resident
107	Eurasian golden oriole	Oriolus oriolus	Frequent	Summer visitor
108	House crow	Corvus splendens	Abundant	Resident
109	Large-billed crow	Corvus macrorhynchos	Common	Winter visitor
110	Rook	Corvus frugilegus	Scarce	Winter visitor
111	Black drongo	Dicrurus macrocercus	Common	Resident
