= Muhammad Qasim Khan =

Muhammad Qasim Khan محمد قاسم خان
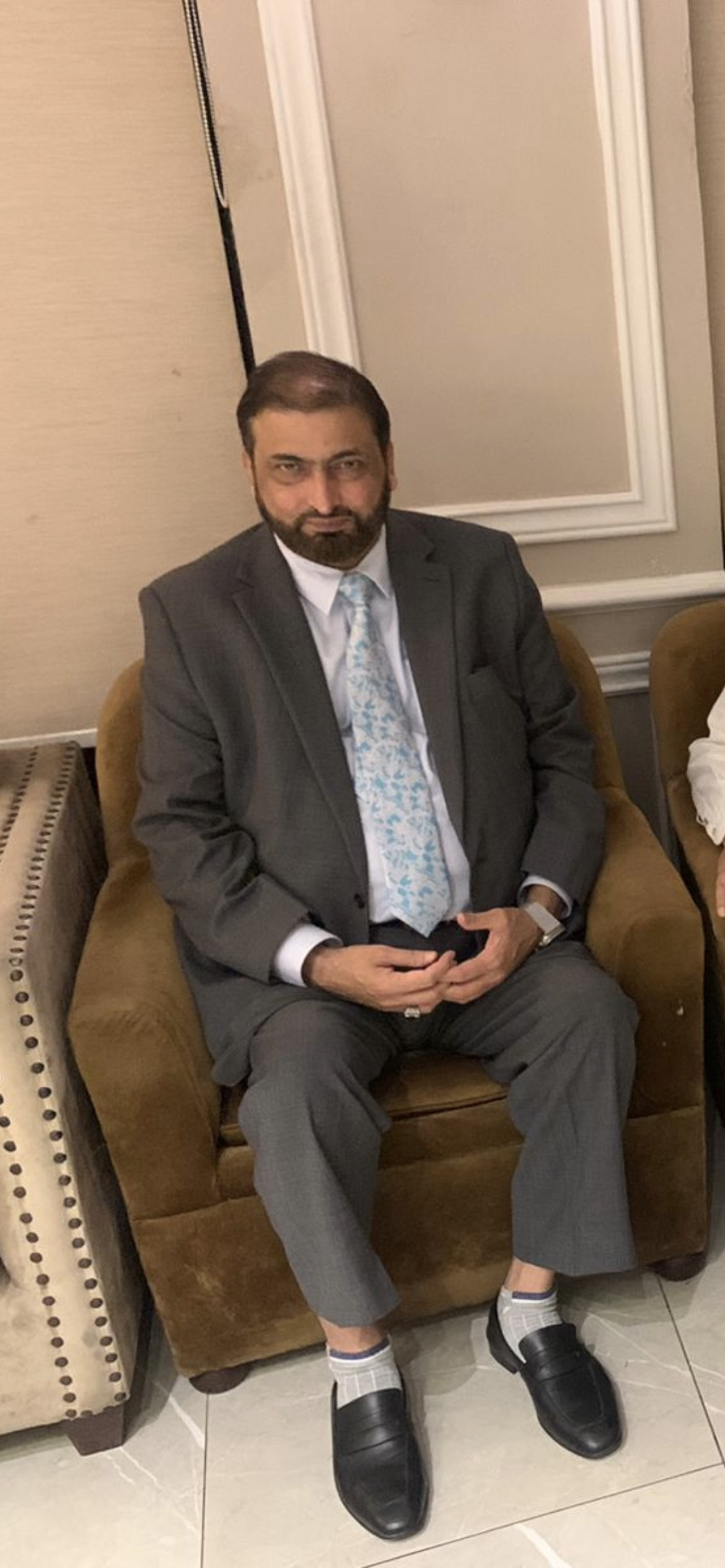

50th Chief Justice of the Lahore High Court
- In office 19 March 2020 – 6 July 2021
- Preceded by: Mamoon Rashid Sheikh
- Succeeded by: Muhammad Ameer Bhatti

Justice of the Lahore High Court
- In office 19 February 2010 – 18 March 2020

Personal details
- Born: 6 July 1959 (age 67)

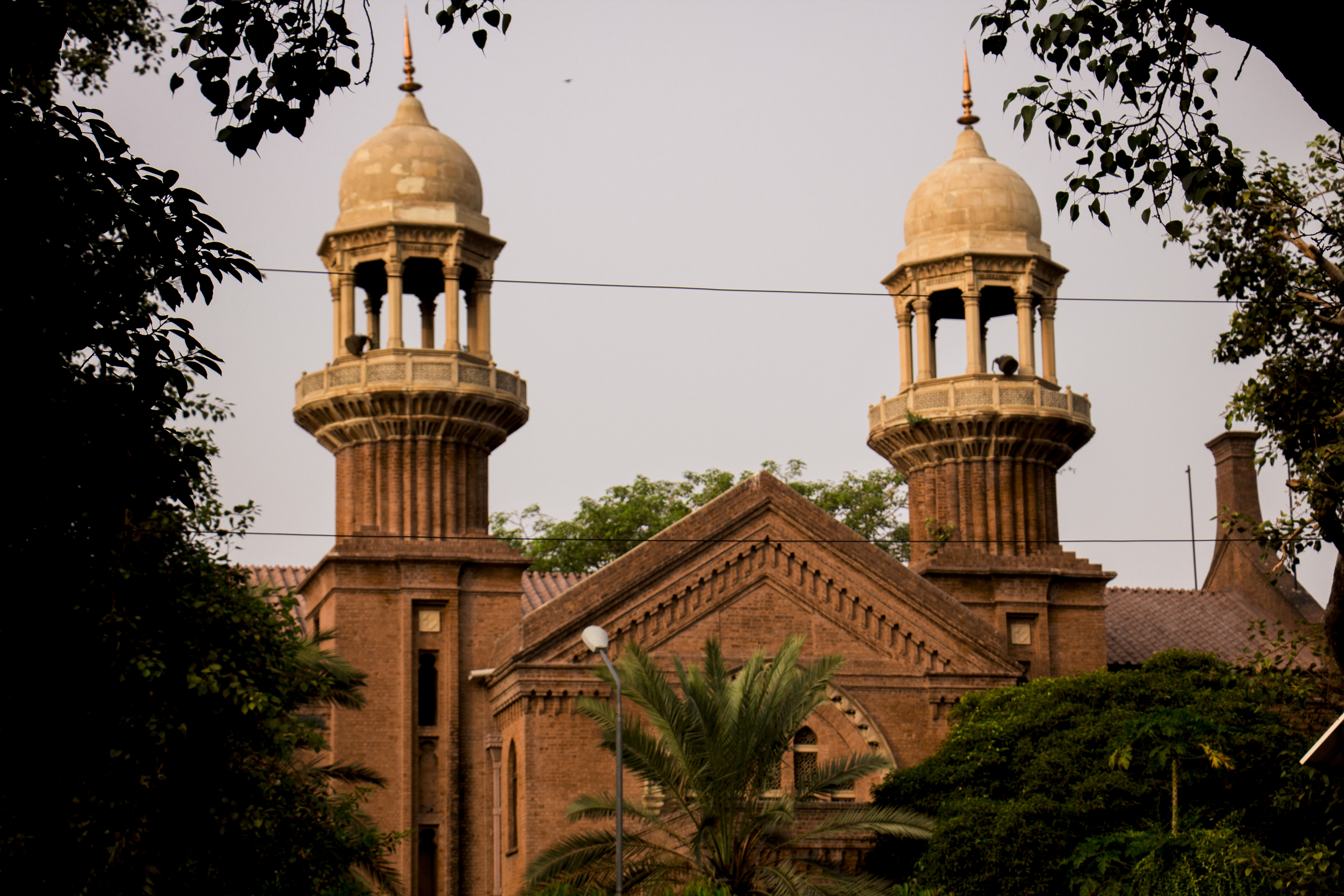
Lahore High Court

Muhammad Qasim Khan (Urdu: محمد قاسم خان; born 6 July 1959) is a Pakistani jurist who served as the 50th Chief Justice of the Lahore High Court from 19 March 2020 to 5 July 2021. He was appointed by President Arif Alvi. He retired on 6 July 2021.

Legal offices
Preceded by Mamoon Rashid Sheikh	50th Chief Justice of Lahore High Court	Succeeded by TBD
