= Muhammad Asif Bajwa (politician) =

Pakistani politician

Member of the Provincial Assembly of the Punjab
- In office 29 May 2013 – 31 May 2018

Personal details
- Born: 1 January 1964 (age 62) Sialkot
- Party: Pakistan Muslim League (Nawaz)

Muhammad Asif Bajwa is a Pakistani politician who was a Member of the Provincial Assembly of the Punjab, from May 2013 to May 2018.

== Early life and education ==
He was born on 1 January 1964 in Sialkot.

He has the degree of Bachelor of Arts and the degree of Bachelor of Laws. He has the degree of Doctor of Philosophy in Law which he received in 2016 and has the degree of Master of Philosophy in Law which he obtained in 2012. He also received the degree of Master of Laws in 2007 from University of Karachi.

== Political career ==
He was elected to the Provincial Assembly of the Punjab as a candidate of Pakistan Muslim League (Nawaz) from Constituency PP-130 (Sialkot-X) in the 2013 Pakistani general election.

== Personal career and interests ==
Mr Muhammad Asif Bajwa, Advocate son of Mr Muhammad Saeed was born on January 1, 1964, in Sialkot. He did his PhD (Law) in 2016 and obtained the degree of M.Phil (Law) in 2012 and Master of Laws (LL.M) in 2007 from the University of Karachi, Karachi. An advocate, an agriculturist and a businessman, who has been elected as Member, Provincial Assembly of Punjab in general elections 2013. He has served as General Secretary, Bar Association Daska during 2003-04 and as President during 2011-12. To his credit, he has publication cum-LLM thesis titled “Qanoon-e-Shahadat and False Evidence” published in 2007. He has visited Saudi Arabia, France, Italy, Belgium, Spain, the UK, Germany and the UAE.

== Positions held in external bodies ==
ORGANIZATION POST TENURE

1 - Daska Bar Association - General Secretary - 2003-2004 2 - Daska Bar Association - President - 2011-2012 3 - Civil Club Daska - General Secretary - 2003-04, 2005–06 4 - Civil Club, Daska - Vice President - 2006-07 5 - Daska Engineering & Industrial Association President - 2012-13 6 - Daska Engineering & Industrial Association President - 2013-14

== Permanent contact ==
House No.196, Model Town Daska, District Sialkot 052-6611535 (Work), 0300-8746535 (Mobile)

== Visits to other countries ==
COUNTRY PURPOSE OF VISIT YEAR Belgium To attend Lawyer's Conference 2008 France To attend Lawyer's Conference 2010 Germany To attend Lawyer's Conference 2007 Italy To attend Lawyer's Conference 2010 Saudi Arabia Hajj, Umrah 2011, 2012, 2015, 2016 Spain To attend Lawyer's Conference 2008 United Arab Emirates Private Tour 2007, 2016 The United Kingdom To attend Lawyer's Conference 2008, 2016
