= Mansoor Ali Shah =

Ex Chief Justice of Pakistan

Syed Mansoor Ali Shah سید منصور علی شاہ
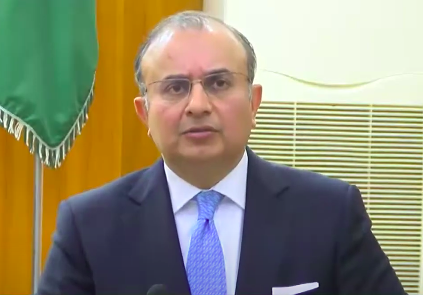
- Shah in 2017

Acting Chief Justice of Pakistan
- In office 21 April 2025 – 28 April 2025

Justice of the Supreme Court of Pakistan
- In office 7 February 2018 – 13 November 2025
- Appointed by: Mamnoon Hussain

45th Chief Justice of the Lahore High Court
- In office 27 June 2016 – 6 February 2018
- Appointed by: Rafique Rajwana
- Preceded by: Ijaz-ul-Ahsan
- Succeeded by: Yawar Ali Khan

Justice of the Lahore High Court
- In office 15 September 2009 – 27 June 2016
- Appointed by: Salmaan Taseer

Personal details
- Born: 28 November 1962 (age 63) Peshawar, Pakistan
- Education: Aitchison College; University of Cambridge; University of the Punjab

Syed Mansoor Ali Shah (Urdu: سید منصور علی شاہ; born 28 November 1962) is a Pakistani jurist. He served as the Senior Puisne Judge of the Supreme Court of Pakistan until 2025. On 13 November 2025, Shah resigned from the Supreme Court in protest over the passage of the 27th constitutional amendment. On the next day, President Asif Ali Zardari accepted his resignation. He formerly served as the 45th Chief Justice of the Lahore High Court from 2016 till 2018.

Justice Shah previously served as the acting Chief Justice of Pakistan from 21 April 2025 to 28 April 2025.

== Early life and education ==
Shah was born on 28 November 1962, in Peshawar.

He received his education at Aitchison College, where he studied from 1968 to 1981. In 1984, he obtained a Bachelor of Arts (B.A.) in Mathematics and French from the University of the Punjab. He then enrolled at the Punjab University Law College, where he completed his Bachelor of Laws (LL.B.) degree between 1986 and 1988. In 1988, he received a Master of Arts (M.A.) in Economics from the University of the Punjab. From 1989 to 1991, he studied at Downing College, Cambridge, where he earned a Bachelor of Arts (B.A.) and a Master of Arts (M.A.) in Law.

== Career ==
Shah commenced his legal practice in 1991. He was a founding partner of Afridi, Shah and Minallah, a law firm established in 1997 alongside Yahya Afridi and Athar Minallah. He was actively involved in the 2007 Lawyers' Movement. As a lawyer, he represented clients in over 2,000 cases.

=== Justice of the Lahore High Court ===
He was appointed as a judge of the Lahore High Court (LHC) on 15 September 2009 and took an oath as an additional judge, along with 11 others, for a one-year term. The appointment was made by President Asif Ali Zardari. At the time of his elevation, Shah was recognized for his significant contributions to addressing environmental pollution.

In February 2011, the Parliamentary Committee on Judges extended Shah's service as an additional judge of the LHC.

In April 2012, then LHC Chief Justice Azmat Saeed established Green Benches to hear cases related to environmental issues and Shah was appointed to the Green Single Bench to hear writ petitions related to environmental issues in the province.

In November 2014, he urged the federal government of Pakistan to dismiss Maryam Nawaz from her position as Chairwoman of the Prime Minister's Youth Programme, stating that her appointment should have adhered to due legal processes. He indicated that the LHC would issue an appropriate order if the matter was not addressed, leading to Maryam's subsequent resignation. Following this, many questioned Shah’s chances of becoming Chief Justice of the Lahore High Court, given that the PML-N was in power both in Punjab and at the federal level.

In November 2015, he became the senior puisne judge of the LHC after Ijazul Ahsan was sworn in as the 44th Chief Justice of the LHC.

In April 2016, he was praised for his efforts in environmental protection at the first World Environmental Law Congress held in Rio de Janeiro and was also commended for establishing a bench at the LHC dedicated to addressing environmental issues in Punjab.

Since his appointment to the LHC in 2009, he has authored numerous judgments on constitutional law, human rights, administrative law, and environmental sustainability, with many decisions perceived as challenging the Government of Punjab.

=== Chief Justice of the Lahore High Court ===
He was appointed Chief Justice of LHC on 27 June 2016. He took oath as the 45th Chief Justice during a ceremony at the Governor House, where Chief Minister Shahbaz Sharif and Governor Rafique Rajwana officiated the ceremony. Shortly after being sworn in as chief justice, he implemented significant reforms aimed at enhancing self-accountability within the judicial system he oversaw. Following his appointment as Chief Justice of the LHC, Babar Sattar, then a practicing lawyer, remarked, "Someone like him being appointed chief justice of Pakistan's largest province is a miracle," reflecting the belief within the legal community that the Chief Minister of Punjab or Prime Minister would be unlikely to appoint Shah due to his critical stance toward the ruling PML-N party. Babar Sattar also noted, "When you appoint someone who has a reputation of being reform-minded and very independent, he is not going to be somebody who will be amenable to being controlled."

On his first day in office, he issued notifications appointing 30 judicial officers in Punjab as Officer on Special Duty (OSD) due to concerns about their questionable reputations, including three district and sessions judges, six additional district and sessions judges, and 21 civil judges.

He played a key role in establishing Alternate Dispute Resolution Centers in Punjab. He implemented case management and court automation systems at the LHC and district courts of Punjab, and he also founded a research center at the LHC. Additionally, he initiated the first Gender-Based Violence Court and a Child Court in Lahore. He also contributed to the revision of the curriculum at the Punjab Judicial Academy.

In January 2017, the LHC under Shah took the unprecedented step of preparing evaluation reports for its own judges, allowing them to review their performance.

In July 2017, a lawyer filed a petition in the IHC accusing Chief Justice Shah of taking a government loan for his textile mills and his son's medical expenses. In response, Shah offered to disclose details about his family business and his son's treatment costs. He clarified that he had sold the textile mill before becoming a judge and had resigned from any directorial roles. Since his judicial appointment, he had not been involved in any business activities. Subsequently, the IHC dismissed the petition seeking the "money trail" of Shah.

In a December 2017 interview with the BBC Urdu, he mentioned that in Punjab, there is only one judge for every 62,000 individuals. He noted that while the number of cases is rising in the province, the number of judges remains the same. When asked about pressure on the judiciary in Pakistan, he emphasized that, despite the major rulings of the Lahore High Court, there is no external pressure whatsoever.

=== Justice of the Supreme Court ===
In January 2018, the Judicial Commission of Pakistan (JCP) recommended the elevation of Shah to the Supreme Court as a judge.

He was elevated to a judge of the Supreme Court of Pakistan on 7 February 2018 by President Mamnoon Hussain.

Since joining the Supreme Court, Shah has authored decisions on constitutional law, human rights, and environmental sustainability and focused on judicial reform, including the revamping of the Punjab Judicial Academy.

In October 2013, he remarked that generals of Pakistan Armed Forces and judges of constitutional courts were completely accountable under National Accountability Bureau laws and added that Anti-Corruption and accountability laws apply to them just as they do to politicians.

In January 2024, he became the senior most judge and was set to become the next Chief Justice in October 2024, after the retirement of incumbent CJ Isa. This followed by the surprised resignation of senior judge Ijazul Ahsan, who stepped down shortly after Mazahar Ali Akbar Naqvi resigned amid allegations of misconduct. If Ahsan had not resigned, Shah would have assumed the office of Chief Justice in August 2025. Consequently, he became a member of the Supreme Judicial Council of Pakistan and also joined the three member committee of senior-most judges responsible for bench formation.

After the six Islamabad High Court judges' letter was released in March 2024, Shah emphasized the necessity of establishing a firewall around the judicial system, stating that external interference in the judiciary must be avoided and also stated that compromised judges should be removed from the judiciary. The same month, he and several other Supreme Court judges, including the Chief Justice Isa, received letters reportedly containing anthrax powder. This incident took place after the Supreme Court began suo motu proceedings related to the letter from the Islamabad High Court judges.

In his address to the annual Asma Jahangir Conference held in April 2024, he expressed dissatisfaction with the history of the Judiciary of Pakistan, pointing out that "mafias" have been influencing the judicial system. He criticized the global rankings of the Pakistani judiciary and stated that judges who do not fulfill their duties should be removed. He emphasized that there should be no compromise in keeping corrupt and underperforming judges.

In April 2024, reports emerged that the Prime Minister Shahbaz Sharif-led PML-N government might amend the Constitution of Pakistan to eliminate the 65-year age limit for the Chief Justice of Pakistan. This prompted concerns from the legal community, with some arguing that Parliament of Pakistan was not fully representative and lacked the constitutional, democratic, and moral authority to legislate legitimately. In May 2024, amid continued rumors of PML-N led government plans to amend the Constitution to extend Chief Justice Qazi Faiz Isa's tenure, the Pakistan Tehreek-e-Insaf (PTI) announced it would oppose such moves. Isa was set to retire in October 2024, after which Shah, as the Senior Puisne Judge, was expected to take over as Chief Justice.

On 12 July, the Supreme Court delivered its majority verdict on the PTI Reserved seats case. In announcing the decision, Shah stated that the PTI was eligible for the seats in the assemblies reserved for women and minorities. This delivered a significant blow to the ruling coalition led by PML-N. It was observed that Chief Justice Isa's relationship with Shah and Munib Akhtar had become tense following this PTI reserved seats case.

On 14 September 2024, the government formally proposed a constitutional amendment to set the Chief Justice of Pakistan's tenure at three years. However, according to legal experts, the suggested constitutional amendment was aimed to block Shah from taking the position of chief justice. However, the government was unable to reach a consensus with its allies and failed to pass the constitutional amendment by 17 September.

Following which, the All Pakistan Lawyers Convention opposed the notion of any constitutional changes or the creation of a new constitutional court. They called for the immediate issuance of a notification to appoint Shah as the next Chief Justice of Pakistan. On 18 September, Chairman of the Pakistan People's Party Bilawal Bhutto Zardari also expressed his belief that Shah would assume the role of the next chief justice.

On 21 September, the federal government issued a presidential ordinance to amend the Supreme Court's Practice and Procedure Act 2023 to grant the chief justice greater powers. Within hours of the enactment of the amended ordinance, Chief Justice Isa reconstituted the three member committee of senior-most judges by replacing Munib Akhtar with Aminuddin Khan. On 21 September, Shah wrote a letter to the Secretary of the Supreme Court, stating his boycott to attend the judges' committee meeting due to the new ordinance. He expressed his strong objections to the Practice and Procedure Ordinance and referred to the committee as a "one-man show," pointing to the Chief Justice Isa. He also expressed concerns regarding Akhtar's removal from the committee and called for the formation of a full court to address the implications of the newly enacted Practice and Procedure Amendment Ordinance. This letter underscored significant internal tensions among the Supreme Court judges. Imran Khan, while incarcerated, also backed Shah's position on the Practice and Procedure Act and voiced his support for Shah's stance. Following this, Shah also declined to participate in the meeting of the newly formed three member committee of senior-most judges.

On the same day, Shah also released a much-awaited majority detailed verdict on the PTI Reserved seats case, which received praise from legal experts across the country. Legal experts described the verdict in which Shah grilled the ECP as "unprecedented." The PML-N dismissed the judgment as "a political decision." An editorial in Dawn stated, "the government should either file for a review or accept it [read judgment] as is. Refusing to implement it is a dangerous strategy; it may unravel the entire edifice of the state." An Express Tribune editorial also stated "It leaves no option for the government or the ECP but to submit and implement the decision [read judgment] in toto." In his column, journalist Zahid Hussain noted, "THE country seems to be heading towards a constitutional breakdown as state institutions clash within and among themselves."

On 25 September, the Ministry of Law and Justice dismissed rumors about Shah's appointment as the new Chief Justice, calling the circulating notification on social media fake. They stated that the matter is still under review and no final decision has been made. On the same day, Imran Khan expressed his party's full support for Shah's appointment as Chief Justice, urging for an announcement regarding the next Chief Justice's appointment to be made soon. He also claimed that the formation of a constitutional court aims to limit the Chief Justice's power and criticized the government for wanting their own judges to obscure the alleged rigging in the 2024 general election.

As Chief Justice Isa's retirement neared on October 25, with less than ten days remaining, the government had not announced his successor. Reports indicated that the government had been considering constitutional amendments to allow for the appointment of other judges to the position, citing concerns over Shah’s previous rulings in favor of PTI as a potential barrier to his appointment.

Shah is one of the three senior most Supreme Court of Pakistan judges who was considered for appointment as Chief Justice of Pakistan by a 12-member special parliamentary committee on 22 October 2024. The committee, by a majority vote, appointed Justice Yahya Afridi as Chief Justice of Pakistan.

On 13 November 2025, Shah resigned from the Supreme Court in protest over the passage of the 27th constitutional amendment. In his resignation letter, he criticized the amendment, describing it as a serious threat to Pakistan's Constitution. He argued that the amendment weakened judicial independence by subjecting the Supreme Court to executive control, thereby undermining the integrity of the judiciary and damaging the constitutional framework. Shah stated that remaining in a court stripped of its constitutional powers would contradict his oath to protect the Constitution.

== See also ==
- Supreme Court of Pakistan
- Lahore High Court
