= Lahore High Court =

Apex court of the Pakistani province of Punjab

Lahore High Court عدالتِ عالیہ لاہور
- Lahore High Court logo

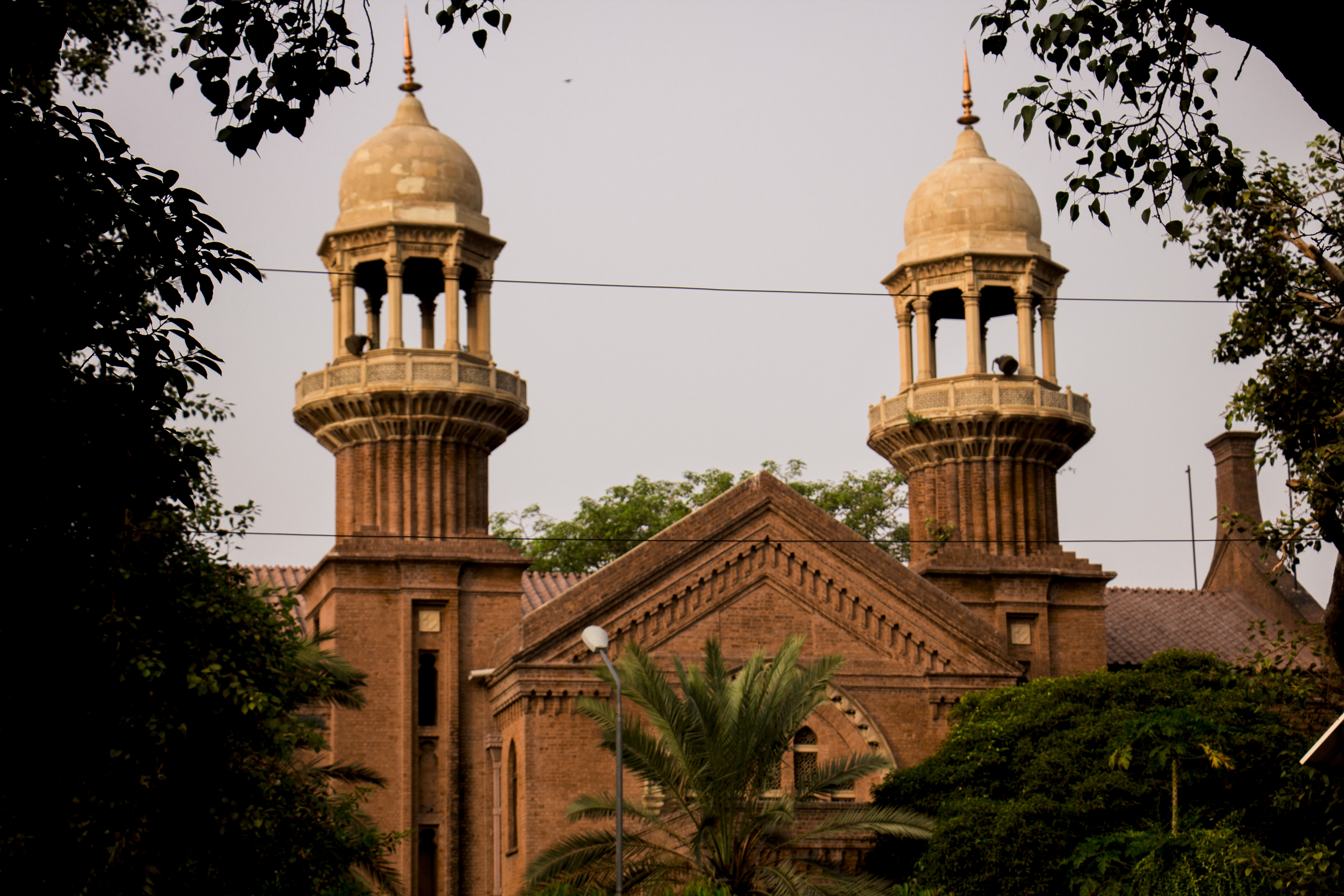
- Lahore High Court Building
- Established: 21 March 1882; 144 years ago
- Jurisdiction: Punjab
- Location: Principal Seat: Lahore; Circuit Benches: Bahawalpur; Multan; Rawalpindi
- Composition method: Judicial Commission of Pakistan
- Authorised by: Constitution of Pakistan
- Appeals to: Supreme Court of Pakistan
- Appeals from: District Courts of Punjab
- Judge term length: Till 62 years of age
- Number of positions: 60
- Website: lhc.gov.pk

Chief Justice of Lahore High Court
- Currently: Aalia Neelum
- Since: 11 July 2024

The Lahore High Court (Note: Urdu: عدالتِ عالیہ لاہور, romanized: 'adālat-ē-'ālīyā lāhōr) (LHC) is the highest court and supreme authority in the judiciary of the Pakistani province of Punjab. It has supreme appellate jurisdiction over all provincial cases in Punjab. Established as a high court on 21 March 1882, it is based in Lahore, which is its principal seat; alongside its secondary benches based in Rawalpindi, Multan, and Bahawalpur.

A proposal was sent by lawyers to set up new high court benches in Faisalabad, Sialkot, D.G.Khan and Gujranwala divisions but full court of Lahore High Court turned down this request.

== History ==
=== Creation ===
In 1849, the East India Company defeated the Sikh Empire and assumed control of administration within the Punjab. A Board of Administration was constituted and the Punjab was divided into Divisions, Districts and Tehsils. The Divisions were controlled by Commissioners, Districts by Deputy Commissioners and Tehsils by an Assistant and Extra Assistant Commissioners.

The Board of Administration consisted of Sir Henry Lawrence, John Lawrence and Charles Grenville Mansel.

=== Chief Court of the Punjab Lahore High Court ===
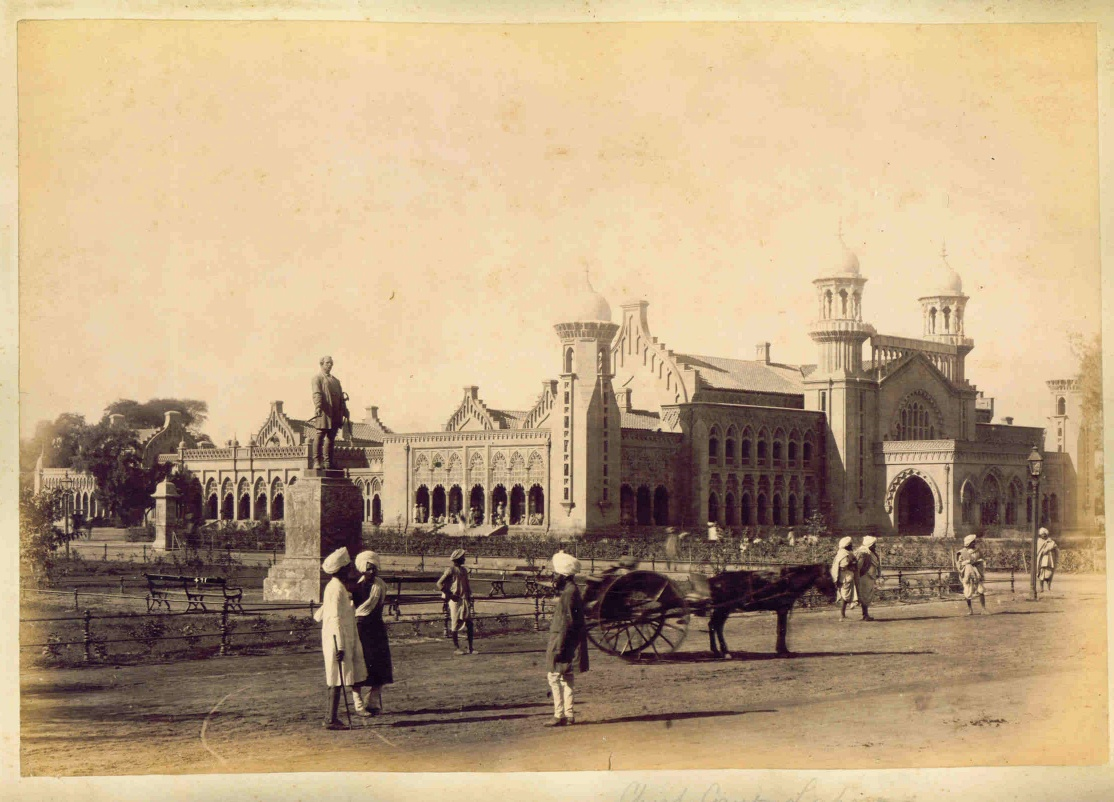
Lahore High Court in the 1880s

In 1858 the Punjab, along with the rest of British India, came under the direct rule of the British crown and decisions with regard to administration and justice were now made under the authority of the monarch, Queen Victoria. By 1864, a proliferation of court cases necessitated an expansion to the judicial structure in the province. The Punjab Courts Act, (XIX of 1865) introduced seven grades of courts, combining judicial and administrative functions and claiming jurisdiction over civil and criminal cases. The Court of Tehsildar was the lowest court, whilst the Court of the Judicial Commissioner became the highest court in the land.

Over time, as appeals to the Chief Court greatly increased, later Acts namely the Punjab Courts Act, (XVII of 1877) and Punjab Courts Act, (XVIII of 1884) repealed earlier Acts and restated the law regarding the courts' constitution, powers and jurisdiction. Additional judges were appointed, and greater finality was granted to the decisions of the lower appellate courts. By 1884, there were four classes of courts subordinate to the Chief Court, namely the Divisional Court, the Court of the District Judge, the Court of the Subordinate Judge, the Court of Munsif.

=== Lahore High Court ===
On 1 October 1882, the Chief Court of the Punjab Court was elevated to the status of a Lahore High Court, becoming known as Lahore High Court, King-Emperor George V also appointed a Chief Justice and six puisne justices, and declared the Court's jurisdiction over the Punjab and Delhi provinces.

The Government of India Act, 1935 removed the barrier that the Chief Justice must be a Barrister Judge and opened the position to Civilian Judges. An age limit of 60 years was set for High Court Judges.

By virtue of the Government of India (High Court Judges) Order, 1937, a maximum number of Judges for the various High Courts in India was fixed. In each case the number so stated was exclusive of the Chief Justice but included all additional judges. For the Lahore High Court the maximum number was fixed at 15.

=== The West Pakistan High Court ===
On 30 September 1955, the Constituent Assembly of Pakistan established the province of West Pakistan, and gave the Governor-General the power to establish the West Pakistan High Court, which was established in 1956. Judges from the Chief Court of Sind and the Judicial Commissioners Court at Peshawar became judges at the West Pakistan High Court.

=== Creation Of Divisional Benches ===
On 1 January 1981, it was ordered that the Lahore High Court would create benches at Bahawalpur, Multan and Rawalpindi. The order also specified that the Lahore High Court judges could hold circuit courts anywhere in the province, with judges nominated by the Lahore High Court Chief Justice.

== Chief Justices ==
The first Chief Justice at Lahore was Sir Henry Meredyth Plowden in 1880. The current Chief Justice is Aalia Neelum, incumbent since 11 July 2024.

== List of chief justices ==
The following table lists all the chief justices to date.

Portrait	Pakistan justice	Took office	Left office	Notes
Chief Court of the Lahore
	Sir Henry Meredyth Plowden	1880	1895	
	Sir Charles Arthur Roe	1895	1898	
	Sir William Ovens Clark	1898	1909	
	Sir Arthur Hay Stewart Reid	1909	1914	
	Sir Alfred Kensington	1914	1915	
	Sir Donald Campbell Johnstone	1915	1917	
	Sir Henry Adolphus Rattigan	1917	1919	
Lahore High Court
	Sir Shadi Lal	1920	1934	First Indian Chief Justice of any High Court in India
	Sir John Douglas Young	1934	1943	
	Sir Arthur Trevor Harries	1943	1946	
	Sir Mian Abdul Rashid	1946	1948	
	Muhammad Munir	1949	1954	
	Sheikh Abdul Rahman	1954	1958	
	Muhammad Rustam Kayani	1958	1962	
	Manzur Qadir	1962	1963	
	Abdul Aziz Khan	1963	1965	
	Inamullah Khan	1965	1967	
	Waheed-ud-Din Ahmad	1967	1969	
	Qadeeruddin Ahmed	1969	1970	
	Sheikh Anwarul Haq	1970	1972	
	Sardar Muhammad Iqbal	1972	1976	
	Aslam Riaz Hussain	1976	1978	
	Maulvi Mushtaq Hussain	1978	1980	
	Shamim Hussain Qadri	1980	1982	
	Javed Iqbal	1982	1986	
	Ghulam Mujaddid Mirza	1986	1988	
	Abdul Shakurul Salam	1988	1989	
	Muhammad Rafiq Tarar	1989	1991	
	Mian Mahboob Ahmad	1991	1995	
	Khalil-Ur-Rehman Khan	1996	1996	
	Sheikh Ijaz Nisar	1996	1997	
	Sheikh Riaz Ahmad	1997	1997	
	Rashid Aziz Khan	1997	2000	
	Mian Allah Nawaz	2000	2000	
	Falak Sher	2000	2002	
	Chaudhry Iftikhar Hussain	2002	2007	
	Sayed Zahid Hussain	2008	2009	
	Khawaja Muhammad Sharif	2009	2010	
	Chaudhry Ijaz Ahmed	2010	2011	
	Azmat Saeed	2011	2012	
	Umar Ata Bandial	2012	2014	
	Imtiaz Ahmad	2014	2015	
	Manzoor Ahmad Malik	2015	2015	
	Ijazul Ahsan	2015	2016	
	Syed Mansoor Ali Shah	2016	2018	
	Muhammad Yawar Ali	2018	2018	
	Muhammad Anwaarul Haq	2018	2018	
	Sardar Muhammad Shamim Khan	2019	2019	
	Mamoon Rashid Sheikh	2020	2020	
	Muhammad Qasim Khan	2020	2021	
	Muhammad Ameer Bhatti	2021	2024	
	Malik Shehzad Ahmed Khan	2024	2024	
	Aalia Neelum	2024	present	

== Current composition ==
Lahore High Court is headed by a Chief Justice. The bench consist of sixty Justices and additional judges. The retirement age of Chief Justice and Justices is 62 years. The Additional Judges are initially appointed for one year. After that, their services could either be extended or they could be confirmed or retired. The current Chief Justice of Lahore High Court is Justice Aalia Neelum and the Court is currently made up of the following Justices (in order of seniority).

No.	Name	Appointment	Retirement	Note(s)
1	Aalia Neelum	12 April 2013	11 November 2028	Chief Justice Since 11 July 2024
2	Abid Aziz Sheikh	12 April 2013	25 April 2029	Senior Puisne Judge Since 23 April 2026
3	Sadaqat Ali Khan	29 October 2013	20 January 2029	
4	Syed Shahbaz Ali Rizvi	22 March 2014	21 April 2028	
5	Faisal Zaman Khan	22 March 2014	30 July 2029	
6	Mirza Viqas Rauf	7 November 2014	26 April 2028	
7	Chaudhry Muhammad Iqbal	7 November 2014	31 October 2028	
8	Shehram Sarwar Chaudhary	8 June 2015	23 April 2030	
9	Muhammad Sajid Mehmood Sethi	8 June 2015	18 May 2030	
10	Mohsin Akhtar Kayani	23 December 2015	10 February 2032	Transferred from IHC on 29 April 2026
11	Tariq Saleem Sheikh	26 November 2016	23 June 2027	
12	Jawad Hassan	26 November 2016	27 July 2029	
13	Muzammil Akhtar Shabbir	26 November 2016	13 January 2031	
14	Farooq Haider	23 October 2018	23 April 2030	
15	Muhammad Waheed Khan	23 October 2018	27 April 2031	
16	Rasaal Hasan Syed	23 October 2018	10 September 2032	
17	Asim Hafeez	23 October 2018	13 September 2032	
18	Sadiq Mahmud Khurram	23 October 2018	7 January 2035	
19	Ahmad Nadeem Arshad	7 May 2021	1 May 2027	
20	Mohammad Tariq Nadim	7 May 2021	18 July 2029	
21	Mohammad Amjad Rafique	7 May 2021	1 February 2032	
22	Abid Hussain Chathha	7 May 2021	1 April 2034	
23	Anwaar Hussain	7 May 2021	15 January 2035	
24	Ali Zia Bajwa	7 May 2021	30 June 2035	
25	Sultan Tanvir Ahmed	7 May 2021	27 August 2035	
26	Muhammad Raza Qureshi	7 May 2021	14 September 2035	
27	Raheel Kamran Sheikh	7 May 2021	20 January 2036	
28	Hassan Nawaz Makhdoom	10 February 2025	31 October 2031	
29	Malik Waqar Haider Awan	10 February 2025	6 June 2033	
30	Sardar Akbar Ali	10 February 2025	5 July 2034	
31	Syed Ahsan Raza Kazmi	10 February 2025	23 April 2038	
32	Malik Javid Iqbal Wains	10 February 2025	17 January 2039	
33	Muhammad Jawad Zafar	10 February 2025	5 December 2039	
34	Khalid Ishaq	10 February 2025	3 February 2040	
35	Malik Muhammad Awais Khalid	10 February 2025	23 June 2040	
36	Ch Sultan Mahmood	10 February 2025	3 July 2040	
37	Tanveer Ahmad Sheikh	5 March 2025	26 December 2027	
38	Abher Gul Khan	5 March 2025	30 December 2034	
39	Tariq Mehmood Bajwa	5 March 2025	30 November 2030	
40	Ghulam Sarwar Nihung	11 August 2026	2 February 2029	Additional Judge, subject to confirmation
41	Muhammad Ajmal Khan Zahid	11 August 2026	14 March 2030	Additional Judge, subject to confirmation
42	Amir Ajam Malik	11 August 2026	7 December 2031	Additional Judge, subject to confirmation
43	Shireen Imran	11 August 2026	11 May 2032	Additional Judge, subject to confirmation
44	Asad Ali Bajwa	11 August 2026	31 March 2036	Additional Judge, subject to confirmation
45	Muhammad Amjad Parvaiz	11 August 2026	2 February 2037	Additional Judge, subject to confirmation
46	Khalid Ibn-i-Aziz	11 August 2026	15 June 2038	Additional Judge, subject to confirmation
47	Munawar Iqbal Duggal	11 August 2026	29 March 2039	Additional Judge, subject to confirmation
48	Syed Farhad Ali Shah	11 August 2026	17 June 2040	Additional Judge, subject to confirmation
49	Muhammad Usman Ghani Rashid Cheema	11 August 2026	18 July 2042	Additional Judge, subject to confirmation
50	Vacant			
51	Vacant			
52	Vacant			
53	Vacant			
54	Vacant			
55	Vacant			
56	Vacant			
57	Vacant			
58	Vacant			
59	Vacant			
60	Vacant			

=== PCO 25 March 1981 ===
The PCO of 1981 also afforded the Lahore High Court these three benches. The judges were required to take oath under the Provisional Constitutional Order. Four judges refused to do so and were relieved of office. Four other judges were not administered the oath, and were also relieved of office.

=== PCO 26 January 2000 ===
- Sir Rashid Aziz Khan Took oath under PCO
- Mian Allah Nawaz Took oath under PCO
- Falak Sher Took oath under PCO
- Ehsanul Haq Chaudhry Did not Take oath under PCO
- Tanvir Ahmad Khan Took oath under PCO
- Amir Alam Khan Took oath under PCO
- Iftikhar Hussain Chaudhry Took oath under PCO
- Fakhar-un-Nisa Khokhar Took oath under PCO
- Ghulam Mehmood Qureshi Took oath under PCO
- Karamat Nazir Bhandari Took oath under PCO
- Javed Buttar Took oath under PCO
- Mohammad Asif Jan Took oath under PCO
- Mohammad Nasim Chaudhri Took oath under PCO
- Mohammad Nawaz Abbasi, Took oath under PCO
- Tassadaq Hussain Jilani Took oath under PCO
- Raja Mohammad Sabir Took oath under PCO
- Sayed Zahid Hussain Took oath under PCO
- Munir Ahmad Mughal Took oath under PCO
- Fakir Mohammad Khokar Took oath under PCO
- Abdul Razzaq Sheikh Took oath under PCO
- Zafar Pasha Chaudhary Took oath under PCO
- Mumtaz Ali Mirza Took oath under PCO
- Asif Saeed Khan Khosa Took oath under PCO
- Ch. Ijaz Ahmad Took oath under PCO
- Iftikhar Ahmad Cheema Took oath under PCO
- Jawad S Khawaja Took oath under PCO
- Khwaja Mohammad Sharif Took oath under PCO
- Mian Mohammad Najam-uz-Zaman Took oath under PCO
- Mian Saqib Nisar Took oath under PCO
- Mian Zafar Yasin Took oath under PCO
- Riaz Kayani Took oath under PCO
- Najamul Hassan Kazmi Did not Take oath under PCO
- Syed Jamshed Ali Took oath under PCO
- Khalil-ur-Rehman Ramday Took oath under PCO
- Malik Mohammad Qayyum Took oath under PCO
- Nazir Akhtar Took oath under PCO
- Ali Nawaz Chohan Took oath under PCO
- Bashir A Mujahid Took oath under PCO
- Naeemullah Sherwani Took oath under PCO
- Molvi Anwar-ul-Haq Took oath under PCO
- Akhtar Shabbir Took oath under PCO
- Naseem Sikandar Took oath under PCO
- Nazir Siddique Took oath under PCO

=== PCO 3 November 2007 ===
- Iftikhar Hussain Ch Take oath under PCo as chief justice
- Khawja Muhammad Sharif Refused oath under PCo
- Sayyed Zahid Hussain Take oath under PCo
- Mian M Najamuz Zaman Take oath under PCo
- Mian Saqib Nisar Refused oath under PCo
- Asif Saeed Khan Khosa Refused oath under PCo
- Maulvi Anwarul Haq Take oath under PCo
- Nasim Sikandar Take oath under PCo
- Abdul Shakoor Paracha Take oath under PCo
- Mohammad Khalid Alvi Take oath under PCo
- Muhammad Sair Ali Refused oath under PCo
- Ijaz Ahmad Chaudhry, Refused oath under PCo
- Mian Hamid Farooq Take oath under PCo
- M. Bilal Khan Take oath under PCo
- Fazale Miran Chauhan Take oath under PCo
- Syed Shabbar Raza Rizvi Take oath under PCo
- M. A. Shahid Siddiqui Refused oath under PCo
- Syed Sakhi Hussain Bokhari Take oath under PCo
- Sardar Mohammad Aslam Take oath under PCo
- Sheikh Hakim Ali Take oath under PCo
- Mohammad Muzammal Khan Take oath under PCo
- Muhammad Jhangir Arshad Refused oath under PCo
- Sh. Azmat Saeed Refused oath under PCo
- Syed Hamid Ali Shah Take oath under PCo
- Umar AttaBandial Refused oath under PCo
- Sh. Javaid Sarfraz Take oath under PCo
- Syed Sajjad Hussain Shah Take oath under PCo
- Tariq Shamim Take oath under PCo
- Syed Asghar Haider Take oath under PCo
- Hasnat Ahmad Khan Take oath under PCo
- Iqbal Hameed-ur-Rehman Refused oath under PCo

== See also ==
- Supreme Court of Pakistan
- High Courts of Pakistan
- Islamabad High Court
- Balochistan High Court
- Peshawar High Court
- Sindh High Court
- Court system of Pakistan
- Supreme Court Bar Association of Pakistan
- Punjab Bar Council
- Punjab Judicial Academy
- Pakistan Bar Council
- Lahore High Court Bar Association
