= Iram Hassan Bajwa =

Pakistani politician

Member of the Provincial Assembly of the Punjab
- In office 29 May 2013 – 31 May 2018
- Constituency: Reserved seat for women

Personal details
- Born: 7 May 1980 (age 46) Lahore
- Party: Pakistan Muslim League (N)

Iram Hassan Bajwa (Urdu: ارم حسن باجوہ; born 7 May 1980) is a Pakistani politician who was a Member of the Provincial Assembly of the Punjab from May 2013 to May 2018.

== Early life and education ==
She was born on 7 May 1980 in Lahore.

She earned a Master of Arts in Human Resource Management in 2005 from the University of the Punjab.

== Political career ==
She was elected to the Provincial Assembly of the Punjab as a candidate of the Pakistan Muslim League (N) on a reserved seat for women in the 2013 Pakistani general election.
