= Aalia Neelum =

Justice of the Lahore High Court

- عالیہ نیلم

Chief Justice of the Lahore High Court
- Incumbent
- Assumed office 11 July 2024
- Preceded by: Shujaat Ali Khan

Justice of the Lahore High Court
- Incumbent
- Assumed office 12 April 2013

Personal details
- Born: 12 November 1966 (age 59)

Aalia Neelum (Urdu: عالیہ نیلم, born 12 November 1966) is a Pakistani jurist who has served as the Chief Justice of the Lahore High Court since 11 July 2024. Previously, she had served as a Justice of Lahore High Court since 12 April 2013.

On 4 July, Neelum was nominated as Chief Justice of Lahore High Court.

On 11 July 2024, she took oath as the Chief Justice at the Lahore High Court and became first female chief justice of Lahore High Court.

In August 2024, her appointment as Chief Justice of the Lahore Court was challenged in the Supreme Court by members of the Pakistan Bar Council. She has been accused of interfering in the administrative affairs of the district judiciary and favouring the PML(N)-led government.
