= Mamoon Rashid Sheikh =

Mamoon Rashid Sheikh مامون رشید شیخ

Chairman Competition Appellate Tribunal
- Incumbent
- Assumed office 17 July 2020
- Preceded by: Justice Mian Fasih ul Mulk

49th Chief Justice of the Lahore High Court
- In office 1 January 2020 – 18 March 2020
- Preceded by: Sardar Muhammad Shamim Khan
- Succeeded by: Muhammad Qasim Khan

Senior Justice of the Lahore High Court
- In office 1 January 2019 – 31 December 2019
- Preceded by: Sardar Muhammad Shamim Khan
- Succeeded by: Muhammad Qasim Khan

Justice of the Lahore High Court
- Incumbent
- Assumed office 19 February 2010

Personal details
- Born: 19 March 1958 (age 68)

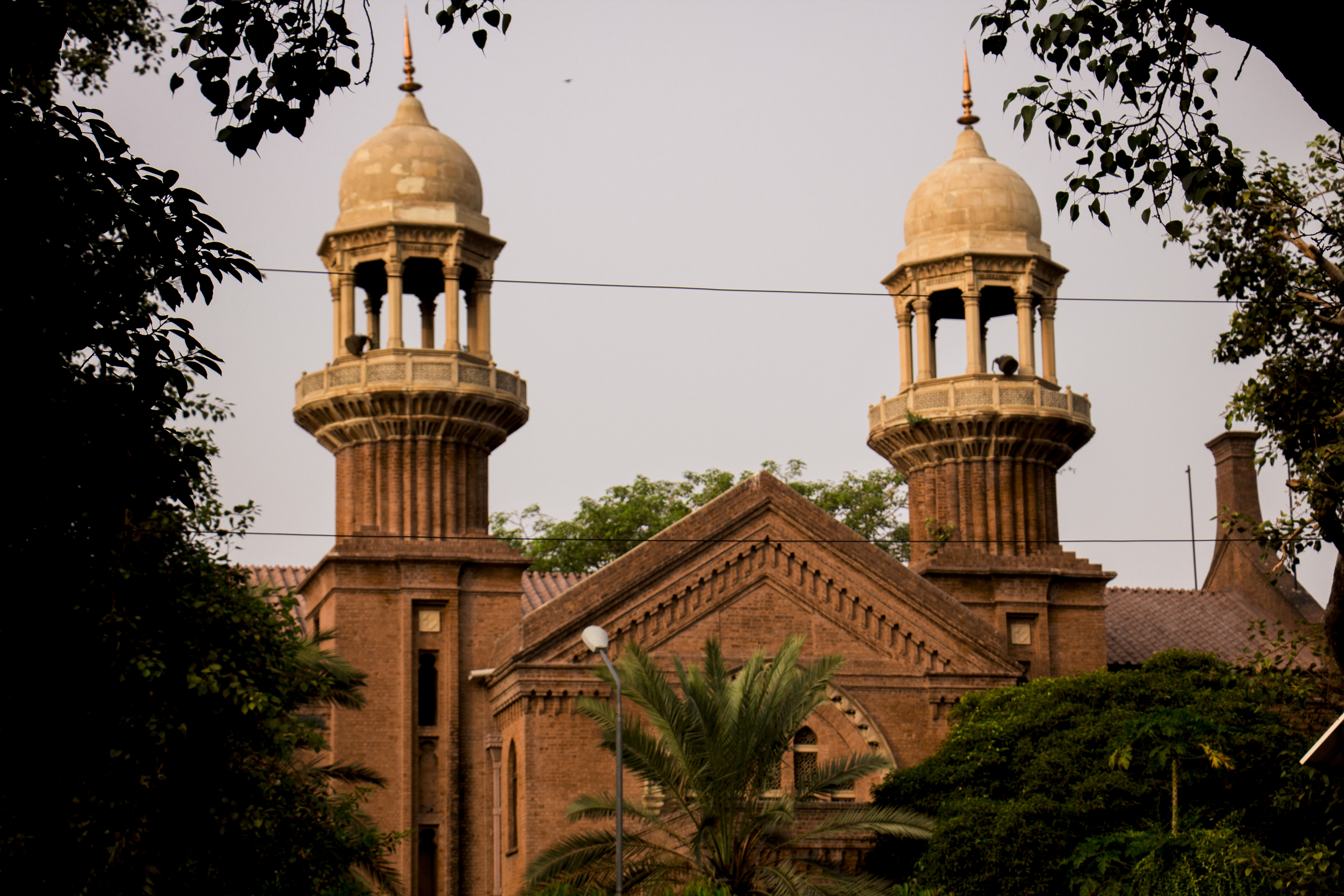
Lahore High Court

Mamoon Rashid Sheikh (Urdu: مامون رشید شیخ; born 19 March 1958) is a Pakistani jurist serving as chairman of the Competition Appellate Tribunal since 17 July 2020. He served as the 49th Chief Justice of the Lahore High Court from 1 January 2020 till 18 March 2020. Sheikh was born on March 19, 1958, at Lahore. He attended Prep. School at Queen Mary College, Lahore, and subsequently did his Matriculation from St. Anthony’s High School, Lahore. Thereafter, he graduated from Government College, Lahore.

He chose to join the legal profession by following the footsteps of his father, Justice A.R. Sheikh.

He obtained an LL.B. degree from University Law College, Punjab University, Lahore. Subsequently, he attended Brunel University, UK, and was awarded the GDSS.

Besides working in his father’s law firm, he also remained associated with Ansari Law Associates, Nisar Law Associates and Surridge & Beecheno. He founded his own law firm SSR&I in 2006.

He practiced mainly on the civil, commercial, corporate and constitutional side. He also dealt with arbitration matters and cases involving carriage by air, land and sea. He dealt also with medical malpractice cases, insurance disputes and intellectual property disputes.

He served as a Member of the Executive Committee of the Lahore High Court Bar Association.

He joined the Advocate General Punjab’s Office in 2009.

He was elevated to the Bench in February 2010.

He has dealt with civil, constitutional, criminal and commercial/corporate cases/matters. He acted as an Election Tribunal in the 2013 and 2018 general elections.

He has been the Inspection Judge for the Districts of Mianwali, Khanewal, Sahiwal, Multan, Rawalpindi, Faisalabad and Lahore.

He delivers lectures at the Punjab Judicial Academy.

He was a Member of the Graduate Studies Committee, University Law College, University of the Punjab, and was also Member Syndicate, University of the Punjab.

He has attended and/or chaired a number of law conferences/seminars in Pakistan. He represented the Lahore High Court at the Pakistan Independence Day Celebrations, held at Oslo, Norway, in 2016. He participated in a law conference on the topic, “Convergence and Co-operation in Asian Business Law”, at Korea University, Seoul, South Korea, in 2017. He was part of a Lahore High Court, delegation, which visited the United Kingdom, in 2017, to explore, identify and share issues/experiences in respect of judicial reforms and case flow management, etc.

He initiated the holding of the Sesquicentennial (150th) Anniversary Celebrations of the Lahore High Court, Lahore, in the year 2016. He acted as the Master of Ceremonies of the final event of the Celebrations.

He was appointed as the Chief Justice Lahore High Court, Lahore, on 06.12.2019, with effect from 01.01.2020, and took oath of office on the latter date.

He was appointed as Chairman of the Competition Appellate Tribunal on 15 July 2020 and assumed office on 17 July 2020.

Legal offices
Preceded by Sardar Muhammad Shamim Khan	49th Chief Justice of Lahore High Court	Succeeded by Muhammad Qasim Khan
