= Fakhar-un-Nisa =

Pakistani politician

Member of the National Assembly of Pakistan
- In office 2008–2013

Fakhar-un-Nisa Khokhar (Urdu: فخرانسا کھوکھر) is a Pakistani politician who served as member of the National Assembly of Pakistan.

== Political career ==
She was elected to the National Assembly of Pakistan as a candidate of Pakistan Peoples Party on a seat reserved for women from Punjab in the 2008 Pakistani general election.
