= Ali Zia Bajwa =

Justice of the Lahore High Court

- علی ضیا باجوہ

Justice of the Lahore High Court
- Incumbent
- Assumed office 7 May 2021

Personal details
- Born: 1 July 1973 (age 53)

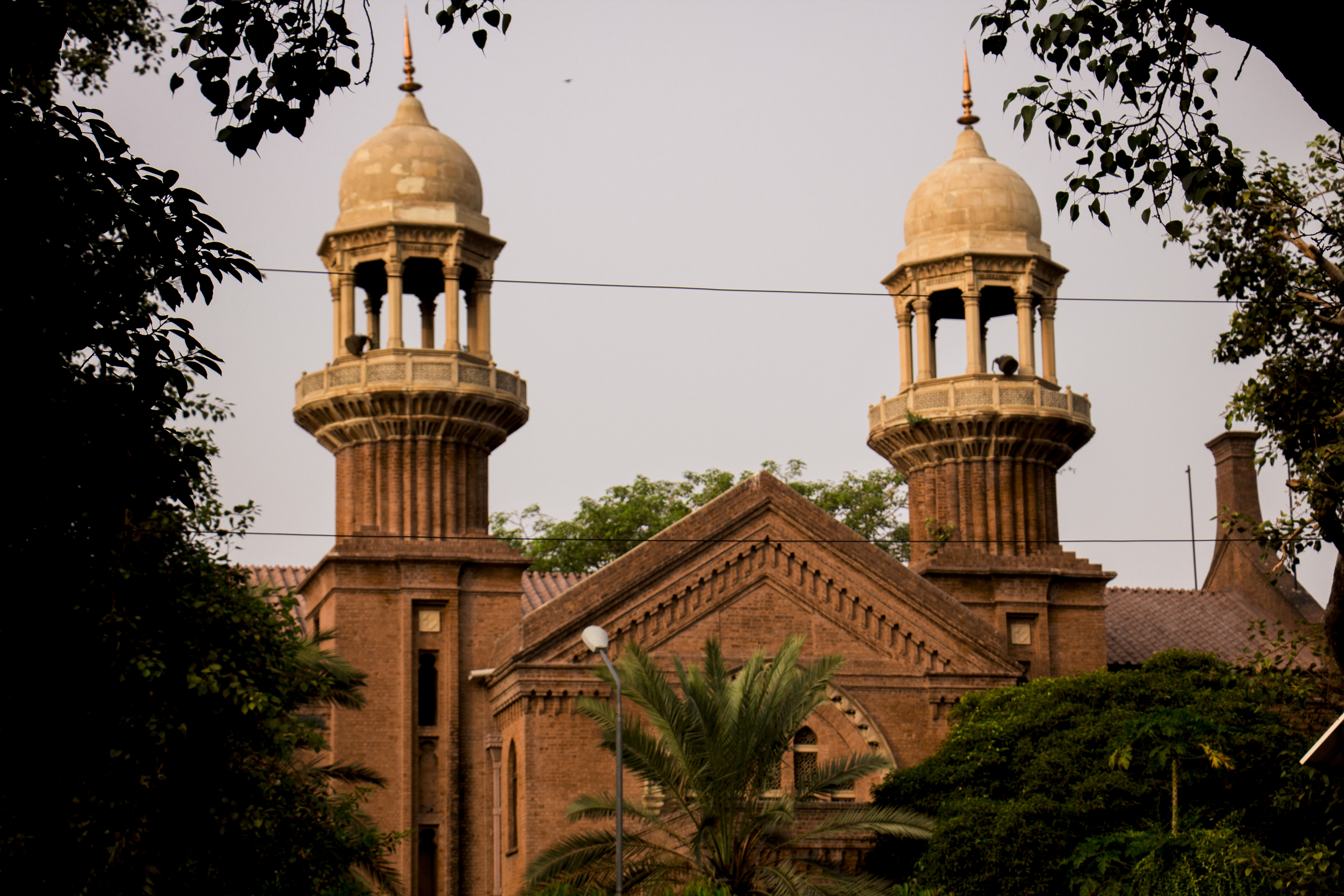
Lahore High Court

Ali Zia Bajwa (Urdu: علی ضیا باجوہ, born 1 July 1973) is a Pakistani jurist who has served as a Justice at the Lahore High Court since 7 May 2021.

== Career ==
Bajwa assumed the role of additional justice at Lahore High Court (LHC) on 7 May 2021. The confirmation of his appointment as a permanent judge of LHC came from the Judicial Commission of Pakistan, headed by then Chief Justice of Pakistan Umar Ata Bandial, on 13 October 2022. He officially took the oath of office as a permanent judge of LHC on 4 November 2022.

== Cases ==
On 24 December 2021, Bajwa issued a significant ruling in the case Ameer Bakhsh v. Additional Sessions Judge. This decision established that a woman who remarries without observing the Iddah after Khul' cannot face prosecution under Section 4 of the Hudud Ordinances. He determined that such a remarriage, without adhering to the Iddah period, does not render the marriage void and, consequently, cannot be considered an offence of Zina.

In his role as an LHC judge, he directed the apprehension of underage drivers following an incident where an unlicensed underage driver, wielding his motor vehicle as a weapon, tragically took the lives of six family members.
