= Muhammad Anwaarul Haq =

- محمد انوارالحق

47th Chief Justice of Lahore High Court
- In office 22 October 2018 – 31 December 2018
- Preceded by: Muhammad Yawar Ali
- Succeeded by: Sardar Muhammad Shamim Khan

Senior Justice of Lahore High Court
- Preceded by: Muhammad Yawar Ali
- Succeeded by: Sardar Muhammad Shamim Khan

Justice of Lahore High Court
- In office 19 February 2010 – 31 December 2018

Personal details
- Born: 1 January 1957 (age 69)

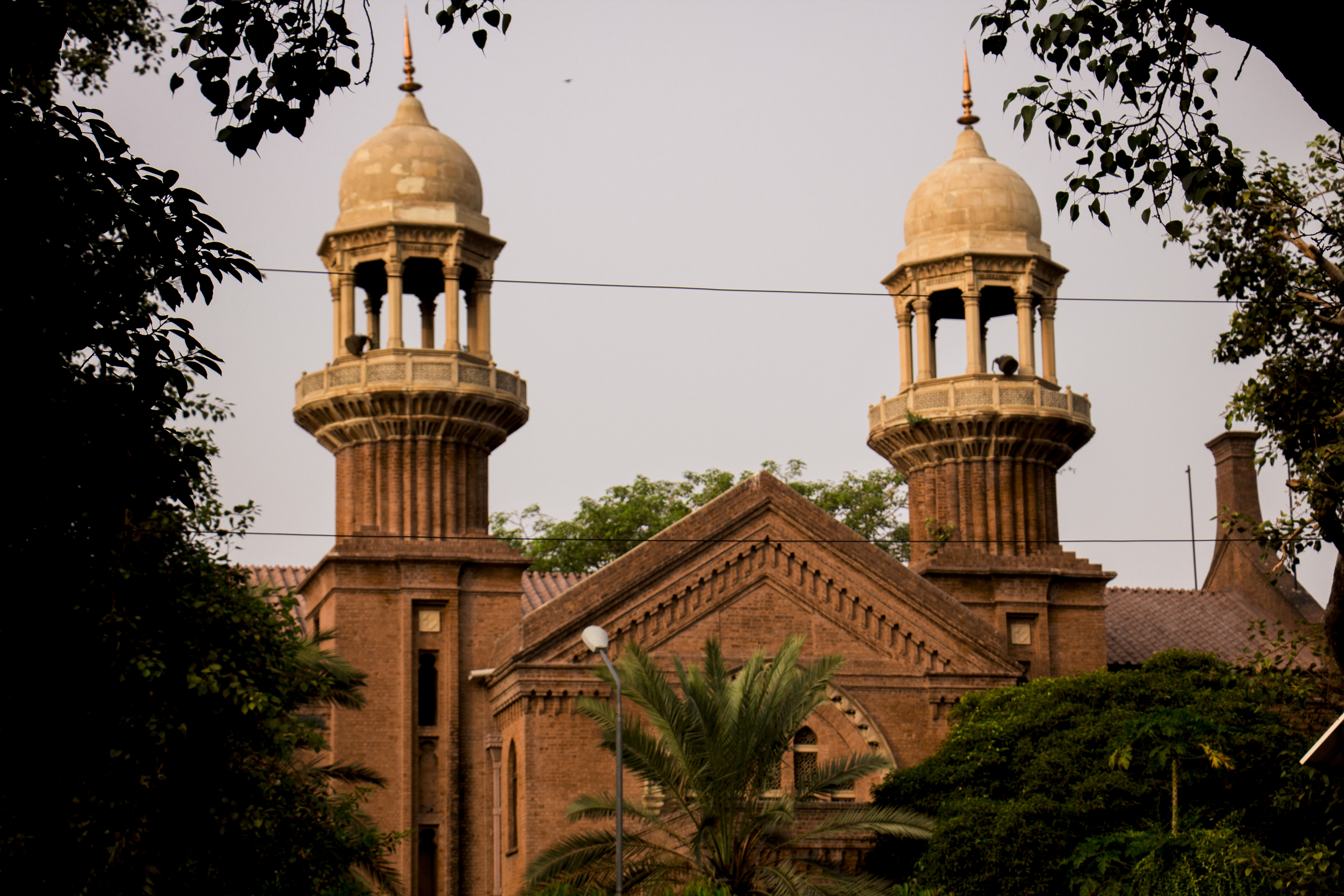
Lahore High Court

Muhammad Anwaarul Haq (Urdu: محمد انوارالحق; born 1 January 1957) is a Pakistani jurist and retired judge. He served as the 47th Chief Justice of the Lahore High Court.

== Career ==
Haq was appointed as a justice of Lahore High Court on 19 February 2010. He became chief justice of the same court on 22 October 2018.

Legal offices
Preceded by Muhammad Yawar Ali	47th Chief Justice of Lahore High Court	Succeeded by Sardar Muhammad Shamim Khan
