= Manzoor Ahmad Malik =

Pakistani judge

Manzoor Ahmad Malik is a retired Pakistani judge. He became a judge of the Lahore High Court in September 2009 and was appointed the 43rd Chief Justice of the Lahore High Court on 30th of March 2015. Justice Malik was elevated as a judge of the Supreme Court of Pakistan in November 2015.

Justice (R) Malik reportedly decided around 50,000 cases during his career; he retired in 2021. He is known for cases related to criminal jurisprudence. He authored a judgement to stop the execution of mentally ill death row convicts.

He founded a free legal aid society called Free Legal Aid Society for Helpless (FLASH). Justice (R) Malik is from Punjab.
