= Supreme Court of Pakistan Building =

Building in Islamabad, Pakistan

Supreme Court Building
- عمارت عدالتِ عظمیٰ پاکستان

General information
- Architectural style: Neoclassical, Modernist
- Location: Constitution Avenue; Islamabad, Pakistan
- Coordinates: 33.7257°N 73.1002°E
- Construction started: 1960s
- Completed: 1993; 33 years ago
- Cost: ₨. 170 million

Technical details
- Floor area: 44,023.1 square metres (473,861 sq ft)

Design and construction
- Architects: Kenzō Tange 丹下 健三
- Engineer: CDA Engineering; Pakistan EPA; Siemens Engineering

The Supreme Court Building in Red Zone, Islamabad is the official and principal seat of the Supreme Court of Pakistan, the apex court of the country. Completed in 1993, it is flanked by the Prime Minister's Office to the south and the Presidential Palace and the Parliament House to the north.

Designed by famous Japanese architect, Kenzō Tange, under the consultation of the EPA, the complex was engineered and built by the CDA Engineering and Siemens Engineering. The building was part of an effort by the government of Pakistan to incorporate modernism into the architecture of important government buildings, for which several architects were invited; Tange, after initially rejecting the invitation, ultimately agreed to participate.

== Gallery ==
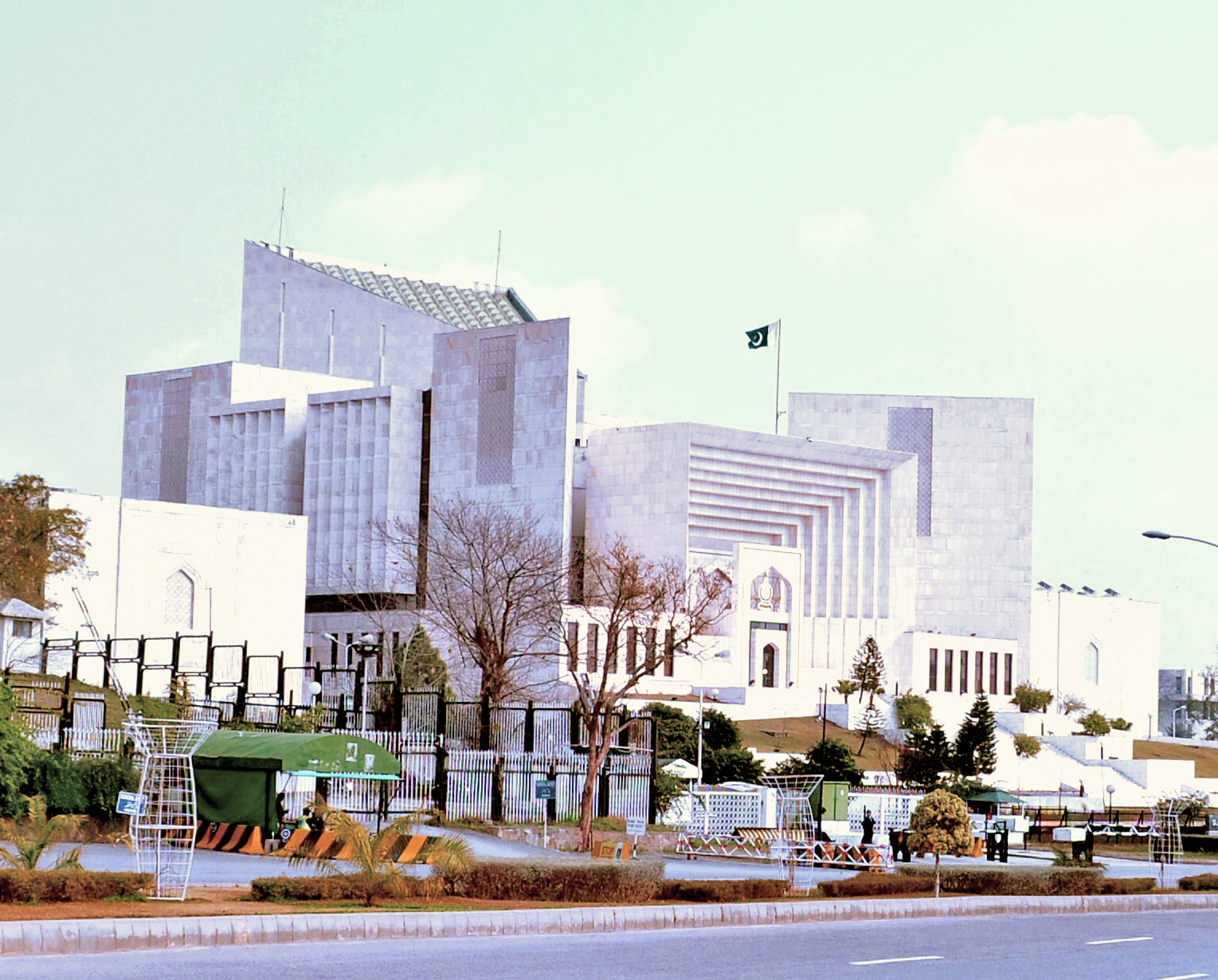
The Supreme Court Building (West corner)

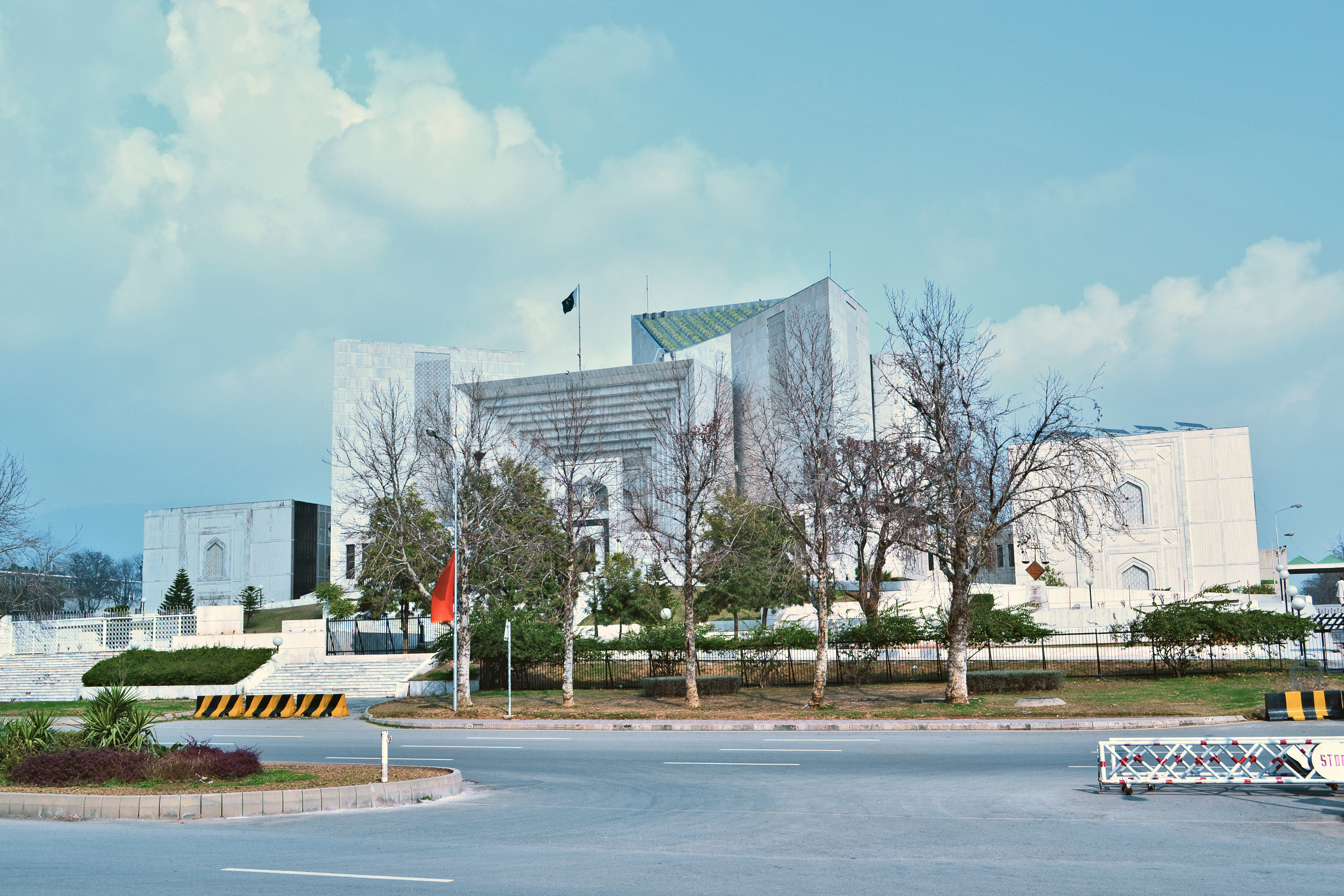
The Supreme Court Building (East corner)
