= Dorab Patel =

Pakistani judge (1924–1997)

Dorab Framrose Patel
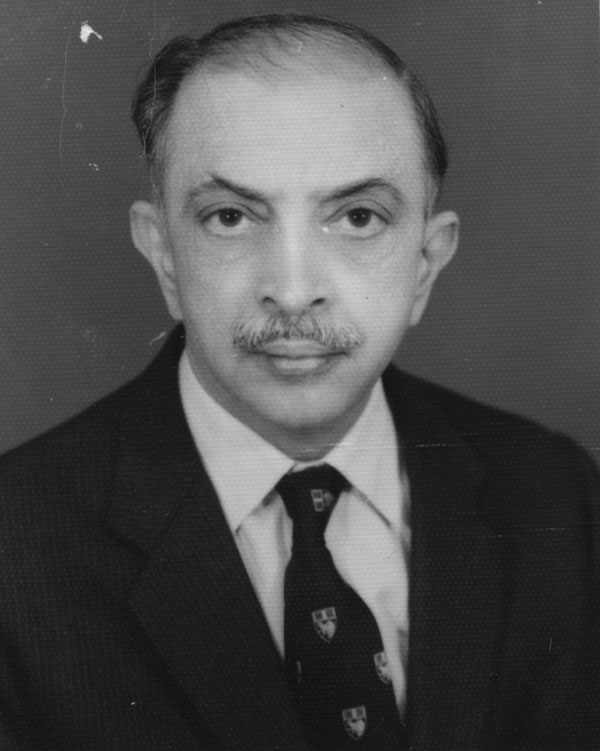
- Justice Dorab Patel, 1974

Justice of the Supreme Court of Pakistan
- In office 7 January 1976 – 24 March 1981
- Nominated by: Zulfikar Ali Bhutto
- Appointed by: Fazal Ilahi Chaudhry
- Preceded by: Hamoodur Rahman
- Succeeded by: Mohammad Haleem

Chief Justice of Sindh High Court
- In office 16 April 1970 – 7 January 1976
- Nominated by: Zulfikar Ali Bhutto

Chief Justice of West Pakistan High Court
- In office 6 December 1967 – 16 April 1970
- Nominated by: Ayub Khan

Personal details
- Born: Dorab Framrose Patel; 17 June 1924 Mumbai, British India
- Died: 15 March 1997 (aged 72) Islamabad, ICT, Pakistan
- Resting place: Karachi, Sindh, Pakistan
- Education: Bombay University (LLB); London School of Economics (MSc and LLM)

Dorab Framrose Patel (1924 – 15 March 1997) was a Pakistani jurist and lawmaker of Parsi descent who served as a justice of the Supreme Court of Pakistan and chief justice of the Sindh High Court. Patel was a prominent campaigner for human rights, and was a founding member of the Asian Human Rights Commission (AHRC) in 1987 and of the Human Rights Commission of Pakistan.

A Parsi by faith, he rose up the ranks of the judiciary to become one of Pakistan's most senior most judges, only to resign on principle after refusing to take an oath of allegiance to Chief Martial Law Administrator and Chief of Army Staff at that time, General Zia-ul-Haq in 1981. Patel died of leukaemia on 1997 in Islamabad, and was buried in Karachi.

== Judicial career ==
He was elected secretary of the High Court Bar in 1964 and was raised to the bench of the then West Pakistan High Court in 1967. Patel was elevated to the Supreme Court on 7 January 1976.

On 24 March 1981, General Zia ul Haq issued a Provisional Constitutional Order (PCO) and asked the Justices of the High Courts and Supreme Court to take oath on it. Patel refused to take oath and resigned. Had Patel not resigned, he would have become the Chief Justice of the Supreme Court. After his resignation from the Supreme Court, he devoted the rest of his life to waging a crusade for the rights of the oppressed and downtrodden. In 1990, he became the second Pakistani to be elected a member of the exclusive International Commission of Jurists (ICJ).

== Important decisions ==
- Patel was in the minority in a split decision of 4–3 that upheld the decision of Lahore High Court that handed down the death penalty to former Prime Minister Zulfikar Ali Bhutto.

== Publications ==
- 1989, Military Dictatorship in Pakistan and the role of Judges (in English and Urdu), by Dorab Patel.
- 1964, Testaments of Liberals: Jinnah Papers (in English only), by Dorab Patel
