= Constitution Avenue (Islamabad) =

Major avenue in Islamabad, Pakistan

- شاہراہ دستور
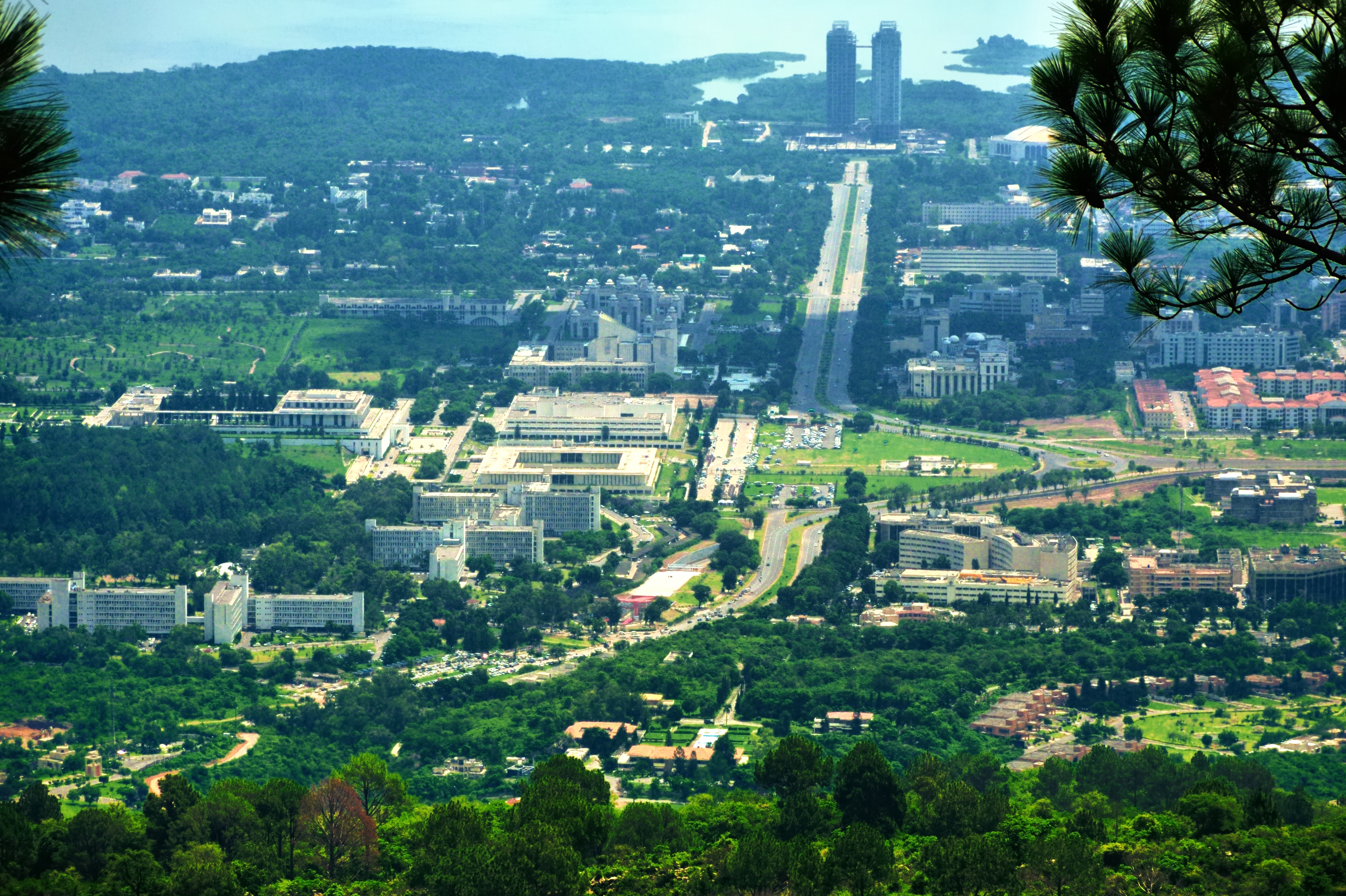
- Length: 3.8 km (2.4 mi)
- Postal code: 44000
- Nearest Metrobus station: Secretariat Station
- North end: Khayaban-e-Iqbal intersection
- Major junctions: D-Chowk
- South end: Srinagar Highway intersection

Constitution Avenue, also known as Shahrah-e-Dastoor (Urdu: شاہراہ دستور), is a major north–south avenue in Islamabad, Pakistan that passes through the Red Zone. Its north end meets with the Khayban-e-Iqbal intersection and south end with an intersection of Srinagar Highway.

A number of landmark and government buildings exist along the road, such as the Aiwan-e-Sadr, the Prime Minister's Office, the office of the Ministry of Foreign Affairs, the National Library of Pakistan, the Supreme Court of Pakistan, the Federal Shariat Court, the Cabinet Block, as well as the office of the Auditor General of Pakistan.

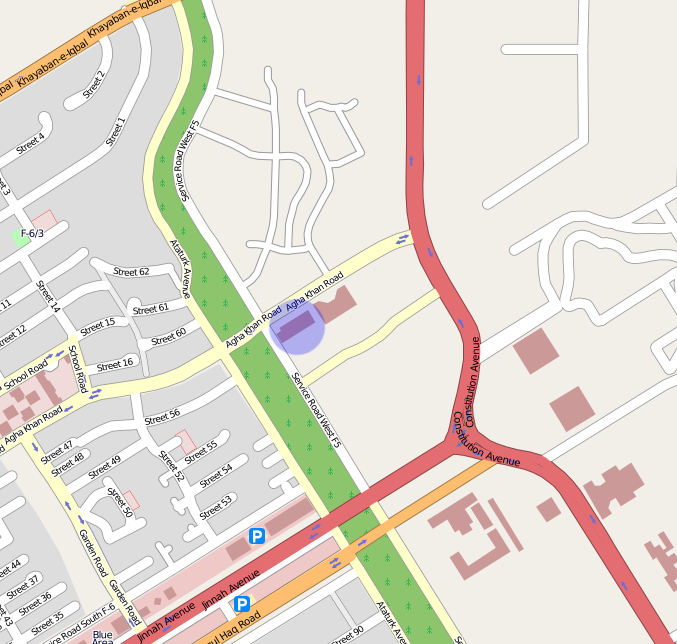
The Constitution Avenue, shown here in pink

The road has often been a site for political protests.

== Three Pillars of the state ==
The prominence of the Constitution Avenue can be gauged from the fact that road is marked with three branches of Pakistani state along with the office of the head of the state of Pakistan.

1. Aiwan-e-Sadr (the head of the state of Pakistan)
2. PM Secretariat (the executive branch of Pakistan)
3. Supreme Court (the judicial branch of Pakistan)
4. Parliament and Senate of Pakistan (the legislative branch of Pakistan)

These three branches of state were chosen to be constructed on the same road as to symbolize the unity of Pakistan's state organs.

== Ministries and departments ==
Constitution Avenue also serves as the headquarter for the multiple Federal Ministries and headquarter of various autonomous bodies. Following are some of the prominent departments located on the Constitution Avenue.

- Ministry of Science and Technology (Pakistan)
- Ministry of Foreign Affairs
- Ministry of Inter-Provincial Coordination and Sports.
- Federal Board of Revenue (HQ)
- Auditor General of Pakistan
- Attorney-General of Pakistan
- Election Commission of Pakistan
- Federal Shariat Court
- CPEC Authority
- Pakistan Halal Authority (PHA)
- Radio Pakistan (HQ)
- Islamabad High Court
- Economic Advisory Council
- PTV (HQ)
- National Library of Pakistan
- Establishment Division of Pakistan
- Cabinet Division of Pakistan
  - Ministry of Information and Broadcasting
- Pakistan Secretariat
  - Ministry of Commerce & Textile Industry
  - Ministry of Industries & Production
  - Ministry of Petroleum & Natural Resources
  - Ministry of Energy
  - Ministry of National Food Security & Research
  - Ministry of Federal Education and Professional Training
  - Ministry of Communications
  - Ministry of Railways
  - Ministry of Interior
  - Ministry of Law & Justice
  - Ministry of Kashmir Affairs & Gilgit-Baltistan
  - Ministry of Parliamentary Affairs
  - Ministry of States & Frontier Regions
  - Ministry of Aviation
  - Ministry of Human Rights
  - Ministry of Religious Affairs
  - Ministry of Overseas Pakistanis and Human Resource Development
  - Ministry of Narcotics Control
  - Ministry of National Health Services, Regulations and Coordination
  - Council of Common Interest
  - Board of Investment
  - Ministry of Planning & Development
  - Ministry of Finance, Revenue & Economic Affairs
  - Intelligence Bureau(HQ)
  - Pakistan Atomic Energy Commission(HQ)
  - Benazir Income Support Programme(HQ)

== See also ==
- Islamabad Expressway
- Srinagar Highway
- Seventh Avenue (Islamabad)
- Ninth Avenue (Islamabad)
