= Hameedur Rahman =

Pakistani judge (born 1956)

Honorable Iqbal Hameedur Rahman

Chief Justice of the Federal Shariat Court
- Incumbent
- Assumed office 1 June 2023
- Appointed by: Arif Alvi
- Preceded by: Justice Syed Muhammad Anwer

Senior Justice of the Supreme Court of Pakistan
- In office 24 February 2013 – 24 October 2016
- Nominated by: Pervez Ashraf
- Appointed by: Asif Ali Zardari
- Preceded by: Justice M.S. Jan
- Succeeded by: Justice Sajjad Ali Shah

Chief Justice of Islamabad High Court
- In office 3 January 2011 – 22 February 2013
- Nominated by: Yousaf Gillani
- Appointed by: Asif Ali Zardari
- Preceded by: M. B. Khan
- Succeeded by: Muhammad Anwar Khan Kasi

Judge of the Lahore High Court
- In office 2006–2011
- Nominated by: Shaukat Aziz
- Appointed by: Pervez Musharraf

Personal details
- Born: Iqbal Hameedur Rahman; 25 September 1956 (age 70) Dacca, East Pakistan, Pakistan (present-day Dhaka, Bangladesh)
- Citizenship: Pakistani
- Relations: Ashraf Ali Khan Chowdhury (grandfather)
- Parent: Hamoodur Rahman Chief Justice, 1968-1975 (father)
- Education: Punjab University

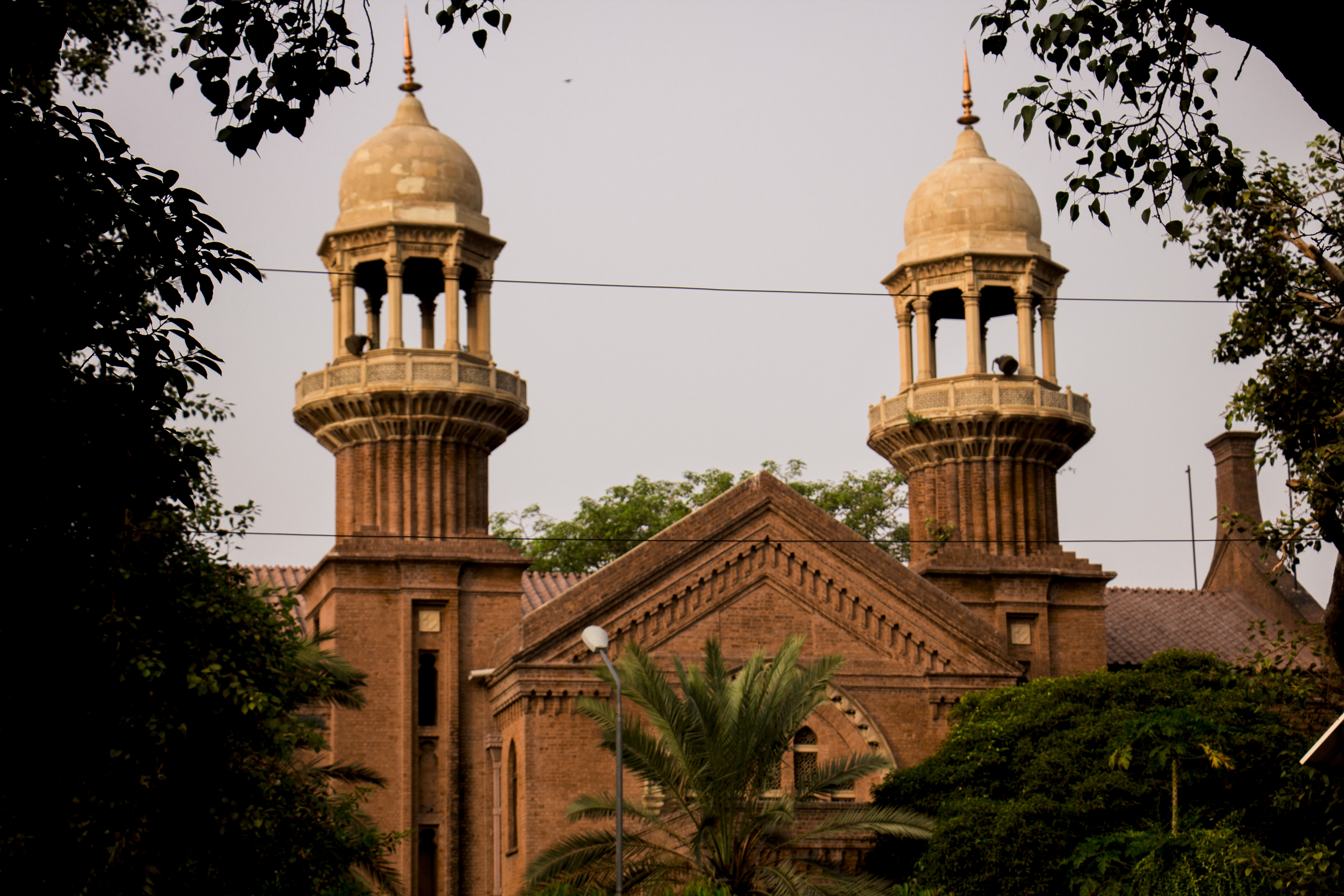
Lahore High Court

Iqbal Hameedur Rahman (Urdu:اقبال حميدرحمان; Bengali ইকবাল হামিদর রহমান born 25 September 1956) is the current Chief Justice of the Federal Shariat Court. Before that he was a senior justice of the Supreme Court of Pakistan. He is of Bengali origin and born in Dacca, East Pakistan. He served as a Justice of the Supreme Court of Pakistan, from 24 February 2013 until 24 October 2016 when he voluntarily tendered his resignation.

Prior to his appointment as a senior justice of the Pakistan Supreme Court, he served as the Chief Justice of Islamabad High Court, from 3 January 2011 till 22 February 2013, having secured nomination from Prime Minister Yousaf Raza Gillani and appointed by President Asif Ali Zardari. Earlier he served as a Lahore High Court judge from 2006 to 2011. He was the only son of famed chief justice of Pakistan Hamoodur Rehman.

== Family Identity ==
Iqbal Hameed ur Rahman is a scion of a noble family that has its roots in the legal fraternity since pre-partition of the Indian subcontinent. He hails from Patna, India. His grandfather Khan Bahadur Dr. Dawdood-Ur-Rahman MB, FRCS was of aristocratic Bengali origin and a Bangla speaking person living in Patna, India and was the first Muslim Civil Surgeon of undivided Bengal, who secured his FRCS degree from the Royal College of Surgeons of England, London. His paternal uncle, Maudood ur Rahman was a barrister, who later became a Judge of the Chief Court Calcutta. His maternal grand father late Mr. Ashraf Ali Khan was a barrister and a practicing Advocate in Calcutta High Court and was also a member of the Bengal Legislative Assembly in Calcutta and was later elected as Deputy Speaker of the said Assembly before partition. His illustrious father late Hon’ble Mr. Justice Hamoodur Rahman was appointed as Advocate General of East Pakistan in 1953, from where he was elevated to the Bench as judge of the Dhaka High Court in 1954. In addition he remained as the Vice Chancellor of University of Dacca (1958–60). He was appointed as judge of the Supreme Court of Pakistan in 1960 and was made the Chief Justice of Pakistan in 1968. He was author of the "Hamoodur Rahman Commission Report" which inquired into the circumstances leading to the breakup of Pakistan in 1971. Besides revealing the causes of the dismemberment of Pakistan, the report gave an account of the events that led to the tragedy. He was also the Chairman of Presidential Commission on Education (1964), Chairman Law Reform Commission (1967), member United Nations Committee on Crime Prevention and Control (1972–73) and Chairman of the Council of Islamic Ideology (1974–77).

== Early life ==
Hon'ble Mr. Justice Iqbal Hameed ur Rahman was born in Dacca in 1956. On the elevation of his illustrious father as judge of the Supreme Court of Pakistan, the family shifted to Lahore in 1960, where Mr. Iqbal Hameed ur Rahman started his primary education from St. Anthony High School, Lahore. After doing his Matriculation from the said institution, he joined Government College Lahore, from where he did his Intermediate in 1973 and Graduation in 1975. He obtained his professional degree of LL.B. from the University of Punjab, Lahore, Law College, Lahore in 1980. In addition he also obtained diploma in Labour Laws from the same University Lahore.

== Professional life ==
He started his professional career as an Advocate in 1981 in the District and Civil Courts in Lahore and was enrolled as an Advocate of Lahore High Court in 1983 and an Advocate Supreme Court in 1997. In 1998, he was elected as the Secretary of Lahore High Court Bar Association. In 2006, he was elevated as an Additional Judge of the Lahore High Court and was confirmed as a permanent Judge of the Lahore High Court on 27.10.2007 and served there till 2011.

"After the promulgation of Provisional Constitutional Order 2007, he was asked to take oath under the PCO. Like his courageous counterparts he stood for the rule of law in order to preserve the dignity and honor of his institution and the Constitution of Pakistan and refused to take oath under the PCO. He and his counterparts were subjected to an insurmountable mental anguish but no inducement or threat could deter him from his chosen path. He sacrificed his tenure of eleven years of judgeship at the altar of truth and rule of law with such dignity that the soul of his noble father would always be proud of him. He and his brother judges in the Lahore High Court ignited such flame in the heart of this nation that not only led to a great social awakening but also bound this society with the rule of law".

In 2009, an unfortunate incident happened in Gojra in which certain members of the Christian Community were burnt alive by a mob. Mr.Justice Iqbal Hameedur Rahman was entrusted with One Man Tribunal of Inquiry in respect of Gojra incident in the year 2009. His dignified stature not only stopped the communal violence but his report also chalked out certain objective guidelines for the protection of the rights of minorities in Pakistan. Later he was appointed as a member of the inquiry commission in respect of the plot to assassinate the Chief Justice Khawaja Mohammad Sharif. He has been a member of the Election Commission of Pakistan. After passing of the 18th Amendment and establishment of Islamabad High Court, he was elevated as the first constitutional Chief Justice of the Islamabad High Court on 03.01.2011, where he served till 22 February 2013. On 24 February 2013 He was appointed to the Supreme Court of Pakistan as a Senior Judge and served as such till 24 October 2016.

== Resignation ==
During his tenure as Chief Justice of the Islamabad High Court, few officers were appointed in the Islamabad High Court during the period 2011 and 2012, against which in adjudicating a reference application filed by the Islamabad High Court Bar Association, the Supreme Court of Pakistan had come to a categorical conclusion that judges involved in the appointments have acted "in complete disregard of the mandate given by the Rules framed under Article 208 of the Constitution" and had been involved in "cherry picking by deliberately ignoring merits of the candidates." The IHC Bar Association has taken very serious note of this matter, consequent to which Justice Hameedur Rahman tendered his resignation by writing resignation letter in his own hand on 23 October 2016, from the office of senior Justice of the Supreme Court of Pakistan. The reason although not disclosed in the resignation letter, yet it was presumed that he has voluntarily accepted the liability, since some of the appointment was made during his tenure, although the major appointments were made thereafter during the tenure of the next Chief Justice Mr. Justice Muhammad Anwar Khan Kasi. Supreme Court Bar Association of Pakistan (SCBAP) President Barrister Syed Ali Zafar welcomed and appreciated the resignation of Justice Iqbal Hameed-ur-Rahman as Judge of the Supreme Court of Pakistan.

He became the Chief Justice of Federal Shariat Court on 1 June 2023.
