= Hamoodur Rahman =

Pakistani jurist and academic (1910–1981)

The Honourable Hamoodur Rahman NI, HI
- حمود الرحمن হামুদুর রহমান
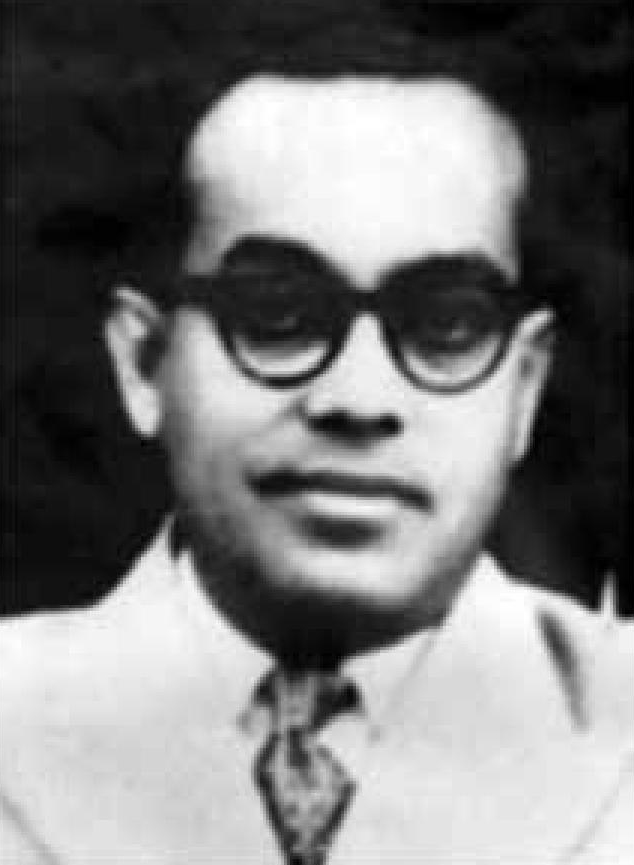

Chairman of the Council of Islamic Ideology
- In office 2 February 1974 – 1 February 1977
- President: Fazal Ilahi Chaudhry
- Preceded by: Allama Allauddin Siddiqui
- Succeeded by: Mohammad Afzal Cheema

7th Chief Justice of Pakistan
- In office 18 November 1968 – 31 October 1975
- Nominated by: Alvin Robert Cornelius
- Appointed by: Ayub Khan
- Preceded by: Fazal Akbar
- Succeeded by: Yaqub Ali

Senior Justice of the Supreme Court of Pakistan
- In office 15 December 1960 – 31 October 1975
- Appointed by: Ayub Khan

9th Vice-Chancellor of the Dhaka University
- In office 11 May 1958 – 14 December 1960
- Chancellor: President of Pakistan
- Preceded by: Muhammad Ibrahim
- Succeeded by: Mahmud Hussain

Personal details
- Born: Hamoodur Rehman; 1 November 1910 Patna, Bengal, British India
- Died: 20 December 1981 (aged 71) Islamabad, Pakistan
- Citizenship: British subject (1910–1947); Pakistan (1947–1981)
- Children: Hameedur Rahman Mahfoozur Rahman
- Education: University of Calcutta; University of London; Inns of Court School of Law
- Profession: Jurist
- Awards: Nishan-e-Imtiaz (1976); Hilal-i-Imtiaz (1974)

Supreme Court of Pakistan

Chief Justice Hamoodur Rahman (Urdu: حمود الرحمن; 1 November 1910 – 20 December 1981), NI. HI, was a Pakistani Bengali jurist and an academic who served as the 7th Chief Justice of Pakistan from 18 November 1968 until 31 October 1975.

Educated in law and trained as a jurist in the United Kingdom, he chaired the War Enquiry Commission to investigate the causes of the Bangladesh Liberation War that led to the creation of Bangladesh. In addition, Rahman served as a law professor in the faculty of Karachi University and vice-chancellor of the University of Dhaka while remaining active in promoting literacy across the country. After the independence of Bangladesh, Rahman's family retained Pakistan's citizenship, and his son served as the Chief Justice of Islamabad High Court.

Chief Justice Rahman remained a respected figure in Pakistan's judiciary, and is hailed for his honesty and patriotism. Senior Justice Khalil-ur-Rehman Ramday once publicly noted that "his Commission was the most honourable commission that was investigated by a Bengali Chief Justice, in spite of East-Pakistan disaster." His findings, which exposed the Bangladesh genocide and recommended charges for senior Pakistani officials, were never made public, as the report was muzzled by the Bhutto administration under the guise of harming civil-military relations.

== Biography ==
=== Early life, background, and education ===
Hamoodur Rahman was born in Patna, Bihar, British India, on 1 November 1910. Despite being born in Bihar, Rahman hailed from a Bengali Muslim family. Hamoodur Rahman's family practised law before the Partition of India— his brother, Maudoodur Rahman, was also a barrister who ascended as a judge of the Calcutta High Court. His father, Khan Bahadur Dawood ur Rahman, was the first Muslim civil surgeon in undivided India to do FRCS from Royal College London. He was the personal surgeon to the Emir of Kuwait. His father-in-law, Ashraf Ali Khan Chowdhury, was a barrister who was a practicing advocate in the Calcutta High Court. Ashraf Ali later participated in general elections held in 1930 and was a member of the Bengal Legislative Assembly. Ali later served as deputy speaker of the Bengal Legislative Assembly before the Partition of India.

Hamoodur Rahman was educated in Calcutta and entered St. Xavier's College of the University of Calcutta, where he secured his BA. He went to Great Britain to attend the University of London, where he graduated with the LLB degree and resumed his studies at Gray's Inn, London, and was called to the Bar in London in 1937.

Upon arriving in British India, Rehman began practicing law at the Calcutta High Court in 1938 and served as the legal councillor of the Calcutta Corporation in 1940. In 1943, he also presented the Mayor of Calcutta as its legal councillor, and was a member of the Junior Standing Counsel of East Bengal from 1943 to 1947. After the independence of Pakistan, he opted for East Pakistan and settled in Dhaka in 1948. He was the first legal advisor to the State Bank of Pakistan and drafted all the State Bank of Pakistan laws and rules. He was appointed Advocate-General of East Pakistan in 1953, and held it until 1954, when he was appointed to the bench as a judge of the Dhaka High Court by the Governor of East Pakistan.

=== Family ===
His son Justice Iqbal Hameedur Rahman is currently Chief Justice of the Federal Shariat Court. Iqbal was also the Senior Justice of the Supreme Court of Pakistan. In 2007, his son refused to take an oath under the Provisional Constitutional Order issued by President Pervez Musharraf, who imposed the Emergency in November 2007. After his restoration in 2009, he resumed hearing cases at the Lahore High Court and eventually ascended as Chief Justice of Islamabad High Court in 2013.

== Career as Supreme court justice ==
=== Supreme Court of Pakistan ===
Justice Hamoodur Rahman served as a judge of the Dhaka High Court from 1954 until 1960, when he was appointed as Senior Justice of the Supreme Court of Pakistan by the President of Pakistan. In addition, Rahman served as the vice-chancellor of Dhaka University from 11 May 1958 until 14 December 1960 while serving as visiting professor of law at Karachi University.

During his career as senior justice at the Supreme Court, Rehman held various dignified positions and engaged himself in promoting literacy across the country. From 1959 to 1960, he was a member of the International Court of Arbitration that is based in The Hague, Netherlands. In 1964, Rehman, at the request of the Ministry of Education (MoEd), led the "Commission on Students Problems and Welfare" as its chairman, where he authored the report and submitted the case study recommendations to the Government of Pakistan in 1966. In 1967, he was a member of the "Law Reforms Commission" that conducted the various case studies on land reforms in Pakistan on behalf of the Ministry of Law (MoL)– its report was submitted in 1970 to the President of Pakistan.

=== Chief Justice of Pakistan ===
In 1968, Senior Justice Hamoodur Rehman was nominated as Chief Justice by outgoing Chief Justice Alvin Robert Cornelius; his appointment as Chief Justice was approved by President Ayub Khan. His tenure witnessed the resignation of President Ayub Khan, who invited Yahya Khan to take over the country through enforcing martial law in 1969. He heard the petition filed by Asma Jillani against Yahya Khan's takeover in the case known as "Asma Jillani vs. Government of the Punjab." Upon hearing the case, the Hamoodur Rahman court retroactively invalidated the martial law that suspended the Constitution and notably ruled that Yahya Khan's assumption of power was "illegal usurpation". The Supreme Court also overruled and overturned its convictions that called for validation of martial law in 1958.

Chief Justice Hamoodur Rehman carefully distinguished the meaning of martial law in terms of controlling the internal disorder and imposing the martial law in alien territory. His stance stood firm against Yahya Khan's martial law but condoned such actions by the application of the doctrine of necessity. In 1970, he supported the Election Commission of Pakistan to hold the general elections held in 1970 across the country.

=== Bangladesh and 1971 war ===
Hamoodur Rahman remained loyal to Pakistan during the Bangladesh Liberation War and the war with India in 1971. He administered the oath of Zulfikar Ali Bhutto as President of Pakistan in 1971 at the Supreme Court building.

== After the war ==
In 1972–73, he went on to work with the United Nations and was a member of the Commission on Crime Prevention and Criminal Justice. Chief Justice Hamoodur Rahman retired with state honours in 1975 and administered the oath to appoint Senior Justice Muhammad Yaqub Ali as Chief Justice.

In 1974, he was the chairman of the Council of Islamic Ideology (CII) until retiring in 1977.

== War Enquiry Commission ==
In 1971, President Zulfikar Bhutto constituted a commission to investigate the responsibility and causes of the war with India that led to the liberation of East Pakistan and to provide insightful recommendations to prevent future armed foreign intervention. The commission, known as the War Enquiry Commission (or otherwise known as the Hamoodur Rahman Commission), was led by Chief Justice Hamoodur Rahman as its chairman and consisted of both civilian and military members.

Initially, Chief Justice Rahman was tasked to investigate the causes of the break-up of Pakistan, and the role of the Pakistan armed forces in the national politics. Because the armed forces feared that the report would damage their reputation if made public, it was not declassified for decades until the Pakistani newspaper Daily Jang exposed the details.

=== Fact finding and recommendations ===
From 1971 until 1975, the commission led by Rahman conducted several interviews of Pakistan military's senior officers, bureaucrats, politicians, activists, and the Bengali nationalists. Criticism of the government and misconduct of civilian politicians were very heavy and intense, therefore, the Hamoodur Rahman Commission Report was never made public in Pakistan and concealed all of its information, as the report was marked as "Top secret".

The report explores a number of issues, such as genocide of the Bengali populace—both civilians and Bengali soldiers—rape, pan smuggling, looting of banks in East Pakistan, drunkenness by military officers, and even an instance of a one-star rank officer "entertaining" women while their troops were being shelled by Indian troops. The report recommended a string of courts-martial and military trials against the top senior military officers, including the PAF's Air Marshal Enamul Haq (the AOC of Eastern Air Command of Pakistan Air Force), Vice-Admiral Mohammad Shariff (Fleet Commander of the Eastern Naval Command of Pakistan Navy), and Lieutenant-General Tikka Khan (the GOC of Eastern Army Command of Pakistan Army), and former generals such as Amir Khan Niazi and Rao Farman Ali.

Despite the commission recommending field courts-martial, there were no actions taken by Prime Minister Bhutto or the successive governments. Nearly 300 individuals were interviewed, and hundreds of classified armed forces military signals were examined. The final comprehensive report was submitted on 23 October 1974 by Chief Justice Hamoodur Rahman, who submitted the report to Prime minister Secretariat.

=== Rehman on "Separation" ===
Originally, the commission was to overlook the military failure to prevent the break–up of Pakistan, but Chief Justice Rahman went into great depths in the roots of the matter since the independence of Pakistan in 1947. A separate chapter on the political history of Pakistan was very detail-oriented and written by Chief Justice Rahman, who critically opined on the political role of Zulfikar Bhutto. Rahman critically opined on Bhutto and, to some degree, implicated Bhutto in manipulating President Yahya Khan to take the military action as a solution.

He noted that President Yahya Khan failed to seek a sincere political settlement with East Pakistan. Though the responsibility of the debacle lay on the shoulders of the people in power then as was recommended in the report by Chief Justice Rahman.

When the report was submitted, Prime Minister Bhutto wrote to the chairman of the War Enquiry Commission, Chief Justice Hamoodur Rahman, that the commission had exceeded its limits. The commission was appointed to look into the military "aspect of debacle", not the aspect of political failure; therefore, Bhutto classified the publications of the commission and marked its report as "Top Secret".

=== Fate of the Report ===
In 1974, the final report was submitted.

In the 1990s, it was revealed through investigative journalism by News International that the report was suppressed and was held secretly at the Joint staff HQ in Rawalpindi. In 2000, a portion of the report was leaked equally by the India Today and the Dawn. However, the India Today willfully suppressed its own publications as if the surrender was its own scandal.

== Death and legacy ==
Hamoodur Rahman lived a very quiet life in Lahore and remained active in the Supreme Court of Pakistan. He was appointed the Chairman of Islamic Ideology after his retirement for 3 years. Later he was appointed as an advisor to the president of Pakistan on constitutional affairs. He also conducted a commission on election reforms and proposed the proportional representation system existing in Germany, Sri Lanka, and many other countries. In which it can be accessed via the library to publish judicial supplements. He died in Lahore due to a cardiac arrest on 20 December 1981. He was buried in Lahore with close judicial associates and friends attending his funeral.

Chief Justice Rahman remained very respected in Pakistan's judiciary even after his death, and is hailed for his honesty and patriotism. Senior Justice Khalil-ur-Rehman Ramday once publicly noted that "his Commission was the most honorable commission that was investigated by a Bengali Chief Justice, in spite of East-Pakistan disaster", in 2010.

== See also ==
- List of Pakistanis
