= S. A. Rahman =

Pakistani judge (1903–1979)

Sheikh Abdur Rehman شیخ عبد الرحمان

5th Chief Justice of Pakistan
- In office 1 March 1968 – 3 June 1968
- Appointed by: Ayub Khan
- Preceded by: Alvin Robert Cornelius
- Succeeded by: Fazal Akbar

Personal details
- Born: 4 June 1903 Wazirabad, Punjab, British India
- Died: 11 February 1979 (aged 75)
- Education: Islamia College, Lahore University of the Punjab; University of Oxford (B.A); Cairo University

Sheikh Abdur Rehman (Urdu, شیخ عبد الرحمان) (4 June 1903 – 11 February 1979) was the 5th Chief Justice of Pakistan. He did his MA and Law from the University of Punjab, BA Hons from Oxford and Ph.D. in law from Cairo.

Abdur Rehman entered Indian Civil Services in 1926. He served as an Assistant Commissioner and a District and Sessions Judge in various districts of Punjab. He was appointed as a Judge of the Lahore High Court in 1946. He graduated from Islamia College, Lahore.

In 1947, he was appointed as a Member of the Bengal Boundary Commission. From 1947 to 1952 he acted as the Custodian of Evacuee Property Punjab. Abdur-Rehman remained the vice-chancellor of Punjab University Lahore from 1950 to 1952. He became the Chief Justice of Lahore High Court in 1954. He was elevated as the Chief Justice West Pakistan High Court in 1955. In 1958 he was made the Judge, Supreme Court of Pakistan. He replaced Justice A.R. Cornelius as the Chief Justice of Supreme Court of Pakistan. He retired as the Chief Justice on 3 June 1968. He also acted as Chief Election Commissioner in 1964, 1965, 1966, and 1967.

Besides his professional career he remained the Chairman Central Urdu Board Lahore, Director Institute of Islamic Culture, Lahore, Member Bazm-i-Iqal and the Board for the Advancement of Literature and President Pakistan Arts Council.

== Books ==
Abdur-Rehman has also three books to his credit:

- Tarjuman-I-Israr (an Urdu translation in verse of Iqbal's Israr-I-Khudi),
- Safar a collection of Urdu poems, and
- Punishment Of Apostasy in Islam (1972). In this latter work Rahman is one of a number of voices working from within the Islamic tradition who seek to reinterpret scriptural texts, and reform the scriptural reading of blasphemy and apostasy laws.

== See also ==
- Chief Justices of Pakistan
- Supreme Court of Pakistan

Legal offices
| Preceded by Alvin Robert Cornelius | Chief Justice of Pakistan; 1968 | Succeeded by Fazal Akbar |
