= Supreme Court of Pakistan =

Highest authority court of Pakistan

- عدالتِ عظمیٰ پاکستان
- Emblem of the Supreme Court of Pakistan

- Flag of the Supreme Court of Pakistan
- Interactive map of Supreme Court of Pakistan
- 33°43′41″N 73°05′55″E
- Established: 14 August 1947; 79 years ago
- Jurisdiction: Civil, criminal, and advisory
- Location: Red Zone, Islamabad, Pakistan
- Coordinates: 33°43′41″N 73°05′55″E
- Motto: فَاحْكُمْ بَيْنَ النَّاسِ بِالْحَقِّ "So judge between the people in truth" (Quran 38:26)
- Composition method: Judicial Commission of Pakistan
- Authorised by: Constitution of Pakistan
- Appeals to: President of Pakistan for Clemency/Commutation of sentence
- Appeals from: High Courts of Pakistan
- Judge term length: Compulsory retirement at 65 years of age
- Number of positions: 25
- Website: www.supremecourt.gov.pk

Chief Justice of Pakistan
- Currently: Yahya Afridi
- Since: 26 October 2024
- Lead position ends: 25 October 2027

Supreme Court of Pakistan Building, Islamabad.

The Supreme Court of Pakistan (SCP; Urdu: عدالتِ عظمیٰ پاکستان, romanised: 'Adālat-e-'Uzmā Pākistān) is the supreme judicial authority and the apex court of the Islamic Republic of Pakistan.

Established in accordance with Part VII of the Constitution of Pakistan, it has ultimate and extensive appellate, original, and advisory jurisdictions on all courts (including the high courts, district, special and Shariat court), involving issues of laws and may act on the verdicts rendered on the cases in context in which it enjoys jurisdiction. In the court system of Pakistan, the Supreme Court is the final arbiter of legal disputes and was the final interpreter of constitutional law until the Twenty-seventh Amendment created the Federal Constitutional Court of Pakistan, and the highest court of appeal in Pakistan.

Currently, the Supreme Court consists of Chief Justice of Pakistan, seventeen justices, and two ad-hoc appointments for Shariat Appellate Bench. Once appointed, justices are expected to complete a designated term and then retire at 65 years old, unless their term is terminated through resignation or impeachment by the supreme judicial committee resulted in a presidential reference in regards to the misconduct of judge(s). In their discourse judgement, the justices are often categorised as having the conservative, textual, moderate, and liberal philosophies of law in their judicial interpretation of law and judgements.

The Supreme Court has a permanent seat in Islamabad and meets at the Supreme Court Building at the Red Zone.

== History ==
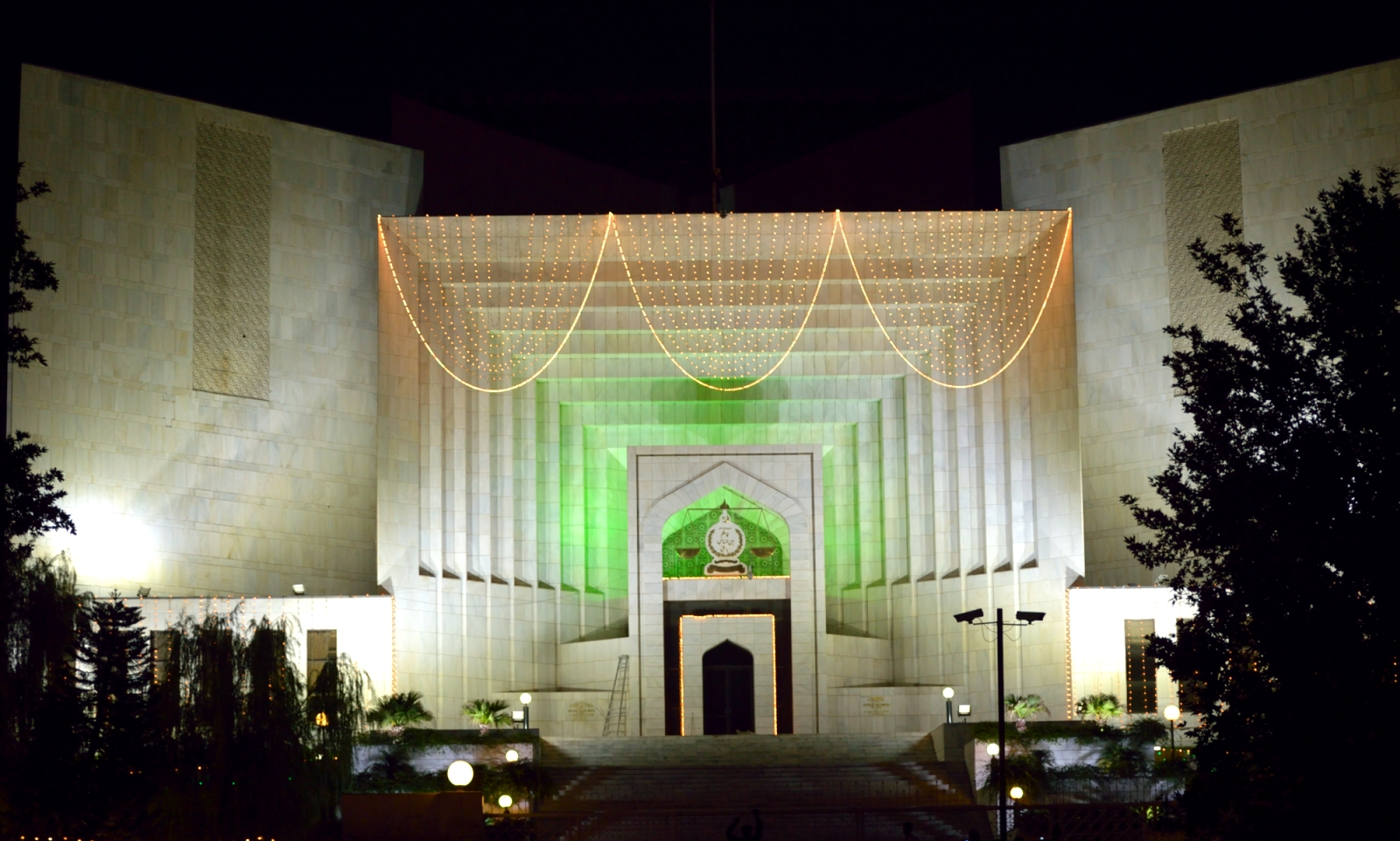
Supreme Court of Pakistan in night's view

In 1861, the British government in India enacted the Indian High Courts Act that created the high courts in all over the Indian subcontinent in various provinces while abolishing the supreme courts Calcutta, Bombay, Madras, Lahore, and also the Panchayati system in autonomous presidencies.

Until the enactment of the Government of India Act 1935 in 1935 that created the Federal Court, these new high courts had the distinctionary powers of being the highest Courts for all cases. The Federal Court had wide range of jurisdictions to resolve disputes between the provinces, presidencies, and the Government of India Act 1935, often hearing appeals against judgements of the High Courts.

After the partition of India in 1947, the Federal Court was also partitioned between India and Pakistan as Justice Sir Harilal Kania became the first Chief Justice of India and Justice Sir Abdul Rashid becoming the first Chief Justice of Pakistan.

While the tradition of British law culture continues to remain an integral part of the judiciary, the modern existence of the Supreme Court of Pakistan came when the first set of the Constitution of Pakistan was promulgated on 23 March 1956. The ratification of the Constitution of Pakistan reestablished the Supreme Court in 1956, replacing the name "Federal Court" to "Supreme Court", initially had its seat in Karachi where the Sindh High Court exists now. In successive years, the Supreme Court was moved to Lahore High Court until the Supreme Court was permanently moved into its new building constructed in Islamabad in 1964.

== Constitutional composition ==
=== Constitution of the court ===
Although the Supreme Court was established pursuant to the Government of India Act 1935, the modern structure of the court was reestablished by the second set in 1956, and restructured by the Constitution of Pakistan in 1973 where a significant part of the Constitution is dedicated towards the restructuring of the Supreme Court.

The Part VII of the Constitution, ranges from articles 176 through 191, deals with the powers, composition, rules, and responsibilities of the Supreme Court.

These articles concern:

- Article 176 – Composition of the Court
- Article 177 – Appointment and qualifications of the Chief Justice
- Article 178 – Oath of office
- Article 179 – Retirement
- Article 180 – Vacancy, absence, or inability of the Chief Justice
- Article 181 – Vacancy, absence, or inability of other justices
- Article 182 – Ad hoc appointments of justices
- Article 183 – Location of Court
- Article 184 – Jurisdiction in a dispute between two or more governments
- Article 185 – Jurisdiction to hear and determine appeals
- Article 186 – If requested, advise the President on important matters of law
- Article 186A – Authority to transfer venue
- Article 187 – Orders and subpoenas
- Article 188 – Power to review its own judgements and orders
- Article 189 – Binding nature of Supreme Court's decisions on all other Pakistani Courts
- Article 190 – All executive and judicial authorities in Pakistan bound to aid the Supreme Court

=== Size of Court ===
The Part VII of the Constitution of Pakistan reconstituted the composition of Supreme Court and the high courts but it does not specify the number of justices to be served in the Supreme Court. Qualifications to be served as a supreme court justice are strictly imposed that are based on merit, personal intellectualism, and experiences as a judge in the high courts.

In 1947, the Supreme Court consisted of a Chief Justice and six senior judges from Sindh, Punjab, NWFP, Balochistan, and East Bengal. Over the several successive years, the work of the Court increased and cases began to accumulate, leading the Supreme Court requesting the Parliament to increase the number of judges. As the number of the justices has increased, they sit in smaller benches of two or three (referred to as a division bench), however, coming together in larger benches of five or more (referred to as a constitution bench) when required to settle fundamental questions of law.

=== Eligibility, nomination and confirmation ===
The nomination of justices in the Supreme Court comes from an executive selection made by the Prime Minister based on judges' merited qualifications, personal intellectualism, and experiences as judge in high courts. The President then confirms the nomination summary and eventually appoints the Chief Justice and judges in the Supreme Court.

The Constitution states that a nominee is not eligible unless they are:

- A citizen of Pakistan who:
  - has for a period of, or for periods aggregating, not less than five years been a judge of a High Court (including a High Court which existed in Pakistan at any time before the commencing day); or
  - has for a period of, or for periods aggregating not less than fifteen years been an advocate of a High Court (including a High Court which existed in Pakistan at any time before the commencing day).

Since the 1990s, the nomination and confirmation process has attracted considerable attention from the print press and electronic media, as news media often comments on the executive's selection for the appointment. Appointments of Chief Justices Saeeduzzaman Siddiqui, S.A. Shah, Iftikhar Chaudhry, Faisal Arab, and T.H. Jillani Saqib Nisar and Asif Saeed Khosa have gain prominent attention from media in all over the country, mainly due to their ideological and philosophical leanings.

Furthermore, the major and influential recommendations for judges to be elevated at the Supreme Court as justices comes from the Judicial Commission that is chaired by the Chief Justice of Pakistan who prepares the qualification summary before the nomination sent to executive.

==== Ad–hoc appointments and removal ====
There has been Ad hoc appointment in the Supreme Court made when the quorum of Judges is not possible to complete the sitting number of justices in the court, or if it is necessary to increase the number of justices in the Supreme Court. The nomination comes directly from the Judicial Commission chaired by the Chief Justice who prepares the nomination summary as President confirms their appointments.

As of current, there are two justices are on the ad hoc appointment that are from the Federal Sharia Court.

A judge of the Supreme Court can be removed under the Constitution only on grounds of proven misconduct or incapacity and by an order of the President of Pakistan. A written reference has to be sent to the Supreme Judicial Council that will conduct the hearings of allegations of misconduct that would determine the removal of judge.

=== Tenureship, salaries and post-retirement ===
The Judicial Commission determines the salary, other allowances, leave of absence, pension, etc. of the Supreme Court justices. A Supreme Court justice gets ₨. 558,907.00 ($5,333.85) with additional allowances of ₨. 259,009.00 ($2471.81). Other benefits include the free housing and medical treatment as well as tax-free electricity bills. A judge who has retired as a justice of the Supreme Court is debarred from practising in any court of law or before any other authority in Pakistan.

== Judicial independence ==
The Supreme Court has the explicit de jure powers and enjoys the powerful judicial independence to block the exercise of certain Prime Minister's executive powers or Parliament's legislative powers that repugnant to Constitution. The Supreme Court has maintained its institutional integrity and has been able to maintain its authority to some degree in the face of martial law in Pakistan in last decades.

In another example of a de jure power granted to the Court, article 17 of the Constitution states:

Every citizen, not being in the service of (State of) Pakistan, shall have the right to form or be a member of a political party, subject to any reasonable restrictions imposed by law in the interest of the sovereignty or integrity of Pakistan and such law shall provide that where the Government declare that any political party has been formed or is operating in a manner prejudicial to the sovereignty or integrity of Pakistan, the Federal Government shall, within fifteen days of such declaration, refer the matter to the Supreme Court whose decision on such reference shall be final.

— Article 17:Freedom of association; Chapter I: Fundamental Rights and Principles, Constitution of Pakistan, Chapter source

The Supreme Court thus provides, in principle, an important safeguard against the abuse of laws that could potentially have politically repressive consequences or in clear violation of human rights.

The Constitution also allows the Supreme Court to exercise powers and take sua sponte actions against the person, regardless of its statue, or the authority, of being disobedient to or disrespectful towards the Supreme Court, its justices, and its officers in the form of behaviour that opposes or defies the Supreme Court's institutional integrity and popular authority.

In 1997, Chief Justice S.A. Shah found Prime Minister Nawaz Sharif of contempt of court but the order itself was voided by the Supreme Judicial Council. In 2012, Chief Justice Iftikhar Chaudhry retroactively barred Prime Minister Yousaf Raza Gillani of holding the office after the latter was found of in charges of court of contempt and refusing to follow the court's orders.

In 2013, the Supreme Court took suo motu actions against populist Imran Khan of criticising against the judgement of the Supreme Court's senior judges in regards to the elections. The case was later dropped when Attorney-General assured the Supreme Court justices that Imran Khan did not insubordinate the judiciary.

=== 26th amendment controversy ===
Pakistani politicians have historically voiced concerns over judicial involvement in governance, often calling for a recalibration of power between the judiciary and the legislature. On 21 October 2024, the National Assembly passed the 26th Amendment in an hours-long, overnight session. Previously, the senior-most judge in the Supreme Court would automatically succeed as Chief Justice upon retirement of the incumbent at age 65. Under the new amendment, the Chief Justice of Pakistan will now be nominated by a Special Parliamentary Committee from among the three most senior judges of the Supreme Court, with a fixed term of three years.

The government, led by the Pakistan Muslim League (N) (PML-N) and supported by its coalition partner, the Pakistan People's Party (PPP), has argued that the amendment is necessary to curb what it views as judicial overreach. Prime Minister Shehbaz Sharif described the amendment as an assertion of legislative authority and a step toward restoring balance in Pakistan's constitutional structure. Supporters claim that the judiciary's previous involvement in political matters had, at times, led to decisions undermining elected governments and democracy itself.

The change prompted criticism and concern over its potential impact on judicial independence. Former Sindh High Court Bar Association president Salahuddin Ahmed shared a statement from the Karachi Bar Association that criticised the amendment's passage, calling it a "dark day in the democratic history" of the country due to its approval in a "non-transparent and hasty manner without any debate." In contrast, Prime Minister Shehbaz Sharif referred to the amendment as a "historical achievement," asserting that it reinforced "parliamentary sovereignty." Interior Minister Mohsin Naqvi also lauded the legislation, claiming it would ensure "speedy justice" and facilitate "positive reforms." While significant concerns about the amendment's implications for judicial independence have been raised, supporters maintain that the changes aim to create a more efficient, accountable, and transparent judicial appointment process.

Lawmakers from the opposition party the Pakistan Tehreek-e-Insaf (PTI), criticised the amendments as an effort to weaken the judiciary and called it a "black day" in Pakistan's constitutional history. United Nations Human Rights chief Volker Türk also expressed concern that the 26th Constitutional Amendment could significantly undermine the judiciary's independence, stating that "Constitutional reforms must be in line with international human rights law." The International Commission of Jurists (ICJ) similarly criticised the amendment, describing it as a "blow to judicial independence." However, it also acknowledged that some reforms to the judicial system were needed to enhance efficiency and accountability.

=== Court demographics ===
In practice awarded by Constitution, judges of the supreme court have been selected so far, mostly from amongst judges of the high courts. The Constitution allows the judges to be appointed at the Supreme Court regardless of colour, race, and religious sect. Justices A.S.M. Akram, Fazal Akbar, Amin Ahmed, Abdus Sattar, Hameedur Rahman, and Hamoodur Rahman (Chief Justice) were the Bengali/Bihari jurists who served as senior justices in the Supreme Court. In 1960, Justice Alvin Robert Cornelius became the first Christian to be served as Chief Justice, while George Constantine also served in the Court.

In the 1970s–1980s, Justice Dorab Patel was the first Zorastrian, followed by Justice Rustom Sidwa who served as Supreme Court justice from 1989 until 1993. Justice Rana Bhagwandas was the first Hindu jurist who has distinction being the Chief Justice of Pakistan in 2007. Justice Qazi Faez Isa is of the Hazara descent who is currently serving as the Chief Justice of the Supreme Court.

In January 2022, Ayesha Malik was sworn in as the first female Supreme Court judge.

=== Judicial and philosophical leanings ===
The jurists/judges do not represent or receive the official political endorsements from the nation's political parties which is an acceptable professional practice in the executive branch of the government. As their American counterparts in the U.S. Supreme Court, the Jurists philosophical leanings in the Supreme Court are often categorised as conservative, moderate, liberal, and textualist that reflected in their judicial interpretation of the judgements in the impending cases of importance.

In 1947, Governor-General Muhammad Ali Jinnah confirmed the nomination of Justice Sir Abdul Rashid, at the behest of Prime Minister Liaquat Ali-Khan, was said to be a national conservative leanings in his judgement. His successor, Chief Justice Muh'd Munir, was a liberal in his jurisprudence but sided with conservative judgement when validated dissolution of the first Constituent Assembly in 1954 and the National Assembly in 1958 in the light of doctrine of necessity. Under the Chief Justice Muh'd Shahabuddin, the Supreme Court had the conservative leanings in regards to the constitutionalism and their judgements in the cases of important issues. Chief Justice Shahabuddin plays a crucial role in drafting the second set of the Constitution of Pakistan which incorporated the liberal ideas with the important Islamic provisions.

In 1960, President Ayub Khan appointed Justice Alvin Robert Cornelius who took much liberal approach in his jurisprudence when deciding cases on fundamental rights against the executive overreach. Justice Cornelius led Supreme Court's verdicts on many constitutional cases were carefully sided with the Islamic ideas but provided much broader role of liberal ideas to safeguard the fundamental rights of the ordinary citizens while being critical of the state emergency.

In 1968, the Supreme Court was greatly divided when Chief Justice Hamoodur Rahman presided the case hearings after President Yahya Khan declared martial law and suspended the writ of the constitution. In the views of Chief Justice Rahman, the martial law was invalid and notably ruled that Yahya Khan's assumption of power was "illegal usurpation". The Supreme Court also overruled and overturned its convictions that called for validation of martial law in 1958. Despite rulings, there was a split decision between the moderate justices, including Chief Justice Rahman, and conservative leaning justices of the Supreme Court who "condoned" the actions in the light of "doctrine of necessity". The de jure powers of the Supreme Court have increased since presiding the War Enquiry Commission in 1974, intervening in the events that Supreme Court justices viewed as violation of human rights by the executive authorities.

In 1977, the Supreme Court had again legalised the martial law in the light of "doctrine of necessity" and denied taking petitions to review its decision. During this time, Supreme Court justices were described as notoriously conservative and only a few moderates, appointed by Prime Minister Zulfikar Ali Bhutto as his role as President in 1971–73. The Supreme Court, however, did take the petitions to review the case of Zulfikar Ali Bhutto, after his counsels filed an appeal against the verdict of Lahore High Court. The Constitution Bench formed under Chief Justice Sh. Anwarul Haq, had contained Justice Muhammad Akram, Justice Dorab Patel, Justice Mohammad Haleem, Justice Nasim Hasan Shah, Justice Ghulam safdar Shah, Justice Kareem Illahi, Justice Waheedudin Ahmad, and Justice Kaisar Khan. By 1979, the Supreme Court greatly divided with Justice Dorab Patel, Justice G.S. Shah, and Justice Moh'd Haleem, who had the moderate and liberal leanings in their jurisprudence strongly disagreed with Bhutto's sentence of Capital punishment. On the other hand, Chief Justice Haq, Justice N.H. Shah, Justice Waheedudin Ahmad, and Justice Kaisar Khan, were described as having conservative/texualist ideology in their rulings and found Bhutto suitable for capital punishment; hence, marking a split decision by 4:3.

In 1993, Prime Minister Benazir Bhutto controversially elevated the Supreme Court jurist, SA Shah, who had known for his liberal jurisprudence, as Chief Justice over two senior ranking jurists at the Supreme Court. However, Justice Shah's judicial leanings did not protected the Benazir' administration when it was dismissed by President Farooq Leghari over allegations on corruption. In 1997, judicial crises reached its peak when Supreme Judicial Council took up the case against Justice Shah's appointment who eventually resigned from his office and succeeded by conservative jurist Ajmal Mian, only to be replaced with conservative jurist Saeeduzzaman Siddiqui as the new Chief Justice.

On 12 October 1999, the Supreme Court partially validated the martial law in the light of "doctrine of necessity" on the technicality but Chief Justice Saeeduzzaman Siddiqui decided to hear the petitions over the legality of the martial law. Although, the Supreme Court had only validated the martial law for three-years only, the Supreme Court's jurists and Justice Saeeduzzaman Siddiqui in clear view of this coup as a "violation of constitution" as Sharif's lawyers made a ground base for finding Musharraf of treason.

General Musharraf, acting as Chief Executive, forcefully retired the conservative leaning jurists and elevated the judges who had known to have libertarian views in their jurisprudence at the Supreme Court, including Justice Irshad Hasan Khan as Chief Justice. In 2002, The Supreme Court supervised the general elections successfully oversaw the transition of power from the office of Chief Executive to Prime minister. The legalisation of Contempt of court act further strengthened the judicial independence of the Supreme Court in 2004 when Shaukat Aziz became prime minister.

In a lecture in November 2022, Justice Ayesha A. Malik observed an increasing tendency to bring political and social issues to court that would be more suited for resolution within parliament or by the executive. Noting that this is the point at which balancing of power, judicial restraint (refraining from undue interference in other branches of government) and legal clarity become relevant, Malik expressed the view that courts should not act solely on compassion but instead prioritise upholding the rule of law.

Ruling on taxpayer rights

In a landmark 2025 judgment, the Supreme Court of Pakistan ruled against the Federal Board of Revenue (FBR), emphasising that tax recovery must uphold the dignity and legal rights of citizens. Authored by Justice Ayesha Malik, the ruling dismissed FBR's petition to justify same-day recovery notices under Section 140 of the Income Tax Ordinance.

The Court underscored that such practices violate the principles of due process under Article 10A and the constitutional right to dignity under Article 14. The bench, led by Justice Munib Akhtar, reaffirmed that even in tax matters, coercive actions must not harass or intimidate taxpayers a reflection of the broader plight faced by many Pakistanis under heavy-handed enforcement

== Court composition ==
The justices and jurists of the supreme court are set to retire at the age of 65, unless the jurists sooner resign or are removed from office, or records written reasons for deviating from this rule in accordance with the Constitution. By an act of parliament of 1997, the number of judges was fixed at 17. However, in 2024, strength of Supreme Court was increased to 25 judges. Currently, there are sixteen judges and nine positions are vacant. There are two ad hoc appointment of the jurists from the Federal Shariat Court to assist with religiosity concerned cases.

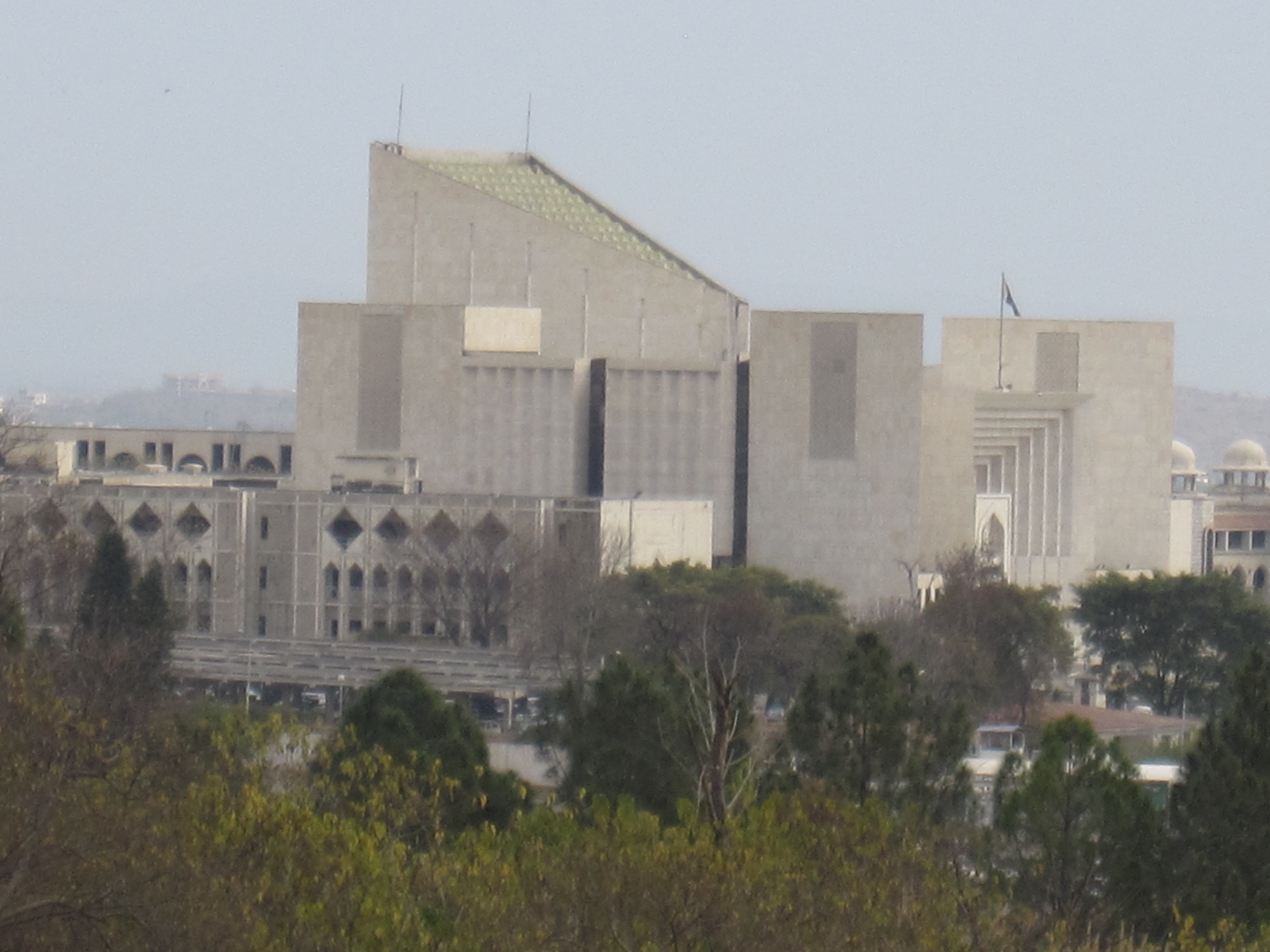
Supreme Court of Pakistan from govt flats, Islamabad.

=== Chief Justice of Pakistan and justices ===
As of current formation, Yahya Afridi is tenuring as the Chief Justice of Pakistan, having been appointed on 26 October 2024. The Supreme Court is currently composed of the following justices (in order of seniority), including the eighteen regular judges (inclusive of the Chief Justice) and two ad-hoc judges for Shariat Appellate Bench.

The Shariat Appellate Bench is composed of legal scholars that have expertise on Islamic jurisprudence since its establishment in 1980. The ad hoc appointments for this bench are drawn either from the Federal Shariat Court or from among the Clergy. Decisions made the Federal Shariat Court may be appealed to the Appellate Bench, as the Appellate Bench of Supreme Court is the final authority on Islamic interpretation of law in Pakistan.

Justices of the Supreme Court of Pakistan

Order	Name	Appointment	Retirement	Court of precedence	Notes
1	Yahya Afridi	28 June 2018	25 October 2027	Peshawar High Court	30th Chief Justice of Pakistan
2	Munib Akhtar	8 May 2018	13 December 2028	Sindh High Court	Contender for the 31st Chief Justice of Pakistan after the retirement of Yahya Afridi on 25 October 2027
3	Muhammad Ali Mazhar	16 August 2021	4 October 2029	Sindh High Court	Contender for the 31st Chief Justice of Pakistan after the retirement of Yahya Afridi on 25 October 2027
4	Ayesha Malik	23 January 2022	2 June 2031	Lahore High Court	Contender for the 31st Chief Justice of Pakistan after the retirement of Yahya Afridi on 25 October 2027
5	Shahid Waheed	11 November 2022	24 December 2031	Lahore High Court	
6	Irfan Saadat Khan	3 November 2023	6 February 2028	Sindh High Court	
7	Naeem Akhtar Afghan	11 March 2024	28 June 2028	Balochistan High Court	
8	Malik Shehzad Ahmed Khan	25 June 2024	24 March 2028	Lahore High Court	
9	Aqeel Ahmed Abbasi	25 June 2024	15 June 2028	Sindh High Court	
10	Shahid Bilal Hassan	25 June 2024	11 March 2030	Lahore High Court	
11	Muhammad Hashim Kakar	14 February 2025	17 September 2028	Balochistan High Court	
12	Muhammad Shafi Siddiqui	14 February 2025	11 August 2030	Sindh High Court	
13	Salahuddin Panhwar	14 February 2025	8 August 2031	Sindh High Court	
14	Shakeel Ahmad	14 February 2025	31 January 2032	Peshawar High Court	
15	Ishtiaq Ibrahim	14 February 2025	1 December 2034	Peshawar High Court	
16	Miangul Hassan Aurangzeb	2 December 2025	13 September 2035	Islamabad High Court	
17	Vacant				
18	Vacant				
19	Vacant				
20	Vacant				
21	Vacant				
22	Vacant				
23	Vacant				
24	Vacant				
25	Vacant				

Ad hoc appointments of the Shariat Appellate Bench

Order	Name listings	Appointments	Retirement	Institution of Precedence	Alma mater
26	Khalid Masud	n/a	n/a	International Islamic University	McGill University, Canada
27	Qibla Ayaz	n/a	n/a		University of Edinburgh

=== Registry and officers ===
The registry of the Supreme Court is its appointed officers who is assisted by registrars, several additional and deputy registrars, gazetted officers, and other law clerks. The registry branches provides speedy justice of all nature of crimes and disputes to the people living in remote areas in the country, while keeping the civil registry of the people.

There are five registries of the supreme court: Islamabad, Karachi, Lahore, Peshawar, and Quetta.

The Officers and Registrars are appointed by the supreme court with the approval from the chief justices of High Courts and the President and may make rules providing for the appointment by for their terms and conditions of employment that is granted by the Constitution.

=== Law clerks and supreme court advocates ===
The Supreme Court has an extensive competitive program for the appointment of the law clerks and research associates at the Supreme Court Library. The Supreme Court hires the law clerks based on the recommendations provided by their professors from their respected universities and colleges. Law clerks reviews the petitions for writ of certiorari, research them, prepare bench memorandums, and draft opinions, and reported back to the supreme court's administrative registrar. As of current, the supreme court has 10 law clerks for the 2016–17 year.

The Pakistan Bar Council provides qualification for senior advocates, barristers, lawyers, and selected civil court judges to be elevated as Advocate Supreme Court (ASC) based on individual experience, qualifications, and selected invitations.

== Court campus and facilities ==
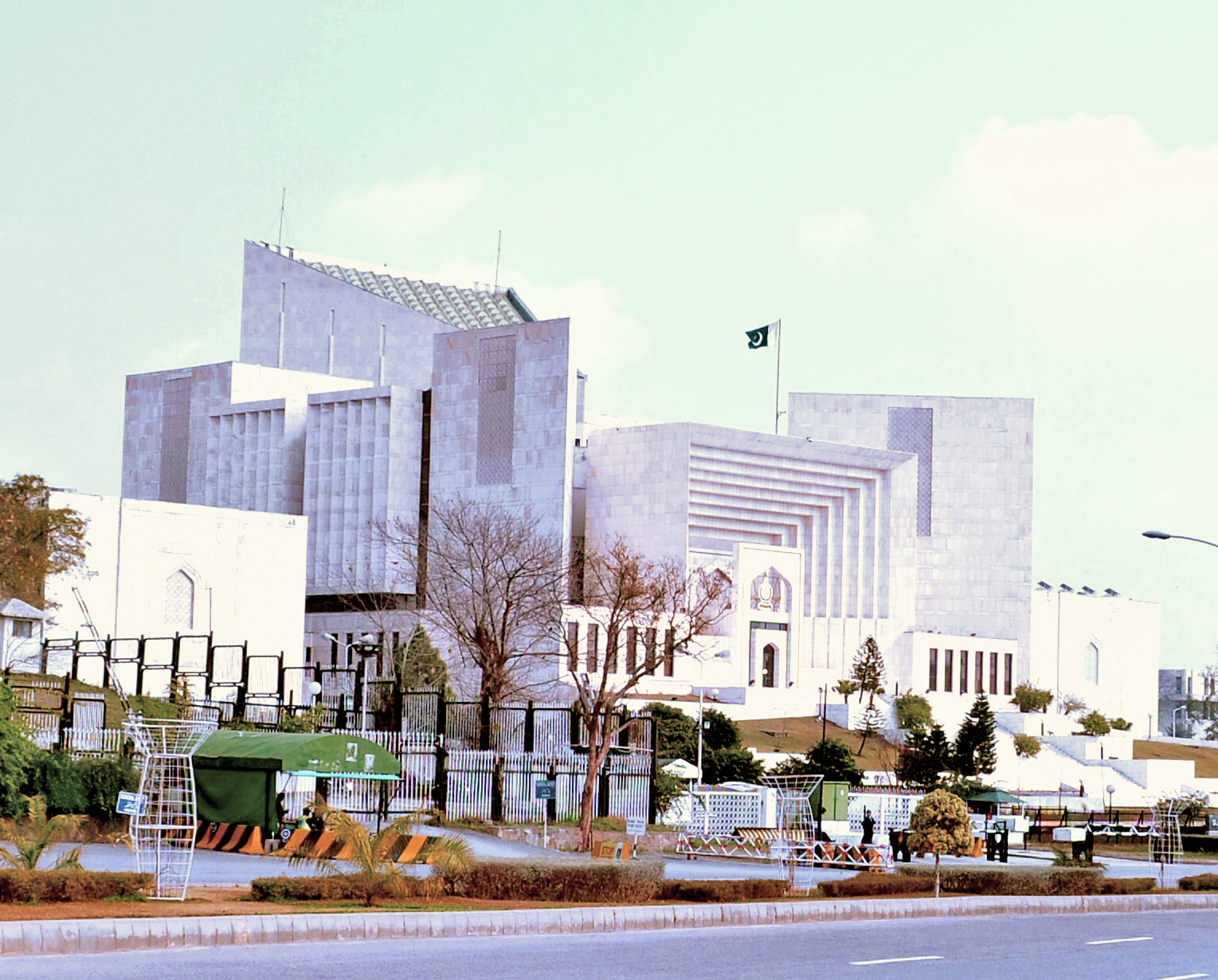
The Supreme Court of Pakistan.

The Supreme Court Building is located at the Constitution Avenue in Islamabad, flanked by the Prime Minister's Office to the south, the Presidential Palace and the Parliament Building to the north.

Initially, the Supreme Court met in Karachi and later moved to Lahore/Rawalpindi on various location until 1960 after the government moved to Islamabad. The Supreme Court building is within the ambit of the Islamabad Police, maintaining the law and order as well as campus security of the court.

The Supreme Court Building is designed by the renowned Japanese architect, Kenzo Tange, in a modernist style complementing the Parliament Building. The CDA Engineering and the Environmental Protection Agency supervised the engineering the Supreme Court's monument and civil works infrastructure throughout its lengthy construction since the 1960s. In the 1980s–90s, CDA Engineering later expanded infrastructure of the Supreme Court especially when building the Supreme Court's law library.|

The Court Complex is comprised on Main Central Block, Judges Chamber's block, and Administrative Block, covering 339,861sq. ft^{2}. Administration of the Court is supervised by the Chief Justice who exercise the powers through the Registrars, Law clerks, Librarians, and private secretaries to run the judicial functions in proper manner.

The Court complex judges' chambers, a separate building consisting of the law library, various meeting spaces, and auxiliary services including a lecture auditorium. There is an Elizabethan-styled Entrance Hall, cafeteria, conference rooms, and a vintage Dining hall, that resembles the Victorian era. The Supreme Court Library contains the collection of 72,000 law books, reports and journals is situated in the basement.

=== Supreme Court Museum ===
The Supreme Court Museum serves as an invaluable repository for preserving the judicial history of post- and pre-Independence era for future generation. The Museum's collections include fine arts, oral histories, photographs, personal belongings of judges and chief justices and an archival collection of rare documents. These collections are displayed in the permanent exhibit gallery of the Museum, as well as in temporary exhibits; surely in future these archival materials will be assets to the researchers. The idea of Supreme Court Museum was dreamt in year 2010 by Chief Justice Tassaduq Hussain Jillani and completed in the June 2016.

== Jurisdiction ==
The Supreme Court has all the original, appellate, and advisory jurisdiction on all of the country's courts – hence, the Supreme Court is the final arbitrator of all cases where the decision has been reached. In 1976, the jurisdiction of the Supreme Court was constrained and limited by the passing of the Fifth Amendment to the Constitution but its powers were originally restored in 1985 through the Eighth Amendment, which further expanded the jurisdiction of the Supreme Court.

The Supreme Court enjoys a powerful jurisdiction in the country including on the federal government, provincial governments, governmental agencies, NGOs, and where the government and governmental agencies fails to perform its mandated duty to protect the basic human rights or deviating from the law in light of taking the Suo motu notice.

From 2008 to 2013, the Supreme Court repeatedly exercise its suo motu power in a view of check and balance on the governmental authorities to prevent abuse of human rights and to prevent the miscarriage of justice.

The independent jurisdiction of the Supreme Court is taken as positive by the legal observers as an attempt of providing a fair, speedy, and public trial of authorities accused of abusing the basic human rights. Commenting of the issue of suo motu, Justice K.M. Sharif critically opined: "[Supreme Court]'s jurisdiction will take notice of every matter in which the executive is showing slackness." The Supreme Court is the only federal court that has jurisdiction over the direct appeals from high courts decisions, as powers granted by the Constitution as an appellate jurisdiction.

The Supreme Court also has an original jurisdiction in any dispute between any two or more provincial governments or the Government of Pakistan itself where the Supreme Court may pronounce declaratory judgments only to settle the disputes. However, almost all cases are brought to the Supreme Court on appeal, making the cases considered based on original jurisdiction rarely. On events involving the legal and technical issues concerning the implementation of law and the writ of constitution, Supreme Court has an advisory jurisdiction to answer questions and provides written opinions on public importance as consulted by the President upon the request from the Prime Minister.

The Supreme Court also enjoys the plenary jurisdiction and may exercise its plenary powers for passing appropriate orders to ensure the completion of its orders and to complete the justice at all levels of commands.

== Rules and process ==
=== Rulings and transfer of cases ===
The Supreme Court is empowered to frame its own rules for the purpose of regulating the practice and procedure of the Court. When the cases are determined as their final rulings, the jurists deliver their rulings in an open court, either at once or by announcing a future date to the concerned parties through their advocates upon writing their opinions during their recesses.

All cases that come before the supreme court through the writs of certiorari that are processed through the law clerks and advocates. The Supreme Court has powers to transfer any case, appeals, or other pendings proceedings before any High Courts to any subordinated court if the supreme court considers it expedient to do so in the interest of justice and speedy trial. The Supreme Court may issues advisory directions, orders, and decrees in any case or matter pending in the high courts necessary for doing the complete justice, including an order for the purpose of securing the attendance of any person or the discovery or production of any document. The directions and orders issued by the Supreme Court are finals despite questions are arises during the hearings in the High Court for the directions provided the Supreme court.

=== Oral arguments and decisions ===
When the certiorari petitions are granted by the Supreme Court, the case is then set for the oral arguments, issuing orders to advocates of concerning parties in the case of importance. If the parties, despite the opportunity granted by the court to make oral submissions, do not avail the same, the court is not bound to wait indefinitely for them and keep on adjourning the matter. During the time of the orality by either sides of the parties, the justices may interrupt the advocate and ask questions. The petitioner gives the first presentation, and may reserve some time to rebut the respondent's arguments after the respondent has concluded.

At the conclusion of oral argument, the case is submitted for the final judgements where cases are decided by majority vote of the justices. It is possible that, through recusals or vacancies, the Court divides evenly on a case, as such happened on the case Nusrat Bhutto v. Federation of Pakistan (1977–78).

=== Review petition and actions ===
Despite its final rulings, the Supreme Court may review any case upon the filing of review petition of any party to any civil and criminal case of any decisions, judgements/rulings have been pronounced by the Supreme Court. The party that filed an appealed through the supreme court advocates to the Supreme Court is the appellant and the non-mover is the respondent, where all case names before the Supreme Court are styled "petitioner/appellant vs. defendants/respondent".

All decisions that are pronounced by the supreme court, after hearing the review petitions, are considered as final rulings that are to be binding on all other courts in Pakistan. The constitution also empowers the Supreme Court to call upon any authority, either an executive or judicial, to act in aid of the Supreme Court to ensure its rulings are delivered to complete justice.

=== Published opinions and citations ===
The Supreme Court of Pakistan Press is the official authority that publishes the reportable Supreme Court's decisions and opinions, as well as judicial supplements, law reports, and bibliographies. The Supreme Court's opinions are first published and is made available on the Court's web site, in form of "press release". Secondly, comprehensive opinions and orders are bound together in paperback form in which the final version of the Court's opinions appears which is called a preliminary print of "Annual Report".

About a year after the paperbacks are published, a final and more cited volume of decision of supreme court volume of Annual Report is published and numbered whereas the researchers may cite the works in their reports.

=== Supreme Court Bar Association ===
All supreme court advocates are required to be members of the Supreme Court Bar Association in order to plead the cases before the court. Formed and established in 1989, the Bar comprises the supreme court lawyers who are elected from all over the country and is aimed to uphold the rule of law, cause of justice and protect the interest of the legal profession as well as that of public.

The Bar is governed by an executive council consisting of 22 elected members with an elected president and a secretary. Advocates can be admitted as either individuals or groups and their admission is approved by the elected president of the Bar. Members of the Supreme Court Bar Association are also granted access to the Supreme Court Library's research collection and law periodicals.

== Institutional de jure powers ==
The Supreme Court has played an influential and pivotal role in the political history of the country since its inception in 1947, and has taken constitutional role for protecting the rights in the light of "doctrine of necessity". The de jure institutional powers of the Supreme Court as outlined in the Constitution can only be understood as an exemplary of constitutional cases involving the actions of the Pakistan's military turning over the civilian government in an attempt to restore law and order to prevent chaos in the society.

In 1954, the Court under Chief Justice Moh'd Munir exercised its institutional power in a supreme court case (Maulvi Tamizuddin Khan vs. Federation of Pakistan) when it validated the dismissal of Constituent Assembly, whereas M.A. Bogra continued to serve as Prime Minister under Governor-General Sir Malik Ghulam. There were three constitutional cases overheard by the Supreme Court:

1. Federation of Pakistan et al. v. Maulvi Tamizuddin Khan
2. Usif Patel v. Two others v. The Crown
3. Special Reference made by the Governor-General of Pakistan

First, the Supreme Court validated the Governor-General's actions in case 1 but soon considered such powers as Ultra vires in case 2 and case 3. However, the Court found it legal in its jurisdiction in thrice cases when it validated the actions under the impression of "doctrine of necessity". Despite its rulings, the Court maintained its institutional authority over the Governor-General's actions and ultimately supervised the election of the Constituent Assembly which was transformed into National Assembly of Parliament that promulgated the first set of Constitution of Pakistan.

In 1969, Supreme Court justices again heard the petitions against the suspension of the second set of the Constitution when army chief General Yahya Khan took over the presidency amid the resignation of President Ayub Khan. This constitutional case cited as, "Asma Jillani v. Government of the Punjab", evenly divided the justices on this issue but bitterly approved such actions in the light of "necessity doctrine", with Chief Justice Hamoodur Rahman critically opined against this actions as he notably ruled that Yahya Khan's assumption of power was "illegal usurpation". In doing so, the Supreme Court also overruled and overturned its convictions that called for validation of martial law in 1958.

The institutional influence of Supreme Court on the political events in the country grew since 1971 after the conclusion of the War Enquiry Commission that provided far reaching insightful recommendations to prevent foreign intervention. In 1975, the institutional powers of the Supreme Court were constraint after the passing of the fifth amendment that ultimately disturbed the "checks and balances" system in the country, that eventually strain the executive and judiciary relations. In 1977, the Supreme Court courted by Chief Justice S. Anwarul Haq used the institutional powers to provide a legality to justify the actions resulted in martial law to dismiss the Prime Minister Zulfikar Ali Bhutto but decided to hear a petition to review the death sentence awarded by the Lahore High Court after the murder trial reached its conclusion. In a controversial leanings of 4:3, the Supreme Court upheld the death sentence and Zulfikar Ali Bhutto but it maintained its institutional integrity while taking many cases involving the Zia administration. The institutional de jure powers of the Supreme Court were restored to its original position after the passing of the Eighth Amendment in 1985.

After the military takeover of the civilian government, the pro-democracy organisations and PML(N)'s lawyers challenged the legality of the military takeover, asking the supreme court to review its rulings. After the lengthy court battle between Sharif's and Musharraf's lawyers, the Supreme Court was in a clear view of the military take over as "unconstitutional" but favoured the legality on necessity grounds that was viewed as very limited, on 12 May 2000.

Widely publicised case, the Nawaz Sharif vs. Federation, the supreme court relied its judgement based on the principle of salus populi est suprema lex and rejected the options of "complete surrender" to the regime or total opposition which, in its judgement, would have led to the "closure of the courts". Due to the Thirteenth Amendment removed the effective check and balance of branches of the government, the supreme court marked its reference using the "Necessitas facit licitum quod alias non-est licitum" and asserted on the right of the Superior Courts to review the orders, proceedings, acts, and legislative measures of the Musharraf regime. In addition, the situation was termed by the supreme court as a "case of constitutional deviation for a transitional period", and accepted Musharraf's argument for holding the national elections within two-to-three years, giving Musharraf until 12 May 2002 to hold new elections. While issuing a lengthy judgement, the supreme court effectively established its institutional authority on Musharraf as it reserved for its right to review and re-examine the continuation of Musharraf's emergency powers.

Before this judgement, Musharraf did not hint a timetable for the restoration of democracy – having argued that it needed an indefinite and possibly prolonged time to reform the country – Musharraf publicly submitted to the Court's judgement. Several of Pakistani legal theorists have posited that Pakistan's "grundnorm", the basis for its Constitutional convention and system of laws, continues in effect (and the Supreme Court therefore retains its authority) even when the written constitution is suspended by the imposition of a military dictablanda.

=== Contempt of court ===
The Constitution empowers the Supreme Court to exercise its powers of contempt of court to punish any person or an authority found of scandalising, abusing, interfering, and obstructing the procedures of the court or its rulings. In 2001–2002, there were additional amendments made that further empowers the Supreme Court and its institutional powers to struck any federal authority found on the charges of contempt of court.

In a much publicised case, the Supreme Court effectively used its constitutional powers when it ceased Prime Minister Yousaf Raza Gillani from running the government when the court found him guilty of contempt of court charges– hench disqualified the prime minister from holding any public offices in the country.

== Literary criticism of the Supreme Court ==
The Supreme Court has been given literary criticism by historians and authors of history of Pakistan for validating the martial law against the elected governments of Pakistan by the military interventions.

=== Lawyer's movement, long march, and judicial activism ===
In 2007, it was reported widely by the Pakistani news media that the Military Intelligence officials, acting under then-President and army chief General Pervez Musharraf, were using photographs of the justices involved with prostitutes to blackmail and pressurise the supreme court justices to take the oath of allegiance and make rulings favourable to the then-President Musharraf.

The Lawyer's movement, allied with the rule of Law movement led by PML(N), eventually called for a successful long march to have to justices of the supreme court restored before the state of emergency imposed in 2007. Led under the direction of PML(N) President Nawaz Sharif, now the Prime Minister, the long march effectively restored the supreme court justices when Prime Minister Yousuf Raza Gilani appeared on national television, only to announce unconditional restoration of the judiciary.

With immediate effect on 17 March 2009, Justices Javaid Iqbal, Ijaz Ahmed, K. R. Ramday, and Raja Muhammad Fayyaz Ahmad were restored to their position as of 2 November 2007 with Justice Iftikhar Mohammad Chaudhry assuming the post of Chief Justice on 22 March 2009. News media pundits eventually noted that it was General Tariq Majid, then-Chairman joint chiefs, and General Ashfaq Parvez Kayani, then-army chief, had played an ambiguous role in intervening and encouraging a rapprochement between the government and the opposition. Neither side acknowledged this role, however, until lawyers' movement leader Aitezaz Ahsan publicly admitted Kayani's role. There were mass speculations that protestors and law enforcement agencies would have violently collided otherwise had they not intervened.

The restoration of the justices that resulted from the immense public pressure led to the judiciary to begin a quest for independence with an aim to ensure a strong and efficient judicial system that could quickly deliver justice to the public. The Supreme Court took notice of several important constitutional and other cases in the period that related to the public interest. These cases of importance included the constitutional petitions and judgements on:

  - Constitution Petition No. 8 & 9 of 2009
  - Dr. Mubashir Hussain vs. Federation of Pakistan
  - Missing Person vs. the Federation of Pakistan et al.
  - Petitioners vs. Federation of Pakistan et al.
  - Steel Workers Union vs. Federation of Pakistan et al.
  - Applicants vs. NICL et al.

The Supreme Court rendered its judgement declare the appointments based upon PCO on 3 November 2007 as null and void as well as declaring the NRO as also null and voided that ultimately opened the investigations and cases against then-President Asif Ali Zardari and Prime Minister Gillani.

The Supreme Court became extremely vigilant on corruption cases related to the Gillani ministry, effectively led to the government shutdown and critics noted that the judicial activism slowed of government productivity without corruption has created a tension between the Chaudhry Court and the Gillani ministry in 2008 till 2013.

=== Constitutional petitions No. 8 and 9 of 2009 ===
Of the 14 justices that rendered a verdict related to taking an oath under the PCO, 12 had taken the oath themselves. However, they controversially did not apply the judgement to themselves.

Name	Status
Mr. Justice Iftikhar Muhammad Chaudhry, CJ.	Took Oath on PCO as Chief Justice Balochistan High Court on 26 January 2000
Mr. Justice Javed Iqbal	Took Oath on PCO as Judge of Balochistan High Court on 26 January 2000
Mr. Justice Sardar Muhammad Raza Khan	Took Oath on PCO as Judge of Peshawar High Court on 26 January 2000
Mr. Justice Khalil-ur-Rehman Ramday	Took Oath on PCO as Judge of Lahore High Court on 26 January 2000
Mr. Justice Mian Shakirullah Jan	Took Oath on PCO as Judge of Peshawar High Court on 26 January 2000
Mr. Justice Tassaduq Hussain Jillani	Took Oath on PCO as Judge of Lahore High Court on 26 January 2000
Mr. Justice Nasir-ul-Mulk	Took Oath on PCO as Judge of Peshawar High Court on 26 January 2000
Mr. Justice Raja Fayyaz Ahmed	Took Oath on PCO as Judge of Balochistan High Court on 26 January 2000
Mr. Justice Ch. Ijaz Ahmed	Took Oath on PCO as Judge of Lahore High Court on 26 January 2000
Mr. Justice Ghulam Rabbani	Took Oath on PCO as Judge of Sindh High Court on 26 January 2000
Mr. Justice Sarmad Jalal Osmany	Took Oath on PCO as Judge of Sindh High Court on 26 January 2000
Mr. Justice Muhammad Sair Ali Khattak	Appointed as a Judge of the Lahore High Court Lahore on 2 May 2001
Mr. Justice Mahmood Akhtar Shahid Siddiqui	Appointed as a Judge of the Lahore High Court Lahore on 21 September 2001
Mr. Justice Jawwad S. Khawaja.	Took Oath on PCO as Judge of Lahore High Court on 26 January 2000 Mr. Justice Anwar Zaheer Jamali Took Oath on PCO as Judge of Sindh High Court on 26 January 2000

As a result of the 31 July 2009 decision handed down in the case of Constitutional Petitions 8 and 9 of 2009, the following justices resigned before their cases were referred to Supreme Judicial Council:

Name	Appointed	Status on 2 Nov 2007	PCO oath, Result of Judgement
Faqir Muhammad Khokhar	10 January 2002.	Supreme Court Judge	Khokkhar resigned from the Court on 5 August 2009. His normal retirement would have been 15 April 2010
Justice M. Javed Buttar	29 July 2004	Supreme Court Judge	Buttar resigned from the Court on 5 August 2009. His normal retirement would have been 15 November 2013

In addition to the above justices, the following justices were removed from the Supreme Court of Pakistan on the ground that their appointment to the court was made without consultation with the de jure Chief Justice of Pakistan.

Name	Appointed	Status on 2 Nov 2007	PCO oath, Result of Judgement
Justice Muhammad Qaim Jan Khan	6 November 2007	Peshawar High Court Judge	Khan became a Supreme Court justice on 6 November 2007. He was removed and deemed to have retired as a judge.
Justice Ijaz-ul-Hassan	6 November 2007	Peshawar High Court Judge	Ijaz-ul-Hassan became a Supreme Court justice 6 November 2007. He was removed and deemed to have retired as a judge.
Justice Mohammad Moosa K. Legari	6 November 2007	Judge Sindh High Court	Legari became a Supreme Court justice 6 November 2007. He was removed and deemed to have retired as a judge.
Justice Ch. Ejaz Yousaf	6 November 2007	Chairman Press Council	Yousaf was a retired Chief Justice of the Federal Shariat Court before he became a Supreme Court justice. He was removed from the bench.
Justice Zia Perwez	13 November 2007	Judge Sindh High Court	Perwez became a Supreme Court justice 13 November 2007. Perwez was removed and reinstated as a judge for the Sindh High Court.
Justice Mian Hamid Farooq	10 December 2007	Lahore High Court Judge	Farooq became a Supreme Court justice 10 December 2007. He was removed and deemed to have retired as a judge.
Justice Syed Sakhi Hussain Bokhari	10 December 2007	Lahore High Court Judge	Bokhari became a Supreme Court justice 10 December 2007. He was removed and reinstated as a judge for the Lahore High Court.
Justice Syed Zawwar Hussain Jaffery	10 December 2007	Retired Sindh High court Judge	Jaffery became a Supreme Court justice 10 December 2007. He was removed and deemed to have retired as a judge.
Justice Sheikh Hakim Ali	8 February 2008	Lahore High Court Judge	Ali became a Supreme Court justice 8 February 2008. He was removed and deemed to have retired as a judge.
Justice Muhammad Furrukh Mahmud	8 February 2008	Retired Lahore High Court Judge	Mahmud became a Supreme Court justice 8 February 2008. He was removed from the bench.
Hon. Sarmad Jalal Osmany	19 September 2008	Sindh High Court Judge	Osmany refused the PCO oath and was appointed to Supreme Court on 19 September 2008. He was removed from the bench of Supreme Court and reverted to a Sindh High Court Judge. He was then appointed as Chief Justice of Sindh High Court on 1 August 2009.
Justice Sardar Muhammad Aslam	7 March 2009	Lahore High Court Judge	Aslam took the PCO oath on 3 November 2007 and became a Supreme Court Justice on 7 March 2009. He was removed and deemed to have retired.

==== Controversial aspect of the decision ====
The decision of the Court summarily removed all justices of the higher judiciary who were not part of it as of 2 November 2007. Their removal was ordered on the grounds that the de jure Chief Justice was not allowed to advise in these cases. In the same decision the court held that the de jure Chief Justice from 3 November 2007 to 22 March 2009 was Justice Chaudhry.

There were three groups of removed justices:

- Those elevated to higher courts who initially took oath under the PCO
- Those who were elevated to higher courts after restoration of the Constitution and were appointed by Musharraf
- Those who were elevated to higher courts after restoration of the Constitution and were appointed by Asif Ali Zardari

The Supreme Court bench that rendered the decision consisted entirely of justices who had taken oath under the PCO of 1999 themselves, but were already sitting justices of the higher judiciary at the time and had taken a constitutional oath. The 1999 PCO and decisions made under it were given constitutional protection by Seventeenth amendment.

This decision has resulted in situations where:

1. newly appointed justices who never took any sort of oath under any PCO have been removed
2. sitting justices who took an oath under the 2007 PCO are still acting as justices, though their cases will be sent to Supreme Judicial Council
3. sitting justices who were reappointed and took oath under Justice Dogar are still acting as justices with no action
4. justices who took oath under the PCO of 1999 are still functioning as justices of higher judiciary

Critics of the decision question the fact that some PCO judges are still working and some non-PCO judges have been sacked.

==== Review petition filed by Lahore High Court non-PCO removed judges ====
Removed ad hoc judges of the Lahore High Court have filed several petitions in the Supreme Court in Lahore for review of its judgment, which sent 76 judges of Supreme Courts and High Courts immediately home.

These judges argue that they were qualified to be appointed as judges of the High Court in accordance with the requirements of Article 193(2)of the 1973 Constitution and were offered to serve as ad hoc judges following the consultation required under the Constitution. They accepted the offer and took oath when the state of emergency was lifted. They never took oath under a PCO and continued performing the functions of judges of the High Court until judgement was rendered against them.

These judges were appointed by Lahore High Court Chief Justice Justice Zahid Hussain, who is still a justice of the Supreme Court of Pakistan and is not being tried before the Supreme Judicial Counsel.

The petition also noted that none of the sacked judges were made parties to the decision against them, nor were they able to comment in the hearing or in some cases aware that the hearing was taking place. They also allege that no copy of the decision was sent to the High Court or to the judges concerned.

==== Key controversial points ====
According one news article, the Supreme Court applied its judgement retroactively, having effect from 3 November 2007. The 14-member Supreme Court bench did not, however, apply the sanction to judges who took oath under the 1999 PCO. Some of these are current justices, and some have not yet taken a constitutional oath.

Critics of the decision also argue that it is inconsistent with the principles laid down in Malik Asad Ali's case where it was held that the Chief Justice was bound by the Court's judgement. Chief Justice Sajjad Ali Shah was removed from office based on this case.

Inconsistently with the decision, the present Chief Justice Chaudhry accepted the stance of the government that Justice Dogar was the Chief Justice until his retirement.

Following the decision, the official website of the Supreme Court was hacked by an unknown person. The hacked website made derogatory remarks about Chief Justice Chaudhry.

== See also ==
- Attorney General of Pakistan
- Federal Shariat Court
- List of justices of the Supreme Court of Pakistan
- List of cases of the Supreme Court of Pakistan
- Law of Pakistan
- Ministry of Law & Justice of Pakistan
- Minister of Law & Justice Pakistan
- The Pakistan Bar Council and the five province-level bar councils:
  - Balochistan Bar Council
  - Islamabad Bar Council
  - Khyber Pakhtunkhwa Bar Council
  - Punjab Bar Council
  - Sindh Bar Council
- Supreme Court Bar Association of Pakistan and the provincial High Court Bar Associations:
  - Lahore High Court Bar Association
  - Lahore Bar Association
- The five High Courts of Pakistan:
  - Balochistan High Court
  - Islamabad High Court
  - Lahore High Court
  - Peshawar High Court
  - Sindh High Court
  - Gilgit-Baltistan Supreme Appellate Court
