= Shakeel Ahmad (judge) =

Justice of the Peshawar High Court

Justice of the Peshawar High Court
- In office 16 June 2017 – 13 February 2025

Personal details
- Born: 1 February 1967 (age 59) East Pakistan
- Education: University of Peshawar; Khyber Law College; S. M. Law College

Shakeel Ahmad (born 1 February 1967) is a Pakistani jurist, who has been serving as a justice of the Supreme Court of Pakistan since 14 February 2025. Previously, he served as a judge of the Peshawar High Court from 16 June 2017 until his elevation to the Supreme Court.

== Early life and education ==
Ahmad was born in East Pakistan on 1 February 1967. He earned his Bachelor of Arts from the University of Peshawar in 1986 and his LLB from Khyber Law College in 1990. He later completed his LL.M. from S. M. Law College in 2001.

== Legal career ==
Ahmad began his legal career by enrolling as an Advocate on 13 February 1991. He became an Advocate of the High Court in 1993 and was later admitted as an Advocate of the Supreme Court of Pakistan in 2004. He served as the State Counsel for the Government of Khyber Pakhtunkhwa in the Supreme Court of Pakistan starting from 2006. Ahmad was also appointed as the Legal Advisor for several organisations, including the Hayatabad Medical Complex, the Post Graduate Medical Institute Peshawar, and Lady Reading Hospital. Additionally, he held the position of Special Prosecutor for the Anti-Narcotics Force from 2009 to 2012. He has authored several legal publications, such as Industrial Relations Laws and The Laws on Shamilat.

== Judicial career ==
Ahmad was elevated to the Bench as an Additional Judge of the Peshawar High Court on 16 June 2017. He became a permanent judge of the High Court on 31 May 2019. He was appointed as a Justice of the Supreme Court of Pakistan on 10 February 2025.
