= Fazal Akbar =

Pakistani Chief Justice

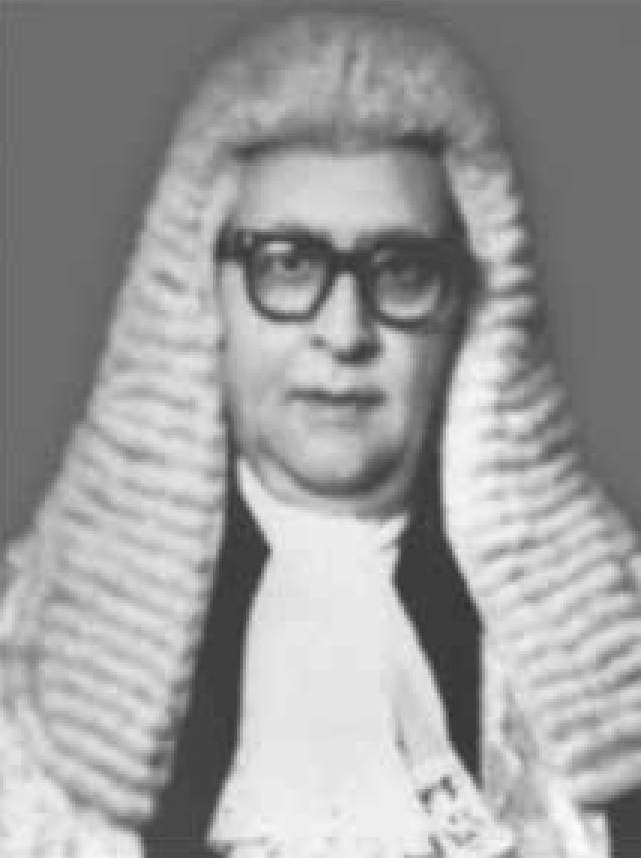

6th Chief Justice of Pakistan
- In office 4 June 1968 – 17 November 1968
- Appointed by: Ayub Khan
- Preceded by: Sheikh Abdur Rehman
- Succeeded by: Hamoodur Rahman

Personal details
- Born: November 1903
- Education: University of Calcutta; Inns of Court School of Law

Fazal-e-Akbar (born November 1903, date of death unknown) was the 6th Chief Justice of Pakistan for 5 months from 4 June 1968 till 17 November 1968.

== Education and career ==
He graduated in arts from St. Xavier College, Calcutta, British India. He graduated in law from University of Calcutta and was called to the bar at Lincoln's Inn, London in 1930.

He started his career as a lawyer at Fort William High Court in 1931. From 1931 to 1943 he also taught Jurisprudence at the University of Calcutta. In 1943, he was appointed District and Sessions Judge, in which capacity he worked till 1946.

After the partition of India he became Special Officer of the Judicial Department and Registrar East Pakistan High Court. In 1949 he was elevated as the Judge of the High Court of East Pakistan. Justice Fazal-e-Akbar was deputed as Chairman Railway Tribunal in 1950 and Chairman University Commission in 1954.

He was elevated to the Supreme Court of Pakistan in May 1960. Justice Fazal-e-Akbar became the sixth Chief Justice of Pakistan replacing Dr. Justice S.A. Rehman on 4 June 1968. He retired on 17 November 1968.

== See also ==
- Chief Justices of Pakistan
- Supreme Court of Pakistan

Legal offices
Preceded by Sheikh Abdur Rehman	Chief Justice of Pakistan; 1968	Succeeded by Hamoodur Rahman
