= National Library of Pakistan =

National and research library in the vicinity of the Red Zone, Islamabad, Pakistan

Coordinates: 33°43′36″N 73°06′06″E

National Library
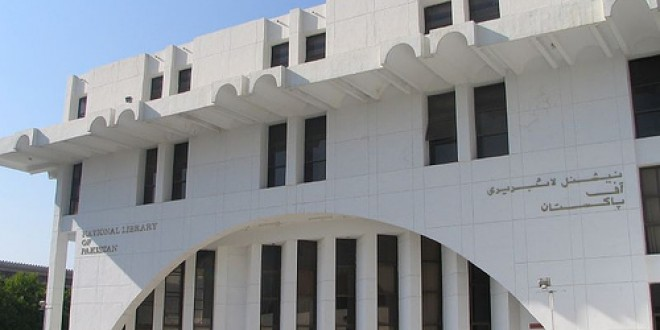
- Location: Isfahani Road, Red Zone, Islamabad, Pakistan, Pakistan
- Type: Research and Depository
- Established: 1951 (75 years ago); Reconstituted in 1993
- Branch of: N/A

Collection
- Items collected: ~200,000 catalogued books in the Library system 580 hand written ancient manuscripts and over 10,000 key text on the history of Urdu, Arabic, Persian, and English languages; 55,836 book on science and technology; ~40,000 bound volumes of newspapers and periodicals
- Size: 300,000

Access and use
- Circulation: Library does not publicly circulate
- Population served: 442 members of the Parliament of Pakistan, their staff, and members of the public

Other information
- Budget: ₨.60.2 million
- Director: Ch. Muhammad Nazir; Chief National Librarian
- Employees: ~178
- Website: www.nlp.gov.pk/index.html

The National Library of Pakistan (Urdu:قومى کتب خانہ پاکستان) is located in the vicinity of the Red Zone, Islamabad, Pakistan. Argued to be the country's oldest cultural institution, the library is a leading resource for information— ancient and new. The National Library collection includes approximately 66% of all serial and 50-55% of all books publications in the country.

Designed in Eastern architectural style, the library includes space for 500 readers, has 15 research rooms, a 450-seat auditorium, and provides computer and microfilm services. At its opening in 1993, the library owned a collection of 130,000 volumes and 600 manuscripts. The National Library's mission is to promote literacy and serve as a dynamic cultural and educational center for the state's capital Islamabad.

== History ==
Authorization for a national library can be traced back to 1949, although it was not established until 1951 under the secretariat of the Ministry of Education (MoEd). However, there was no physical library infrastructure until 1954 when the National Library merged with the existing Liaquat Memorial Library in Karachi, and was renamed the Liaquat National Library (LNL). Plans began to move the library to Islamabad in 1963, and 1968 saw the separation of the Liaquat and National libraries, with the latter relocated to Pakistan's new capital, Islamabad. The library was housed in a series of rented structures until construction of a permanent building was completed in 1988. The formal opening took place on 24 August 1993. Scholar Syed Jalaluddin Haider dates the library's existence later, to April 1999, when the 100,000-volume collection housed by the Department of Libraries was physically moved into the new building.

In 1962, the library received the right of transference of all copyrighted works to be deposited into its collections. In 1963, the Library began receiving two copies of all books, maps, illustrations and diagrams printed in Pakistan as part of the ordinance. During the Indo-Pakistani War of 1971, the library was thinned with the creation of Bangladesh with key material being transferred to Bangladesh. After a period of slow growth in its reconstruction, the library began to enlarge its size and importance in the country. Development culminated in the 1980s with an expensive and separated national library building within the vicinity of the Supreme Court's library. It gained more significance in 1992 with the promulgation of copyright (amendment) act 1992. In addition to deposited collections that began in 1993, clauses to include electronic publications as deposit material were also being added to the Copyright law in 2014.

== See also ==
- List of libraries
- National Library of Turkey
