= Fifth Amendment to the Constitution of Pakistan =

Amendment to the Pakistani constitution

The Fifth Amendment to the Constitution of Pakistan (Urdu: آئین پاکستان میں پانچویں ترمیم) was adopted on 5 September 1976, by the elected Parliament of Pakistan under the democratic government of Zulfikar Ali Bhutto.

The V Amendment widened the scope of restrictions in the Constitution of Pakistan on the Pakistan High Courts to strip powers of the High Courts to enforce the grants of natural fundamental rights explained in Chapter I, Part II of the Constitution. This amendment also imposed the import and sales tax on the consumer product. V Amendment also restricted the eligibility of the Governor or the Chief minister of those who are not from the provinces in which they have contested elections for their respective offices. V Amendment also set the maximum age of the Chief Justice as well as the term of serving the respected office.

== Text of amendment ==
'''V Amendment, Article 101 of the Constitution''': Provided that, after the holding of the first general election to the National Assembly, a person shall not be appointed to be the Governor of the Province of which he is a permanent resident.

'''V Amendment, Article 160 of the Constitution:''' Taxes are imposed on the sales and purchases of goods imported, exported, produced, manufactured or consumed.

'''V Amendment, Article 179 of the Constitution''': The Chief Justice of the Supreme Court, whether appointed before or after the commencement of the Constitution (Fifth Amendment, shall, unless he sooner attains the age of sixty-five years, hold office for a term of five years and shall thereafter have the option either to retire from his office and receive the pension to which he would have been entitled if he had retired from office on attaining the age of sixty-five years; or to assume the office of the most senior of the other Judges of the Supreme Court and to continue to receive the same salary which he was receiving while holding the office of Chief Justice.

'''V Amendment, Article 192 of the Constitution. ''': The Sind and Baluchistan High Court shall cease to function as a common High Court for the Provinces of Baluchistan and Sind. The President shall, by Order, establish a High Court for each of the Provinces of Baluchistan and Sind and may make such provision in the order of the principal seats of the two High Courts, transfer of the Judges of the common High Court, transfer of cases pending in the common High Court immediately before the establishment of the two High Courts and, generally, for matters consequential or ancillary to the common High Court ceasing to function and the establishment of the two High Courts as he may deem fit."

— CONSTITUTION (FIFTH AMENDMENT) ACT, 1976
