= Siemens Pakistan =

Pakistani subsidiary of Siemens

- Company type: Public
- Traded as: PSX: SIEM
- Industry: Engineering
- Founded: 1953; 73 years ago
- Headquarters: Karachi, Pakistan
- Area served: Pakistan
- Key people: Syed Muhammad Daniyal, MD; Syed Muhammad Ahsan Ghazali; CFO
- Products: Industrial and buildings automation, PLM software
- Services: Business services, project and construction management
- Revenue: ▲ Rs. 35.166 billion (US$130 million) (2024)
- Operating income: ▼ Rs. 156.396 million (US$560,000) (2024)
- Net income: ▼ Rs. −2.048 billion (US$−7.3 million) (2024)
- Total assets: ▼ Rs. 31.497 billion (US$110 million) (2024)
- Total equity: ▼ Rs. 5.396 billion (US$19 million) (2024)
- Owner: Siemens AG (92.40%)
- Number of employees: 487 (2024)
- Parent: Siemens
- Website: siemens.com.pk
- Footnotes / references Financials as of 30 September 2024

Siemens (Pakistan) Engineering Company Limited is a Pakistani engineering services company headquartered in Karachi. It is a subsidiary of Siemens AG.

Active since 1953, Siemens Pakistan is one of the largest providers of engineering services and management in the country, with overseeing ongoing projects in healthcare, defence development, energy, telecommunications, computer expansion and heavy construction management.

== History ==
Siemens presence in the region dates back to 1870 with the construction of the Indo-European telegraph line from London to Calcutta. Siemens established its first office in the area now known as Pakistan in 1922.

In 1952, Siemens formed a joint venture with the Government of Pakistan to establish the Telephone Industries of Pakistan (TIP), a telephone equipment manufacturing company, with 30 percent stake. TIP produced rotary telephones branded with "TIP" on their dials, which were commonly used in many Pakistani households during the 1990s and earlier. These telephones were manufactured at the TIP facility in Haripur, which was established with Siemens' assistance. Siemens formally incorporated its subsidiary in Pakistan as a private limited company in 1953, and later reorganized as a public limited company in 1963. When founded, Siemens Pakistan was originally focused on providing the network of communications, but its role in the energy sector has grown since 1987.

In July 1978, Siemens was listed on the Karachi Stock Exchange.

In 1997, Siemens established awards for engineering students across Pakistani universities and a three-year apprenticeship course for students in Karachi.

By 2002, over 50 percent of telephone networks in Pakistan were using Siemens Pakistan's EWSD technology.

In 2005, Siemens acquired Carrier Telephone Industries from PTCL under the privatization scheme of the Government of Pakistan.

In 2008, Siemens Pakistan expanded its operations to Afghanistan after acquiring the local assets from Siemens India.

In April 2015, Siemens sold its distribution transformer manufacturing business along with assets of land and building in Sindh Industrial and Trading Estate for $32 million. In August 2015, Siemens Pakistan decided to transfer its healthcare business sector to a private limited company headquartered in Lahore, Pakistan. In December 2015, healthcare business ownership was transferred to the German company Siemens Healthcare. During the same period, it closed down its diesel-generating sets business and non-standard motor business segments.

In October 2024, Siemens Pakistan further reduced its operations in Pakistan and sold its energy business to Siemens Gamesa for PKR 17.8 billion.

== Services ==
- Energy management
- Digital factory
- Process industries and drive

== Management ==
=== CEOs ===
- Sohail Wajahat Siddiqui
- Ali Hamdani
