= Supreme Court of Pakistan library =

Supreme Court of Pakistan Library
- کتابخانه عدالتِ عظمیٰ پاکستان
- The Supreme Court of Pakistan building
- 33°43′33″N 73°06′01″E
- Location: Islamabad, Pakistan
- Type: Research, Reference
- Established: 1956
- Branch of: Supreme Court of Pakistan

Collection
- Items collected: All England Law Reports; Halsbury's Laws of England
- Size: ~80,000
- Legal deposit: Supreme Court

Access and use
- Access requirements: All courts' system

Other information
- Director: Saleem Ahmad; Librarian
- Website: Official website (PDF)

The Library of the Supreme Court of Pakistan is an official and principal research as well as reference library of the Supreme Court of Pakistan. It is located in the judicial complex of the Supreme Court, and is listed as a repute of national legal Library.

Since its establishment, it has become one of the noted and reliable law libraries in the country, with resources that span the ages and cover virtually every jurisdiction and history of law. Currently the Library has a collection of ~80,000 volumes on a variety of topics including general books, legal textbooks, law reports and research journals. Almost all the local law reports are available from the date of their publication.

The All India Reports (AIR) as well as All England Law Reports and Halsbury's Laws of England are also some of the important documents available in the Library. The Library also contains reference books such as the encyclopaedias, maps, and dictionaries.

== Online sources ==
=== Database sources ===
- Judges Library
- Supreme Court of Pakistan
