= Hamoodur Rahman Commission Report =

Pakistani report on the 1971 war with India

Pakistan Before 1971

The Hamoodur Rahman Commission Report (or War Enquiry Report) contains the government of Pakistan's official and classified papers of the events leading up to secession of East Pakistan and the 1971 war with India. Hamood ur Rahman Commission was set up by then President Zulfiqar Ali Bhutto on 26 December 1971. Initially, there were 12 copies of the report prepared by the Chief Justice Hamoodur Rahman; all were destroyed except one. That single report was handed over to the government, which forbade its publication at the time. The report was leaked eventually by the Pakistani and Indian newspapers, including Dawn, drawing the attention of the public to its front pages in 2000. An editorial entitled, "Gen Agha Mohammad Yahya Khan - 4" written by Ardeshir Cowasjee on the basis of the Hamoodur Rahman Commission Report, demonstrated that "three men principally (had been) responsible for the loss, at the end of 1971, of half of Jinnah's Pakistan— end of story."

The "Supplementary Report", created after the prisoners of war returned from their two-year captivity, was published online.

== See also ==
- Classified information in Pakistan
