= Red Zone (Islamabad) =

Governmental zone in Islamabad, Pakistan

- Governmental Zone
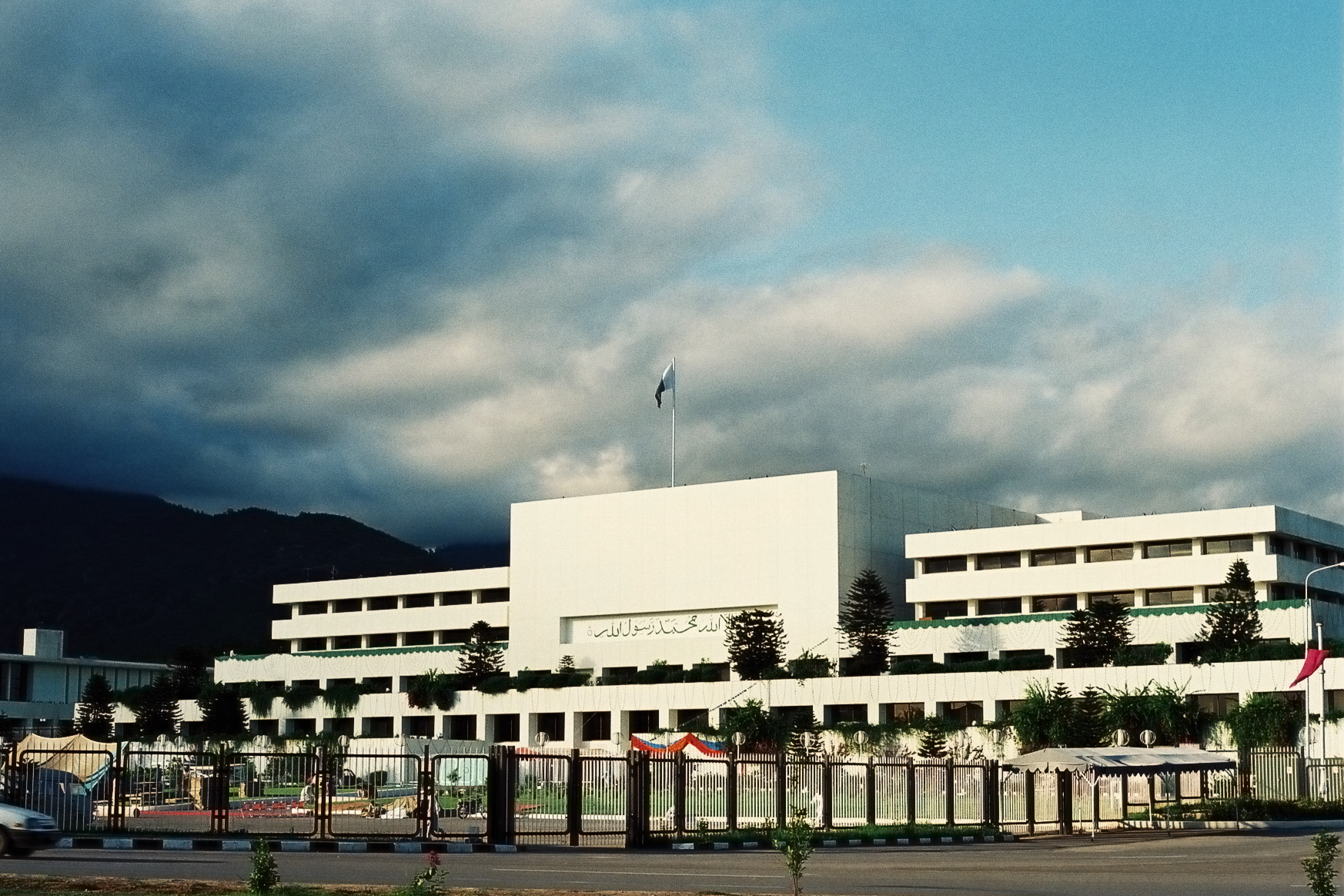
- Left-to-right: Parliament of Pakistan, Supreme Court of Pakistan

- Location within Pakistan
- Coordinates: 33°41′35″N 73°03′50″E
- Country: Pakistan
- Adm. Unit: Islamabad Capital Territory
- Constructed: 1960
- Established: 14 August 1967; 59 years ago

Government
  - Type: Islamabad Metropolitan Corporation
  - Mayor: None (vacant) (Note: Administrator system was implemented for 6 months before next local bodies election and Deputy Commissioner, Islamabad was given additional charge as Administrator in absence of Mayor on 28 October 2021.)
  - Deputy Mayor: None (vacant)
  - Deputy Commissioner: Irfan Nawaz Memon
- Time zone: UTC+05:00 (PKT)
- Postcode: 44000
- Area code: 051
- Website: ictadministration.gov.pk

The Red Zone is a governmental zone in Islamabad, the capital of Pakistan, which houses the highest executive, judicial and legislative authority buildings of the country. It is where the President and Prime Minister of Pakistan reside. It houses diplomatic embassies and federal buildings with the highest authority.

The main North-South streets in the Red Zone are Constitution Avenue, Third Avenue, and Fourth Avenue.

Pakistan buildings governmental in the Red Zone include: Parliament of Pakistan, Pakistan Secretariat, Aiwan-e-Sadr, Prime Minister's Secretariat, Supreme Court of Pakistan, National Library of Pakistan, Election Commission of Pakistan, Federal Ministries and Departments.

== See also ==
- Diplomatic Enclave, Islamabad
