= Aiwan-e-Sadr =

Official residence and workplace of the President of Pakistan

- ایوانِ صدر
- Presidential standard

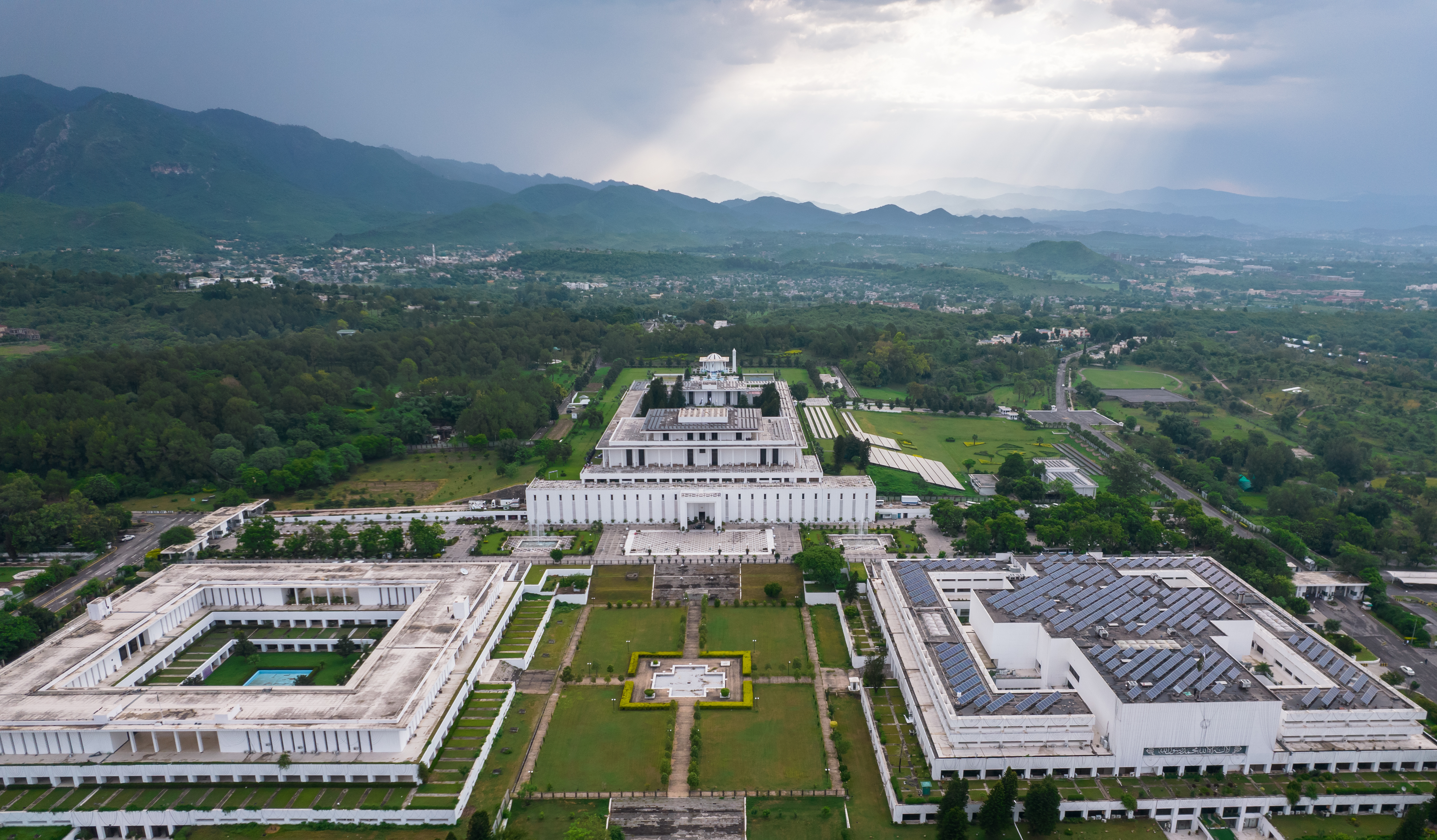
- Aerial photograph of Aiwan-e-Sadr
- Interactive map of the Aiwan-e-Sadr area
- Alternative names: Presidential Palace

General information
- Architectural style: Modern
- Location: Constitution Avenue, Red Zone, Islamabad, Islamabad, Pakistan
- Coordinates: 33°41′35″N 73°03′50″E
- Current tenants: Asif Ali Zardari (President of Pakistan)
- Construction started: 1970; 56 years ago
- Completed: 1981; 45 years ago
- Opened: 1988; 38 years ago
- Owner: Government of Pakistan

Design and construction
- Architect: Edward Durell Stone

Website
- president.gov.pk

The Aiwan-e-Sadr (Urdu: ایوانِ صدر, lit. 'President's Palace') is the official residence and workplace of the president of Pakistan. It is situated in the Red Zone in Islamabad on the Constitution Avenue, between the Parliament House and the Pakistan Secretariat.

Residences for the presidential staff, known as the President's Colony, are also located behind the presidency, adjacent to 4th Avenue.

The administrative head of Aiwan-e-Sadr is the principal secretary to the president of Pakistan, a position being held by Inamullah Dharejo since September 2025.

== History ==
Prior to Aiwan-e-Sadr's construction, the presidents of Pakistan lived in the Prince Palace located on the Mall in Rawalpindi. That building now houses the Fatima Jinnah Women University.

The construction of the building commenced in 1970, and took 11 years to complete. President Muhammad Zia-ul-Haq inaugurated it, but he lived instead in the Army House on Jhelum Road, Rawalpindi since he was also the Chief of Army Staff. Therefore, the first president to live there was Ghulam Ishaq Khan, in 1988. Presidents Farooq Leghari, Muhammad Rafiq Tarar, Asif Ali Zardari, Mamnoon Hussain, and Arif Alvi also used it as their official residence. President Pervez Musharraf never lived in the palace, as he was also the army chief, and therefore lived in the Army House, which had by then shifted to the old Prime Minister House.

Currently, President Asif Ali Zardari, lives there.

== Building complex ==
The building is built in a modern step pyramid architectural style. There are four main halls, each named after one of the Founding Fathers of Pakistan: Jinnah Hall, Liaquat Hall, Johar Hall, and Nishtar Hall.

The adjacent gardens have been designed on the lines of the old Mughal gardens, and contain fountains as well as a zoo. The zoo was opened in 2008, and once housed monkeys, deer, nilgai, zebras, and pheasants. The current menagerie consists of chinkara, deer, urial, pigeons, grey parrots, and pigeons, and pheasants. A stable, housing around a hundred horses, is also present nearby.

== Green Presidency Initiative ==
After assuming office in 2018, President Alvi launched the Green Presidency Initiative to reduce the building's energy consumption, and to shift it to renewable energy. On 15 October 2022, the Aiwan-e-Sadr received the ISO 50001 EnMS certification, which made it the world's first green presidency. The savings from energy conservation and clean energy generation were reported to be equivalent to 3,154,750 kWh, reduction of 3,144 tonnes of greenhouse gases, or plantation of 142,909 mature trees.

The building also received a GBC SEED Platinum certification from the Green Building Council due to its electricity requirements being fulfilled by a 1 MW solar system.

== Public access ==
Aiwan-e-Sadr is usually out of bounds for the general public owing to its sensitive nature. However, in recent years, it has been opened for public twice – on 8 December 2018 and 1 January 2022.

== See also ==
- List of palaces in Pakistan
