= Pakistan Secretariat =

Pakistan Secretariat دفترِمتعمد پاکستان
- Sector
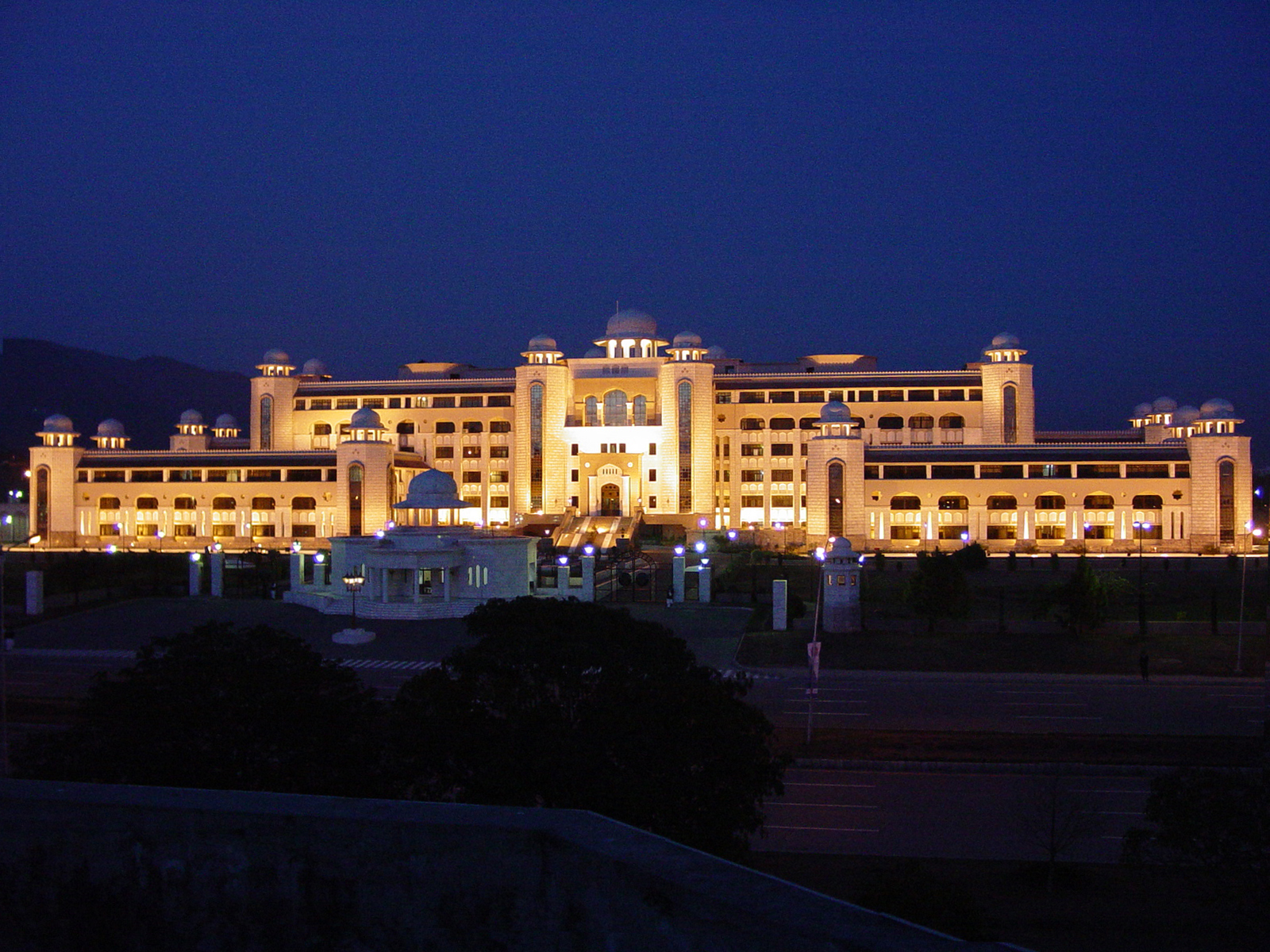
- The Prime Minister Secretariat, principal workplace of the Prime Minister
- Interactive map of Pakistan Secretariat
- Country: Pakistan
- Territory: Capital Territory
- Zone: I

Government
  - Body: Islamabad Metropolitan Corporation

The Federal Secretariat, also known as the Pakistan Secretariat (Urdu: دفترِمتعمد پاکستان), serves as the headquarters for the Cabinet and Government of Pakistan. It is located on Red Zone in Islamabad, Capital Territory, Pakistan.

== Blocks ==
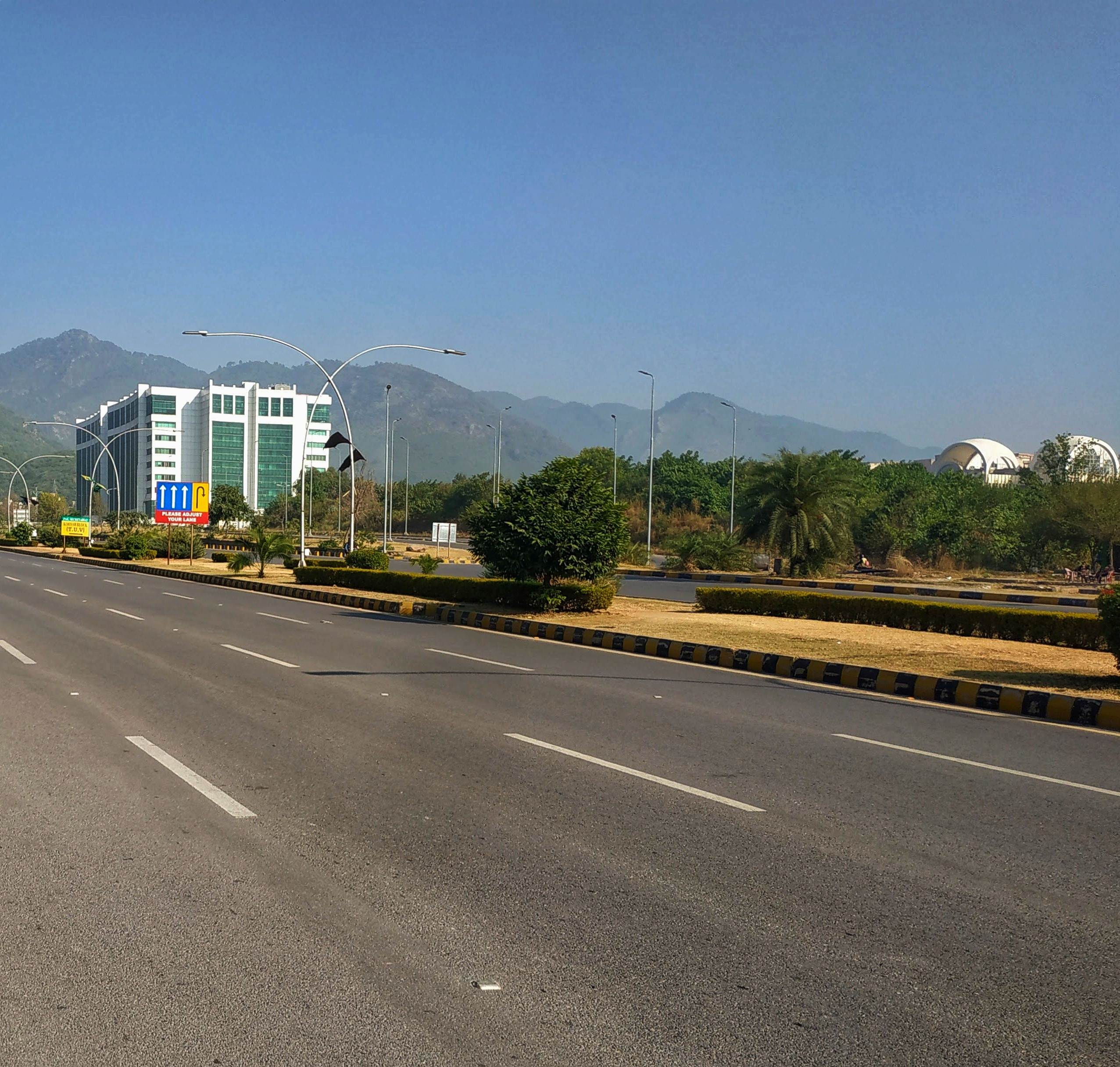
Kohsar Block, Pak Secretariat

- Block A:
  - Ministry of Commerce & Textile Industry
  - Ministry of Industries & Production
  - Ministry of Petroleum & Natural Resources
  - Ministry of Energy
- Block B:
  - Ministry of National Food Security & Research
- Block C:
  - Ministry of Federal Education and Professional Training
- Block D:
  - Ministry of Communications
  - Ministry of Railways
- Block E:
- Block F:
  - Benazir Income Support Programme(HQ)
- Block G:
- Block H:
- Block I:
- Block J:
- Block K (Kohsar Block):
  - Intelligence Bureau(HQ)
  - Ministry of Aviation
  - Ministry of Maritime Affairs
  - Ministry of National Health Services, Regulations and Coordination
  - Ministry of Human Rights
  - Ministry of Religious Affairs
  - Ministry of Overseas Pakistanis and Human Resource Development
  - Ministry of Narcotics Control
  - Council of Common Interest
  - Board of Investment
  - Pakistan Atomic Energy Commission(HQ)
- Block L:
- Block M:
- Block N:
  - National Archives of Pakistan
- Block O:
- Block P:
  - Ministry of Planning & Development
- Block Q:
  - Ministry of Finance, Revenue & Economic Affairs
- Block R:
  - Ministry of Interior
  - Ministry of Law & Justice
  - Ministry of Kashmir Affairs & Gilgit-Baltistan
  - Ministry of Parliamentary Affairs
- Block S:
  - Ministry of States & Frontier Regions
- Block T:
- Block U:
- Block V:
- Block W:
- Block X:
- Block Y:
- Block Z:
