= Imran Khan =

Prime Minister of Pakistan from 2018 to 2022

Imran Khan HI(C) PP FRCPE
- عمران خان
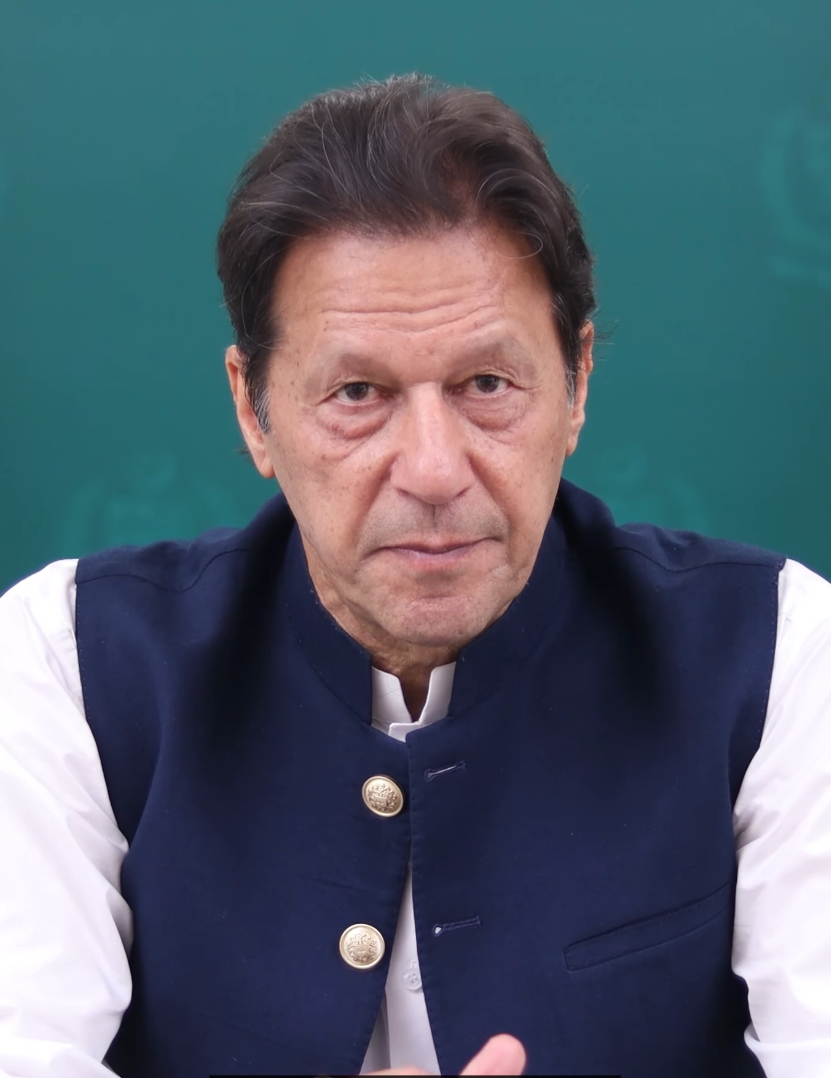
- Khan in 2021

19th Prime Minister of Pakistan
- In office 18 August 2018 – 10 April 2022
- President: Mamnoon Hussain; Arif Alvi
- Preceded by: Nasirul Mulk (caretaker)
- Succeeded by: Shehbaz Sharif

Chairman of the Pakistan Tehreek-e-Insaf
- In office 25 April 1996 – 2 December 2023
- Vice-Chairman: Shah Mahmood Qureshi
- Preceded by: Position established
- Succeeded by: Gohar Ali Khan

Member of the National Assembly
- In office 13 August 2018 – 21 October 2022
- Preceded by: Obaidullah Shadikhel
- Constituency: NA-95 Mianwali-I
- In office 19 June 2013 – 31 May 2018
- Preceded by: Hanif Abbasi
- Succeeded by: Sheikh Rashid Shafique
- Constituency: NA-56 Rawalpindi-VII
- In office 10 October 2002 – 3 November 2007
- Preceded by: Constituency established
- Succeeded by: Nawabzada Malik Amad Khan
- Constituency: NA-71 Mianwali-I

Chancellor of the University of Bradford
- In office 7 December 2005 – 8 December 2014
- Preceded by: Betty Lockwood
- Succeeded by: Kate Swann

Personal details
- Born: Imran Ahmed Khan Niazi; 5 October 1952 (age 74) Lahore, West Punjab, Pakistan
- Party: PTI (since 1996)
- Spouses: Jemima Goldsmith (m. 1995; div. 2004) Reham Khan (m. 2015; div. 2015) Bushra Bibi (m. 2018)
- Children: 2
- Relatives: Family of Imran Khan
- Education: Keble College, Oxford (B.A.)
- Awards: See list
- Nicknames: Kaptaan (Captain); Immy; Qaidi No. 804 (Prisoner No. 804)
- Cricket career

Personal information
- Height: 6 ft (183 cm)
- Batting: Right-handed
- Bowling: Right-arm fast
- Role: All-rounder

International information
- National side: Pakistan (1971–1992)
- Test debut (cap 88): 3 June 1971 v England
- Last Test: 2 January 1992 v Sri Lanka
- ODI debut (cap 175): 31 August 1974 v England
- Last ODI: 25 March 1992 v England

Career statistics
Competition	Test	ODI	FC	LA
Matches	88	175	382	425
Runs scored	3,807	3,709	17,771	10,100
Batting average	37.69	33.41	36.79	33.22
100s/50s	6/18	1/19	30/93	5/66
Top score	136	102*	170	114*
Balls bowled	19,458	7,461	65,224	19,122
Wickets	362	182	1287	507
Bowling average	22.81	26.61	22.32	22.31
5 wickets in innings	23	1	70	6
10 wickets in match	6	0	13	0
Best bowling	8/58	6/14	8/34	6/14
Catches/stumpings	28/–	36/–	117/–	84/–
Medal record
Men's Cricket
Representing Pakistan
ICC Cricket World Cup
Winner	1992 Australia and New Zealand
ACC Asia Cup
Runner-up	1986 Sri Lanka
- Source: ESPNcricinfo, 5 November 2014

Imran Ahmed Khan Niazi (Note: Urdu: عمران احمد خان نیازی, pronounced [ɪmˈɾaːn ˈɛɦməd ˈxaːn nɪˈjaːziː].) (born 5 October 1952) is a Pakistani former cricketer, philanthropist, and politician who served as the 19th prime minister of Pakistan from August 2018 until April 2022. As a cricketer, he captained the Pakistan national cricket team to victory in the 1992 Cricket World Cup. After retiring from cricket, he established the Shaukat Khanum Memorial Cancer Hospital and Research Centre, Pakistan's first cancer hospital. He is the founder of the political party Pakistan Tehreek-e-Insaf (PTI) and was its chairman from 1996 to 2023.

Born in Lahore, he graduated from Keble College, Oxford. He began his international cricket career in a 1971 Test series against England. He advocated for neutral umpiring during his captaincy. He played his last Test in January 1992 against Sri Lanka and retired after the 1992 Cricket World Cup final. In 2009, he was inducted into the ICC Cricket Hall of Fame. In his bachelorhood, Khan had several relationships. He married Jemima Goldsmith in 1995, with whom he had two sons; Reham Khan in 2015; and Bushra Bibi in 2018. His first two marriages ended in divorce.

He supported General Musharraf's 1999 Pakistani coup d'état but fell out with him around July 2002, and was first elected to the National Assembly of Pakistan in the 2002 Pakistani general election. In the 2018 Pakistani general election, he contested five constituencies and became the first person in Pakistan's electoral history to win all five; he subsequently became prime minister in a PTI-led coalition government. During his premiership, he launched Pakistan's largest welfare programme during the COVID-19 pandemic and spoke out against Islamophobia in the Western world. In February 2022, he became the first Pakistani prime minister since 2002 to visit Moscow, arriving on the day the Russian invasion of Ukraine began. In April 2022, he became the first Pakistani prime minister to be removed from office through a no-confidence motion. He alleged US involvement in his removal, blaming Washington for opposing his foreign policy that sought closer relations with China and Russia.

In October 2022, the Election Commission barred him from holding elected office for one term over the Toshakhana case. The following month, he survived an assassination attempt. In May 2023, he was arrested in the Al-Qadir Trust case, triggering the May 9 riots; although the Supreme Court later declared his arrest unlawful due to violation of judicial sanctity, he was arrested again in August. In January 2025, he was sentenced to 14 years' imprisonment in the Al-Qadir Trust case, followed in December by a further 17-year sentence and a fine in the Toshakhana-II case. He has alleged that his imprisonment is politically motivated, a claim denied by the Shehbaz Sharif government and the post-2022 military establishment. He has been held in Adiala Jail in Rawalpindi since his arrest in 2023.

== Early life and family ==
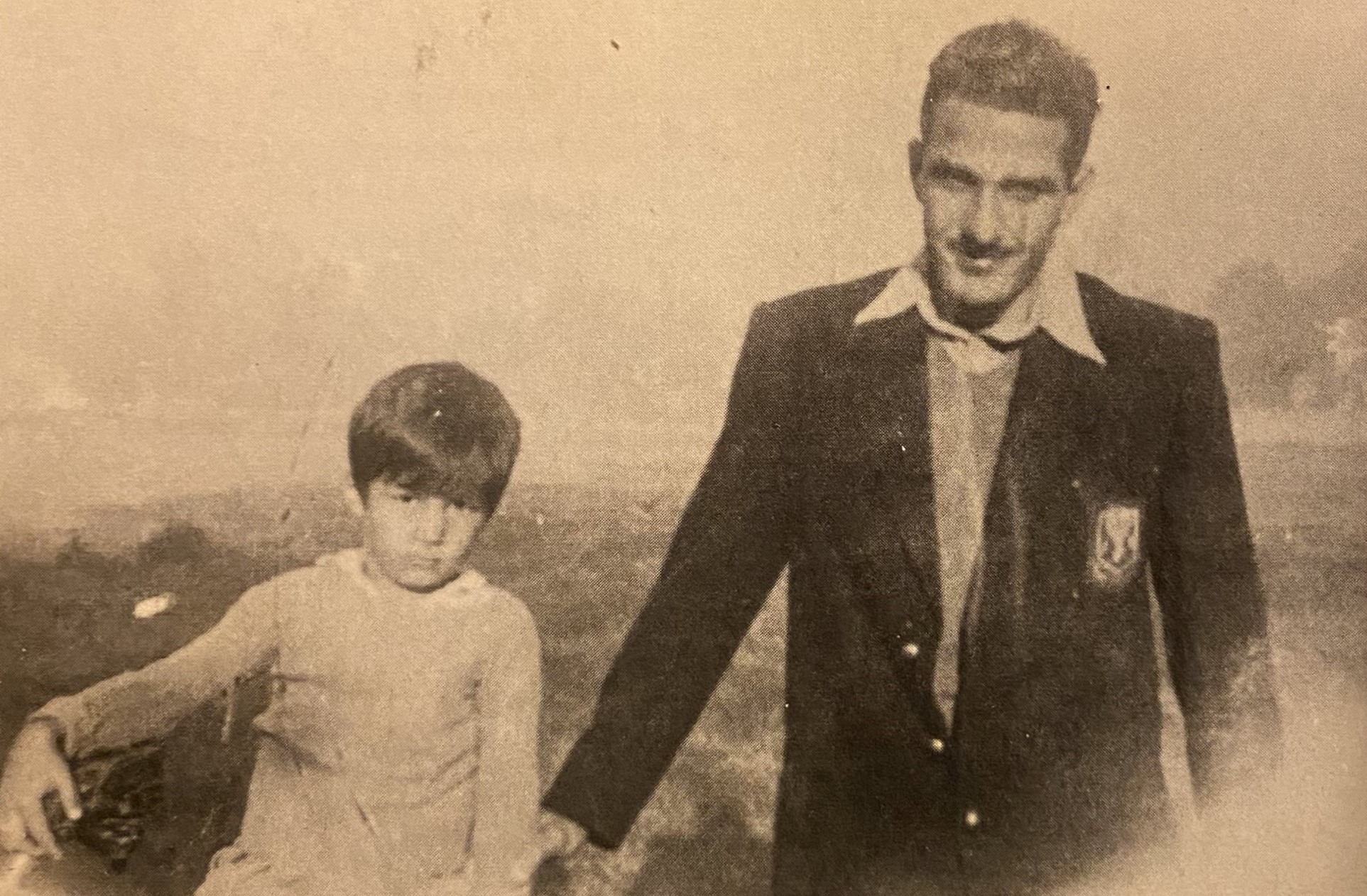
Khan with his uncle Javed Zaman, who would later become his cricket mentor, c. 1957.

Khan was born in Lahore on 5 October 1952. (Note: Some sources state he was born on 25 November 1952, but Khan has said that this mistake stemmed from the date being written erroneously on his passport.) He is the only son of Ikramullah Khan Niazi, a civil engineer, and his wife, Shaukat Khanum, and has four sisters. Paternally, he is of Pathan origin from the Niazi tribe. His maternal family is from the Burki community, having lived near Jalandhar for centuries before migrating to Pakistan after the partition of India in 1947.

He attended Cathedral School and Aitchison College in Lahore. He moved to Royal Grammar School Worcester in England in September 1971, where he performed well in cricket. In 1972, after being turned down by Cambridge University, he was admitted to Keble College, Oxford, where he studied philosophy, politics and economics, graduating in 1975. Paul Hayes, a cricket enthusiast, helped facilitate his entry to Oxford.

== Personal life ==
Khan had several relationships during his bachelorhood. His first girlfriend, Emma Sergeant, an artist and daughter of British investor Sir Patrick Sergeant, began a relationship with him in 1982. They visited Pakistan together, including during a hunting trip to Peshawar and a cricket tour to Australia. Sergeant also painted his portrait during their relationship at his request. Khan's Chelsea residence, near Sergeant's studio and Tramp, became a focus of his social life during this period. The relationship ended in 1986 after periods of separation.

Ana-Luisa White, daughter of British industrialist Gordon White and later known as Sita, began a relationship with Khan in 1986, shortly after his relationship with Sergeant ended. The relationship lasted two years. White later became pregnant after an encounter in 1991 and gave birth to a daughter, Tyrian Jade, in June 1992. She subsequently claimed that Khan was the father. In 1997, a California court ruled that Khan was Tyrian's father after White filed a paternity suit. The ruling followed his failure to respond to the suit or a request for a blood test. Khan denied paternity and said he would take a paternity test in Pakistan and accept the decision of the Pakistani courts. After White's death in 2004, Jemima, Khan's wife and a friend of White, was named Tyrian's legal guardian in White's will. Khan said Tyrian could join their family in London, leaving the decision to Jemima because of her relationship with his and Jemima's sons.

In August 1992, Khan began dating Kristiane Backer, a German MTV host. Their relationship lasted nearly three years, during which Khan introduced her to Islam.

Khan and Jemima Goldsmith confirmed their engagement on 12 May 1995. They married in a brief Islamic Nikah ceremony in Paris on 16 May, followed by a civil ceremony at the Richmond register office on 21 June before moving to Lahore. Khan said Jemima converted to Islam "through her own convictions" after studying the religion. They have two sons, Sulaiman Isa and Kasim. On 22 June 2004, the couple divorced after nine years of marriage.

On 8 January 2015, Khan married British-Pakistani journalist Reham Khan in a private Nikah ceremony at his Islamabad residence. They announced their divorce on 22 October 2015.

In 2016, media reports speculated about a possible third marriage involving Khan and his spiritual guide Bushra Bibi. Khan dismissed the reports as "absolutely baseless", while members of the Manika family also denied the rumour. Khan criticised the media for spreading the reports, and PTI filed a complaint against the channels involved.

In 2017, PTI member Ayesha Gulalai alleged that Khan, then the party chairman, had sexually harassed her. Gulalai said he had sent her "inappropriate text messages", with the first allegedly sent in October 2013. Khan said he had not sent "indecent messages" to Gulalai and supported Prime Minister Shahid Khaqan Abbasi's proposal for a special committee to investigate the allegations. He later opposed the proposed committee's composition, calling for an independent panel to assess the allegations first. Khan and his party filed a defamation suit against Gulalai. No inquiry was ultimately conducted and Gulalai did not publicly release the alleged messages.

On 7 January 2018, the PTI central secretariat said Khan had proposed marriage to Bushra, but that she had not yet accepted. On 18 February, PTI confirmed that Khan had married Bushra Bibi. The mufti who conducted the marriage later testified that the nikah had been performed twice. He said the first ceremony, on 1 January 2018, took place while Bushra was still in iddat, and alleged that he had believed the marriage would help Khan become prime minister.

== Cricket career ==
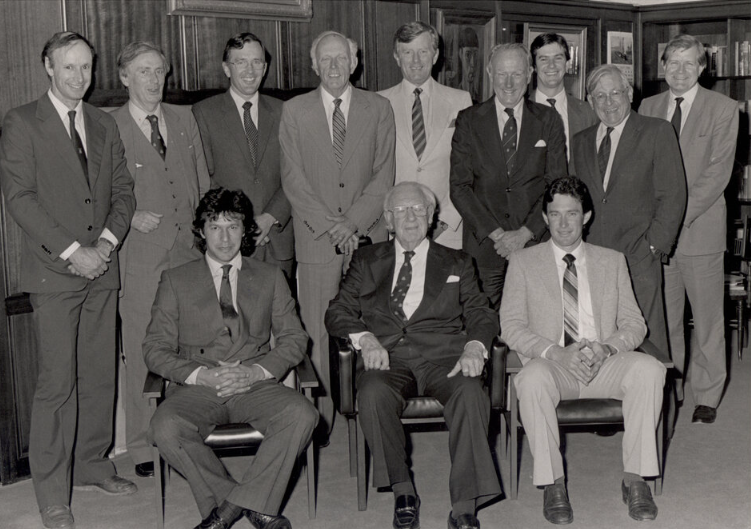
Khan as a test cricketer at a luncheon with Sydney University's Vice-Chancellor John Manning Ward before playing for the university club. Seated: Imran Khan, Chancellor Sir Hermann Black, Coach John Dyson. Ward stands second from left, 1984

Khan made his first-class debut at 16 in Lahore. In the early 1970s, he played for several Lahore-based teams, including Lahore A, Lahore B, Lahore Greens and Lahore. (Note: Lahore A and Lahore B from 1969 to 1970; Lahore Greens from 1970 to 1971.) He played for the Oxford University Cricket Club from 1973 to 1975, earning a Blue. Between 1971 and 1976, Khan played English county cricket for Worcestershire, and also represented Dawood Industries (Note: From 1975 to 1976) and Pakistan International Airlines. (Note: From 1975 to 1976; 1980 and 1981) From 1983 to 1988, he played for Sussex.

Khan made his Test cricket debut against England in June 1971 at Edgbaston. In August 1974, he played his first One Day International (ODI), against England at Trent Bridge in the Prudential Trophy.

He received the Wetherell Award for leading all-rounder in English first-class cricket in 1976 and 1980. By 1977, he was playing in Kerry Packer's World Series Cricket.

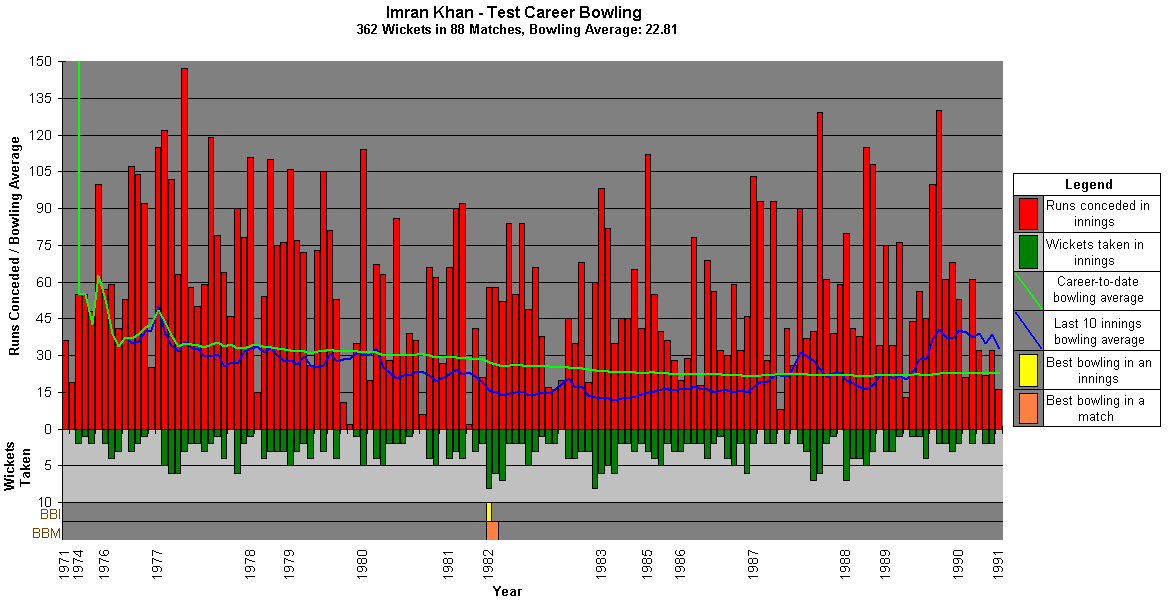
Khan's bowling statistics as a cricketer from 1971 to 1991.

As a bowler, Khan learned reverse swing from Sarfraz Nawaz and later taught it to Wasim Akram and Waqar Younis. From January 1980 to 1988, he took 236 Test wickets at an average of 17.77, including 18 five-wicket hauls and five 10-wicket hauls. His figures compared favourably with those of Richard Hadlee, Malcolm Marshall, Dennis Lillee, Joel Garner and Michael Holding in both average and strike rate. He was the leading Test wicket-taker in 1982. He recorded his best Test figures, taking 8 wickets for 58 runs against Sri Lanka in 1981–82.

=== Captaincy ===
In 1982, Khan became captain of the Pakistan national cricket team. Under his captaincy, Pakistan won their first Test in England in 28 years at Lord's in 1982. In 1983, he was named a Wisden Cricketer of the Year. During Pakistan's 1982–83 series against India, he took 40 wickets at an average of 13.95. In January 1983, he became the second cricketer, after Ian Botham, to score a century and take 10 wickets in a Test. The following month, he reached a Test bowling rating of 922, (Note: The International Cricket Council player ratings did not exist at the time; they were calculated retrospectively.) the highest International Cricket Council (ICC) rating since World War I, and third-highest in all-time ICC Test bowling. He became the first Pakistani bowler to take 200 Test wickets. The series caused a stress fracture in his left shin, sidelining him for more than two years. Initially, he was able to bat but not bowl, before the injury eventually prevented him from playing altogether. An experimental treatment in London, funded by the Pakistani government, helped him recover by late 1984. He returned under Javed Miandad's captaincy in the 1984–85 home series against Sri Lanka. Miandad subsequently stepped down as captain, citing limited co-operation from Khan, who was then reappointed captain.

Khan initiated reforms in cricket umpiring to reduce criticism of Pakistani officials in home series. In 1986, he invited Indian umpires VK Ramaswamy and Piloo Reporter to officiate a Test against West Indies. He subsequently brought England's John Hampshire and John Holder to officiate in the home series against India in 1989–90. The initiatives contributed to the introduction of a rule in 1994 requiring one neutral umpire and a 2002 rule requiring both umpires to be independent.

In 1987, Khan led Pakistan to its first Test series win in India, followed by its first series victory in England the same year. He retired from international cricket after the 1987 Cricket World Cup, but returned at the request of General Zia-ul-Haq and resumed the captaincy. In 1988, he led Pakistan on a successful West Indies tour, where he was named Man of the Series after taking 23 wickets in three Tests. He became the first Asian and eighth non-Australian to win the International Cricketer of the Year in 1989.

As captain, he led Pakistan in 48 Tests (14 wins, 8 losses, 26 draws) and 139 ODIs (75 wins, 59 losses, 1 tie). In Tests, he holds the record for most wickets as captain, second-best innings figures (8/60), most five-wicket hauls in an innings (12), and most ten-wicket match hauls (4).

==== 1992 Cricket World Cup final ====
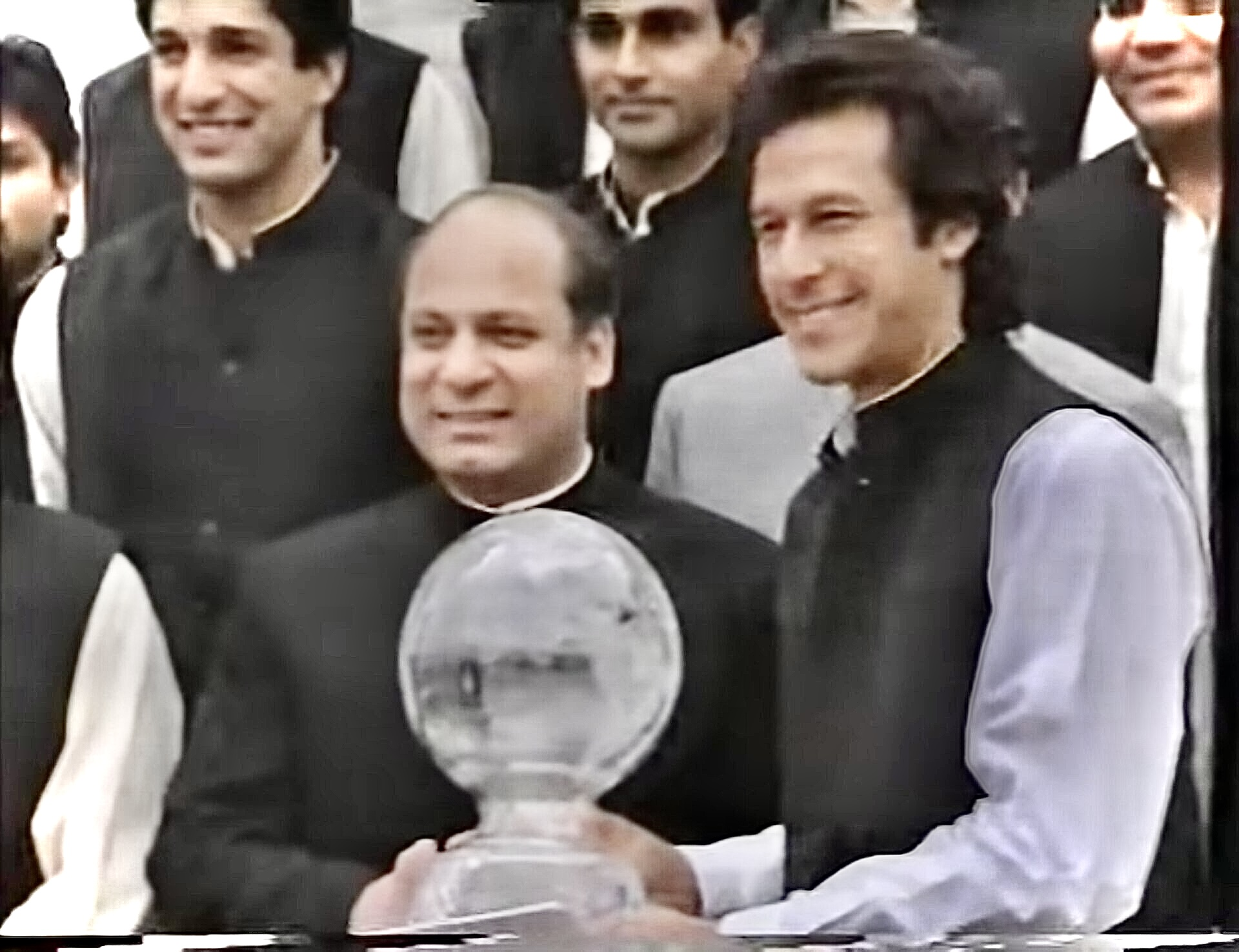
Khan presenting the World Cup to the then Prime Minister of Pakistan, Nawaz Sharif, during a dinner held in the team's honour after their win in the 1992 World Cup.

Khan led Pakistan to victory in the 1992 Cricket World Cup. In the final, he top-scored with 72 runs and took the match-winning final wicket himself. This was Pakistan's first World Cup victory.

It was rock-bottom when we lost to South Africa. I told the boys they had to play as if they were cornered tigers. I told them to forget about bowling no-balls and wides, and just go out there and fight.

=== Retirement ===
He played his last Test in January 1992 against Sri Lanka and retired from international cricket after leading Pakistan to victory in the 1992 Cricket World Cup final.

=== Career stats ===
He ended his career with 88 Tests, 126 innings, scoring 3,807 runs at an average of 37.69, including six centuries, 18 fifties, and a highest score of 136. He had the second-highest all-time Test batting average of 61.86 playing at number six in the batting order. As a bowler, he took 362 Test wickets. He has won the most Player of the Series awards for Pakistan in Test cricket, ranking fourth overall in Test history. In ODIs, he played 175 matches, scoring 3,709 runs at an average of 33.41, with a highest score of 102 not out. His best ODI bowling was 6 for 14, the highest ODI innings figures recorded by any bowler in a defeat. He achieved the all-rounder's triple—3,000 runs and 300 wickets—in 75 Tests, becoming one of the first four players to reach the mark. As of 2025, he is one of eleven players to have done so, and his 75-Test achievement is the third-fastest ever.

== Post-retirement from cricket ==
After retiring, Khan said he had engaged in ball tampering during county cricket, saying he "occasionally scratched the side of the ball and lifted the seam," and defended it by saying it was a commonplace practice. He announced his return as a domestic league coach in May 2003.

He occasionally appeared as a cricket commentator on Star TV. In 2004, during the Indian cricket team's tour of Pakistan, he appeared as a commentator on TEN Sports' live show, Straight Drive.

On 23 November 2005, Khan was appointed chancellor of the University of Bradford. In 2009, he was inducted into the ICC Cricket Hall of Fame. On 26 February 2014, the University of Bradford Union moved a no-confidence motion to remove him for missing all graduation ceremonies since 2010. On 30 November 2014, he stepped down, citing "increasing political commitments," although it was reported that he effectively resigned under pressure.

=== Philanthropy ===
Khan served as UNICEF Special Representative for Sports, promoting health and immunisation programmes in countries like Bangladesh, Pakistan, Sri Lanka, and Thailand. In 1994, he founded Pakistan's first cancer hospital, the Shaukat Khanum Memorial Cancer Hospital and Research Centre, named after his mother, who had died of cancer. He raised funds by touring the country, with most donations coming from common people. He aimed to provide free treatment to underprivileged patients, and as of 2024, 70% of patients receive free care.

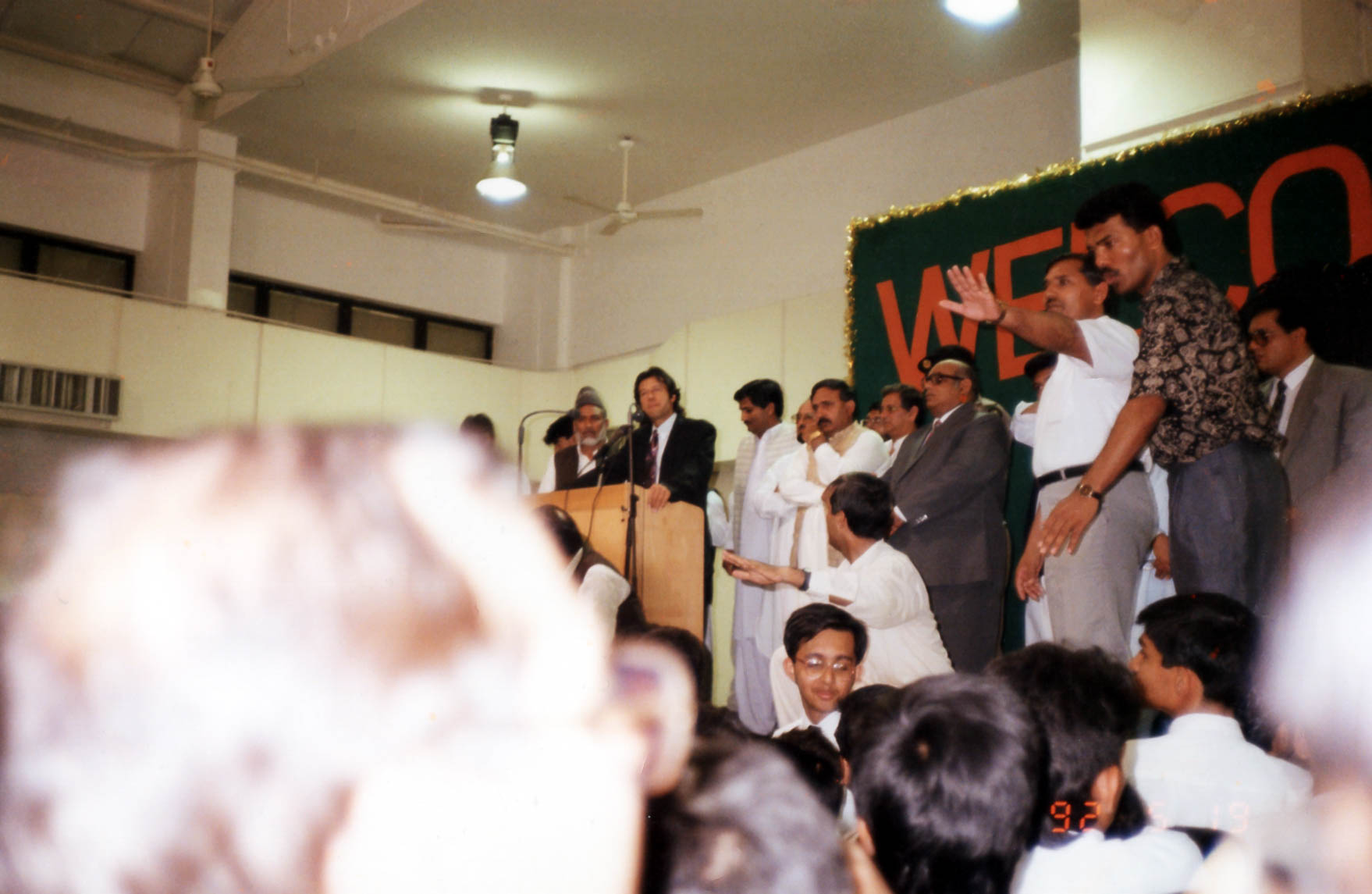
Khan fundraising for Shaukat Khanum Memorial Cancer Hospital and Research Centre in Jeddah, 1992

To aid victims of the 2001 Islamabad cloud burst, Khan auctioned his signed 1992 Cricket World Cup bat and match sweater; the bat alone fetched US$20,000. He said these were the last items he had, having earlier auctioned the rest for Shaukat Khanum Hospital.

In December 2005, Khan, then Chancellor of the University of Bradford, signed a memorandum of understanding to establish Namal College in Mianwali as its associate college. Built by the Mianwali Development Trust on land donated by locals, it aimed to tackle unemployment through technical and vocational education. The college opened in 2008.

In 2006, while visiting his children in London, he also worked with the Lord's Taverners cricket charity.

Khan established The Imran Khan Foundation (IKF) in February 2006. In January 2013, IKF launched a Rs30 million relief project for internally displaced persons of the Mehsud tribe from North Waziristan, providing food, winter essentials, and tents to 2,600 families in Tank, Khyber Pakhtunkhwa, who had limited government assistance.

== Political career prior to premiership ==
=== Initial years ===
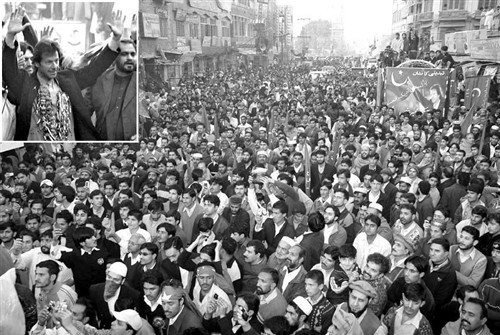
Khan at a political rally in Peshawar in 1996

In 1987, President Zia-ul-Haq offered Khan a post in the Pakistan Muslim League (PML), which he declined. In 1993, he was appointed tourism ambassador in the caretaker government of Moeenuddin Ahmad Qureshi, serving for three months until the government was dissolved. He entered politics in the mid-1990s in open alliance with former Inter-Services Intelligence (ISI) chief Hamid Gul. Khan joined Gul and Muhammad Ali Durrani in planning to launch a "pressure group" to act as a civil society watchdog, but the group never materialised.

In 1995, Prime Minister Benazir Bhutto, fearing a military coup that could make him prime minister, responded with punitive measures. State television refused to air archival cricket footage and banned fundraising advertisements for Shaukat Khanum Memorial Cancer Hospital during Ramadan. Authorities also spread rumours that he was under investigation for embezzlement and tax irregularities. Donations to the hospital halved that year as a result.

On 25 April 1996, he founded Pakistan Tehreek-e-Insaf (PTI). Nawaz Sharif invited him to join his party, offering him the second-in-command position and 30 National Assembly seats; Khan declined. In the 1997 election, he contested the National Assembly constituencies of NA-53 Mianwali and NA-94 Lahore as a PTI candidate but lost both to candidates of the Pakistan Muslim League (N) (PML (N)).

Khan initially supported General Musharraf's 1999 Pakistani coup d'état, believing Musharraf would end corruption and the influence of political elites. His PTI was among the parties that supported Pervez Musharraf in the 2002 Pakistani referendum. However, Khan's relationship with the regime deteriorated. In July 2002, Musharraf's principal secretary Tariq Aziz tried to persuade him to join a pro-military alliance, but the meeting ended in acrimony, with Aziz telling Khan that he would never win his seat. Khan contested the 2002 Pakistani general election, saying that PTI would consider forming a coalition if it did not win a majority, and was the party's only successful candidate.

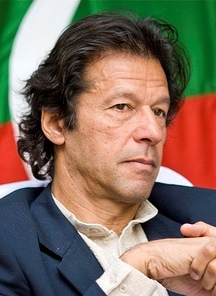
Khan in 2007

In May 2005, Hendrik Hertzberg described him as "most directly responsible" for drawing attention in the Muslim world to the alleged desecration of the Qur'an at Guantanamo Bay Naval Base. In August 2005, Declan Walsh called him a "miserable politician", saying "Khan's ideas and affiliations since entering politics in 1996 have swerved and skidded like a rickshaw in a rainshower... He preaches democracy one day but gives a vote to reactionary mullahs the next." In March 2006, Khan was escorted home by police and placed under house arrest after threatening to protest against President George W. Bush during his visit to Pakistan.

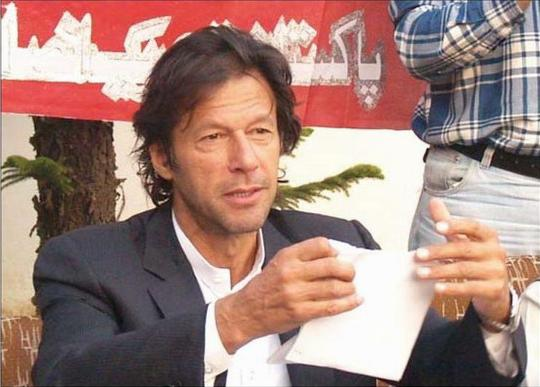
Khan tearing his nomination paper for the National Assembly at a press conference; he boycotted the 2008 elections.

On 2 October 2007, as part of the All Parties Democratic Movement, he joined 85 MPs in resigning from Parliament to protest the 2007 Pakistani presidential election, which General Musharraf contested without resigning as army chief. After Musharraf declared a state of emergency on 3 November 2007, Khan was placed under house arrest but later escaped. He emerged from hiding on 14 November to join a student protest at the University of the Punjab. Activists from the Islami Jamiat-e-Talaba, the student wing of Jamaat-e-Islami, restrained him inside a building during the rally. He was arrested during the protest and sent to the Central Jail, Dera Ghazi Khan, where he spent a week before being released.

He opposed the 2010 military operation in Kala Dhaka. On 30 October 2011, he addressed over 100,000 supporters at the Minar-e-Pakistan in Lahore, challenging government policies, and calling his movement "not a flood that is coming, but a tsunami." Another gathering of at least 100,000 supporters occurred in Karachi on 25 December 2011.

In August 2012, the Pakistani Taliban issued death threats to him over his march to their tribal stronghold to protest U.S. drone strikes in Pakistan, calling him a "liberal" and "secular" — terms they equated with being an infidel. On 1 October, they withdrew death threats and offered him protection for the rally. They "endorse[d] Imran Khan's plea that drone strikes are against our sovereignty." On 6 October, he led a convoy of 10,000 to protest US drone strikes. Security personnel stopped the convoy just miles from South Waziristan's border after negotiations failed, and Khan announced that the rally would return to Tank.

=== 2013 elections ===
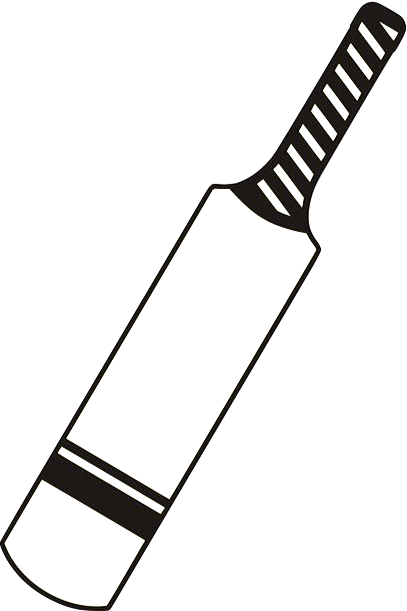
Khan chose the cricket bat as the electoral symbol for his party in the 2013 elections, and it remained as such until 2023

On 21 April 2013, Khan launched his election campaign from Lahore, addressing thousands at The Mall. He campaigned on withdrawing Pakistan from the US-led war on terror, pursuing peace in the Pashtun tribal belt, and introducing a uniform education system aimed at providing equal opportunities for children. He concluded the campaign in South Punjab's Seraiki belt with rallies in several cities.

On 7 May, four days before the election, Khan fell from a lifter while boarding a stage at a rally, sustaining head injuries, and four fractured vertebrae. He concluded the campaign by addressing a rally in Islamabad via video link from his hospital bed.

The 2013 Pakistani general election was held on 11 May. The PML (N), headed by Nawaz Sharif, won, while Khan alleged vote-rigging. The following day, Asad Umar, a leader from his party, announced that Khan had conceded defeat to PML (N). While his party welcomed the vote, he pledged to release a white paper on alleged rigging and announced plans for protests.

PTI became the leading party in the Provincial Assembly of Khyber Pakhtunkhwa, and Khan nominated Pervez Khattak to lead its first provincial government.

=== In opposition ===
Following the 2013 elections, Khan became PTI's parliamentary leader in the National Assembly. On 31 July 2013, he received a contempt-of-court notice for allegedly describing the superior judiciary as "shameful." The notice was discharged after he told the Supreme Court that his criticism had targeted lower-court judicial officers serving as returning officers during the elections.

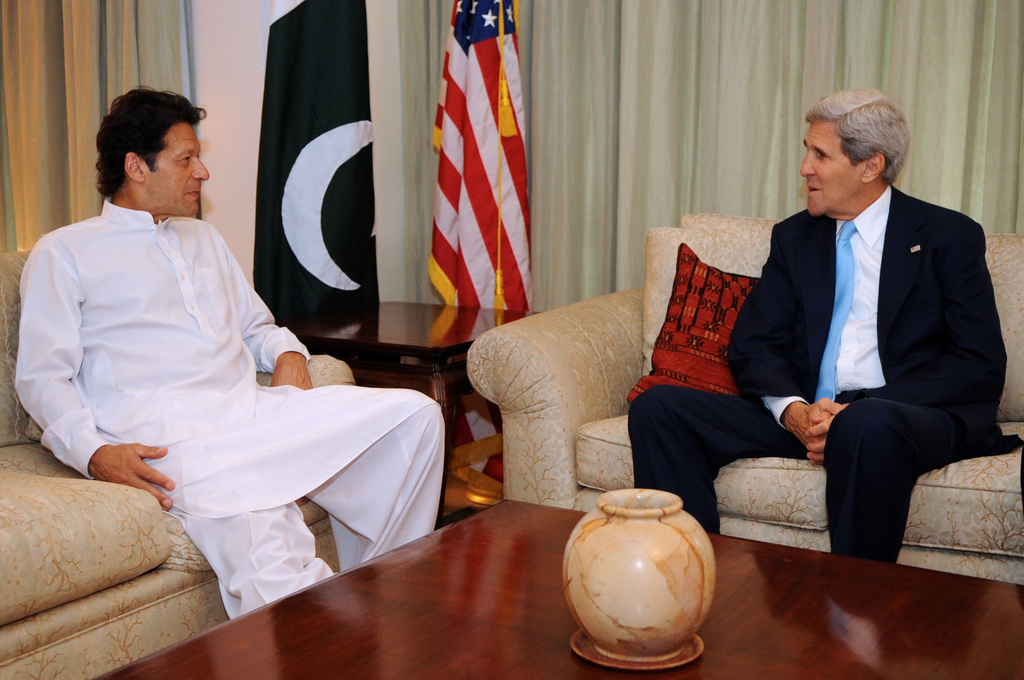
Khan meets U.S. Secretary of State John Kerry in August 2013 while he was in opposition

Khan was criticised for supporting Sami-ul-Haq, described as the "Father of the Taliban," and for funding his seminary, Darul Uloom Haqqania. He also accused the US of undermining peace with the Pakistani Taliban by killing its leader Hakimullah Mehsud in a 2013 drone strike. Khan announced plans to protest and block NATO supply lines to Afghanistan if drone attacks continued.

In May 2014, Khan demanded the resignation of all Election Commission of Pakistan (ECP) members and the formation of a new ECP, along with punishment for those he accused of stealing the electoral mandate. In August, he led a rally from Lahore to Islamabad, demanding Prime Minister Nawaz Sharif's resignation and an investigation into alleged electoral fraud. He and Canadian-Pakistani cleric Muhammad Tahir-ul-Qadri formed a "de facto" alliance to mobilise supporters for a regime-change campaign against Sharif.

Voice of America reports on Khan-led protest, August 2014

The 2014 protests also generated allegations of military involvement. Then-PTI president Javed Hashmi alleged that Khan had been instructed by the army to coordinate the protests with Pakistan Awami Tehreek (PAT), and later accused him of conspiring with elements within the army. The New York Times described Hashmi's reference to a "signal" from outside as an apparent reference to military intervention. In the Routledge Handbook of Contemporary Pakistan, Aparna Pande writes that parts of the army backed the protests, that Khan was advised by then ISI chief Zaheer-ul-Islam, and that the ISI drafted Qadri to lead them.

On 1 September, protesters led by Qadri and Khan attempted to storm Prime Minister Nawaz Sharif's official residence, triggering violence that left three people dead and more than 595 injured, including 115 police officers. PTI and PAT protesters also stormed state-run PTV, assaulting staff. Later that month, Khan urged supporters to burn electricity bills and join civil disobedience. Following the 2014 Peshawar school massacre, he ended the 126-day sit-in on 17 December, citing the need for national unity.

In March 2015, PTI and the Sharif administration agreed to establish a judicial commission to investigate allegations of electoral fraud, with the move facilitated by Army Chief General Raheel Sharif. In July, the commission found the elections broadly fair and found no systemic rigging. Khan accepted its findings but said he had not received a copy of the report.

Khan subsequently campaigned against Sharif following the Panama Papers leak in 2016, leading protests and calling for his resignation over corruption allegations.

=== 2018 elections campaign ===
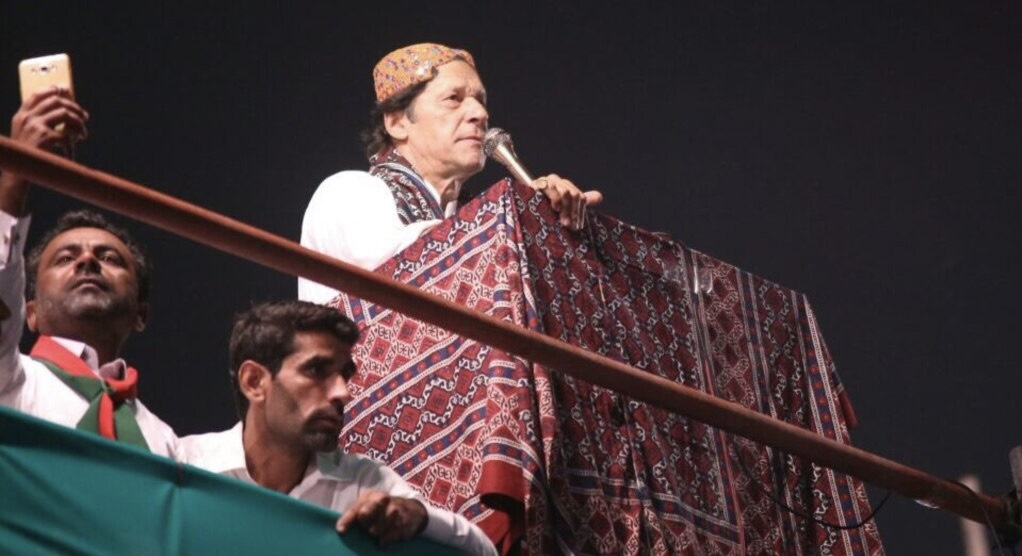
Khan campaigns for the elections in Sindh while wearing a traditional Sindhi cap and Ajrak in 2017

In the 2018 Pakistani general election, Khan contested five National Assembly constituencies. He won all five seats, becoming the first politician in Pakistan to contest and win five constituencies in a single general election.

Opposition parties alleged "massive rigging" and military influence in his favour. Nawaz Sharif and PML (N) alleged that military alignment with the judiciary had affected the outcome in Khan's favour. The Election Commission rejected the allegations. Two days after the election, Michael Gahler, chief observer of the European Union Election Observation Mission to Pakistan, said the overall situation was satisfactory.

==== Nominations and appointments ====
On 6 August 2018, PTI nominated Khan for prime minister. He designated Asad Umar as finance minister for his prospective government and nominated Mahmood Khan for Chief Minister of Khyber Pakhtunkhwa and Usman Buzdar for Chief Minister of Punjab. In Balochistan, he directed PTI to support the Balochistan Awami Party, which nominated Jam Kamal Khan as chief minister and Abdul Quddus Bizenjo as speaker.

== Prime Minister (2018–2022) ==
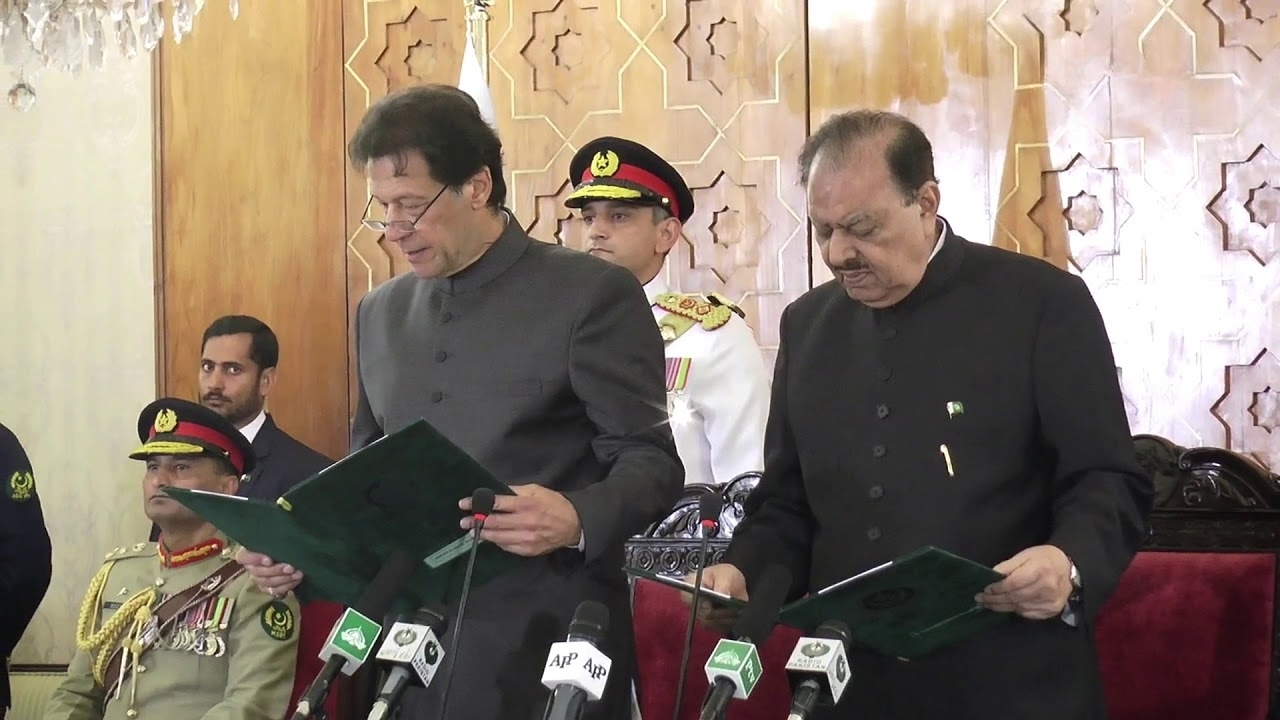
Khan (left) is sworn in as Prime Minister, with President Mamnoon Hussain administering the oath of office in 2018.

Khan was sworn in as Prime Minister of Pakistan on 18 August 2018 after his party, Pakistan Tehreek-e-Insaf (PTI), won the 2018 election.

=== Domestic initiatives ===
Khan emphasised austerity and reductions in government expenditure. His government reduced the number of staff at the prime minister's residence from 524 to two and auctioned eight buffaloes and 61 luxury vehicles previously acquired for the Prime Minister's Office. He was nevertheless criticised for using a helicopter to commute.

Khan launched the Plant for Pakistan programme, and announced the establishment of 15 national parks under the Protected Areas Initiative. During the Climate Ambition Summit in 2020 he said that Pakistan would scrap two coal projects (2,600 MW) and set a target of 60% renewable energy by 2030. He attended the signing ceremony for the $2.5 billion Kohala Hydropower Project (1,124 MW).

He appointed Lt. General Asim Munir as Director-General of Inter-Services Intelligence (DG-ISI), The Daily Telegraph reported that Munir proposed an investigation into corruption allegations involving Khan's wife, Bushra Bibi. According to The Daily Telegraph, shortly afterward, Munir was removed as Director-General of Inter-Services Intelligence (ISI). Khan said Munir's proposed investigation was not the reason for his removal.

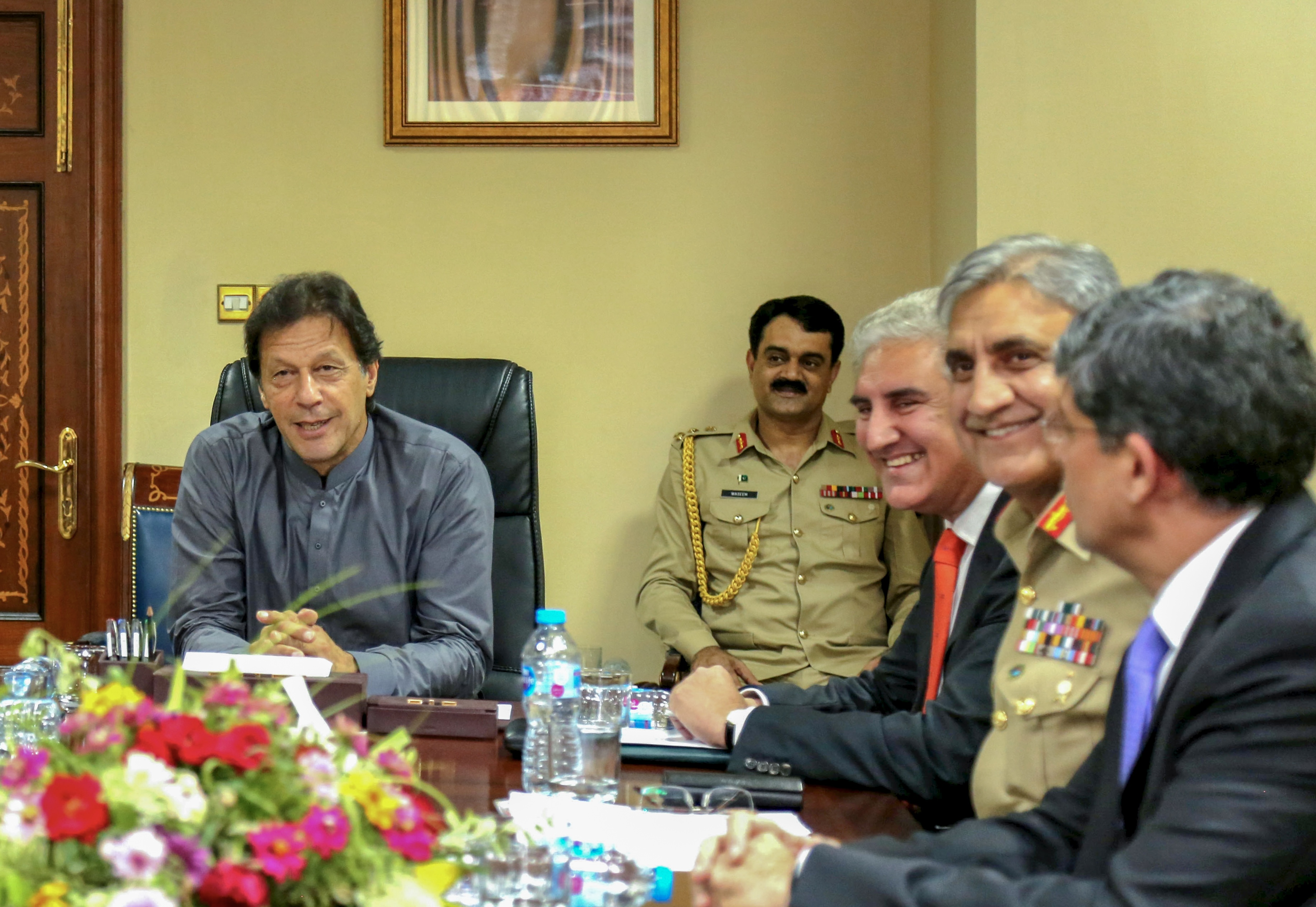
Imran Khan, accompanied by foreign minister Shah Mehmood Qureshi and Chief of Army Staff Qamar Javed Bajwa

Khan also appointed Zaheer Ahmad Babar as Chief of Air Staff. In 2019, Khan extended the tenure of General Qamar Javed Bajwa as Chief of Army Staff. At the time, he described Bajwa as a balanced personality who was fully committed to democracy, calling him the "best army chief". In November 2022, Khan said he had offered Bajwa a second extension in March that year amid a no-confidence move against his government. According to ISI chief Lt Gen Nadeem Anjum, Bajwa rejected that offer. In December 2022, Khan said he had committed a "big mistake" by extending Bajwa's tenure in 2019.

During the 2020 sugar price surge, Khan ordered an inquiry that implicated figures from both government and opposition parties and documented wrongdoing in the sugar industry. In December 2020, Khan sought the extradition of former prime minister Nawaz Sharif from London to face trial in the Panama Papers case. The 2022 Cabinet Division yearbook stated that the Assets Recovery Unit established by Khan helped government agencies recover Rs426.4 billion, although the unit itself did not directly recover assets.

During COVID-19 in Pakistan, he ruled out a complete lockdown, citing extreme poverty. Khan adopted a smart lockdown strategy, which used military technology for tracking and tracing COVID-19 cases, targeting specific virus hotspots instead of implementing a nationwide lockdown. He said that strict lockdowns would devastate Pakistan's economy and lead to starvation.

Khan elevated the status of the construction sector to that of an industry and provided incentives such as tax breaks, sales tax reduction in coordination with provinces, and a subsidy of Rs30 billion to the Naya Pakistan Housing & Development Authority. He said that investors in the industry would not be asked about their source of income for the year and removed withholding tax for all construction sectors except cement and steel. Additionally, capital gains tax was withdrawn for homeowners selling houses. Khan launched Pakistan's largest welfare programme, distributing a lump sum of Rs12,000 to 10 million low-income citizens under the Ehsaas Programme. Educationist Michael Barber said the Ehsaas Programme was Khan's flagship initiative and praised it for its transparency, multi-sectoral approach, and initiatives including Ehsaas Kafaalat and Nashonuma.

Khan called for debt relief for developing nations during the pandemic, a proposal that gained support from the United Nations and several African countries.

Prime Minister Khan calls for global debt relief amidst the COVID-19 pandemic, April 2020

Pakistan faced a worsening economic crisis towards the end of his term. After his ouster, economist Atif Mian said that Khan had inherited a weak economy but left it in a worse condition, with no increase in average income and Pakistan remaining in a balance of payments crisis.

Khan initially held the Ministry of Interior portfolio under himself after forming his cabinet. In 2019, the Interior Ministry investigated social media users, including journalists, who posted images of murdered Saudi journalist Jamal Khashoggi during Saudi Crown Prince Mohammed bin Salman's visit to Pakistan. In 2021, the International Press Institute raised "grave concerns" in an open letter to Khan over the proposed Pakistan Media Development Authority ordinance. A Pakistan Press Foundation report also criticised Khan's language towards journalists, saying that he referred to them as "mafias" and "blackmailers".

In June 2021, Khan said that the rise in rape cases in Pakistan was linked to women wearing "very few clothes," claiming that such behaviour would "have an impact on the men unless they are robots." This comment was criticised by women's rights groups, accusing him of being a "rape apologist." Khan later said the rapist is always solely responsible, the victim never is, and his earlier comments were taken out of context.

=== Foreign policy ===
President Donald Trump tweeted in November 2018 that he would cut billions in aid to Pakistan, saying it had not done "a damn thing for us." Khan responded that U.S. aid was a "minuscule" $20 billion, while Pakistan had lost 75,000 lives and over $123 billion fighting the "US war on terror." Khan also said that Pakistan had provided supply routes to U.S. forces, asking, "Can Mr Trump name another ally that gave such sacrifices?" He later told the US that Pakistan would no longer act as its "hired gun."

After the 2019 Pulwama attack in Indian-administered Kashmir, India blamed Pakistan. Khan said Pakistan was not involved in the attack and authorised the military to respond with force to any Indian aggression. After India's 2019 Balakot airstrike, Pakistan carried out Operation Swift Retort, during which Indian pilot Abhinandan Varthaman was captured. A few days later, Khan released him as a gesture of de-escalation. Following the Revocation of the special status of Jammu and Kashmir, Khan suspended high-level engagement with India. Khan inaugurated the Kartarpur Corridor, providing visa-free access to Indian Sikh pilgrims.

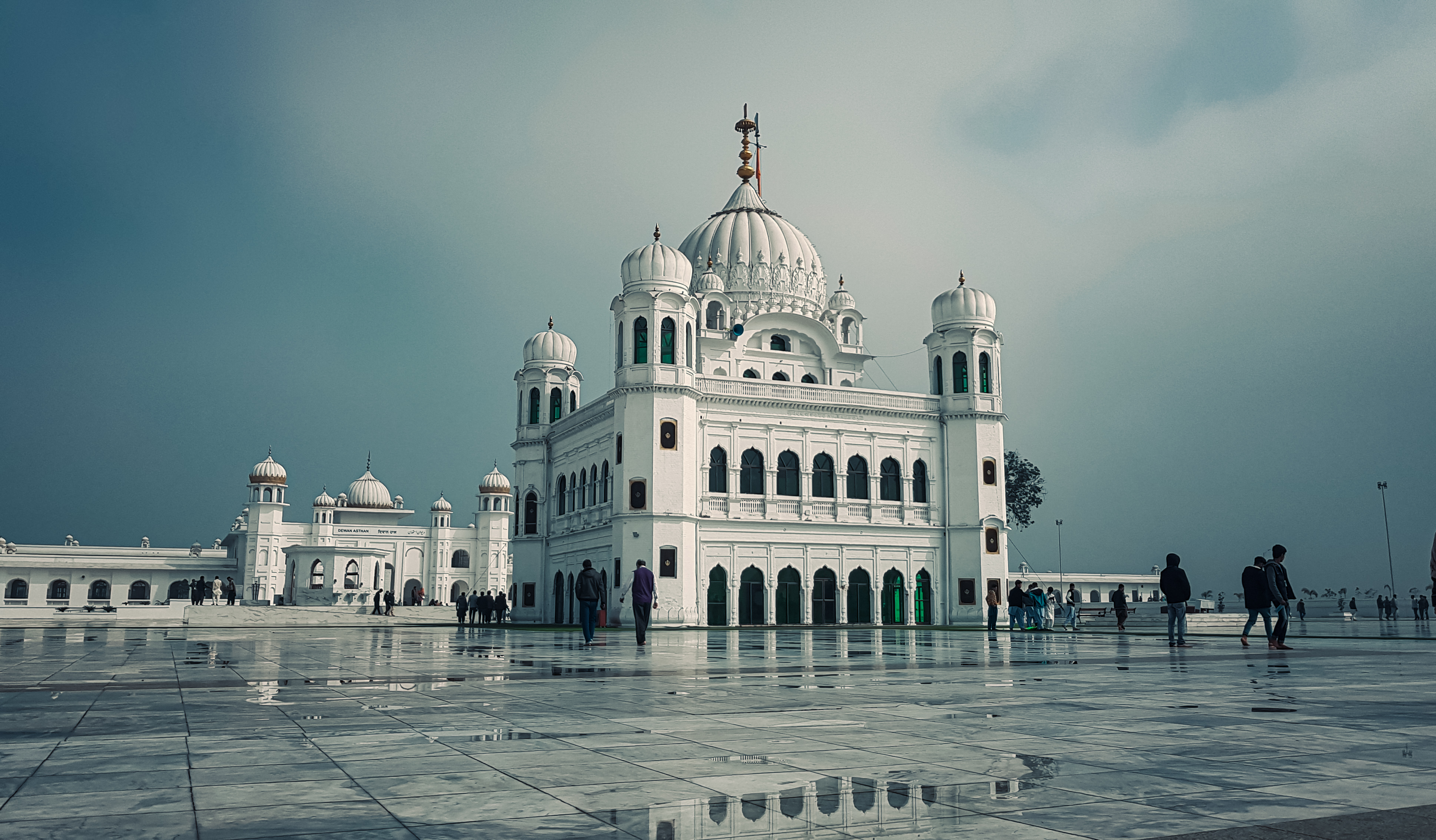
Gurdwara Darbar Sahib renovated by Khan's government

Khan supported Turkey during the 2019 Turkish offensive into north-eastern Syria. He supported the Afghan peace process and facilitated trade by inaugurating a 24/7 border crossing with Afghanistan. In 2019, he was named in the Time 100 list of most influential people. In June 2020, addressing the National Assembly of Pakistan, he called Osama bin Laden a shaheed (martyr), drawing opposition criticism.

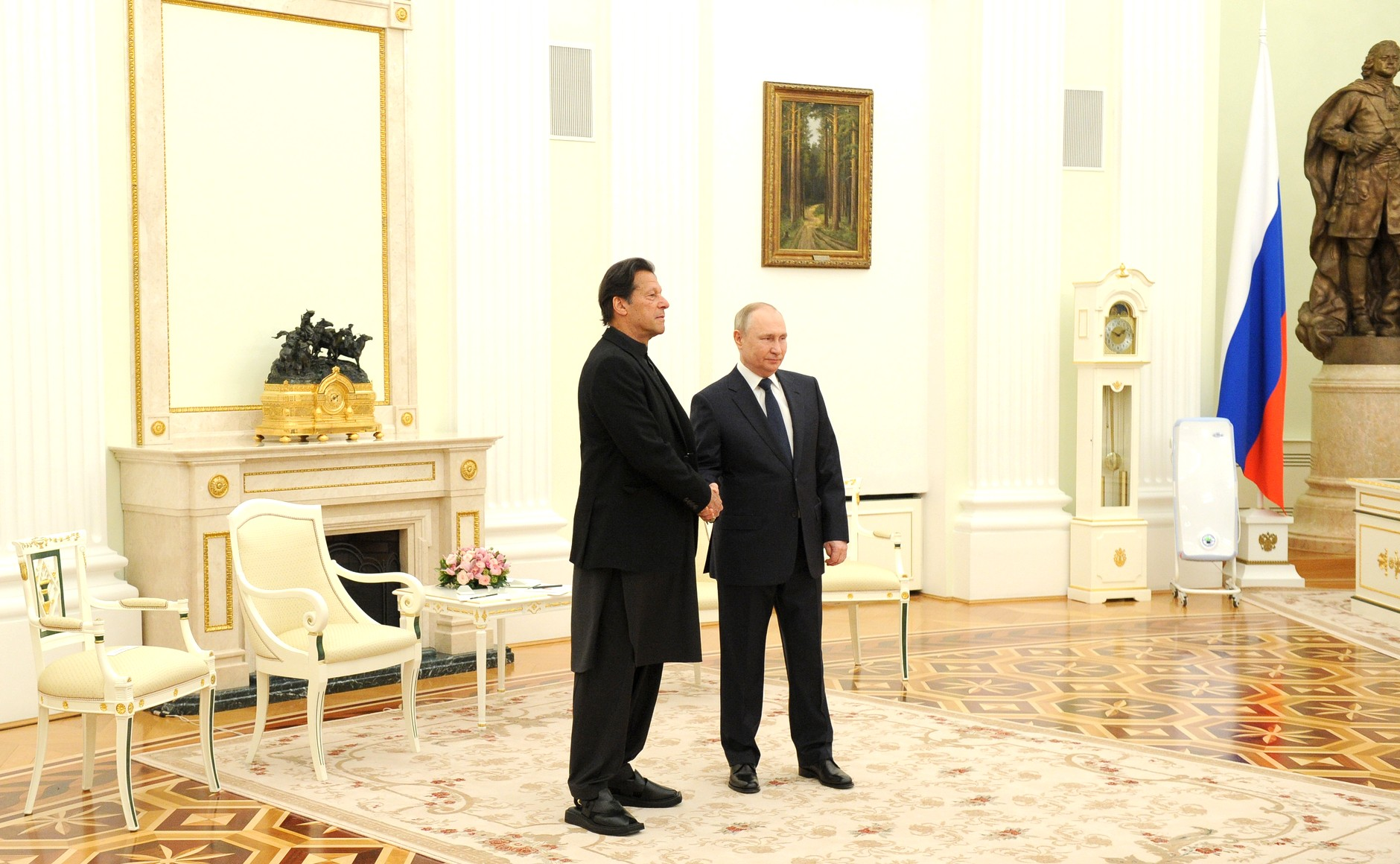
Khan met with Russian President Vladimir Putin in Moscow just hours after Russia's invasion of Ukraine began.

On 24 February 2022, Khan visited Moscow to discuss economic and energy cooperation with Russian president Vladimir Putin, becoming the first Pakistani prime minister in two decades to visit Russia. His visit took place amid heightened tensions over the prospect of a Russian invasion of Ukraine, which had seemed imminent before his arrival. In a video recorded on his arrival, he was heard saying, "What a time I have come...so much excitement." A few hours after his arrival, Russia began its full scale invasion of Ukraine. The visit drew criticism from the United States.

==== FATF compliance ====
In June 2022, two months after his ouster, FATF removed Pakistan from the grey list, citing completion of the 2018 and 2021 action plans. Khan attributed the progress to his government, particularly former energy minister Hammad Azhar, while the succeeding First Shehbaz Sharif government also claimed credit. The Express Tribune reported that Khan's government had "done most of the work."

==== Stance regarding Islamophobia ====
While addressing the Seventy-fifth session of the United Nations General Assembly in 2020, Prime Minister Khan suggested an international day to combat Islamophobia.

Khan advocated international action against Islamophobia. In 2019, he joined Turkish president Recep Tayyip Erdoğan and Malaysian prime minister Mahathir Mohamad in announcing plans for an English-language television channel addressing Islamophobia. In October 2020, Khan objected to the spread of Islamophobia, urging Facebook to ban related content and accusing French president Emmanuel Macron of attacking Islam for supporting cartoons of Prophet Muhammad. In 2021, Khan called on Muslim countries to press the West to criminalise insults against Prophet Muhammad, likening it to laws against Holocaust denial. In March 2022, Pakistan led a UN resolution designating 15 March as the International Day to Combat Islamophobia.

=== Removal from office ===
Opposition parties began planning a no-confidence motion against Khan by the end of 2021, with Fazal-ur-Rehman making a formal announcement on 11 February 2022. On 8 March, opposition parties filed a no-confidence motion, alleging economic mismanagement, including rising inflation, high debt, and a weakening currency, as well as foreign-policy failures. By 18 March, defections from his party and the departure of coalition partners had left his government without a majority in the National Assembly.

The crisis was accompanied by controversy over a diplomatic cypher that Khan said showed foreign pressure for his removal. On 27 March, he displayed the cypher at a rally and alleged US involvement in the attempt to remove him. The National Security Council subsequently expressed concern about foreign interference.

On 3 April, President Arif Alvi, acting on Khan's advice, dissolved the National Assembly after the Deputy Speaker rejected the no-confidence motion. The opposition challenged the decision in the Supreme Court of Pakistan, which ruled the rejection unconstitutional and ordered the vote to proceed. On 10 April, he sent the cypher to the Supreme Court, despite legal warnings about potential breaches of constitutional oaths and the Official Secrets Act. Later same day, the National Assembly voted to remove Khan, making him the first Pakistani prime minister to be removed through a no-confidence vote.

In August 2023, The Intercept published the alleged cypher. According to the purported document, U.S. State Department officials, including Donald Lu, raised concerns about Khan's stance on the Russian invasion of Ukraine on 8 March 2022. It reportedly said that Lu told Pakistan's ambassador that "all will be forgiven in Washington" if Khan was removed through a no-confidence motion, while indicating possible economic and political isolation if he remained. The U.S. denied trying to remove him, saying its concerns were about policy, not leadership.

== Post-premiership ==
After his removal, Khan again alleged US involvement, stating that the US opposed his foreign policy that strengthened ties with China and Russia. In November 2022, when asked about the alleged conspiracy to remove him, he said it was "behind me" and said he wanted Pakistan to maintain good relations with all countries, particularly the United States.

In a 2022 speech, Khan referenced a clip of Maryam Nawaz repeatedly mentioning him. He said: "She took my name so many times and with so much passion...Maryam, please be careful, your husband might get upset." According to Dawn, his remarks followed her repeated tirades against him and Bushra Bibi. The Human Rights Commission of Pakistan condemned Khan's remarks, saying they "plumbed the depths of misogyny" and demanded an apology to Maryam and all women.

=== Toshakhana reference and disqualification ===
The First Shehbaz Sharif government filed the Toshakhana case against Khan in August 2022, alleging he failed to disclose official gifts and their sale proceeds to the Election Commission of Pakistan (ECP), and did not declare the proceeds for tax purposes.

Khan reportedly retained 58 gifts, 14 valued over Rs 14,000 each. On 8 September, he rejected the allegations and asked the ECP to dismiss the case, saying all purchases were lawfully declared in his tax returns and wealth statements. Hearings were delayed as his legal team sought extensions.

On 21 October 2022, the ECP disqualified Khan under Article 63(1)(p) of the Constitution, ruling he submitted a false statement and incorrect asset declaration for 2020–21. A four-member bench unanimously found he had misled officials about Toshakhana gifts and ordered criminal proceedings under the Election Act, 2017.

=== Assassination attempt ===
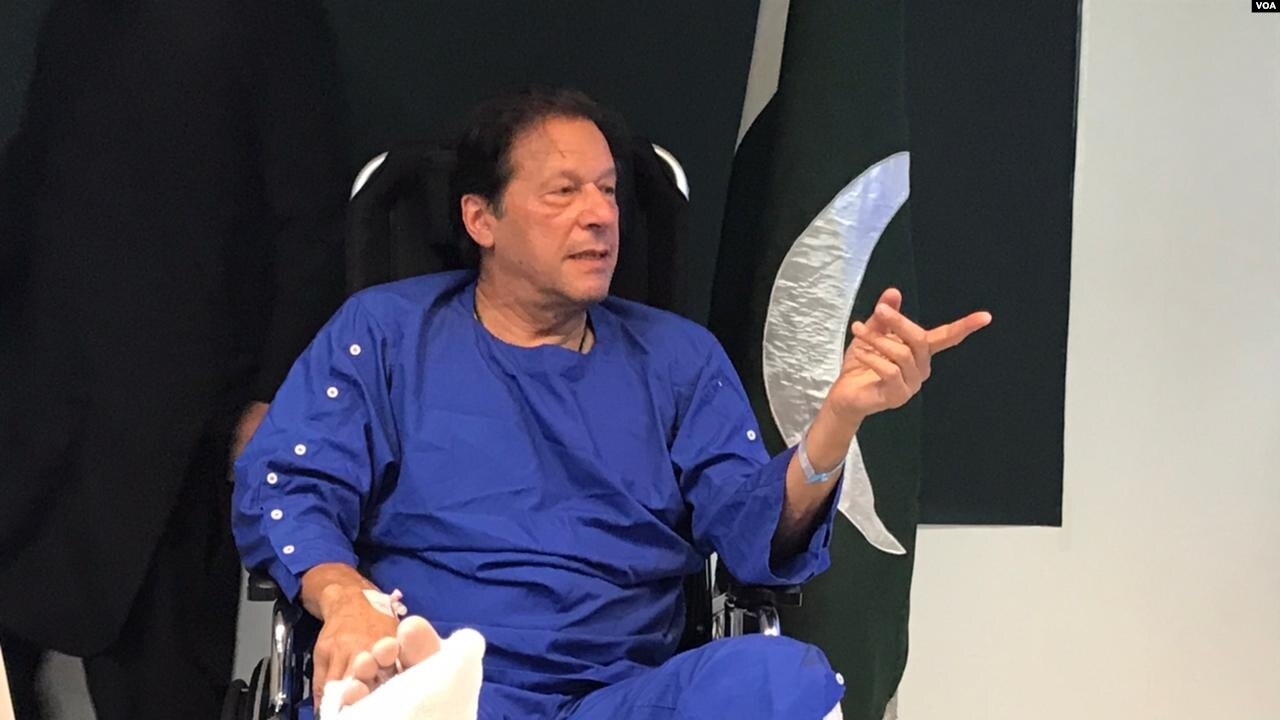
Khan speaking to media at Shaukat Khanum hospital after treatment

On 3 November 2022, Khan was shot in the leg when gunmen opened fire on his convoy in Wazirabad while he was leading a march to Islamabad demanding early elections. One of his supporters died in the attack. The alleged perpetrator, Muhammad Naveed, was overpowered by a supporter of Khan, throwing off his aim. Naveed said he acted alone, targeting him because he believed Khan was misleading the people. Khan blamed the incumbent government—Prime Minister Shehbaz Sharif, Interior Minister Rana Sanaullah, and Major General Faisal Naseer—for the assassination plot but provided no evidence. Government and military officials denied involvement. Federal Information Minister Maryam Aurangzeb questioned how Khan could demand resignations before any investigation. The Inter-Services Public Relations called the allegations baseless and irresponsible. Sanaullah also rejected them as grievous.

=== Arrest and case proceedings ===
Following an arrest warrant, the Islamabad Police and Lahore Police moved to arrest Khan on 14 March 2023. On 9 May, he was arrested at the Islamabad High Court in connection with the Al-Qadir Trust case. His arrest triggered the May 9 riots, with PTI supporters storming government buildings and military installations. The Supreme Court of Pakistan declared the arrest illegal, citing the violation of judicial sanctity by paramilitary forces. On 12 May, he received protective bail, which barred re-arrest on the same charges for two weeks.

On 5 August, he was arrested again and sentenced to three years after being found guilty of misusing his premiership to buy and sell state gifts, valued over 140 million rupees. On 29 August, an appeals court suspended his corruption conviction and prison term, granting him bail. A special court ordered that he remain in jail in the cypher case, in which he was accused of leaking state secrets and violating the Official Secrets Act. In 2024, he was convicted and sentenced in the cypher case, the Toshakhana-I case, and the Iddat case. The convictions in the cypher and iddat cases were subsequently overturned, while the 14-year sentence in the Toshakhana-I case remained suspended pending appeal as of August 2026.

In January 2025, he was sentenced to 14 years' imprisonment by an accountability court in the Al-Qadir Trust case. The case alleges that Khan and his wife Bushra obtained billions of rupees and land worth hundreds of kanals from Bahria Town in connection with the alleged legalisation of Rs50 billion that had been returned to Pakistan by the UK authorities. Funds recovered by the UK's National Crime Agency were alleged to be Pakistani state funds and were transferred to Supreme Court accounts to offset Bahria Town's liability from a settlement over illegally acquired land. In the Al-Qadir Trust case, Khan and Bushra, the trust's sole trustees, were alleged to have obtained over 458 acres land from Bahria Town for Al-Qadir University, Jhelum.

In December 2025, he was sentenced to 17 years' imprisonment and fined Rs16.4 million in the Toshakhana-II case. The court found that a Bulgari jewellery set gifted by Saudi Crown Prince Mohammed bin Salman, valued at about Rs80 million, was acquired by Khan for Rs2.9 million. It credited time served and described the sentence as lenient due to his old age.

=== Imprisonment and jail conditions ===
Khan says his imprisonment is politically motivated, alleging involvement by the Pakistan Armed Forces (the Establishment) and Shehbaz Sharif's government. Both the military and government denied the allegations; the military called them "fabricated and malicious" while Sharif termed them "blatant lies". Since his arrest, he has been held in Adiala Jail in Rawalpindi, where the special court conducts his trial.

In June 2024, the Working Group on Arbitrary Detention called for his release, saying his detention was arbitrary and politically motivated. In a July interview with The Sunday Times from prison, he said he is held in a small "death cell" usually "reserved for terrorists". In August 2024, Khan alleged the ISI controls all matters of his imprisonment and has made his jail conditions harsher. In September 2024, Amnesty International said it had "noted a pattern of weaponisation of the legal system to keep him detained and away from political activity" and called for his immediate release. In October 2024, authorities said he undergoes a medical examination every two weeks and no health issues have been observed.

On 24 November, Khan's supporters attempted nationwide protests demanding his release. Since the 2022 no-confidence vote, he has been named in 186 legal cases across Pakistan, as reported in December 2024.

In February 2026, fourteen former international cricket captains appealed to Pakistan's government, expressing "profound concern" over reports on Khan's health and prison conditions. That month, more than 40 international public intellectuals, academics and activists issued a humanitarian appeal calling for Khan's release and urgent access to his family and physicians.

In August, the Supreme Court ordered Khan's transfer to the private Shifa International Hospital in Islamabad over blood pressure and anxiety concerns, but he was instead taken to the state-run Pakistan Institute of Medical Sciences for a medical examination before being returned to his cell. During the hospital visit, his sister, who is also a doctor and personally checked his blood pressure, said that Khan was "completely healthy and fit", with his blood pressure at 120/80 and his eyesight having improved.

=== 2024 Pakistani general election ===
In December 2023, he nominated Gohar Ali Khan to replace him as PTI chairman, with Gohar being elected unopposed. Later that month, the ECP rejected his nomination papers for the 2024 Pakistani general election on the grounds that he was "convicted by the court of law and has been disqualified". Before the elections, his name was barred from the media, and TIME reported that constituency boundaries were redrawn to allegedly benefit his opponents.

A PTI official said he was allowed to vote by postal ballot from prison. He issued an AI-generated message urging supporters to celebrate the electoral win, in which at least 90 candidates backed by him, all of whom were forced to run as independents, won seats. PTI chairman Gohar Ali Khan said Khan directed PTI-backed independents to form governments in the Centre, Khyber Pakhtunkhwa, and Punjab. Gohar said Khan told his party to sit in opposition nationally rather than join a coalition with rival parties, including the Pakistan Muslim League (N) and Pakistan Peoples Party.

== Wealth and assets ==
In his 2003 statement to the Election Commission of Pakistan (ECP), Khan declared his home in Zaman Park, Lahore, an Islamabad apartment, 39 kanals (Note: 5 acres) in Islamabad, 530 kanals (Note: 66 acres) in Khanewal, and a share in 363 kanals (Note: 44 acres) of inherited agricultural land.

In a 2011 Financial Times interview, Khan said he bought a penthouse in South Kensington in 1983 for £110,000 and sold it in 2003 to buy land in Islamabad.

In 2017, the ECP reported that Khan's 300-kanal Bani Gala residence in Islamabad was valued at Rs. 750 million (US$2.7 million), with other assets including furniture worth Rs. 0.6 million (US$2,100) and livestock. In 2020, the ECP reported that he declared assets worth Rs80.6 million, including a six-kanal plot in Mohra Noori (Rs0.5 million) and five inherited plots in Mianwali, Bhakkar, Sheikhupura, and Khanewal. He sold property in Ferozewala for Rs70 million and bought two Shahrah-e-Dastoor apartments for Rs10.19 million. Khan held Rs50.66 million in a bank account, Rs10.99 million in cash, and four foreign currency accounts with £518, $328,760, $1,470, and an empty euro account. He also declared four goats worth Rs200,000.

In his 2024 election nomination papers, Khan declared over Rs90 million in bank accounts, more than $300,000 in a foreign currency account, and over a dozen properties, mostly inherited, including agricultural land and his Zaman Park residence. He paid Rs11.97 million for a Shahrah-e-Dastoor apartment and declared Rs11.47 million for his Bani Gala residence. He reported owning no vehicle.

=== Taxes ===
The News International reported that Khan paid nearly Rs4.7 million in taxes between 1981 and 2017, with exemptions in several years. In January 2022, the Federal Board of Revenue's 2019 tax directory said that he paid Rs9.8 million in taxes that year. In 2022, his income rose to Rs185.68 million due to the sale of a watch gifted by a foreign dignitary; the year before, it was just over Rs7 million. For the fiscal year ending 30 June 2023, he paid Rs15.59 million in taxes, and his total declared assets were Rs315.95 million.

== Political positions ==
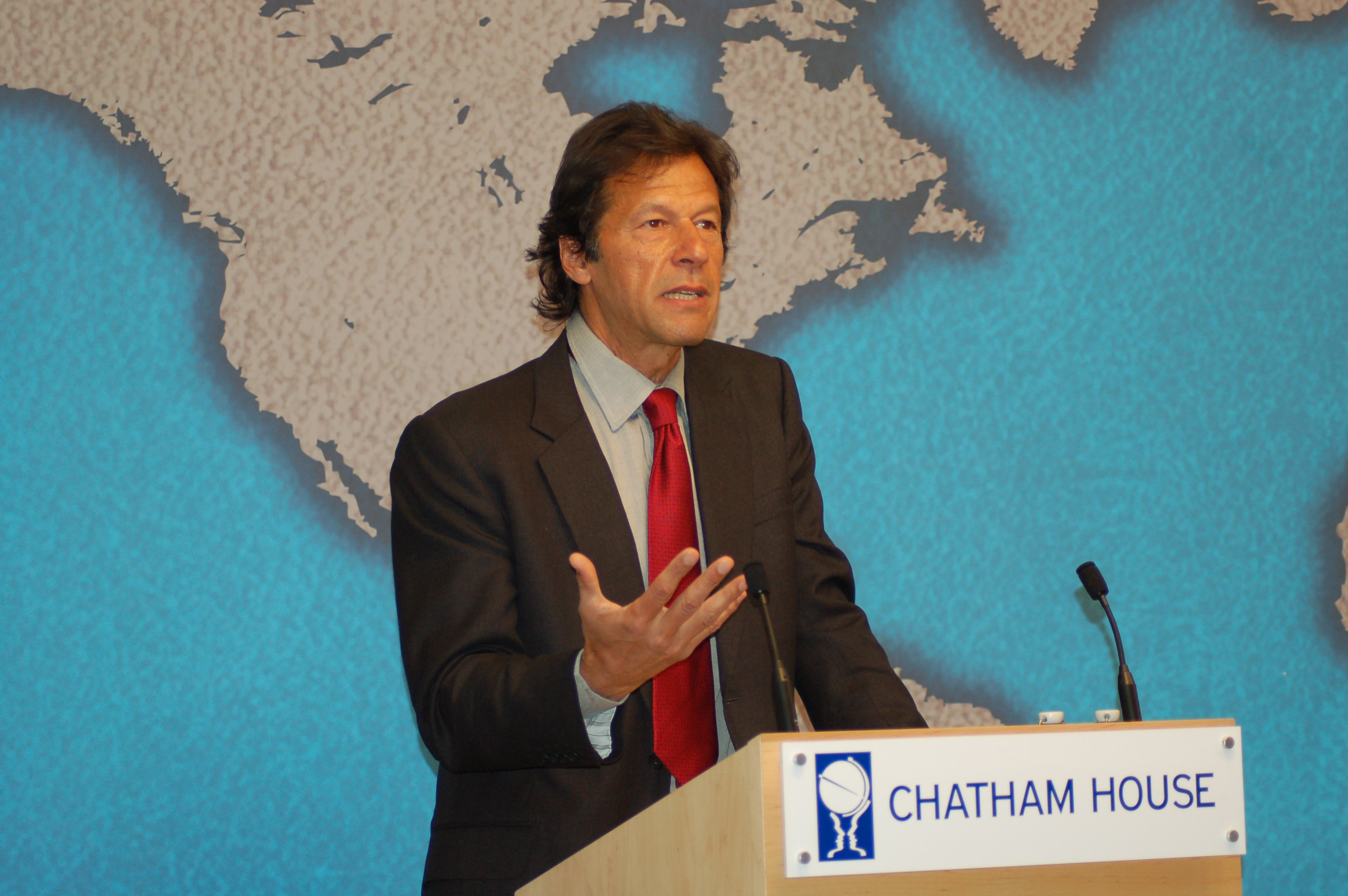
Khan speaking at the Chatham House in London, 2012.

In November 1999, Khan condemned the UN for failing to halt Russian "atrocities" in Chechnya.

After the 2003 invasion of Iraq began, Khan participated in a protest in Hyde Park, London, saying: "The fear is that this is not going to be the last war; first it was Afghanistan, now it's Iraq, and if the hawks in Washington have their way, then it's going to be some other country very soon."

A January 2010 leaked US diplomatic cable released by WikiLeaks revealed that US ambassador to Pakistan Anne W. Patterson met Khan at his residence, where he criticised the US for its "dangerous" policies, including drone operations.

In 2011, Khan became the first Pakistani dignitary to demand an official apology from the Government of Pakistan to the people of Bangladesh for the Pakistan Army's atrocities during the Bangladesh Liberation War in 1971. He said he had initially supported the operation due to Pakistan's lack of independent media but later learned the truth from Bengali friends in England, adding that Pakistan must learn from past mistakes and not repeat them in Balochistan or the tribal areas.

Prime Minister Khan's message on the 25th Memorial Day of the Srebrenica Genocide, 2020

He has described himself as a pacifist and anti-war and has opposed military interventions, especially in Afghanistan, criticising Pakistan's role in the U.S.-led war on terror. He has opposed the Iraq War, the Russian Invasion of Ukraine, the Gaza genocide, and the Israeli invasion of Lebanon.

In 2013, Khan proposed secret talks between India and Pakistan to resolve the Kashmir issue, saying open negotiations risk being subverted by vested interests on both sides.

In 2014, when the Pakistani Taliban announced armed struggle against Ismailis and the Kalash people, Khan described "forced conversions as un-Islamic." He also condemned the "forced conversion" of Hindu girls in Sindh.

== Public image ==
In the 1980s, Khan sported a "playboy" image in the British press for his exploits on the London party circuit, though he said he never consumed liquor. In the early 1990s, the British media called him the Sexiest Man Alive. Millions of cricket followers knew him by the nickname "Lion of Lahore".

In 1996, The Wall Street Journal said he used populist rhetoric, blending anti-elite messages with religious appeals. His criticism of Westernised Pakistani elites contrasted with his privileged upbringing and western "jet-setter" lifestyle. He said of his past: "I have never claimed to be an angel. I am a humble sinner." In a 2006 interview, Peter Lloyd described his transformation as a "playboy to puritan U-turn," leaving many scratching their heads in wonder. In 2007, Der Spiegel compared him to Franz Beckenbauer for his popularity and influence in Pakistan. In 2018, Reuters described him as a Pakistani cricket icon and former London playboy who had "transformed himself into a pious, firebrand nationalist".

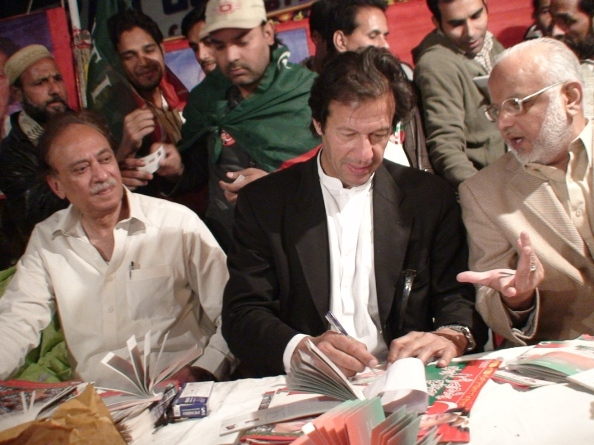
Imran Khan signs autographs for supporters, 2009

In June 2011, a Pew Research Center poll showed him with a 68% approval rating, higher than Prime Minister Yousaf Raza Gillani's 37% and President Asif Ali Zardari's 11%. That year, The Washington Post described him as an underdog, saying he "often sounds like a pro-democracy liberal but is well known for his coziness with conservative Islamist parties." H. M. Naqvi called him a "sort of a Ron Paul figure," noting "there is no taint of corruption and there is his anti-establishment message."

His perceived sympathy for the Taliban and criticism of the US-led war on terror led critics to label him "Taliban Khan." He said, "I've been called Taliban Khan for supporting the tribal Pashtuns and I've been called part of a Jewish conspiracy to take over Pakistan. I am of course neither."

In 2012, Pankaj Mishra, writing for The New York Times, characterised him as a "cogent picture out of his—and Pakistan's—clashing identities," adding that "his identification with the suffering masses and his attacks on his affluent, English-speaking peers have long been mocked in the living rooms of Lahore and Karachi as the hypocritical ravings of 'Im the Dim' and 'Taliban Khan'—the two favoured monikers for him." Mishra concluded, "like all populist politicians, he appears to offer something to everyone. Yet the great differences between his constituencies—socially liberal, upper-middle-class Pakistanis and the deeply conservative residents of Pakistan's tribal areas—seem irreconcilable."

After the 2013 election, Mohammed Hanif, writing for The Guardian, said that he had support among the educated middle class, but Pakistan's main problem was that it did not have enough educated urban middle-class citizens.

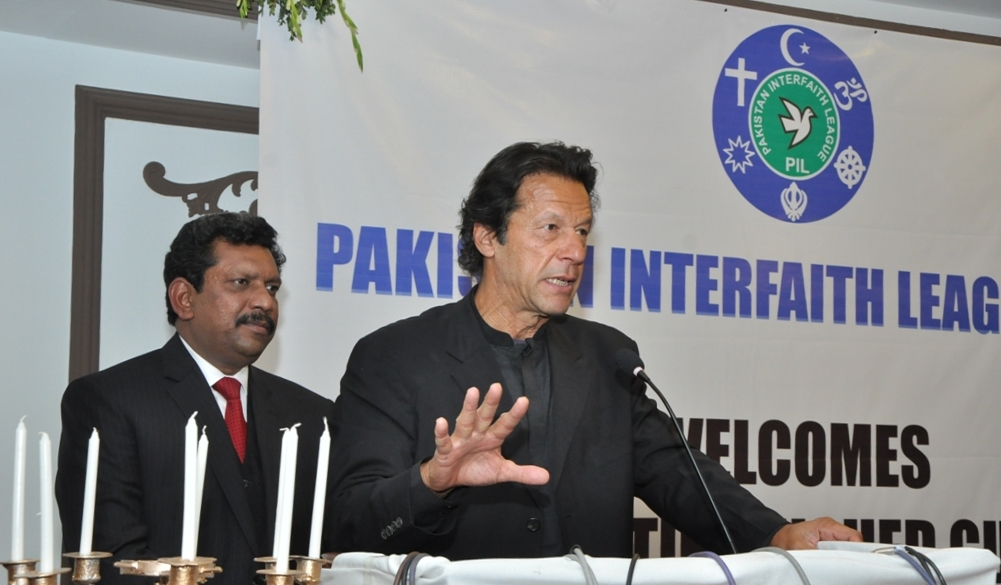
Khan addressing an Interfaith Christmas Dinner in 2014

An August 2018 Gallup Pakistan survey found 52% of Pakistanis believed his tenure as prime minister would be better than the previous government. In a 2019 International Republican Institute poll, 40% of respondents rated his performance "good" and 17% "very good." A 2021 Ipsos Pakistan survey found 55% of respondents said Imran Khan government was worse than they expected. In a 2022 Gallup Pakistan poll, 48% of respondents had a negative view of his performance, while 36% held a favourable opinion. Another Gallup Pakistan survey, conducted after his vote-of-no confidence, found 57% of respondents were happy about his removal from office, while 43% were angry. A February 2023 Gallup Pakistan survey, conducted after the end of his premiership, found that 61% of Pakistanis held a good opinion of him.

His arrest and imprisonment in August 2023 angered many in Indian-administered Kashmir.

According to a January 2024 Bloomberg survey of 12 Pakistani financial professionals, Khan was the top pick to run the country's economy.

Khan has been nominated twice for the Nobel Peace Prize. He was nominated in 2019 for his endeavours to foster peace across South Asia. In 2025, he was nominated by the Norwegian political party Partiet Sentrum and the advocacy organisation Pakistan World Alliance for his contributions to human rights and democratic values.

In March 2026, American human rights lawyer Eric Lewis wrote in The Independent that Khan had been "wrongly imprisoned for almost three years" and that "the world community should unite to save him."

=== Relationship with the military ===
According to Christopher Clary, Assistant Professor of Political Science at the State University of New York-Albany, he entered politics in the mid-1990s in open alliance with former Inter-Services Intelligence (ISI) chief Hamid Gul. In 2012, author Fatima Bhutto criticised him for "incredible coziness not with the military but with dictatorship," accusing him of defending General Zia-ul-Haq's legacy and mentioning his support for Pervez Musharraf's 2002 referendum.

According to Clary, Khan was also "close to another former ISI head, Shuja Pasha". Clary said that during the 2014 Tsunami March and sit-in, there were widespread allegations of involvement by then ISI chief Zaheer-ul-Islam. Historian Ian Talbot wrote that Khan's role in the 2014 protests was contentious. Talbot stated that Khan "denied that he was a military cat's paw", which Talbot said conflicted with former PTI president Javed Hashmi's claim that the protests were inspired by Pasha. Talbot said that his actions, "if not sinister, were reckless", threatening hopes of rebalancing civil–military relations in Pakistan. He stated that these actions strengthened military authority over civilian power, and that "the army rather than the democratic forces had clearly emerged as a winner in the political crisis that some believed it had secretly orchestrated".

According to Mohammad Waseem, Professor of Political Science at the Lahore University of Management Sciences, his populist rise was enabled by the military establishment, which sought to counter the PPP and PML (N). Waseem said he was cultivated by the establishment as an alternative force, with the PTI functioning as a "shadow" Muslim League to attract electables before the 2018 election. Waseem said that he appealed to middle-class demands to end dynastic politics and came to power not through mass mobilisation, but military support. He added that he was portrayed at home and abroad as the military's preferred candidate, fuelling opposition claims that he was "selected" rather than elected.

US diplomat Theodore Craig, in Pakistan and American Diplomacy, wrote that after the 2018 elections the United States avoided pushing for an "unblemished election" or rejecting "antidemocratic manipulations", saying that challenging "the military's Imran Khan project" would not have changed the government but could have jeopardised prospects for progress in Afghanistan.

In 2024, The New York Times wrote that Lt. Gen. Faiz Hameed, a former ISI chief, was an ally of his. In 2024, Arab News wrote that Khan was widely believed to have risen to power in 2018 with military backing. Arab News said that after his 2022 ouster, Hameed was widely believed to have advised him as PTI openly criticised the army and its senior leadership. Since then, Khan has campaigned against the military, blaming it for failing to stop the no-confidence motion that removed him.

Ashok Swain, Professor of Peace and Conflict Research at Uppsala University, Sweden, wrote that his challenges and accusations against the military are unique in Pakistan's history. Swain said he became the military's strongest critic, with potential to reform its historically unchecked power. His approach has divided allies and the military but, according to Swain, "mobilised a new generation of politically aware Pakistanis, including women and youth who previously shunned politics".

In a 2025 book, author Dinkar Prakash Srivastava wrote that Khan enjoyed military patronage and "colluded" with it against Prime Minister Nawaz Sharif. He wrote that the army "paved the way" for his 2018 election victory by easing out Sharif's government before the end of its term. Khan's relations with the military began to deteriorate in 2021 over the appointment of the ISI chief. After his ouster in 2022, Khan blamed army chief General Qamar Javed Bajwa and criticised the military leadership, including General Asim Munir and the ISPR. Srivastava wrote that if Khan sought to divide the top military leadership, it "backfired spectacularly" as the army "does not tolerate interference" in its internal affairs, and that Khan "found himself accidentally thrust into the role of an anti-establishment hero", despite owing his political career to military patronage.

In December 2025, Mohammed Hanif wrote that early in his political career, Khan found out that "the road to power in Pakistan always passed through the army headquarters," and they helped him rise by sidelining his opponents. After falling out with them, his name and image were suppressed on television, and his access to family and lawyers was restricted.

=== In popular culture ===
During his cricketing days, he appeared in commercials for Pepsi Pakistan, Brooke Bond tea, Thums Up, and the Indian soap Cinthol. Dev Anand offered him a role in his 1990 Bollywood sports action-thriller Awwal Number as a declining cricket star, but he refused, citing his lack of acting skills. In 2014, Canadian rock band Nickelback released the politically themed single "Edge of a Revolution", featuring a brief clip of a PTI rally with party flags and a poster of him.

Chacha Nooruddin, known as Captain Chappal, gifted a pair of specially crafted Peshawari chappals to him for his 2015 wedding. The double-soled design had existed for years, but the traditional Peshawari chappal became iconic as his preferred footwear.

In the 2021 Indian film 83, about the 1983 Cricket World Cup, he is portrayed by actor Chunky Panday.

== Authorship ==
In the late 1980s, Khan served as editor of The Cricketer, a London-based cricket magazine. Khan has written opinion pieces for Outlook, The Guardian, and the BBC. Khan's 2011 autobiography, Pakistan: A Personal History, covers his move from cricket into politics and discusses his philanthropic work. In 2021, Khan penned a CNN op-ed advocating conservation and restoration of damaged natural ecosystems.

Khan's publications include:

- West and East (Macmillan, 1975)
- Imran: The Autobiography of Imran Khan (Pelham, 1983)
- Imran Khan's Cricket Skills (Hamlyn, 1989)
- Indus Journey: A Personal View of Pakistan (Chatto & Windus, 1991)
- All Round View (Mandarin, 1992)
- Warrior Race: A Journey Through the Land of the Tribal Pathans (Chatto & Windus, 1993)
- Pakistan: A Personal History (Bantam Press, 2011)
- Main Aur Mera Pakistan (Orient, 2014)

== See also ==
- Electoral history of Imran Khan
- Imran Khan Cricket Stadium
- Goldsmith family
- List of sportsperson-politicians
- 2011 Minar-e-Pakistan PTI Jalsa

== Bibliography ==
- Bermange, Benedict (28 December 2020). Picking the Perfect Cricket Team. Pen & Sword Books. ISBN 978-1-5267-6971-8.
- Booth, Lawrence, ed. (11 April 2019). The Shorter Wisden 2019: The Best Writing from Wisden Cricketers' Almanack 2019. Bloomsbury Publishing. ISBN 978-1-4729-6387-1.
- Clary, Christopher (17 May 2022). The Difficult Politics of Peace: Rivalry in Modern South Asia. Oxford University Press. p. 271. ISBN 978-0-19-763843-9.
- Craig, Theodore (2024). Pakistan and American Diplomacy: Insights from 9/11 to the Afghanistan Endgame. University of Nebraska Press. ISBN 9781640126008.
- Hutchins, Chris; Midgley, Dominic (2015), Goldsmith: Money, Women and Power, BookBaby, p. 173, ISBN 978-0-9933566-3-6
- Jaffrelot, Christophe (2015). The Pakistan Paradox: Instability and Resilience. Oxford University Press. p. 279. ISBN 978-0-19-023518-5.
- Kamran, Tahir (19 August 2024). "13: Imran takes charge". Chequered Past, Uncertain Future: The History of Pakistan (2024 ed.). Reaktion Books. ISBN 978-1-78914-965-4.
- Morgan, Piers (2012). The Insider: The Private Diaries of a Scandalous Decade. Random House. p. 81. ISBN 978-1-4464-9168-3.
- Naseemullah, Adnan; Chhibber, Pradeep (2024). Righteous Demagogues: Populist Politics in South Asia and Beyond. Oxford University Press. p. 118. ISBN 978-0-19-775692-8.
- Oborne, Peter (9 April 2015). Wounded Tiger: A History of Cricket in Pakistan. Simon & Schuster UK. ISBN 978-1-84983-248-9.
- Pande, Aparna, ed. (23 August 2017). Routledge Handbook of Contemporary Pakistan. Taylor & Francis. ISBN 978-1-317-44759-7.
- Sadiq, B. J. (9 September 2017). Let There Be Justice: The Political Journey of Imran Khan. Fonthill Media. ISBN 978-1-78155-637-5.
- Srivastava, Dinkar Prakash (3 June 2025). Pakistan: Ideologies, Strategies and Interests. Bloomsbury Publishing. ISBN 978-93-6131-782-8.
- Talbot, Ian (27–30 July 2016). Civil-Military Relations in Post-2013 Pakistan (PDF). 24th European Conference on South Asian Studies (ECSAS 2016). Warsaw.
- Talbot, Ian (22 February 2022). Pakistan: A New History. Hurst Publishers. pp. 244–246. ISBN 978-1-78738-789-8.
- Waseem, Mohammad (April 2022). Political Conflict in Pakistan. Oxford University Press. ISBN 978-0-19-765426-2.
- Wilde, Simon (17 September 2013). Wisden Cricketers of the Year: A Celebration of Cricket's Greatest Players. Bloomsbury USA. p. 270. ISBN 978-1-4081-4084-0.

Sporting positions
Preceded by Zaheer Abbas	Captain of the Pakistan National Cricket Team; 1982–1983	Succeeded by Sarfraz Nawaz
Preceded by Zaheer Abbas	Captain of the Pakistan National Cricket Team; 1985–1987	Succeeded by Abdul Qadir
Preceded by Abdul Qadir	Captain of the Pakistan National Cricket Team; 1989–1992	Succeeded by Javed Miandad
Party political offices
New office	Chairman of Pakistan Tehreek-e-Insaf; 1996–2023	Succeeded by Gohar Ali Khan
Political offices
Preceded by Nasirul Mulk (Caretaker)	Prime Minister of Pakistan; 2018–2022	Succeeded by Shehbaz Sharif
Academic offices
Preceded by Betty Lockwood	Chancellor of the University of Bradford; 2005–2014	Succeeded by Kate Swann
