= List of awards and honours received by Imran Khan =

Imran Khan is a Pakistani politician and the former Prime Minister of Pakistan. Before joining politics, Khan was a cricket player and philanthropist. He was the captain of the Pakistan national cricket team which won the 1992 Cricket World Cup. After retirement, Khan focused on philanthropy work. In 1996, Khan founded the Pakistan Tehreek-e-Insaf (PTI) party.

In 1983, he was recognized by Wisden Cricketers' Almanack as the Wisden Cricketer of the Year. In 2010, he was inducted into International Cricket Council's Hall of Fame. During his cricketing career, he received numerous Player of the Match awards. He received the award on eleven occasions out of which he received five against Windies cricket team.

Imran also been known in philanthropy and is founder of two cancer hospitals and the Namal Institute, a STEM college. He has also received honorary fellowship of Royal College of Physicians of Edinburgh for his services regarding treatment of cancer patients in Pakistan. He was also inducted in Oxford University Hall of Fame.

== State honours ==
Imran Khan was captain of the Pakistan national cricket team on three occasions: 1982 – 1983; 1985 – 1987; and 1989 – 1992. In 1992, under his captaincy Pakistan team won the Cricket World Cup. This is the only time the Pakistan team has won this competition. For this achievement, Khan received the Hilal-e-Imtiaz, the second highest civilian award and honour bestowed by the Government of Pakistan. In 1983, he received the president's Pride of Performance award.

Ribbon	Decoration	Country	Date	Note	Ref.
	Pride of Performance	Pakistan	2 April 1983	The civilian honour of Pakistan for notable achievements in the field of art, science, literature, sports, and nursing.	
	Hilal-e-Imtiaz	Pakistan	1992	The second-highest civilian honour of Pakistan.	
	Order of the Renaissance	Bahrain	17 December 2019	First Class, the third-highest civilian honour of Bahrain.	

== Sporting awards ==
=== International ===
Imran Khan was described by the BBC as, "One of the finest fast bowlers cricket has ever seen." Cricinfo described him as, "The greatest cricketer to emerge from Pakistan, and arguably the world's second-best all-rounder after Garry Sobers."

- The Cricket Society Wetherall Award, leading all-rounder in English first-class cricket. (1976 and 1980).
- Wisden Cricketer of the Year (1983).
- Sussex Cricket Society Player of the Year. (1985)
- International Cricketer of the Year (1989), won a Rover 827 Vitesse valued at A$72,000.
- Indian Cricket Cricketer of the Year. (1990)
- International Cricket Council Hall of Fame, Centennial Year celebrations. (9 July 2004).
- Inaugural Silver Jubilee award, Asian Cricket Council, Karachi. (5 July 2008)
- International Cricket Council Hall of Fame (2010)
- Mohammed Bin Rashid Al Maktoum Creative Sports Award (2021)
- International Sports Personality Award, UAE (2021)

=== One Day International Cricket ===
==== Man of the Match awards ====
S No	Opponent	Venue	Date	Match Performance	Result
1	New Zealand	Trent Bridge, Nottingham	20 June 1983	79* (74 balls, 7x4, 1x6); DNB, 2 Ct.	Pakistan won by 11 runs.
2	India	Sharjah Cricket Stadium, Sharjah	22 March 1985	10–2–14–6; 0 (4 balls)	Pakistan won by 38 runs.
3	West Indies	Niaz Stadium, Hyderabad	18 November 1986	27 (21 balls: 2x6); 9–1–37–2	Pakistan won by 11 runs.
4	England	National Stadium, Karachi	20 October 1987	9–0–37–4; DNB	Pakistan won by 7 wickets.
5	West Indies	Brisbane Cricket Ground, Brisbane	7 January 1989	67* (41 balls: 7x4, 2x6); 9.4–0–42–2	Pakistan won by 55 runs.
6	West Indies	Sharjah Cricket Stadium, Sharjah	17 October 1989	60* (56 balls: 3x4); 5.4–0–21–1	Pakistan won by 57 runs.
7	Australia	Brabourne Stadium, Bombay	23 October 1989	8 (14 balls); 8–2–13–3	Pakistan won by 66 runs.
8	Sri Lanka	KD Singh Babu Stadium, Lucknow	27 October 1989	84* (110 balls: 3x4); 7–0–29–0	Pakistan won by 6 runs.
9	India	Eden Gardens, Kolkata	28 October 1989	47* (39 balls: 2x4, 2x6); DND, 1 Ct.	Pakistan won by 77 runs.
10	West Indies	Eden Gardens, Kolkata	1 November 1989	9–0–47–3; 55* (75 balls: 4x4)	Pakistan won by 4 wickets.
11	Australia	Sydney Cricket Ground, Sydney	13 February 1990	10–1–30–2; 56* (106 balls: 4x4)	Pakistan won by 6 wickets.
12	West Indies	Ibn-e-Qasim Bagh Stadium, Multan	13 November 1990	46* (59 balls: 2x4); 8–1–26–1	Pakistan won by 31 runs.
13	Sri Lanka	National Stadium, Karachi	13 January 1992	44* (27 balls: 5x4); 8–0–44–1	Pakistan won by 29 runs.

== Philanthropy and politics ==
=== Office ===
- Pakistan Tehreek-e-Insaf party, founder and chairman.
- Shaukat Khanum Memorial Cancer Hospital & Research Centre, founder and chairman of board of governors.
- Namal College, president.
- UNICEF, special representative for sports, (Promotion of health and immunisation programmes in Bangladesh, Pakistan, Sri Lanka, and Thailand).

=== Honours ===
- Oxford University Hall of Fame.
- Keble College, Oxford, Honorary Fellow, 1988.
- Lifetime achievement award, Asian jewel awards, London, 8 July 2004. ("Acting as a figurehead for many international charities, and working passionately and extensively in fund-raising activities.")
- Humanitarian award, Asian sports awards, Kuala Lumpur, 13 December 2007. (Founding the first cancer hospital in Pakistan.)
- Jinnah award, 2010.
- Royal College of Physicians of Edinburgh, honorary fellowship, 28 July 2012. (Services for cancer treatment in Pakistan through the Shaukat Khanum Memorial Cancer Hospital and Research Centre).
- In 2019, he was named one of Time magazine's 100 Most Influential People in the World.
- The 500 Most Influential Muslims ranked Khan as the world's 16th most influential Muslim in its 2020 edition. By 2022, he had risen to the top ten, securing the 10th spot. In the 2024 edition, Khan was listed among the top 50 honorable mentions under the "Rulers & Politicians" category, ranking 24th.
