= All Round View =

1988 autobiography by Imran Khan

- Author: Imran Khan
- Language: English
- Subject: Imran Khan; Cricket
- Genre: Autobiography
- Publisher: Chatto & Windus
- Publication date: 1988
- Publication place: United Kingdom
- Media type: Print
- Pages: 192
- ISBN: 978-0-7011-3330-6
- OCLC: 18326173
- LC Class: GV915.A1

All Round View is a 1988 autobiographical book by Pakistani cricketer and politician Imran Khan. Published by Chatto & Windus, it covers Khan's life and cricket career from his childhood in Lahore through his time at Oxford, Worcestershire, Sussex, and his captaincy of the Pakistan national cricket team. A paperback edition was later issued by Mandarin in 1992.

== Synopsis ==
The book presents Khan's account of his upbringing, his development as a cricketer, and his experiences in English county cricket and international cricket. It also reflects on the political, commercial, and tactical changes in cricket during his career, and on how he reconciled his Muslim upbringing with the pressures of being an international sportsman.

== Reception ==
The book was reviewed by the India Today and South China Morning Post.
