= University of Bradford =

Public university in Bradford, England

- Former name: Bradford Institute of Technology
- Motto: Give invention light (from Shakespeare's Sonnet 38)
- Type: Public
- Established: 1832 – Mechanics Institute; 1882 – Bradford Technical College; 1957 – Bradford Institute of Technology; 1966 – gained university status by royal charter
- Affiliations: EQUIS; AMBA; AACSB; Universities UK
- Endowment: £0.48 million (2025)
- Budget: £143.9 million (2024–25)
- Chancellor: Anita Rani
- Vice-Chancellor: Gillian Murray
- Faculty: 645 (2023/24)
- Administrative staff: 1,110 (2023/24)
- Students: 11,665 (2023/24)
- Undergraduates: 7,923 (2023/24)
- Postgraduates: 3,742 (2023/24)
- Location: Bradford, England, UK; 53°47′30″N 1°45′44″W
- Website: bradford.ac.uk

The University of Bradford is a public research university located in the city of Bradford, West Yorkshire, England. A plate glass university, it received its royal charter in 1966, making it the 40th university to be created in Britain, but can trace its origins back to the establishment of the industrial West Yorkshire town's Mechanics Institute in 1832. Known for its research, inclusivity and careers support for students, it has been named England's top university for social mobility five years in a row.

The student population includes 8,037 undergraduate and 2,850 postgraduate students. A total of 22% of students are international students and come from over 110 countries. The University of Bradford's 166,000 alumni are based across 179 countries.

It was the first British university to establish a Department of Peace Studies in 1973, which is currently the world's largest university centre for the study of peace and conflict.

== History ==
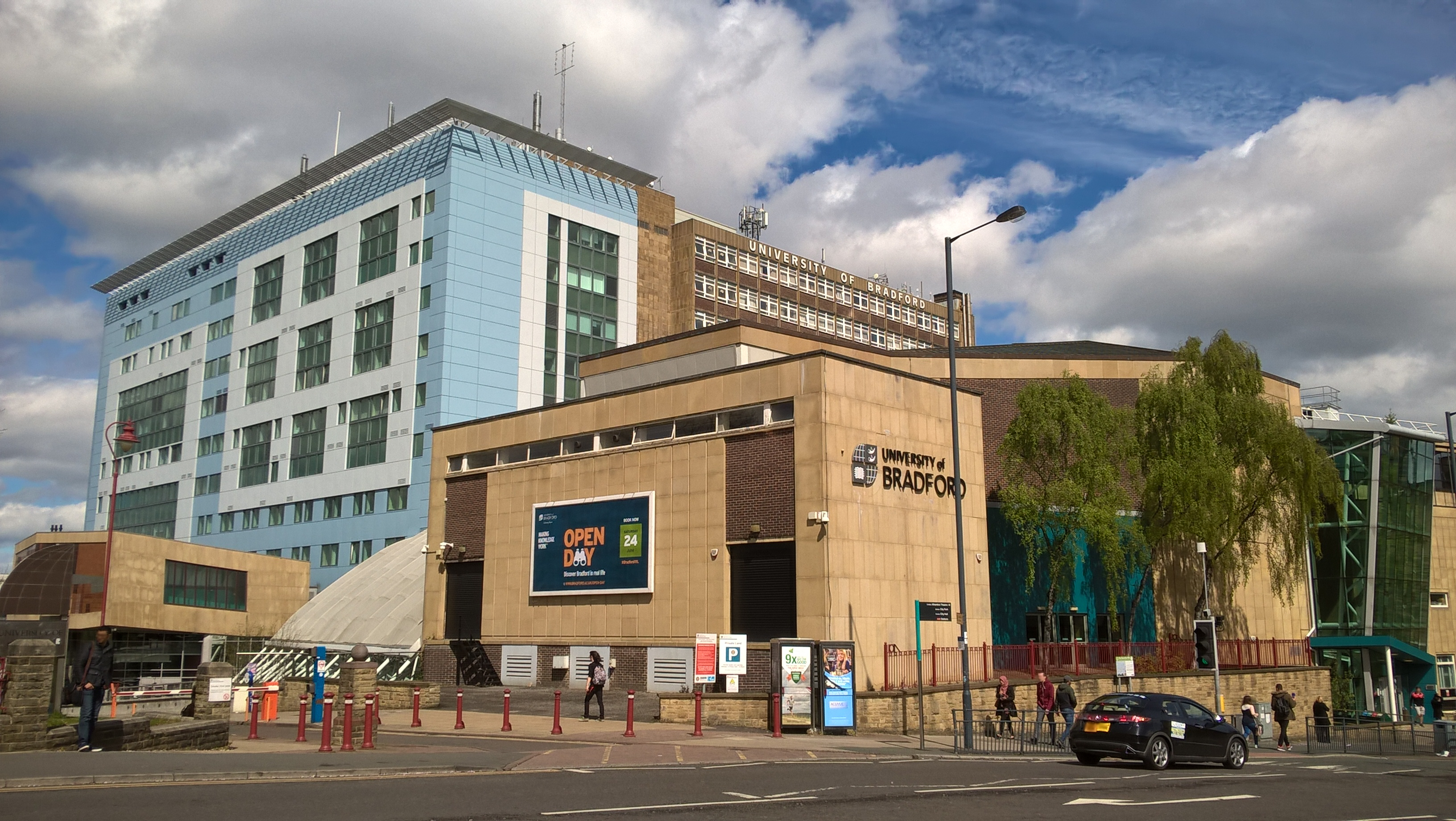
Richmond Building, University of Bradford

=== Early history ===
The university's origins date back to the Mechanics Institute, founded in 1832, formed in response to the need in the city for workers with skills relevant to the workplace. In 1882, the institute became the Bradford Technical College. In 1957, the Bradford Institute of Technology, was formed as a College of Advanced Technology to take on the running of higher education courses. Construction of the Richmond Building, the largest building on campus, began in 1963. The Horton Building and Chesham Building were subsequently added, on the opposite side of Richmond Road.

The charter of incorporation was granted in 1966, to create the University of Bradford; the then Prime Minister Harold Wilson became the university's first chancellor. In 1970s the university became an important international centre in the field of Yugoslav studies with the establishment of the University of Bradford Postgraduate School of Yugoslav Studies serving as a core institution in this effort. Research Unit in Yugoslav Studies at Bradford was established already in 1965 with significant involvement of British geographer Frederick Bernard Singleton. After her exile from South Africa, AnnMarie Wolpe gained a post at the Bradford Department of Yugoslav Studies in 1963.

=== 1980s and 1990s ===
Expansion of the main campus continued in the 1970s and onwards, with the addition of the Library and Computer Centre, Communal Building, Pemberton Building and Ashfield Building. An extension to the Library and Computer Centre was completed in the mid-1990s. In 1996, the university joined with the former Bradford and Airedale College of Health, which then became the School of Health Studies within the university. The Department of Physics was closed in the 1980s. The Department of Mathematics was closed to new undergraduates in 1997, with the remaining postgraduate activities and lecture support being integrated into the Department of Computing as the Mathematics Unit. The Department of Mathematics has since been reopened within the School of Computing, Informatics and Media.

In 1987, the university became one of the twelve founding members of the Northern Consortium.

== Campus ==
=== Facilities ===
In 2005, a project to become an 'Ecoversity' was initiated, along with an £84 million redevelopment of the campus. The university aimed to reduce its environmental footprint by reducing waste and using sustainable materials. As part of this, Bradford became a Fairtrade University in December 2006.

As of 2008, several of the redevelopment projects have been completed. The Richmond Building has been partially re-clad with extra insulation and a new atrium; designed by local Saltaire-based architects Rance Booth & Smith; opened in December 2006, the roof of which uses ETFE – the same material used in the Eden Project. The university's cancer therapeutics research centre was moved from a separate site on All Saint's Road onto the main campus, into a new building which also provides conference facilities; the buildings on the old site were demolished in February 2008.

Redevelopment of the sports facilities was completed in summer 2009, and a new student village called "The Green" was constructed which opened in September 2011. The Green has the highest ever BREEAM rating for any building. Of the existing halls owned by the university, those on the Laisteridge Lane site were sold to Corporate Residential Management in 2005, and Shearbridge Green Halls were demolished in December 2006. Longside Lane halls and Kirkstone Halls were demolished during the first half of 2009.

The university has a "leading-edge 100-seat PC cluster" for teaching, learning and computer-based assessment, and there is an art gallery, theatre and music centre. The £84 million investment in the campus included a major refurbishment of the laboratories in the school of life sciences, creation of a new MBA suite and library at the school of management, refurbishment of the student union building, Student Central.

The university has won its campus the award for 'Outstanding Contribution to Sustainable Development' in The Times Higher Education Awards two years running.

In 2021, university campus buildings underwent a £3.5 million facelift, working on improving energy efficiency and reducing carbon emissions. Upgrades to the campus were performed on the Richmond Building and Horton Building. Additionally, in 2022 the university was donated £2 million by former Intel CTO and Bradford alumni, Dr. Venkata "Murthy" Renduchintala, to develop the "Murthy-Renduchintala Centre for Space AI" and announced plans to launch a prototype PocketQube satellite by 2024.

In 2024, the university invested £2 million into its former bars and venue spaces. Opened as part of a major refurbishment of campus social facilities in the mid-2020s, SC02 serves as a central hub for student life, combining informal learning environments with leisure and entertainment spaces. The venue includes a range of amenities such as food outlets, seating areas, gaming zones, and bookable function rooms, designed to support both academic work and social interaction. By day, it operates as a relaxed environment for studying and meeting, while in the evening it transforms into a lively social venue

=== JB Priestley Library ===
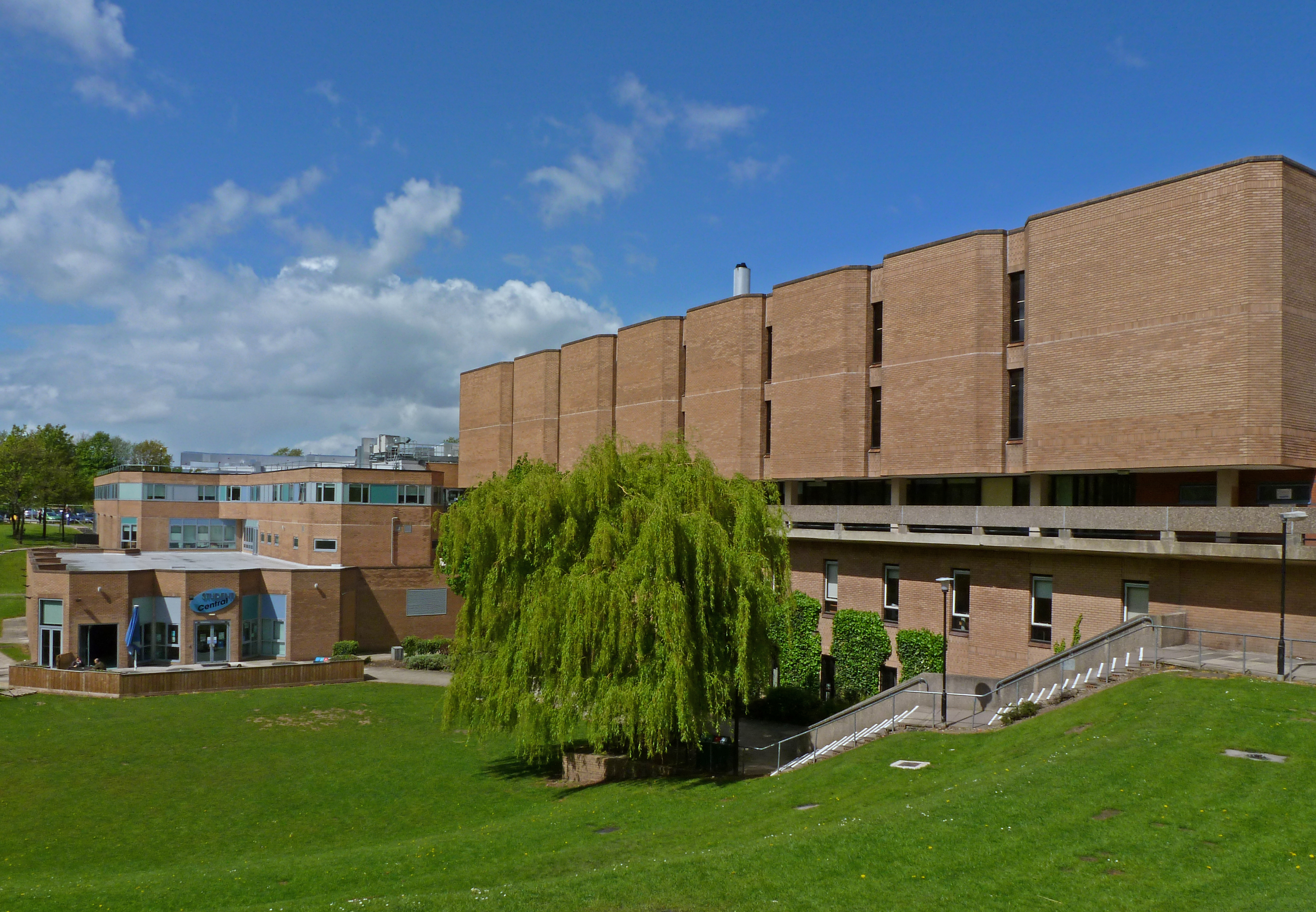
JB Priestley Library and Student Central, University of Bradford

The JB Priestley Library is open 24 hours, 360 days a year. It has 530,000 volumes, more than 1,100 printed periodical titles and approximately 60,000 electronic journals.

The library itself was opened on 18 October 1975 by J.B. Priestley - who the library is named after - as well as the then university chancellor Harold Wilson. At the time, the library boasted an impressive computer centre, occupying a whole floor out of the five available library floors. The library was then expanded further in the 1990s.

== Organisation and governance ==
=== Chancellor ===
- Harold Wilson (1966–85) (served as the prime minister of the United Kingdom from 1964 to 1970 and again from 1974 to 1976; later became the Lord Wilson of Rievaulx)
- John Harvey-Jones (1986–91)
- Trevor Holdsworth (1992–98)
- Baroness Lockwood (1998–2005)
- Imran Khan (2005–2014) (prime minister of Pakistan from 2018 to 2022)
- Kate Swann (2015–2022)
- Anita Rani (2023–Present)

The current chancellor is Bradford-born television and radio presenter Anita Rani.

=== Vice-chancellor ===
- E. G. Edwards (1966–78)
- John West (1978–89)
- David Johns (1989–98)
- Colin Bell (1998–2001)
- Chris Taylor (2001–07)
- Mark Cleary (2007–13)
- Brian Cantor (2013–2019)
- Shirley Congdon (2019-2025)
- Nick Braisby (2026) (Interim Vice-Chancellor)
- Gillian Murray (2026-)

The first vice-chancellor was Dr E.G. Edwards, who as principal of the Bradford Institute of Technology took over the new institution.

The current vice-chancellor (since 13 July 2026) is Gillian Murray.

=== Accommodation ===
The Green, which opened September 2011, is a £40 million purpose built student accommodation village. Designed for eco-friendly living, The Green has the highest ever BREEAM rating for any building (95.05%), awarded for sustainable building development and operation. It is also the first BREEAM 'Outstanding' student accommodation in the country.

=== Faculties ===
There are two academic faculties, The Faculty of Health and Social Care and the Faculty of Management, Sciences and Engineering. Many buildings and facilities, such as lecture theatres, are shared and used by all faculties. There were previously four academic faculties which were re-organised in 2025.

Faculty of Health and Social Care

- School of Nursing, Public Health and Healthcare Leadership

The School of Nursing, formerly the Airedale College of Health, became part of the university in 1996. Previously it was an associate college with the university validating its degrees. The School has moved to the main city campus, into the Horton A building which underwent major refurbishment in 2011. The Horton building was extended and another floor added to accommodate the School of Nursing. The School of Nursing was previously located on a separate site on Trinity Road, about 10 minutes walk from the main campus and near to St Luke's Hospital.

The university's nursing programmes are accredited by the Nursing and Midwifery Council. Subject areas include healthcare leadership, undergraduate nursing, postgraduate nursing and public health.

- School of Allied Health Professions, Midwifery and Social Work

Undergraduate subjects include midwifery, occupational therapy, paramedic science, physiotherapy and sports medicine, radiography, social care and community. Postgraduate subjects include radiography and medical imaging, postgraduate social work and care

- School of Pharmacy, Optometry and Medical Sciences

Undergraduate subjects include Biomedical Sciences, Clinical Sciences, Optometry and Pharmacy. Postgraduate subjects include Biomedical Science and Pharmacy and Medical Sciences.

The university opened its eye clinic in 1997, offering complete primary eye care to members of the community, and providing workplace training to its final year students.

Faculty of Management, Sciences and Engineering

- School of Management

A faculty of Management, Law, and Social Sciences was created in 2018. Management and Law, consisting of Bradford School of Management and the Law School was previously located 3 miles (5 kilometres) away from the main campus on a 13-acre (5-hectare) parkland campus, Emm Lane. In 2019, the university moved its Faculty of Management, Law and Social Sciences to its main city centre campus. The School of Management has full Economic and Social Research Council (ESRC) accreditation for DBA and PhD programmes, portfolio Association of MBAs accreditation for MBA programmes and EQUIS accreditation.

Undergraduate subjects include Accounting, Finance and Economics, Analytics, Business and Management. Postgraduate courses include Postgraduate Accounting and Finance, Postgraduate Artificial Intelligence, Postgraduate Business and Management, Postgraduate Marketing, Postgraduate Supply Chain and Data Analytics, MBA, DBA (Doctor of Business Administration) and Post Graduate Research Degrees.

- School of Law and Social Sciences

Undergraduate subjects include Archaeology, Forensics, Law and Psychology. Postgraduate subject areas include Postgraduate Archaeology and Forensics, Postgraduate Law, Postgraduate Peace Studies and International Development, Postgraduate Psychology.

- School of Computing and Engineering

The university inherited several engineering courses from the Bradford Institute of Technology. From the establishment of the university in 1966, the individual branches of engineering were taught in separate departments.

Undergraduate subjects include Computing and Engineering. Postgraduate subjects include Postgraduate Biomedical and Electronics Engineering, Postgraduate Civil and Structural Engineering, Postgraduate Chemical Engineering, Postgraduate Computing, and Postgraduate Mechanical and Energy Systems Engineering.

==== Research institutes ====
The university has two research institutes, the Institute of Health and Social Care and the Institute of Digital and Sustainable Futures.

The Institute for Health and Social Care covers Digital Innovations in Health and Social Care, Applied Health and Wellbeing, and Pharmaceutical Sciences.

The Centre for Skin Sciences is one of the largest academic centres in Britain for fundamental and translational skin and hair follicle research.

The Institute of Cancer Therapeutics is known for its research and maintains close collaboration with staff from other divisions within the School.

The Institute of Digital and Sustainable Futures covers Engineering and Artificial Intelligence, Archaeology and Management and Sustainable Development.

== Academic profile ==
=== Motto ===
The motto which appeared on many University of Bradford publications was Making Knowledge Work, which relates to the institution's focus on courses that lead to employment. The university announced in June 2007 it was to use this phrase as a trademark.

However, the motto inscribed beneath the official coat of arms is Give Invention Light, which is taken from Shakespeare's Sonnet 38. The university has also used the slogans Be Inspired and Confronting Inequality, Celebrating Diversity, Different is What We Do and It Starts in Bradford in promotional material.

=== Reputation and rankings ===
Rankings
National rankings
- Complete (2027): 98=
- Guardian (2027): 51
- Times / Sunday Times (2027): 93

Global rankings
- QS (2027): 497=
- THE (2026): 501–600

The Times Good University Guide ranked Bradford 7th in UK for graduate employment in 2005 and 2nd in 2006.

The university has a strong reputation for research and knowledge transfer. It was ranked in the Top 50 English Universities based on research funding (HEFCE 2009–10).

The 2008 RAE reported that 80 per cent of academics at the university who submitted research to the panel are doing international or world-leading research.

== Student life ==
=== Students' Union ===
Membership at the University of Bradford's Students' Union (UBU), is automatic upon confirmation of enrolment. UBU has advice services, a radio station, and runs many societies and sports clubs. The union is run by an annually elected Council, which includes an executive committee of six full-time sabbatical officers and nine non-sabbatical officers. The sabbaticals are slightly unusual within the sector, in having a 'flat structure', lacking a Union President: the post was abolished by then President Shumon Rahman in 2001.

The union is located in the Student Central building on campus, alongside the university bars, a cafe and shop, and the library. Union of Students (UBU) is available to assist students by giving necessary advice and information.

==== Activities ====
Students may make use of the 'Unique' centre which is located on campus. Facilities include a fitness suite, an indoor 25-metre swimming pool and a climbing wall.

The largest student involvement in their Union comes in the forms of the sports clubs (through the Athletics Union, commonly known as the AU), and the societies (through the Societies Federation). There is a wide variety of both, including many course related societies such as the Bradford Ophthalmic Optics Student Association. Students are also free to start their own societies.

The Student Union also has Ramair, one of the UK's longest running student radio stations, as well as a student newspaper and the long-established Bradford Student Cinema that regularly screens recent releases to students and staff for free. RamAir hosted the Student Radio Conference in 2012 with student Ian Thursfield winning a national award for Radio in 2011.

=== University Challenge ===
The university were champions of University Challenge in 1979 on 28 January 1979, when Bradford defeated Lancaster University in the third leg by 215 points to 160. It was less successful in 2004, achieving only 35 points, the joint 3rd lowest score ever recorded on the show.

== Notable alumni ==
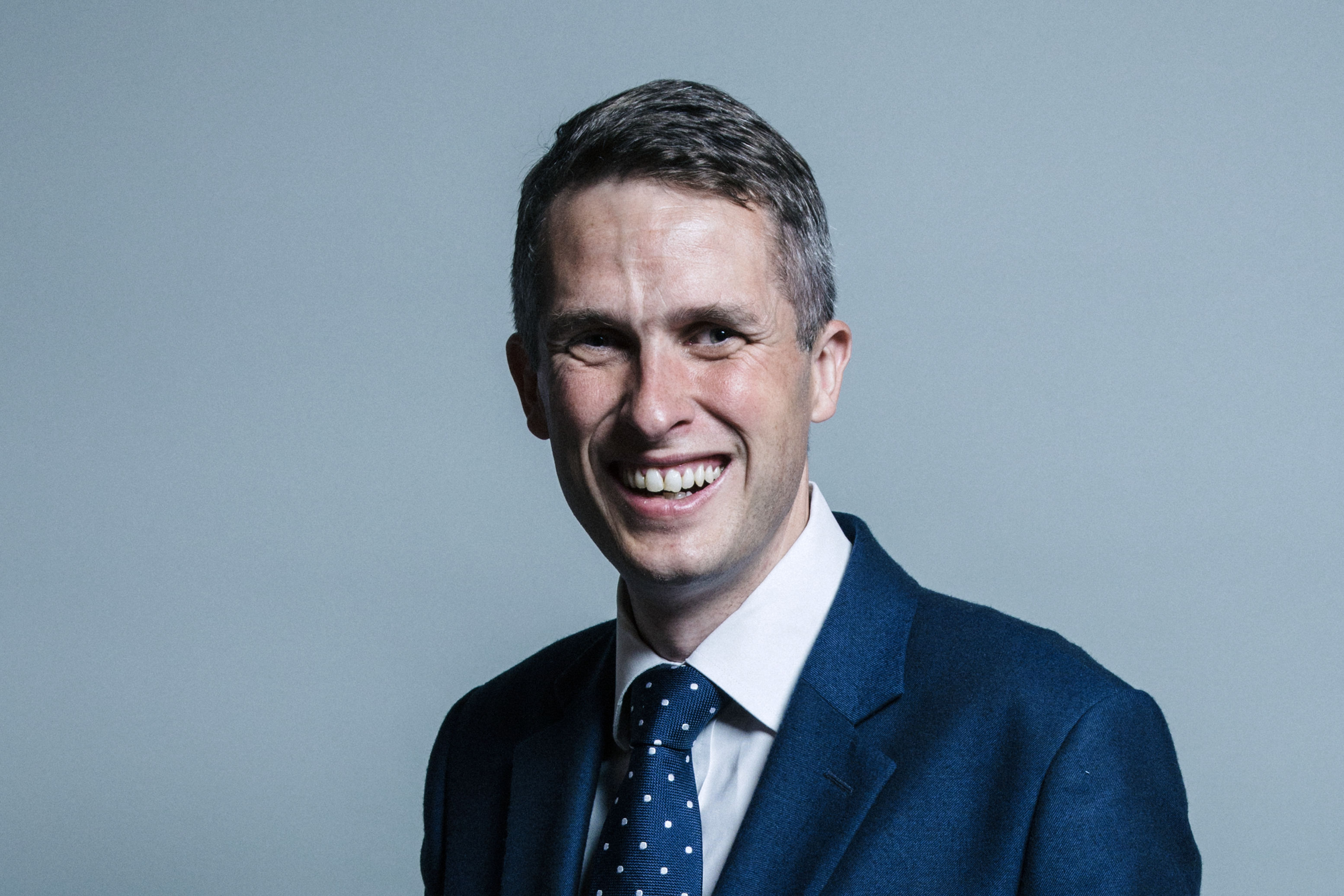
Former Secretary of State for Education Gavin Williamson graduated from Bradford with a BSc in Social Sciences.

- Melih Abdulhayoglu – founder & CEO of Comodo Group
- Rinchinnyamyn Amarjargal – former PM of Mongolia
- Mike Amesbury – Labour MP
- Raja Juli Antoni – Deputy Minister for Agrarian Affairs and Spatial Planning of Indonesia
- Nick Baines – Bishop of Bradford, Bishop of Leeds and broadcaster
- Ian Barnes – Evolutionary genetics notable for his work on ancient DNA
- Amjad Bashir – Conservative MEP
- John Beaman – Channel Islands politician
- Crawford W. Beveridge – executive vice president and chairman of Sun Microsystems
- Roland Boyes – Labour MP
- Alex Brummer – journalist
- Jean-Jacques Burnel – bass guitarist in The Stranglers
- David Chaytor – Labour MP
- Chakufwa Chihana – Malawian pro-democracy activist, trade unionist and Second Vice President of Malawi
- Michael Clapham – Labour MP
- Nexhat Daci – former speaker of the Assembly of Kosovo
- Paul Donovan – CEO of Eircom Group
- Saeb Erakat – chief of the PLO Steering and Monitoring Committee
- Dame Janet Finch – former vice-chancellor of Keele University
- Martin Fletcher – NBC News Middle East correspondent
- David J. Francis – Chief Minister of Sierra Leone
- John Gater – archaeological geophysicist, Time Team presenter
- Stephen Shaun Griffiths – serial killer
- Tori Good – BBC weather forecaster
- John Hegley – performance poet
- Stephen Hesford – Labour MP
- David Hinchliffe – Labour MP
- Felicia Hwang Yi Xin – actress, supermodel, Miss International Indonesia 2016 and Puteri Indonesia 2016 winner
- Mo Ibrahim – entrepreneur
- Frederick William Jowett – Labour MP
- Clive Lewis – Labour MP
- Jeannette Littlemore – Professor of Linguistics
- Tula Lotay – comic book artist
- Riek Machar – former vice-president of the SPLM South Sudanese government. Head of the South Sudan rebel movement. 2013–
- Bernard Mariette – global president of Quiksilver
- Steve McCabe – Labour MP
- Jon McGregor – writer
- Michael Meadowcroft – former Liberal MP
- Mehran Karimi Nasseri – Iranian refugee who lived in CDG airport
- Paul Ogwuma – Central Bank of Nigeria governor
- Stella Chinyelu Okoli – Nigerian businesswoman in pharmaceuticals
- Iffy Onuora – former footballer
- Tony O'Reilly – Chairman Independent News & Media Group, former CEO H.J. Heinz Company
- John Pienaar – BBC journalist
- Susan Price – vice-chancellor of Leeds Metropolitan University
- Gibran Rakabuming – Vice President of Indonesia
- Bell Ribeiro-Addy – Labour MP
- Linda Riordan – former Labour MP
- Lloyd Russell-Moyle – Labour MP
- Aisha Salaudeen – CNN multimedia producer
- Olusola Jegede - Nigerian lawyer and auther
- Charles Stross – Hugo Award-winning science fiction writer.
- Kate Swann – CEO of WH Smith
- Robert Swindells – author
- Ann Taylor – former Minister of State for International Defence and Security
- Benson Taylor – composer (honorary doctorate)
- Julian Thomas – Professor of archaeology at Manchester University and author of Understanding The Neolithic
- Hassan Ugail – professor
- Paula Vennells – former CEO of the Post Office
- David Ward – former Liberal Democrat MP for Bradford East
- Gavin Williamson – former UK Secretary of State for Education and former Secretary of State for Defence
- Sadegh Zibakalam – Iranian professor, writer and political analyst

== See also ==
- Armorial of UK universities
- College of advanced technology (United Kingdom)
- List of universities in the United Kingdom
- Plate glass university
