= Project Imran Khan =

Political project of Pakistani establishment

Project Imran Khan was a political project of the Pakistani military establishment to launch cricketer-turned-politician Imran Khan as a mainstream national leader and his party Pakistan Tehreek-e-Insaf as the third force in the country along with Pakistan Muslim League (N), and Pakistan People's Party. The project started in 2011 and ended in 2022 with the no-confidence motion against Imran Khan.

== Background ==
Since the 1958 Pakistani military coup, the armed forces have been playing an active role in politics both directly in the case of martial law and indirectly by creating, promoting, and supporting favorite politicians and political parties. Zulfikar Ali Bhutto, Nawaz Sharif, and several other politicians were members or products of the military establishment in one way or another.

== History ==
The Project Imran Khan was said to be initiated in 2011 by Ahmad Shuja Pasha, the Director-General of Inter-Services Intelligence. After his retirement in 2012, the project was allegedly taken forward by the Pasha's successor Zaheer-ul-Islam and used Imran Khan to force Nawaz Sharif's to resign from the government. Imran Khan's march towards Islamabad in 2014 and then the dharna at D Chowk was also said to be the result of ISI's planning but it failed.

Around 2016, the Nawas led government appointed Bajwa as Army chief, partially, because he was seen apolitical or more sympathetic to nawaz led government. Bajwa was appointed above the 2 qualified generals, but the calculation made by nawaz, couldnt stop his downfall, even after bajwa was made army chief, and bajwa led establishment didnt help nawaz to maintain power.

In 2018, Bajwa and the establishment were accused by opposition parties to have favored Khan in the 2018 Elections, including the Pakistan Muslim League (N).

== Failure and unforeseen consequences ==
In 2019, differences between Bajwa and Khan began to arise. Bajwa wanted the removal of Faiz Hameed as the DG ISI but Khan refused to do so. Also, the Chinese government was reportedly unhappy working with Khan's team on the CPEC project. The rumor was later denied by Chinese spokesperson Zhao Lijian, who was quoted, "So-called claim that little has been achieved and no programme was approved over the past three and half years… is pure disinformation," he said. "Over the three and a half years under the framework, many livelihood projects have been approved and implemented, delivering tangible benefits." Khan was later ousted in the No-confidence motion against Imran Khan, which was alleged to be facilitated by the Pakistan Army.

Khan blamed Bajwa and the army for the removal of his government, and PTI supporters started a huge social media campaign, mainly on twitter with trends being there for days, against the army and ISI. Bajwa retired on 29 November 2022 but Khan continued to criticize the army leadership.Therefore, when he was arrested on 9 May 2023, his supporters initiated a violent protest that directly challenged the Pakistani Army, with protestors entering cantonment areas and burned a Corps Commander's house in Lahore. The protestors breached the GHQ's gate though the PTI claim these protests were a "false flag operation" carried out by the ISI. Nevertheless this rare display of resistance towards the military establishment left the PTI's position untenable. Hence, a country-wide crackdown against PTI was started and thousands of its supporters were arrested on the charges of anti-state activities.
