= Pakistan: A Personal History =

2011 book by Imran Khan

- Book cover
- Author: Imran Khan
- Language: English
- Subject: Autobiography, History study
- Publisher: Bantam Press
- Publication date: 2011
- Pages: 289
- ISBN: 0-593-06774-6
- OCLC: 752163260

Pakistan: A Personal History is a 2011 book written by Imran Khan, the former Prime Minister of Pakistan and former cricketer. In the book, Khan details Pakistan's history; his political party, Pakistan Tehreek-e-Insaf; and his own life and cricket career.

== Summary ==
In Pakistan: A Personal History, Khan talks about different events in his journey to becoming one of the best all-rounders of world cricket, before becoming the head of a national political party of Pakistan. The book contains both personal stories and political commentaries. Khan detailed events from his Test cricket days, his captaincy, and the 1992 Cricket World Cup. He talked about his relationship with his ex-wife, Jemima Khan, and the "hate campaign" built around him.

== Reception ==
After the book was published in 2011, The Independent wrote in its review, "This book, an intelligently written mix of Pakistan's history and his own autobiography, reflects on the challenges that Khan faced in cricket and later, in his humanitarian work."
