= Kate Swann =

English businesswoman

Kathryn Elizabeth Swann (born 1964) is an English retailer who served as chancellor of Bradford University From April 2015 To May 2019.

== Early life ==
Born in Bishop's Stortford, Hertfordshire, Swann graduated from the University of Bradford in 1986 with a BSc in Business Management. She was ranked number 21 in the Financial Times Women in Business, Europe's top 25, in 2006. She received an honorary doctorate from the University of Bradford in July 2007.

== Career ==
Swann was made Chief Executive of food & beverage operator SSP Group in September 2013, having been CEO of WH Smith since November 2003. She previously held positions with Tesco Plc as a graduate trainee in 1989, Homepride Foods, Coca-Cola Schweppes and Dixons Stores Group. She then worked for Homebase, ultimately as Managing Director, and in 2000 was made Managing Director of Argos.

In 2006 Fortune listed her as one of the 50 most powerful women in business.

In April 2015, Swann was announced as the new chancellor of the University of Bradford.

The share price of SSP fell by 8% when it was announced in November 2018 that Swann is to step down from her post in May 2019.

Academic offices
Preceded by Imran Khan	Chancellor of the University of Bradford; 2015–present	Incumbent
