= University of Bradford Union =

Students' union in Bradford, England

- Institution: University of Bradford
- Location: Student Central, University of Bradford, Richmond Road, Bradford, West Yorkshire, England, United Kingdom, BD7 1DP
- Established: 1957 (as a Students' Union); 1966 (as a University Union)
- Chief Executive: Aleem Bashir
- Sabbatical officers: Raizana Razeen (President of Education 2025/26); Sanskrity Baraili (President of Campaigns & Welfare 2025/26); Anas Iqbal (President of Activities 2025/26)
- Trustees: All 4 Sabbatical officers; 4 external trustees; 3 student trustees including Chair of Council.
- Members: 9,960 (2020/21)
- Affiliations: National Union of Students, British Universities and Colleges Sport.
- Website: www.bradfordunisu.co.uk

The University of Bradford Union (UBU) is the students' union for the University of Bradford in Bradford, England, and is a registered charity.

== Organisation ==
UBU, referred to in full as The University of Bradford Union of Students, is led by an executive of several full-time sabbatical officers, elected annually towards the end of the academic season, and a larger number of non-sabbatical Executive Officers elected either at that same time or at the start of the academic year.

The Executive reports to a student Council that meets at least six times each academic year. Council members are elected through a combination of open places in a cross campus ballot, and from the devolved areas of responsibility — the assemblies of academic (programme and faculty) representatives, sports clubs, and activities groups (societies).

The Union is located in the Student Central building, and also runs services for international students in Room 101 in the university's Richmond Building, plus for research postgraduate students in the Postgraduate (Research) Lounge. It also looks after a Prayer Room on campus. The Union also runs outreach with the students based at Dewsbury Hospital.

== Role ==
The function of the Union is to support and provide services for its students of the university such as academic or financial advice, plus activities and entertainment, and quality and experience improvement through co-operation or lobbying at the university.

=== Student engagement ===
Student engagement with UBU comes via things like its societies and sports clubs, its academic representation system in which students can be elected representatives, and its various volunteering and charitable opportunities.

Of the many societies, some are course-related, such as the optometry society BOOSA; there are also international societies, faith groups, charitable and campaigning societies, and some purely recreational societies.

Many of the sports teams feature Bradford's traditional colours of black with red and white accents for their playing kit.

=== Campaigns ===
UBU runs campaigns on varying issues, with a focus on education and welfare, together with sustainability and diversity. Campaigns are directed by the elected leadership team, or sometimes by motions brought by students through the Council.

Past notable campaigns have included: Free Education & Grants for all — The Union has a long-standing position for free education. In 1997 the Union supported people refusing to pay the first fees including fees strikes. That latest free education policy was passed in 2008 to support the call for a national demonstration for free education. In September 2008 the General Meeting of students decided that the call for Free Education should be the campaign priority for the academic year and voted to allocate over one thousand pounds to the cause.

Palestine and Gaza — After the Union made two demands for support of Gaza of the university in 2009 over 80 students occupied the university boardroom with a number of further demands of support for Gaza. they claim to have achieved some success as of the morning of 28 January 2009. In 2007 a Bradford Student Khaled al-Mudallal became trapped in Palestine. The union ran a campaign to support Khaled and to aid his return. It was supported by UCU, the Lectures Union and the NUS the National Students' Union. He was elected the Honorary Vice President of the LSE Students' Union and released on 4 December.

In December 2023 the Union passed fresh policy calling the UK Government to "support an Inquiry into the humanitarian crisis in Gaza."

Blood Donation — UBU has supported the right for gay men to give blood with its LGBT society campaigning throughout the year of 2006 and 2007 to lift the ban. The union supported the society in encouraging people who can to give blood and to call for the ban to be lifted in favour of a ban on promiscuity and people who partake in unsafe sex giving blood.

=== Bars & retail ===
Historically, like many other students' unions, UBU ran the shops and bars on campus, and in the late 1970s the Union-run businesses had a combined annual turnover of more than £1 million. A joint board was set up during the 2010 refurbishment of the Student Central building and identified that due to significant losses the Student Union entity was no longer a viable option to manage a commercial development which resulted in the bars and shop areas falling under the University's commercial services.

The bars have been through many changes of name; one was originally the Junior Common Room. In the 2024/25 academic year, the university invested over two million pound in a major revamp of the spaces, launching in September 2024, covering most of the lowest floor of the Student Central building dubbed as SC02.
