= International Cricketer of the Year =

International Cricketer of the Year was an award given to the best player of the Australian summer cricket season, between 1979–80 and 1995–96.

The award was based on performances in tests and one day internationals. Because Australia almost always played more matches than visiting teams, points were "weighted" according to how many matches each team played. The prize often included a car.

== Winners ==
Season	Winner
1979/80	Viv Richards
1980/81	Dennis Lillee
1981/82	Bruce Yardley
1982/83	David Gower
1983/84	Viv Richards (2)
1984/85	Viv Richards (3)
1985/86	Richard Hadlee
1986/87	Chris Broad
1987/88	David Boon
1988/89	Desmond Haynes
1989/90	Imran Khan
1990/91	Simon O'Donnell
1991/92	Craig McDermott
1992/93	Curtly Ambrose
1993/94	Shane Warne
1994/95	Craig McDermott (2)
1995/96	Steve Waugh
