= Article 62 and 63 of the Constitution of Pakistan =

Articles of the Pakistani constitution

National Assembly of Pakistan
- Long title: The Constitution (Twentieth Amendment) Act, 2012
- Passed by: National Assembly of Pakistan
- Passed: April 12, 2012
- Assented to: April 19, 2012
- Commenced: April 20, 2012

In Pakistan, Article 62 and 63 of the Constitution deal with the qualifications and disqualifications of Members of Parliament.

Article 62 lays down the qualifications that a person must possess to be elected as a Member of Parliament. According to this article, a person must be of good character and reputation, possess adequate knowledge of Islamic teachings and practices, and not have been convicted of any crime involving moral turpitude. The article also requires that the person is financially sound and not subject to disqualification under any law.

Article 63, on the other hand, sets out the grounds for the disqualification of Members of Parliament. These include convictions for various offenses, such as bribery, corruption, moral turpitude, and involvement in activities prejudicial to the integrity and sovereignty of Pakistan. The article also disqualifies individuals who have defaulted on government loans or have been declared insolvent, among other things.
