= Premiership of Imran Khan =

Government of Pakistan from 2018 to 2022

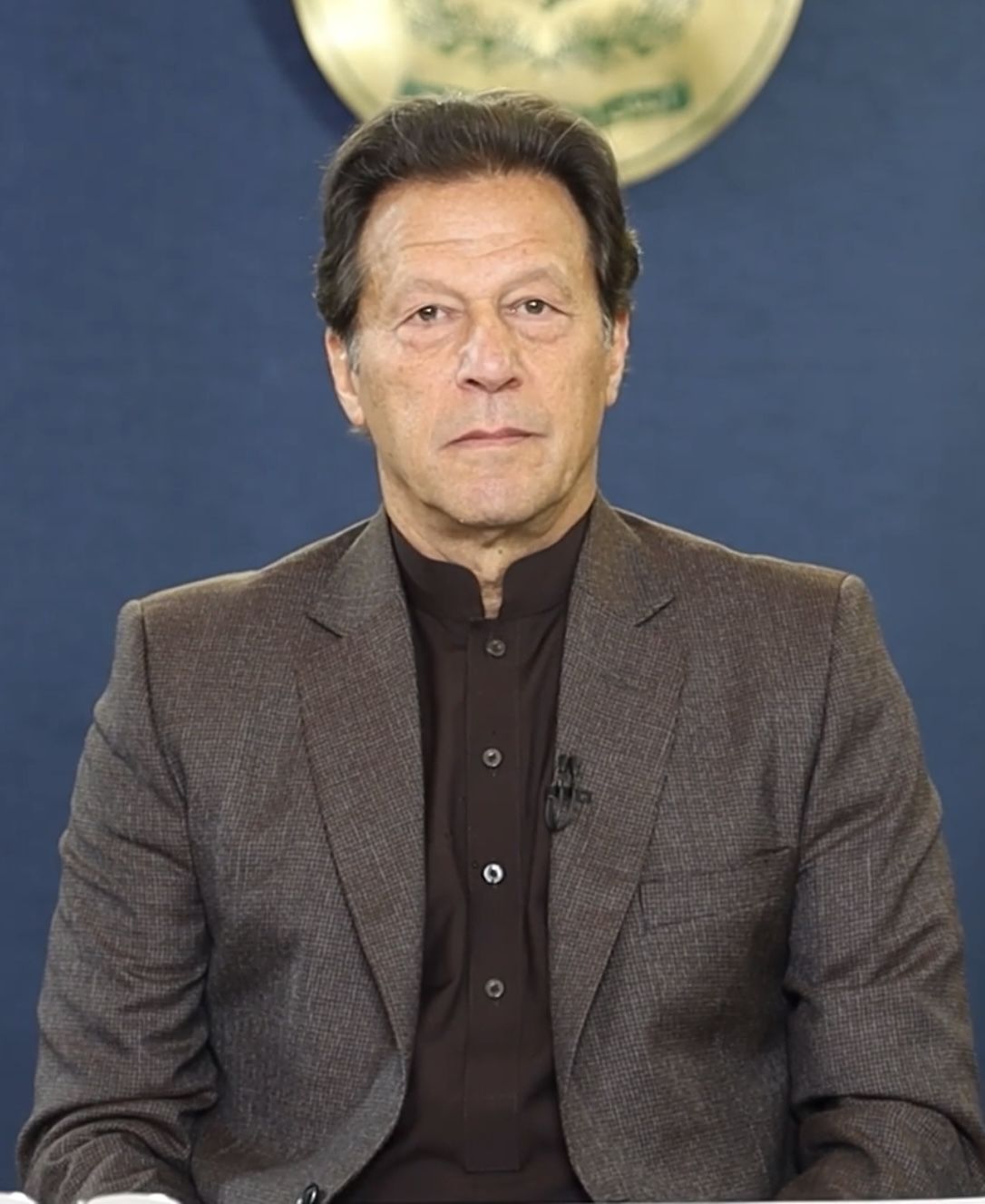
- Imran Khan as Prime Minister at Prime Minister Office in January 2022
- Premiership of Imran Khan; August 18, 2018 – April 10, 2022
- President: Mamnoon Hussain (until September 2018); Arif Alvi (after September 2018)
- Prime Minister: Imran Khan
- Cabinet: Imran Khan government
- Party: Pakistan Tehreek-e-Insaf
- Election: 2018
- Seat: Prime Minister's Office

The premiership of Imran Khan began on 18 August 2018, after his Pakistan Tehreek-e-Insaf (PTI) party secured a victory in the 2018 Pakistani general election. In his inaugural speeches, Khan articulated his vision of building Pakistan on the principles of the Islamic State of Medina. His cabinet included former Musharraf-era ministers and former members of the Pakistan People's Party.

During his tenure, Khan's government launched major infrastructure and social programs, such as the Sehat Sahulat Program for free healthcare, and initiatives aimed at improving minority rights and promoting renewable energy. The Kartarpur Corridor, which allowed visa-free access for Indian Sikh pilgrims to Gurdwara Darbar Sahib, was a notable achievement. Environmental sustainability was also prioritized, with programs like the 10 Billion Tree Tsunami. However, Khan's leadership faced significant criticisms, particularly regarding a decline in press freedom in Pakistan, as multiple organizations accused his government of suppressing media outlets. Khan led accountability efforts, led by the National Accountability Bureau (NAB), though they were criticized for being politically motivated and targeting opposition leaders.

Khan's leadership faced substantial challenges during the COVID-19 pandemic in Pakistan. His government initially resisted implementing a nationwide lockdown, instead opting for a "smart lockdown" approach, which faced criticism as infections surged and Pakistan's health system became overwhelmed. To counter the economic impact of the pandemic, Khan's government rolled out a welfare program targeting the country's poorest citizens. Despite the government's efforts, the pandemic contributed to a major economic downturn. However, by late 2020, Pakistan's economy began showing signs of recovery, although issues such as inflation, food security, and national debt remained pressing concerns. Khan's administration also sought international financial support, securing a $6 billion bailout from the IMF. While inflation and slow economic growth persisted for much of his tenure, GDP growth accelerated to 5.97% in his final year in office.

Khan's foreign policy focused on promoting nationalistic and independent stances, particularly on issues like Pakistan's role in the war on terror, the Kashmir dispute with India, and strengthening regional relations, especially with Gulf Cooperation Council states. Khan's government was also vocal on global matters such as Islamophobia and Palestinian statehood. His tenure was marked by a controversial visit to Russia just before the Russian invasion of Ukraine in 2022. Furthermore, Khan's administration worked to meet international standards, particularly by enhancing Pakistan's anti–money laundering laws and addressing issues related to the FATF grey list. By 2021, Pakistan had largely complied with the FATF's requirements.

Khan was ousted on 10 April 2022, becoming the first Pakistani Prime Minister to be removed by a no-confidence vote. Despite Khan's allegations of foreign interference, particularly from the US, the National Security Council found no evidence of a conspiracy. His removal sparked protests, and he later moderated his stance on US relations, seeking to repair ties in November 2022.

== Background ==
Before entering politics, Khan was a cricketer who led Pakistan to its first and only Cricket World Cup victory in 1992. Following his retirement, he turned to philanthropy and founded the Shaukat Khanum Memorial Cancer Hospital, a charitable institution inspired by his mother's battle with cancer. In 1996, Khan launched the Pakistan Tehreek-e-Insaf party. His party did not have much of a success in 1997 Pakistani general election and 2002 Pakistani general election. He boycotted 2008 Pakistani general election. His party emerged as the second largest party by popular vote in the 2013 Pakistani general election. PTI also gained a stronghold in Khyber Pakhtunkhwa, where it formed a government.

== First 100 days ==
In May 2018, Khan's party announced a 100 day agenda for a possible future government. The agenda included reforms in almost all areas of government including creation of a new province in Southern Punjab, fast tracking of merger of Federally Administered Tribal Areas into Khyber Pakhtunkhwa, betterment of law and order situation in Karachi, and betterment of relations with Baloch political leaders. Similar measures were announced in his inaugural speech. In addition to the measures announced in 100 day agenda, Khan announced austerity measures where he vowed to reduce the staff and number of luxury vehicles of prime minister house to two employees and two vehicles respectively from current number of hundreds.

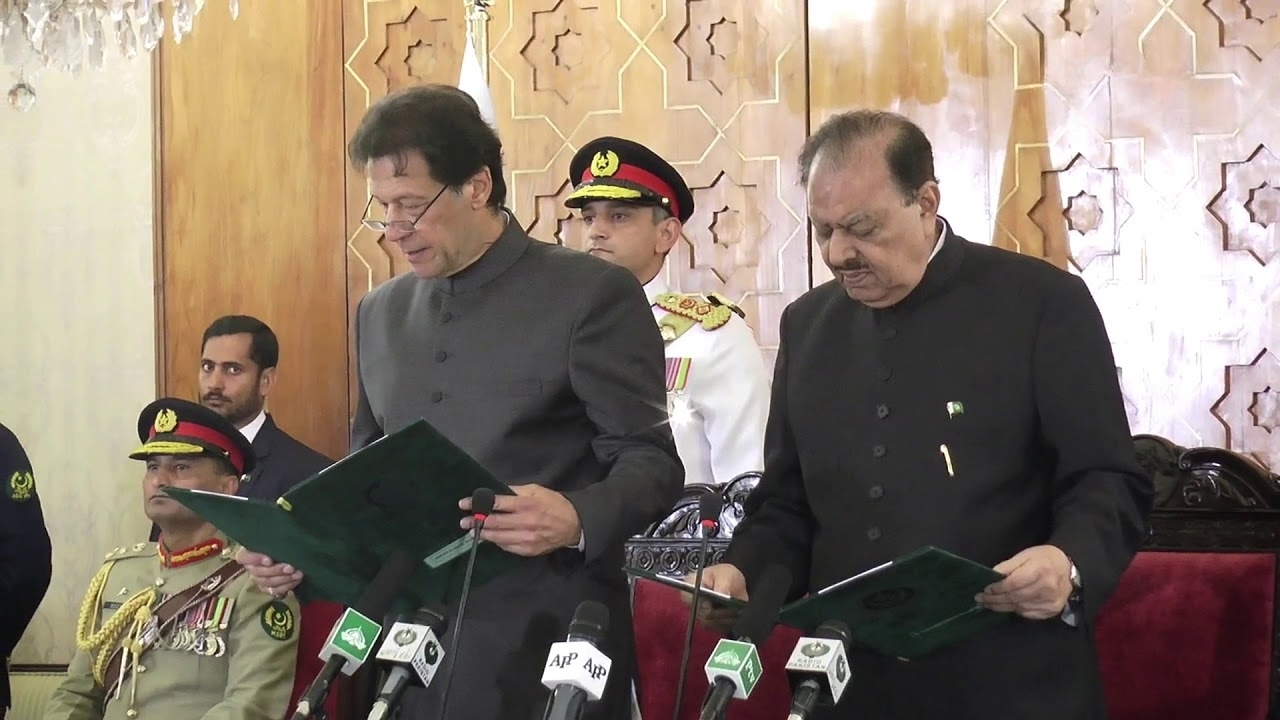
Khan (left) is sworn in as Prime Minister, with President Mamnoon Hussain administering the oath in 2018.

On 17 August 2018, Khan secured 176 votes and became the 22nd Prime Minister of Pakistan and took the oath of office on 18 August 2018. In his celebration speech before swearing in and the inaugural speech after swearing-in he mentioned that he will build and run Pakistan on principles of first Islamic state of Medina. Khan ordered top-level reshuffling in the country's bureaucracy, including the appointment of Sohail Mahmood as Foreign Secretary, Rizwan Ahmed as Maritime Secretary, and Naveed Kamran Baloch as Finance Secretary. His first major appointment in the Pakistan Army was that of Lieutenant General Asim Munir to the key slot of Director-General of Inter-Services Intelligence.

Khan was sworn in as the Prime Minister of Pakistan on 18 August 2018 at the Aiwan-e-Sadr in Islamabad. He initially kept the Ministry of Interior portfolio to himself. However, he later appointed Ijaz Ahmed Shah as interior minister. His cabinet consisted of sixteen ministers and five advisors, with many appointees having served during the Musharraf era, though some were defectors from the left-wing People's Party. In 2019, Khan reshuffled the ministries of interior, finance, information and planning.

After the assassination of Saudi journalist Jamal Khashoggi, Khan stated that Pakistan must prioritise good relations with Saudi Arabia in light of the prevailing economic crisis. He also added that U.S. sanctions against Iran are affecting neighboring Pakistan, stating "The last thing the Muslim World needs is another conflict. The Trump administration is moving towards that direction." Khan prioritised close ties with China, saying he "did not know" much about concentration camps for China's Muslims, though Khan confirmed he had raised the matter "privately" in discussions with China.

== Economy ==
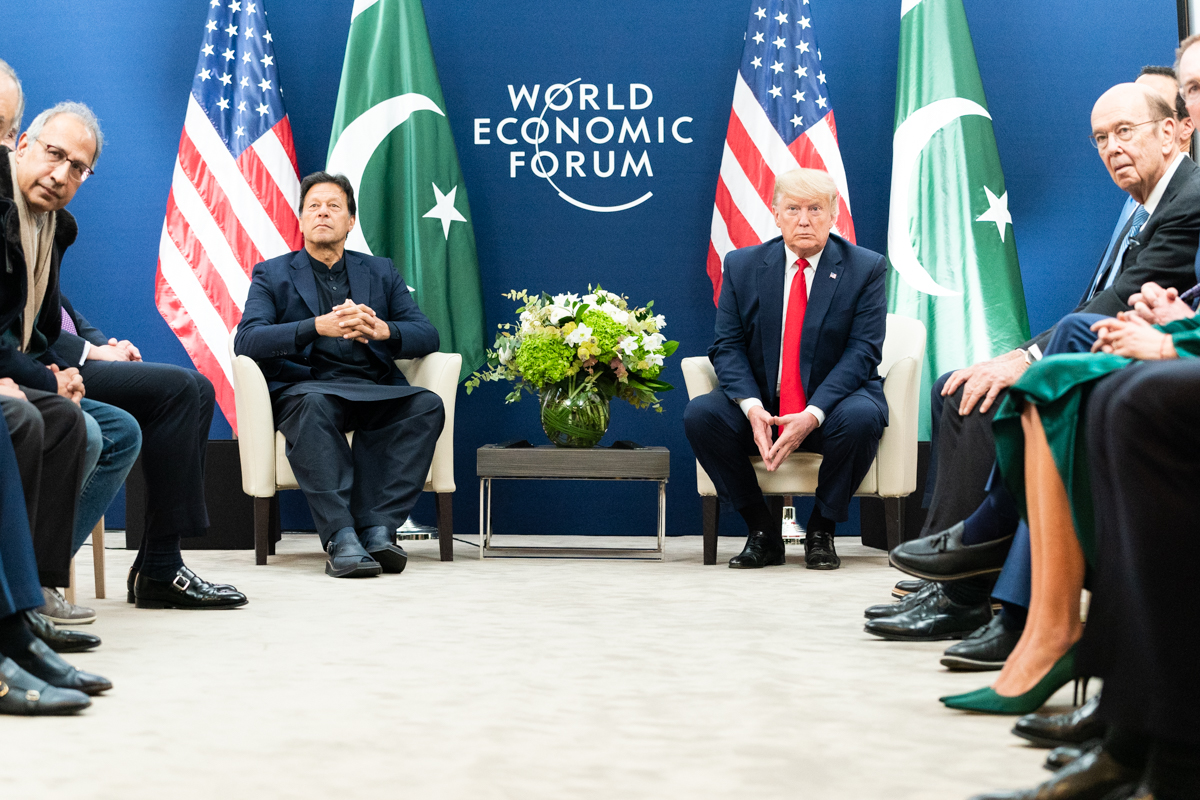
Khan, accompanied by his finance minister Abdul Hafeez Shaikh and other cabinet members, meets US President Donald Trump and his secretary of commerce Wilbur Ross, among others, at the World Economic Forum held in Davos, Switzerland, in 2020

Economy before, during, and after Imran Khan's tenure (IMF data).
Year	GDP (Billion US$ nominal)	GDP per capita (US$ nominal)	GDP growth (Real)	Inflation rate (Percent)	Tenure
2017	▲339.2	▲1,653.4	▲4.6%	▼4.1%	Nawaz Sharif government (Jan–Jul) Abbasi government (Aug–Dec)
2018	▲356.2	▲1,698.0	▲6.1%	▼3.9%	Abbasi government (Jan–May) Imran Khan government (Aug–Dec)
2019	▼321.1	▼1,500.7	▼3.1%	▲6.7%	Imran Khan government
2020	▼300.4	▼1,376.5	▼-0.9%	▲10.7%	Imran Khan government
2021	▲348.5	▲1,565.6	▲5.8%	▼8.9%	Imran Khan government
2022	▲374.7	▲1,650.7	▲6.2%	▲12.1%	Imran Khan government (Jan–Apr) First Shehbaz Sharif government (Apr–Dec)
2023	▼338.2	▼1,460.7	▼-0.2%	▲29.2%	First Shehbaz Sharif government

Khan inherited a twin balance of payments and debt crisis with large current account and fiscal deficits in 2018, as well as public debt of Rs30 trillion. Its servicing compelled the government to take additional loans, including $24 billion for the repayment and servicing of past loans. His government sought to stabilise the economy through austerity measures, structural reforms, and a $6 billion bailout package from the International Monetary Fund (IMF). These measures included slashing subsidies, devaluing the rupee, and setting ambitious tax revenue targets. The Financial Times characterised these measures as a departure from his election promise to establish an Islamic welfare state. Khan's government increased gas and electricity tariffs and imposed new taxes.

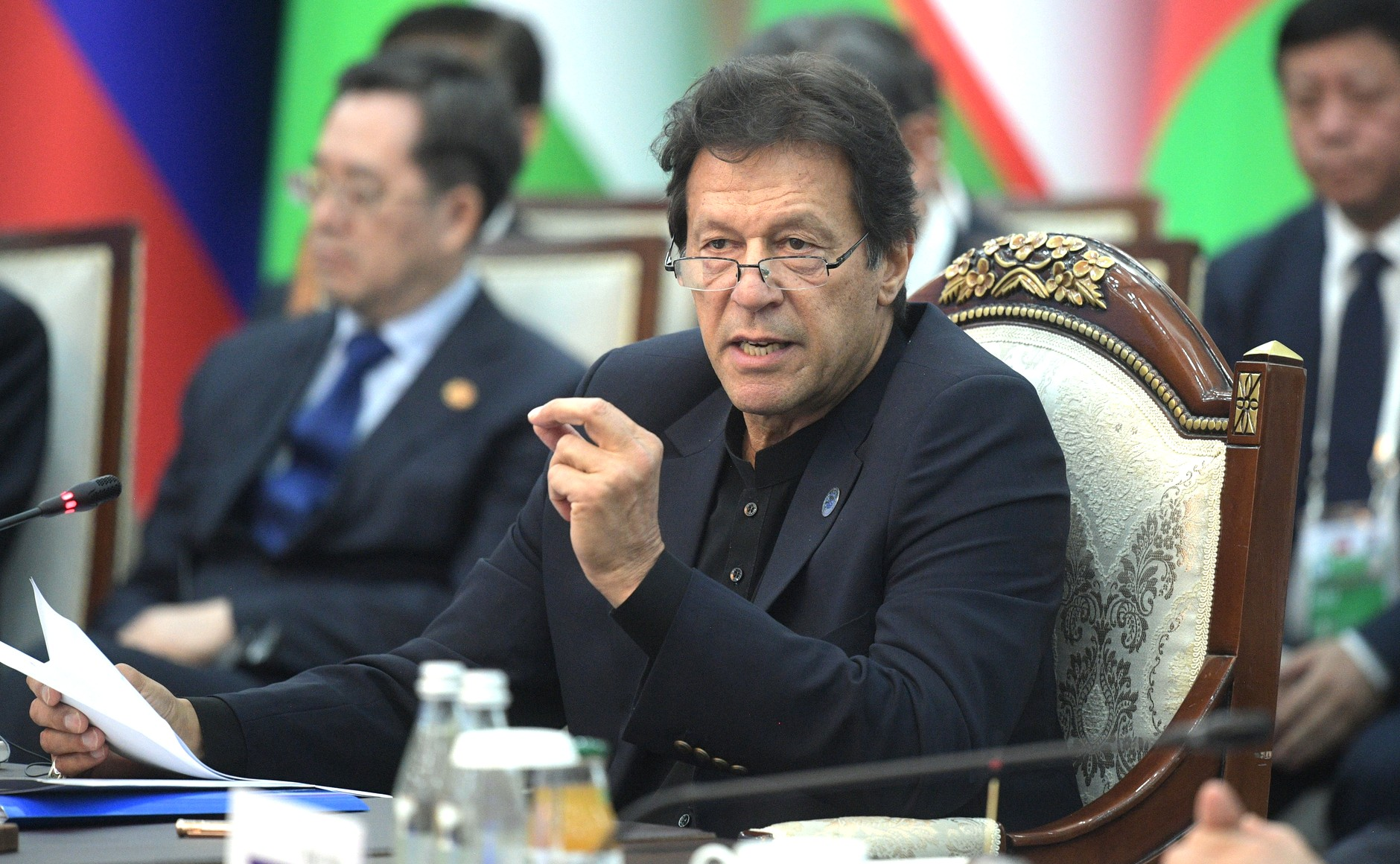
Imran Khan at the Shanghai Cooperation Organisation (SCO) meeting in 2019.

According to the World Bank's Ease of Doing Business 2020 report, released in October 2019, Pakistan implemented six regulatory reforms, improving its ranking from 136 to 108 on the ease of doing business index. This 28-place improvement placed Pakistan among the top 10 most improved countries globally and recognised it as the top reformer in South Asia for enhancing its business environment. However, the report identified areas needing improvement, such as enforcing contracts, where Pakistan ranked 156, and getting credit, where its ranking dropped by seven spots to 119. Additionally, delays in implementing critical reforms by the State Bank of Pakistan and the Ministry of Finance hindered further progress. In 2019, Pakistan's Federal Board of Revenue reported a 17% increase in tax revenue during the first seven months of the fiscal year. In the same year, the country's debt increased by Rs7.7 trillion, of which exchange rate depreciation contributed Rs3.1 trillion. The government increased duties and taxes to cut down the import bill, which, along with record-high remittances, helped narrow the current account deficit to 1.1% of GDP in FY20.

By 2020, Pakistan recorded record-high remittances of $23.1 billion during the fiscal year 2019-2020, driven by factors such as overseas Pakistanis transferring funds they could not send earlier due to COVID-19 restrictions. In January 2020, Khan's government implemented the second phase of the China–Pakistan Free Trade Agreement (FTA-II), which included zero or reduced tariffs on 313 tariff lines for Pakistani exports such as textiles, leather, and surgical instruments. The Federal Board of Revenue collected 10.4% more taxes and duties till April 2020 compared to the previous year. However, in April 2020, the board collected Rs256.6 billion, which was lower than the Rs296.567 billion collected in the same month of the previous year.

In June 2020, Bloomberg reported that Khan saw his "influence and popularity dwindle due to a slowing economy, high consumer prices and corruption investigations involving his close aides." The article also stated that the army's direct influence in civilian government continued to increase as it began "taking a more active role" in policy making, with military officials appointed in government posts.

The budget deficit remained at Rs440 billion, or 0.9% of GDP, during the first two months of FY21, almost 12% lower than the same period of the previous fiscal year. The improvement came largely because of a nearly 70% increase in non-tax revenue, driven by higher petroleum levy rates, while tax revenue grew only 1.8% to Rs587 billion. Exports contracted by 16.6% to $3.4 billion during July–August. Tax collection exceeded the target in the first quarter of FY21, as Pakistan's tax agency, the Federal Board of Revenue (FBR), collected nearly Rs1 trillion, the first time it crossed that level in the first quarter. However, the monthly tax target was missed for the second successive month, income tax collection fell short of its quarterly target, the 4.1% growth rate was insufficient to achieve the annual target, and tax return filings by the statutory deadline were 28% lower than the previous year. Najam Sethi in August 2020 said the CAD had "been curtailed mainly because a stiff devaluation has made consumer and industrial imports prohibitively expensive and led to falling demand, made worse by a falling economy which has plummeted from GDP growth of 5.5% in 2018 to minus 0.4% in 2020. Therefore the reduction of the CAD reflects bad economic policy. It's nothing to boast about." The Express Tribune reported in September 2020 that the government struggled to translate gains into public betterment amid economic challenges like high inflation, stagnant exports, and resource mobilisation.

Pakistan's current account recorded a surplus of $447 million in November 2020, the fifth consecutive month of surplus, compared with a deficit of $326 million during the same period in 2019, according to the State Bank of Pakistan (SBP). The central bank said the current account had been in surplus throughout FY21, in contrast to the previous five years, due to an improved trade balance and a sustained increase in remittances. According to data released by Imran Khan government, information technology (IT) exports grew by 47.4% in fiscal year 2020–21 to $2.12 billion, surpassing $2 billion for the first time and up from $1.44 billion the previous year.

In November 2021, the Financial Times reported that the rupee had dropped 30% in value since Khan's inauguration and that "inflation has surged to the worst level in years, with an index tracking everyday essentials such as fuel, food and soap last week rising above 18 per cent year on year." Inflation reached 12.3% in December 2021, the highest level in nearly two years.

In fiscal year 2021–22, Pakistan's economic growth rate accelerated to 5.97%, higher than the official target of 4.8% and the estimates of the State Bank of Pakistan, International Monetary Fund, World Bank and the Asian Development Bank. The growth rate was the highest in four years and increased Pakistan’s GDP size to $383 billion while per capita income rose to $1,798. The growth was fueled by imports and consumption. In January 2022, Deutsche Welle reported that Pakistan faced significant economic challenges during Khan's government, including tax increases, higher energy prices, rising inflation, and the rupee trading at record lows against the dollar.

A few weeks after Khan's government was overthrown, documents prepared by the Cabinet Division showed that his government had helped recover Rs426 billion over the previous three years through the Assets Recovery Unit (ARU). The unit, established by Khan to repatriate funds from abroad, assisted law enforcement agencies in the recovery process rather than directly recovering assets. According to the Cabinet Division's yearbook, recoveries increased from Rs295.6 billion during the 17-year period from 2000 to 2017. During the PTI's tenure, the ARU and its head, Shahzad Akbar, were criticised by the opposition, which also demanded an audit of the organisation.

After Imran Khan's vote of no-confidence, economist Atif Mian said that Imran Khan "inherited a bad economy but left it in even worse shape." Further saying "[t]here's been zero increase in average income, and Pakistan never got out of the balance of payment (bop) crisis." He criticised the PTI government for "silly schemes" and "the usual short cuts" including "subsidising an elite-favouring rentier economy and going on foreign begging trips".

== Austerity policy ==
Khan announced reductions in the Prime Minister's staff, cutting it from 524 servants to two, and adopted a minimal security detail. His government auctioned off bulletproof vehicles, four helicopters, and eight buffaloes previously acquired for the Prime Minister's office. The initial auction of luxury vehicles fell short of expectations, generating only $600,000 compared to the government's goal of $16 million. The four non-operational UH-1H helicopters, gifted by the U.S. between 1971 and 1993 for rescue efforts, fell into disrepair after years of neglect and were deemed too costly to repair. A Pakistani dealer proposed trading the helicopters for a discount on a new one, but the government rejected it due to laws allowing only cash deals. A BBC report said that Khan was mocked for commuting to work by helicopter to beat traffic jams while advocating austerity measures.

== Environment and energy ==
In July 2018, then Chief Justice of Pakistan, Saqib Nisar, launched a fundraiser for the construction of the Diamer-Bhasha Dam and Mohmand Dam. In September 2018, Khan endorsed Nisar's initiative and urged overseas Pakistanis to contribute through voluntary donations.

"I want to commend Chief Justice Mian Saqib Nisar [for starting the dams fund], but this was not his job," Khan remarked, criticizing past civilian leaders for failing to address the impending water crisis. Taking over the fundraising effort, he called on overseas Pakistanis to contribute. He emphasized that the funds would simultaneously strengthen foreign exchange reserves and finance dam construction, which he pledged to personally oversee."

In June 2020, Khan attended the signing ceremony for the $2.5 billion Kohala Hydropower Project, with a capacity of 1,124 MW. In December 2020, during the Climate Ambition Summit, Khan announced that Pakistan would no longer approve new coal-fired power stations, aligning with the country's efforts to combat climate change. He highlighted the scrapping of two planned coal power projects, which were initially set to produce 2,600 megawatts of energy. The government decided to replace these with hydroelectric projects as part of a broader commitment to renewable energy. Khan also emphasized that by 2030, 60% of Pakistan's energy would come from clean, renewable sources. The World Bank loaned Pakistan $450 million to support the transition to renewable energy resources, focusing on hydropower and solar projects in Khyber Pakhtunkhwa province. The project supports Pakistan’s goal of becoming a low-carbon, renewable energy–reliant economy by 2030 and reducing greenhouse gas emissions to combat climate change.

The government approved the implementation of an electric vehicle (EV) policy, aiming to move vehicles to electric power. The policy initially focused on two- and three-wheel vehicles, as well as buses and trucks, with electric cars to be included at a later stage. As part of its efforts to combat climate change, Pakistan launched the 10 Billion Tree Tsunami Programme, a reforestation initiative aimed at planting over 10 billion trees across the country by scaling up the earlier Billion Tree Tsunami project in Khyber Pakhtunkhwa. Khan initiated the programme on 2 September 2018, with approximately 1.5 million trees expected to be planted on the first day. Most of the work, which paid between 500 and 800 rupees (US$3–5) a day, took place in rural areas, with people setting up nurseries, planting saplings, and serving as forest protection guards. The plan was awarded 7.5 billion rupees ($46m) in funding. In 2020, Khan announced the expansion of national parks under a protected areas initiative. According to an editorial published in The Nation in September 2022, the Auditor General of Pakistan (AGP) discovered over Rs3.49 billion in irregularities during the three-year special audit of the PTI flagship 10-Billion Tree Tsunami Project (BTTP). The irregularities included fake and excessive reporting by the staff, an over-claimed area as verified by GPS measurements resulting in a loss of Rs305.523 million, fictitiously claimed plantation activities in overlapping areas, and uncertified and ungraded seeds obtained from unauthentic sources, causing a loss of Rs109.365 million.

As of November 2023, the dams fund stood at Rs17.86 billion.

== Foreign affairs ==
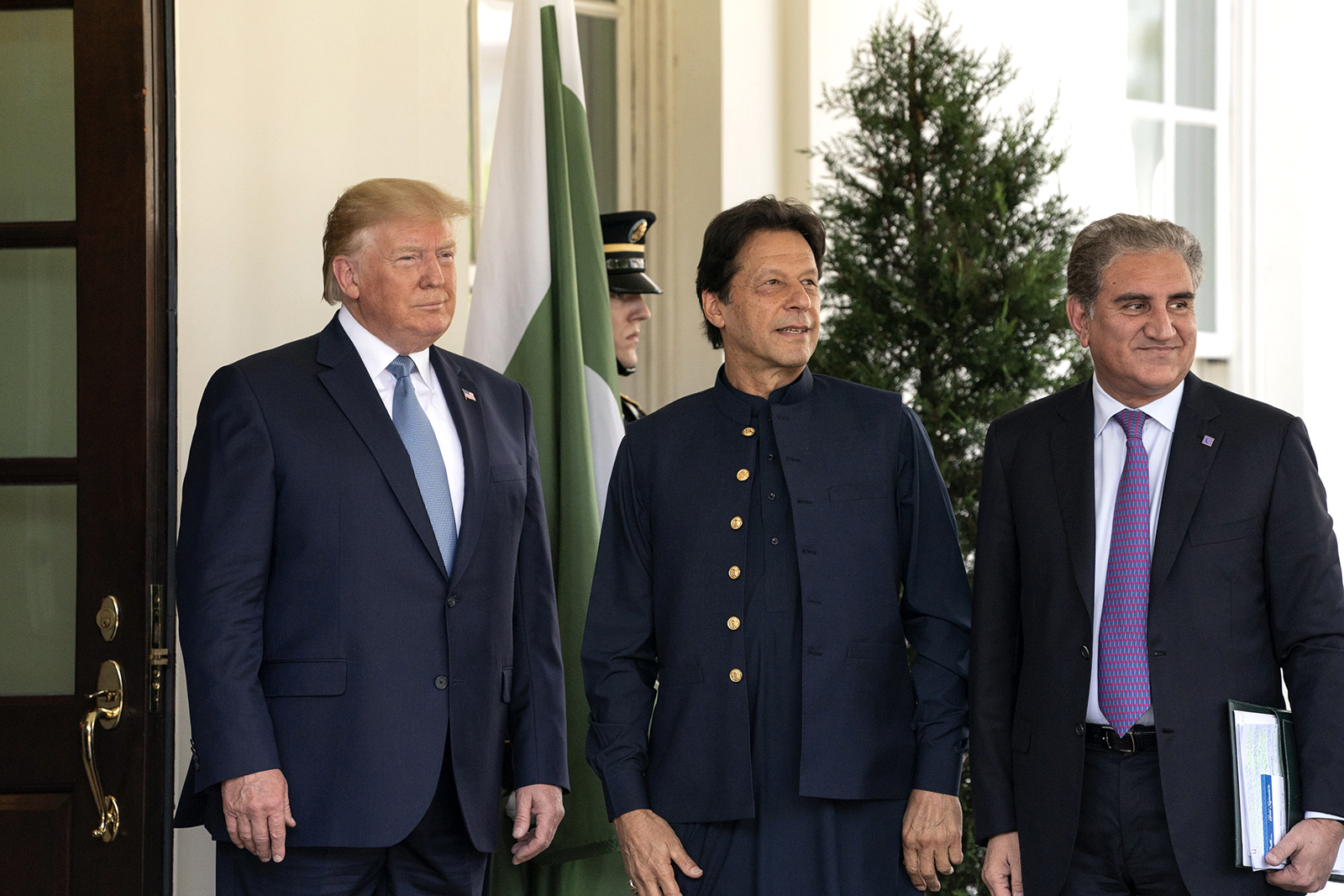
Khan (center) with his foreign minister, Shah Mehmood Qureshi (right) and U.S. President Donald Trump (left) in 2019.

President Donald Trump announced on Twitter his decision to cut off billions in aid to Pakistan in November 2018, berating the country for not doing "a damn thing for us". Imran lashed out at Trump saying that U.S. aid to Pakistan was a "miniscule" $20 billion, while the country lost 75,000 people and more than $123 billion fighting the "US war on terror". He also pointed to the supply routes Pakistan provided to American forces, saying "Can Mr Trump name another ally that gave such sacrifices?" Khan later told the US that Pakistan would no longer act as its "hired gun."

After the 2019 Pulwama attack in Indian-held Kashmir, the Indian government blamed Pakistan for the attack. Khan insisted that Pakistan was not involved and authorised the military to respond decisively and comprehensively to any Indian aggression. On 26 February, the Indian Air Force (IAF) entered Pakistani airspace and conducted the 2019 Balakot airstrike, missing their target. The IAF pilot Abhinandan Varthaman was captured by Pakistan. Khan announced that Abhinandan would be released on 1 March, describing it as a gesture of peace and a first step toward opening negotiations.

Khan maintained a strong stance on the Kashmir issue and after the Revocation of the special status of Jammu and Kashmir by the Indian government in August 2019, he refused talks with India until autonomy was restored. Additionally, Khan's government twice denied Indian prime minister Narendra Modi permission to use Pakistan's airspace, citing alleged human rights violations in Indian-administered Kashmir. However, Modi had been permitted to use Pakistani airspace for a visit to France in August 2019. Pakistan had also refused a similar request from Indian President Ram Nath Kovind during the same period. His speech at the 74th session of the United Nations General Assembly quickly went viral, while in Indian-held Kashmir, Kashmiris celebrated in Srinagar by setting off firecrackers and praising his address.

In September 2019, Khan stated that Trump had asked him to help mediate between Iran and the United States. However, Trump, when asked about Khan's remarks, said that while Khan would like to mediate and they had a good relationship, no meeting between the U.S. and Iran had been agreed upon at that point. In October, he told reporters about Trump's request to "facilitate some sort of dialogue" between the two countries. That same month, Khan also visited both Iran and Saudi Arabia as part of Pakistan's initiative to mediate between the two nations. However, a Saudi official later stated that Riyadh had not requested mediation and that Khan was acting on his own initiative.

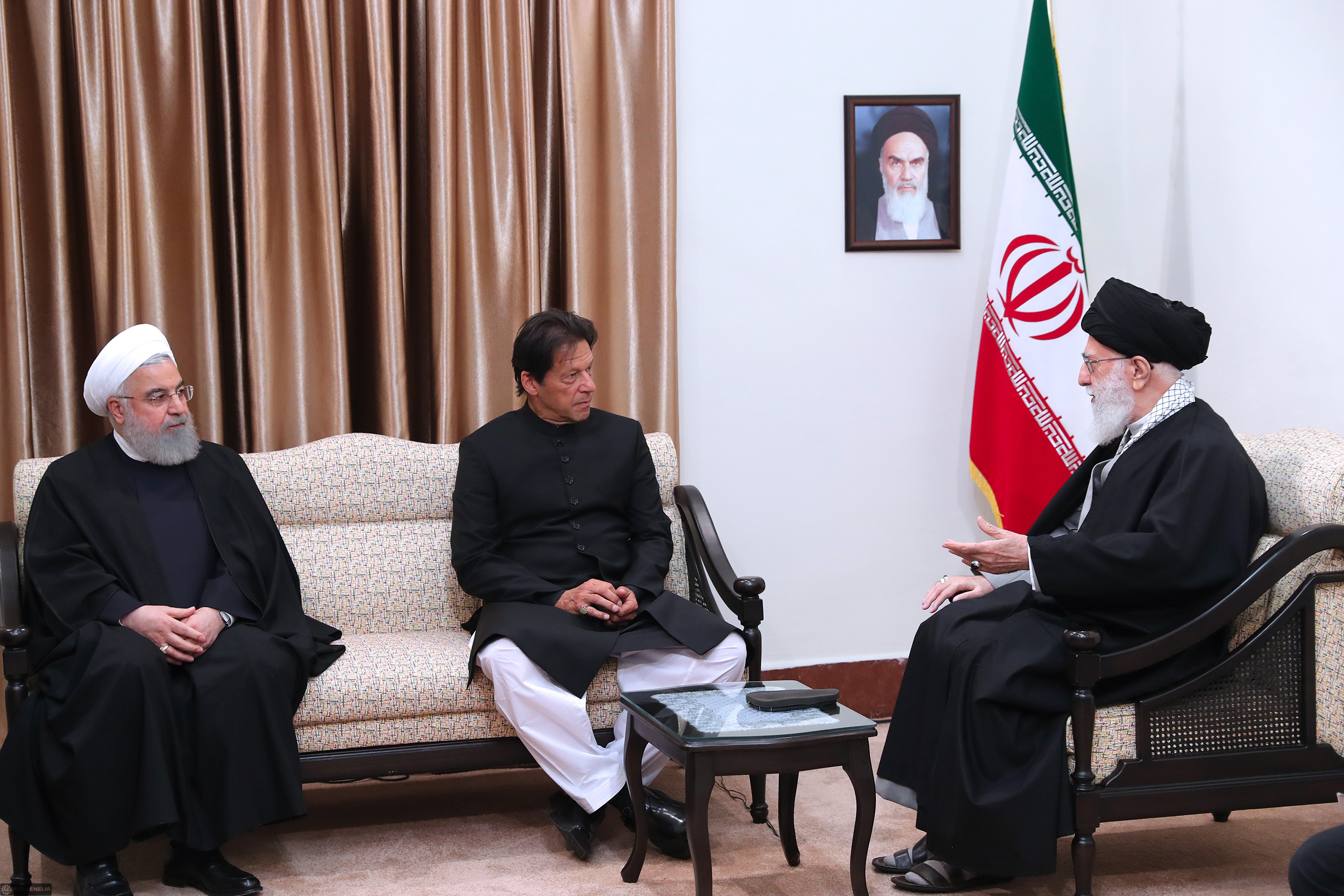
Khan with Ali Khamenei and Hassan Rouhani

Khan voiced support for the 2019 Turkish offensive into north-eastern Syria against the Kurdish-led Syrian Democratic Forces. On 11 October 2019, Khan told the Turkish president Recep Tayyip Erdoğan that "Pakistan fully understands Turkey's concerns relating to terrorism". Khan's foreign policy towards neighbouring Afghanistan consists primarily of support for the Afghan peace process and also inaugurated a 24/7 border crossing with Afghanistan to facilitate travel and trade. He said that Pakistan will never recognize Israel until a Palestinian state is created, a statement in line with the vision of Pakistan's founder Muhammad Ali Jinnah. According to the British newspaper The Independent, Khan's government had improved Pakistan's reputation abroad by stepping into its role as a 'world player'. In 2019, Khan was included in the Time 100, Time's annual list of the 100 most influential people in the world.

External videos
- Pakistan - Prime Minister Addresses General Debate, 74th Session, United Nations, September 29, 2019

While addressing the National Assembly of Pakistan in June 2020, Khan referred to the killing of Osama Bin Laden and said, "I will never forget how we Pakistanis were embarrassed when the Americans came into Abbottabad and killed Osama bin Laden, martyred him." Khan's use of the reverential Arabic term shaheed, a martyr of Islam, was criticised by the opposition. A year later, Khan's foreign minister, Shah Mehmood Qureshi, said that Khan's comments were "taken out of context".

Khan pursued a reset in ties with Gulf Arab states, such as the United Arab Emirates (UAE) and Saudi Arabia, with the UAE agreeing to roll over Pakistan's debt on an interest-free loan. Subsequently, Khan embarked on a three-day visit to the Kingdom of Saudi Arabia in order to reset ties, where he was personally received at the airport by Mohammad bin Salman. The ties had become tense previously due to the unwillingness of Pakistan to contribute militarily to the Saudi Arabian–led intervention in Yemen. Saudi Arabia's ambassador to Pakistan confirmed that the Saudi government had approved a concessionary loan for building a hydroelectric dam, the Mohmand dam. Khan's government also improved ties with the Gulf state of Kuwait, as Kuwait confirmed it had lifted a ten-year visa ban on Pakistani nationals. Khan's government enhanced economic ties with Qatar which is expected to benefit Pakistan by US$3 billion over 10 years by renegotiating terms in an energy supply deal which saw a significant reduction in Pakistan's energy import bill compared to the previous deal. Khan, along with his foreign minister, Shah Mehmood Qureshi, worked to strengthen relations with Saudi Arabia. However, Khan also sought to mediate in the Iran–Saudi Arabia proxy conflict, including efforts to end the war in Yemen.

On the international stage he emphasised Islamic unity through his efforts against Islamophobia and leadership in the Organisation of Islamic Cooperation (OIC). On 9 May 2021, Khan condemned the Israeli police actions at Al-Aqsa, stating that such actions violated "all norms of humanity and [international] law". In his speech to the National Assembly of Pakistan in June 2021, Khan criticised the American drone campaign in Pakistan under his predecessors, questioning whether England would allow Pakistan to conduct drone strikes on Altaf Hussain, who has been living there in exile since 1990. Also, Khan has been vocal on the Kashmir issue, and his government adopted the foreign policy stance that no talks will be held with India on the Kashmir dispute until autonomy was restored in Indian-held Kashmir. Khan's national security adviser Moeed Yusuf confirmed that backdoor contacts with India, ostensibly brokered by the UAE, had broken down after India had refused to restore the region's autonomy.

In August 2021, Khan celebrated the departure of the United States from Afghanistan, describing it as Afghans breaking "the shackles of slavery". Shortly after the 2021 Fall of Kabul, Khan remarked that the Taliban-led government in Afghanistan should be recognised sooner or later by the United States and not isolated. Khan faced criticism for certain comments and policies including his stance on the Taliban.

=== Comments on Pashtuns and the Taliban ===
In his virtual address at the 76th Session of the United Nations General Assembly on 24 September 2021, Khan remarked "Then all along the tribal belt bordering Afghanistan – the Pakistan's semi-autonomous tribal belt – where no Pakistan army had been there since our independence, they [the Pashtuns] had strong sympathies with the Afghan Taliban, not because of their religious ideology but because of Pashtun nationalism, which is very strong." His comments prompted outrage among many Pashtuns, who called on him to apologise. Khan made similar comments also on 11 October, which triggered a protest in Peshawar the next day by the leftist Mazdoor Kisan Party (MKP). The Awami National Party (ANP) and the Pashtun Tahafuz Movement (PTM) also condemned Khan for "linking the Pashtuns with terrorists."

During his keynote address at the Organisation of Islamic Cooperation's (OIC) Extraordinary Session of Foreign Ministers on 19 December 2021, which was held in Islamabad to discuss the humanitarian situation in Afghanistan. Khan said "the idea of human rights is different in every society," giving the example of Khyber Pakhtunkhwa province which borders Afghanistan. He added, "the city culture is completely different from the culture in rural areas [...] we give stipends to the parents of the girls so that they send them to school. But in districts bordering Afghanistan, if we are not sensitive to the cultural norms, then they won't send them to school despite receiving double the amount. We have to be sensitive about human rights and women rights." His remarks were criticised by many people from Afghanistan and Pakistan, including former Afghan president Hamid Karzai. Nobel laureate Malala Yousafzai also slammed Khan's remarks, saying: "I nearly lost my life fighting against the Taliban's ban on girls' education."

=== Russia ===
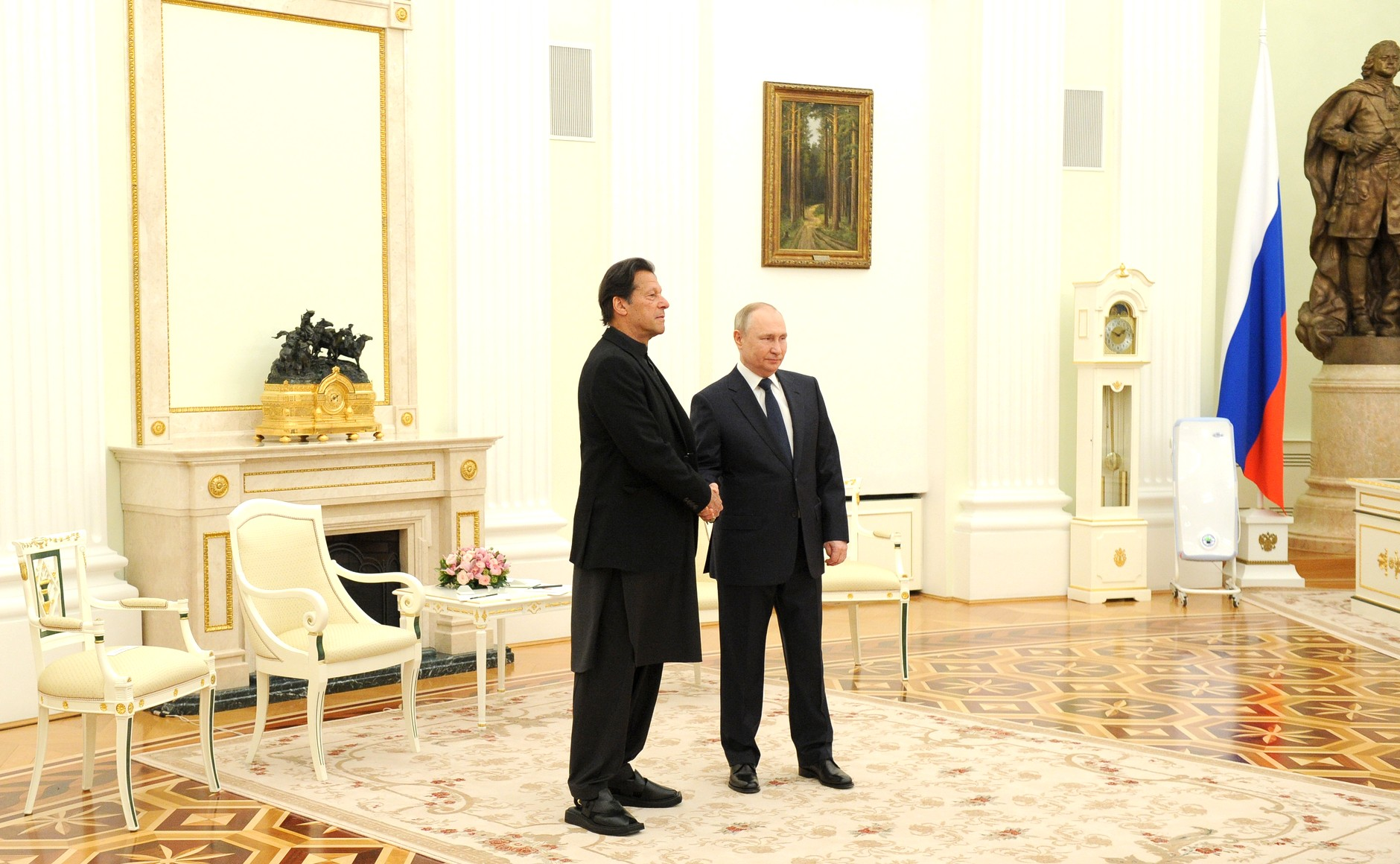
Khan met with Russian President Vladimir Putin in Moscow just hours after Russia's invasion of Ukraine began.

On 23 February 2022, Imran Khan became the first Pakistani prime minister in 20 years to visit Moscow, in a trip described as an opportunity to discuss economic cooperation and Pakistan's energy needs. Upon his arrival, Khan was heard in a video clip telling officials, "What a time I have come... so much excitement," a statement that later appeared ill-timed as the visit coincided with the beginning of the Russian invasion of Ukraine. The US government had already reacted negatively to the trip before the invasion began, with State Department spokesperson Ned Price stating that every "responsible" country had a duty to voice objection to Vladimir Putin's actions.

Radio Pakistan reported the two discussed "economic and energy cooperation", namely a several billion dollar Pakistan Stream Gas Pipeline project, which Russian enterprises partnered in developing southward from Karachi to Punjab.

The pipeline, which was begun in 2020, is the result of a 2015 agreement for a 1,100 km pipeline with a designed capacity ranging from 12.4 to 16 billion cubic meters, with Russia financing 26% of costs, which ranged from US$1.5–3.5 billion. It was expected that, even under sanctions against Russia, Pakistan could still import up to 14 billion cubic meters of liquid natural gas (LNG) from the vast Russian reserves to the "energy-starved power plants" in Pakistan. The Eurasian Pipeline Consortium and pipeline supplier TMK were tasked with the completion of the pipeline.

Of the timing on the talks, Khan explained that he was invited by Putin months in advance and that he was not interested in joining any "blocs", and welcomed neutrality in hopes of "peace and harmony within and among societies." During the UN General Assembly emergency meeting on the invasion he expressed regret for the situation while abstaining on a resolution condemning Russia's invasion of Ukraine, and called for de-escalation with adherence to international law as laid out in the UN Charter. On 6 March, Khan addressed a political rally where he criticised the heads of 22 diplomatic missions who had released a letter urging Pakistan to support the UN resolution.

After Khan's government was ousted, he claimed in a political rally that his visit to Russia involved discussions about securing discounted oil and wheat for Pakistan. He stated that Russia had agreed to provide oil at a 30% discount and wheat at a 20% discount. Russian Ambassador to Pakistan Danila Ganich refuted this claim on 13 June 2022, stating that no formal agreements or memorandums of understanding (MoUs) were established between Russia and Pakistan regarding discounted oil and wheat. He further remarked that Khan's visit to Moscow might have been one of the factors contributing to his removal from power, and added that Khan acted 'as a man' by refusing to call off the visit to Russia.

== Press freedom ==
In 2019, the Human Rights Watch (HRW) in its World Report stated that the government continued to "muzzle dissenting voices in nongovernmental organizations (NGOs) and media on the pretext of national security." Media outlets were pressured by authorities to avoid reporting on several issues, including criticism of government institutions. In some cases, government regulatory agencies blocked cable operators from broadcasting networks that had aired critical programs. In April 2019, Reporters Without Borders (RSF) "condemn[ed]" directives of the Interior Ministry and Federal Investigation Agency (FIA) to investigate journalists who posted images of murdered Saudi journalist Jamal Khashoggi. Earlier, the interior ministry claimed there was a "targeted social media campaign planned/executed" during the visit of the Crown Prince Mohammed bin Salman and ordered an inquiry into online criticism after a similar probe proposal had been "thwarted" 20-days before by the government.

In June 2021, the World Association of Newspapers (WAN-IFRA), International Publishers Association (IPA) and International Federation of Journalists (IFJ) called on the government to retract proposals to establish the Pakistan Media Development Authority (PMDA) which would centralise all media regulation into a single body. The three groups criticised the proposal and said they were "particularly alarmed" by provisions providing for Media Tribunals that would be "vested with the power to hand down punishments of up to three years in jail and fines of up to 25 million Pakistani rupees."

In December 2021, the International Press Institute (IPI) said "the government has shown increasing intolerance to critical journalism" and "[t]he armed forces have also played a key role in stifling press freedom in the country. Cases of abduction, physical attacks, and torture of journalists have become commonplace." IPI also criticised the disruption of newspaper circulation and the "tactics" of the Pakistan Electronic Media Regulatory Authority (PEMRA) "to limit independent news coverage by cable operators news channels." In an open letter to Prime Minister Imran Khan, IPI "expressed grave concerns" over a proposed ordinance to establish the PDMA.

The Pakistan Press Foundation's (PPF) Press Freedom in Pakistan 2021-22 report documented 2 abductions, 41 assaults, 13 arrests, 23 threats, and 7 legal actions against media professionals, along with raids on journalists' homes and press clubs. The report stated that Khan, as prime minister, publicly referred to journalists as "mafias" and "blackmailers" on multiple occasions, without providing evidence to substantiate these claims. It criticized online censorship, the FIA's overreach, PEMRA's blanket bans, and government rhetoric but commended the "Protection of Journalists and Media Professionals Bill, 2021" as a "significant first step."

In August 2022, the International Federation of Journalists (IFJ) shared a report originally published by Naya Daur, detailing threats and targeting of journalists during Khan's tenure.

Imran Khan denied persecuting journalists during his premiership. In a 2023 interview with Vice, he stated, "[w]hat happened was that there were army laws. So the journalist who got into trouble said something to the army. So under some security law, action was taken against them." He claimed only two journalists were abducted under his government—one being Matiullah Jan—and both were promptly released after he found out. Khan asserted that his administration never initiated cases against the media and said, "[c]ompare that to what's going on now. A journalist was killed," referring to Arshad Sharif.

== Social policy ==
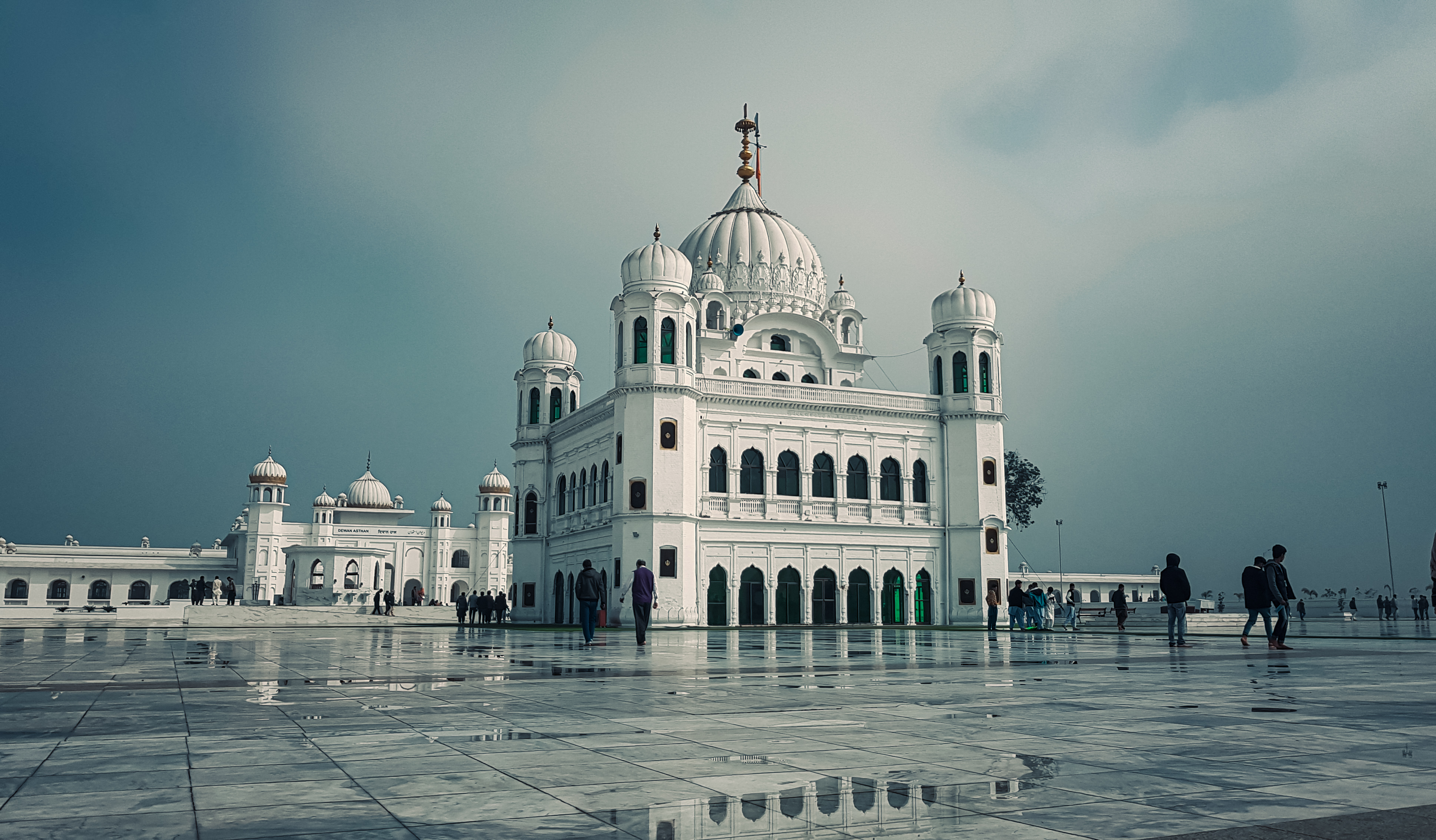
Gurdwara Darbar Sahib renovated by Khan's government

Khan's government supported the restoration of religious sites for minorities. In Quetta, a 200-year-old Gurdwara, previously used as a school for Muslim girls, was returned to the Sikh community after a legal battle, allowing worship for the first time in 73 years. Additionally, the government backed the construction and renovation of Sikh shrines, including the Gurdwara Darbar Sahib. The Kartarpur Corridor was formally inaugurated on 9 November 2019 by Khan. This initiative provided visa-free access for Indian Sikh pilgrims to the Gurdwara Darbar Sahib. Khan's government and the opposition parties had differing views on the Kartarpur Corridor. The Pakistan Peoples Party (PPP) fully supported the initiative, highlighting its significance for Sikh pilgrims. Conversely, the Pakistan Muslim League (N) (PML (N)) expressed concerns about unilateral peace initiatives with India, citing past negative responses. PML (N) argued that such decisions, particularly the Kartarpur Corridor, did not result in productive outcomes, especially considering India's actions regarding Kashmir.

During his tenure, Khan's government implemented reforms in education and healthcare. One of the key initiatives was the introduction of the Single National Curriculum (SNC), aimed at standardising the education system across Pakistan. The project initially targeted classes 1 to 5, with subsequent phases planned for classes 6 to 12. The initiative sought to eliminate disparities between different educational streams and promote a cohesive national identity. On the healthcare front, the Sehat Sahulat Program was launched by the government with the claim of providing free medical care to millions, particularly in Punjab. According to government statements, over 7 million families were to receive coverage under the program.

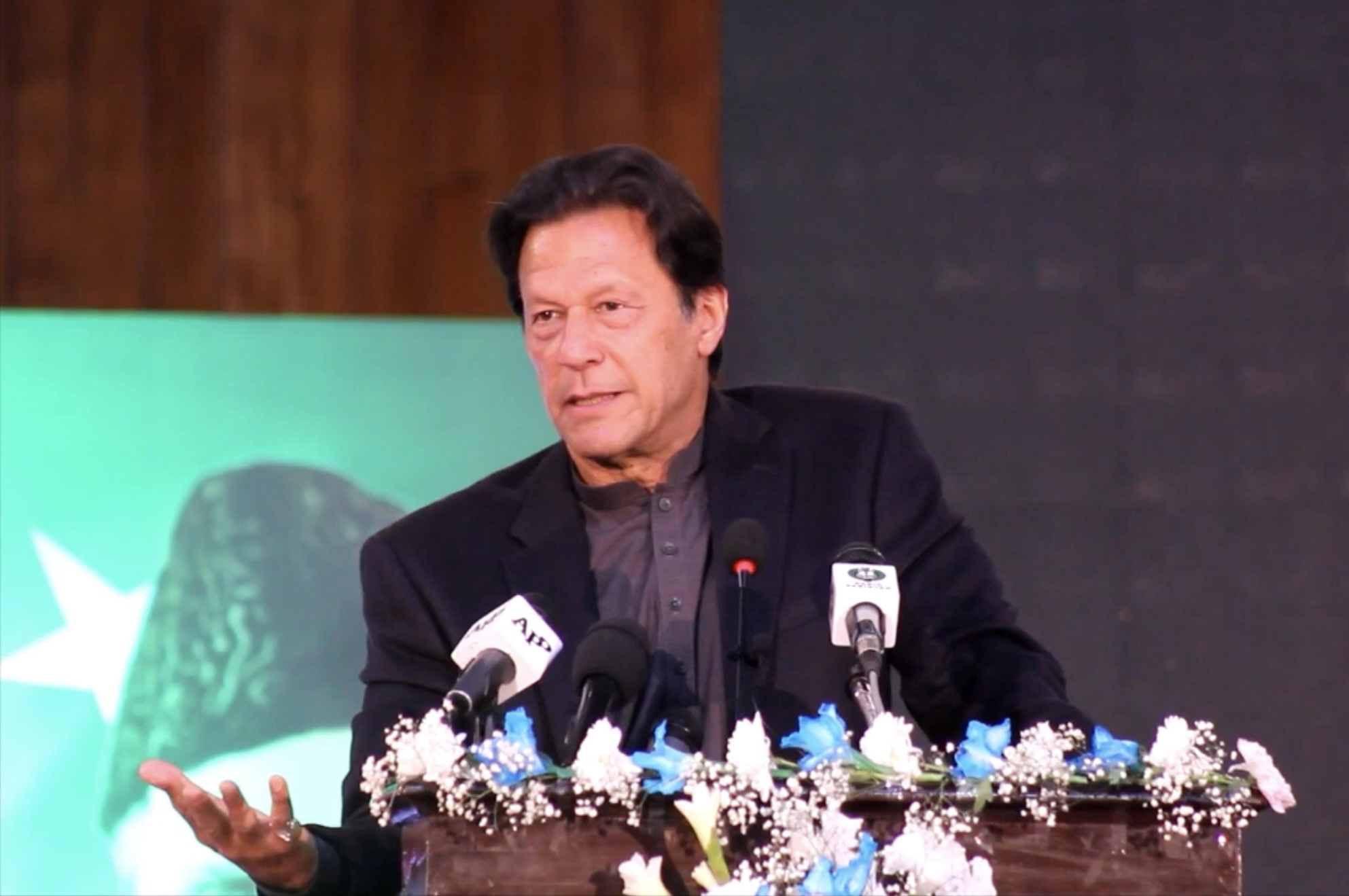
Khan launches the Ehsaas Kafalat Program, January 2020

Khan's government introduced reforms to Pakistan's social safety net, including the Ehsaas Programme. In July 2020, Special Assistant to the Prime Minister, Sania Nishtar claimed that the Ehsaas Emergency Cash Programme had successfully disbursed cash to protect the poor and daily wage earners in Pakistan who were adversely affected by the COVID-19 lockdowns. According to government statements, the Ehsaas Kafaalat Policy for Special Persons was launched to assist two million families with a monthly stipend of Rs. 2000. Additionally, claims by Khan and Nishtar, stated that the Ehsaas Emergency Cash Program, aimed at assisting families during the COVID-19 pandemic, reached 14.6 million beneficiaries, with Rs. 175 billion disbursed. Khan's government also introduced the Sehat Sahulat Programme, aimed at providing health insurance to Khyber Pakhtunkhwa residents. According to government claims, the programme covered all residents, offering up to Rs. 1 million in annual health coverage. In May 2021, the government reported that over 100 million people benefited from various forms of assistance under the Ehsaas Programme. This included cash transfers, emergency relief, and welfare initiatives such as education stipends, conditional cash transfers, healthcare programmes, and interest-free loans. In a report by Delivery Associates, published in December 2020, Michael Barber described Ehsaas as a success and referred to it as Khan's flagship initiative. The report highlighted Ehsaas as a transparent, results-driven, and multi-sectoral programme, laying the foundation for becoming a global model for poverty alleviation. It praised achievements such as governance reforms, technology-driven transparency, and impactful initiatives like Ehsaas Kafaalat and Ehsaas Nashonuma. In December 2020, the World Bank also commended the Ehsaas Programme, describing it as a "flagship programme of social protection" and a "role model for other countries."

In 2020, following national outrage over the September assault of a woman who was dragged from her car and raped at gunpoint in front of her children, Khan called for public hanging and chemical castration of convicted rapists. In response, his government introduced an anti-rape law aimed at ensuring swift convictions and strict penalties, including the death sentence for perpetrators. The legislation mandated the establishment of special courts across Pakistan to hear rape cases in secrecy and issue verdicts "expeditiously, preferably within four months." However, the clause for chemical castration of serial rapists was later removed after the Council of Islamic Ideology deemed it un-Islamic. "The Islamic Council of Ideology had objected to the punishment of chemical castration for rapists for being an un-Islamic practice, so we decided to remove it from the law," parliamentary secretary on law Maleeka Bokhari told reporters.

In 2021, Khan was criticised after suggesting that women's clothing could lead to an increase in sexual assault. During an interview, Khan responded to a question about Pakistan's rape crisis by saying, "If a woman is wearing very few clothes it will have an impact on the man unless they are robots. It's common sense." His comments were widely condemned. Women's rights groups, including the Human Rights Commission of Pakistan, demanded an apology, saying that his remarks perpetuate harmful stereotypes by portraying men as "helpless aggressors" and women as "knowing" victims.

Khan later said in another interview, "Anyone who commits rape, solely and solely, that person is responsible, no matter whatever – how much ever a woman is provocative or whatever she wears, the person who commits rape, he is fully responsible. Never is the victim responsible." Regarding his earlier remarks on the issue, Khan stated that his comments had been "completely taken out of context." He added that he would never say such "a stupid thing, it's always the rapist that is responsible."

== Security and anti-terrorism ==
During Khan's government, there was progress in security, evidenced by a 13% decrease in terrorist attacks in 2019 compared to the previous year. Despite this improvement, there were notable challenges in certain regions such as Balochistan and Khyber Pakhtunkhwa, as well as concerns over terrorism financing and insurgency. On 5 March 2019, the Khan government formally banned the Hafiz Saeed-led Jamaat-ud-Dawa and its affiliate Falah-e-Insaniat Foundation under the Anti Terrorism Act 1997. In the same year, Pakistan arrested Hafiz Saeed. In 2020, foreign investors expressed greater confidence in the improving security situation in Pakistan.

On 25 June 2020, Khan came under criticism, both in the international press and from the domestic opposition, for calling al-Qaeda founder and 9/11 mastermind Osama bin Laden a martyr. On a previous occasion during a local television interview, he had refused to call bin Laden a terrorist.

In July 2021, the Project Pegasus revealed a spyware surveillance list that included at least one phone number associated with Khan. There was no confirmation that this phone number was targeted with spyware or that any hacking attempt was made or successful. The list merely identified the number as one of the potential targets.

== Public sector ==
Pakistan's public sector consisted of state-owned enterprises that had been struggling with financial difficulties for decades, including national services such as Pakistan Railways, Pakistan International Airlines (PIA), Pakistan Post, and other state-owned companies such as Pakistan Steel Mills (PSM). In 2019, PIA reported breakeven at the operational level for the first time in years. However, it was noted that it would still take three to four years for PIA to report a net profit. Khan's government introduced specific measures aimed at addressing inefficiencies within the public sector, including the implementation of the golden handshake scheme for PSM employees. This scheme was part of efforts to reduce the financial burden on the government and streamline operations within state-owned entities. While the golden handshake scheme was introduced as a measure to reduce the financial burden on the government, it has also faced criticism for its potential social impact on thousands of employees who may be laid off.

In 2020, the PIA implemented a comprehensive restructuring plan aimed at addressing its financial difficulties. This plan included reducing the workforce from 12,900 to 7,500 in the first phase, with further reductions planned for 2021. The restructuring also involved dividing the airline's departments into core and non-core activities and adding 16 new aircraft to the fleet by 2022, increasing the total number of planes to 45. At the time, PIA's total assets were worth Rs107 billion, while its liabilities amounted to Rs470 billion. To address these financial challenges, the government formed a four-member committee, led by Adviser to the Prime Minister Dr Ishrat Husain, to oversee the implementation of the restructuring plan. A Rs12.87 billion Voluntary Separation Scheme (VSS) was also introduced to lay off over 3,800 employees, expected to save Rs4.2 billion annually and recover its cost within two-and-a-half years.

== Accountability ==
In June 2019, Khan removed General Asim Munir from his position as Director-General of the Inter-Services Intelligence (ISI) and replaced him with General Faiz Hameed. The Daily Telegraph alleged that Munir's removal followed Munir telling Khan that he wanted to investigate corruption allegations against Khan's wife, Bushra Bibi, and her inner circle. Khan said Munir did not show him any proof of Bibi's corruption and he did not ask Munir to resign because of his request to investigate.

Khan's government began an anti-corruption drive, promoting efforts to tackle corruption among Pakistan's political elite. However, the campaign faced criticism for its impact on the economy, with some arguing that it led to delays in vital projects due to bureaucrats' fear of being implicated in investigations. Additionally, there was accusations that the campaign disproportionately targeted the political opposition, raising concerns about its fairness and impartiality. The campaign faced criticism, particularly from the Pakistan People's Party (PPP), which claimed that National Accountability Bureau (NAB) was being used to target political opponents and critics of the government. International organisations, including the European Union and Human Rights Watch, also raised concerns about NAB's impartiality, alleging that it was used as a tool for political blackmailing and victimisation. In December 2020, Shibli Faraz, the information minister in Khan's government, announced that Pakistan had initiated legal proceedings to extradite Nawaz Sharif, who had been convicted of corruption in the Panama Papers case. Khan said he wanted Sharif returned to Pakistan to face trial.

The NAB Lahore chapter reported a 286% annual increase in the recovery amounts involved in references during the period from 2018 to 2020, compared to the period from 1999 to 2016. By the end of 2020, NAB Lahore had authorised 26 investigations and filed 38 references in accountability courts, while closing seven investigations due to a lack of evidence. The NAB reported a total recovery of Rs 487 billion over three years, from 2018 to 2020. According to Khan, NAB's total recoveries of Rs. 389 billion in 2019 and 2020 far exceeded the Rs. 104 billion recovered during the entire 10-year period before 2018.

Once closely allied with billionaire sugar baron Jahangir Tareen, Khan's relationship with him eventually soured amid the 2020 sugar scandal. Initially, Khan had defended Tareen even when he faced allegations, including being barred from holding public office by the country's top court in 2018. However, with growing concerns over the sugar scandal, Khan pushed for an investigation into the case, where Tareen was accused of benefiting from government subsidies and profiting from rising sugar prices. Tareen has denied the accusations, calling them "totally fabricated" and politically motivated. The rift between the two also seems to have been influenced by other factors, such as their differing views on the IMF bailout and other internal struggles within the PTI. Khan's eventual push for a probe came after mounting pressure. This led to a fallout, with Tareen going into self-imposed exile in London.

The inquiry into the sugar crisis, led by the Federal Investigation Agency (FIA), revealed that two major groups benefited significantly from the crisis. One group, JWD, owned by Tareen, received 12.28% of the total export subsidy from 2015 to 2018, while the RYK group, which included relatives of key political figures such as Khusro Bakhtiar and Moonis Elahi, received 15.83% of the export subsidy over the same period. These subsidies were granted despite concerns that the export of sugar was not justified, as sugarcane production was expected to be low in 2018-19, and the export led to an increase in local prices. The report highlighted that the price of sugar rose from Rs55 per kg in December 2018 to Rs71.44 in June 2019, largely attributed to the export of sugar in early 2019. The report also pointed out the failure of the Sugar Advisory Board to take timely action on the export ban, which may have exacerbated the crisis. Additionally, while the report focused on the involvement of these groups in benefiting from subsidies, it also highlighted the role of Buzdar provincial government in contributing to the crisis noting that only the provincial government of Punjab provided the subsidy, which amounted to Rs3 billion. Dawn cited a source claiming that the prime minister and inquiry commission members were threatened with dire consequences if the findings were disclosed to the public. The report revealed how the sugar cartel exploited farmers, manipulated production and sales, and engaged in practices that led to billions in profits from subsidies and market manipulation. While public scrutiny over the sugar scam was a major factor in Khan distancing himself from Tareen, the dynamics within PTI, including power struggles over policy matters like the IMF bailout, also contributed to the breakdown of their relationship. These internal rivalries played a role in Tareen's eventual exclusion from Khan's inner circle, suggesting that his removal was influenced by a combination of scandal and political maneuvering within the party.

In 2021, the leaked documents Pandora Papers revealed that several key figures within his government secretly owned offshore companies and moved millions of dollars abroad. Among them were Finance Minister Shaukat Tarin and his family and the son of former Finance Adviser Waqar Masood Khan. Additionally, key ally Moonis Elahi was implicated in attempts to conceal proceeds from an allegedly corrupt business deal, while top PTI donor Arif Naqvi faced fraud charges in the U.S. Khan maintained that any wrongdoing by his ministers was their "individual act" and not reflective of his government. Regarding the owner of two offshore companies registered at an address similar to that of Khan, he explained that two houses in the same neighbourhood share an address. He denied any connection to the companies, clarifying that their owner might have attended an extended family function.

Despite Khan's promises to curb corruption in Pakistan, the nation's rankings in the Corruption Perceptions Index produced by Transparency International declined during his administration. Pakistan fell from 117th in 2018 to 140th in 2021. Amber Shamsi said that dozens of opposition figures had been accused of corruption and jailed without being prosecuted. In response to the CPI report, Information Minister Fawad Chaudhry said Pakistan "need[s] reforms in the areas of the rule of law and state capture as mentioned in the report." Critics have questioned the effectiveness and impartiality of Khan's anti-corruption policies.

A few weeks after Khan's government was overthrown, the new administration disclosed documents revealing that Rs426.4 billion had been recovered over the past three years with the assistance of the Assets Recovery Unit (ARU). This unit, established by Khan in September 2018, aimed to provide a platform for law enforcement agencies such as the NAB, Federal Investigation Agency (FIA), and the Federal Board of Revenue (FBR) to trace and recover unlawfully acquired assets, eventually repatriating them to Pakistan. According to the Cabinet Division's yearbook for 2020-21, this marked a significant increase compared to the Rs295.6 billion recovered during the 17-year period from 2000 to 2017. While the ARU itself did not directly recover assets, it played a facilitative role in assisting these agencies in recoveries. The majority of recoveries—Rs389.5 billion—were made by NAB under the ARU's supervision and assistance, while the FIA recovered Rs6.4 billion, and the FBR recovered Rs5.6 billion in FY21 from taxes on offshore assets. Additionally, Rs30 billion was directly attributed to the ARU's efforts. Despite these recoveries, the ARU faced criticism throughout Khan's tenure from the then-opposition, which demanded an audit of the unit and accused it of failing to recover looted national wealth. The resignation of its initial head, Shahzad Akbar, in January 2022 was reportedly due to dissatisfaction with his performance.

== Locust infestation response ==
Between 2019 and 2022, a significant desert locust outbreak emerged, threatening food security in East Africa, the Arabian Peninsula, and the Indian subcontinent. In June 2019, locust swarms entered Pakistan from neighboring Iran, quickly devastating large areas of agricultural land in southwestern districts, ravaging crops such as cotton, wheat, and maize. The damage caused Pakistan to miss its wheat production target by approximately 2 million tonnes, forcing the government to import grain for the first time in nearly a decade. China provided substantial assistance, including drones, pesticides, and technical expertise, to help Pakistan manage the crisis.

On 1 February 2020, Pakistan declared a nationwide emergency to address the desert locust threat, describing it as the "worst locust infestation in more than two decades." The government took actions, including aerial spraying over vast areas, and various agencies such as the armed forces and voluntary organizations were mobilized to combat the threat. However, the locust outbreak was exacerbated by a delayed response, which allowed the locusts to breed and spread more rapidly. By October 2020, the Food and Agriculture Organization (FAO) of the United Nations announced that Pakistan had successfully brought the locust crisis under control and commended the country's extensive control efforts as "ideal."

== Stance regarding Islamophobia ==
While addressing the Seventy-fifth session of the United Nations General Assembly in 2020, Prime Minister Imran Khan suggested an international day to combat Islamophobia.

In September 2019, after meeting with Turkish President Erdogan and Malaysian Prime Minister Mahathir Mohamad at the UN General Assembly, Khan announced the decision to launch a joint TV channel in English, aimed at confronting Islamophobia.

In October 2020, Khan spoke out about what he considered growing extremism and violence against Muslims globally. In a letter posted on Twitter, he urged Facebook's CEO, Mark Zuckerberg, to ban Islamophobic content on its platform, drawing a comparison to the platform's existing ban on Holocaust denial. Khan argued that permitting hate speech against Islam while disallowing it against other groups reflected bias and could encourage further radicalisation. Khan's letter also criticised French President Emmanuel Macron, accusing him of "attacking Islam" by supporting the display of cartoons depicting Prophet Muhammad. These comments were made amidst protests in Pakistan over the republication of the cartoons.

Pakistan presented a resolution on behalf of the Organisation of Islamic Cooperation to address Islamophobia, which was adopted by the United Nations in March 2022, designating 15 March as the International Day to Combat Islamophobia.

== FATF compliance ==
In June 2018, before Khan became Prime Minister, the FATF placed Pakistan onto its grey list, requiring Pakistan to implement a series of actions to remedy deficiencies in its anti–money laundering and combating financing of terrorism (AML/CFT) laws. To address FATF recommendations, the government issued a Presidential Ordinance in December 2019, introducing significant changes to tax laws and imposing strict penalties to curb smuggling of currency, precious metals, and other valuables. These measures aimed to enhance compliance with FATF regulations and improve cooperation between institutions to combat terror financing. Subsequently, FATF-related bills, including the United Nations (Security Council) Bill 2020 and the Anti-Terrorism (Amendment) Bill 2020, were presented in Pakistan's Parliament. These bills passed both the lower house and the upper house of parliament with the support of Khan's ruling coalition and some opposition parties, although certain opposition members, such as JUI-F, strongly opposed them, claiming their views were disregarded. While the opposition PML-N proposed amendments to these bills that were accepted, they resisted the simultaneous passage of unrelated legislation. The opposition-dominated Senate blocked multiple bills, raising objections to specific provisions, including those granting authorities the power to arrest without warrants and conduct covert operations. Some opposition leaders described these as "draconian laws" that violated fundamental rights and claimed they exceeded FATF requirements. Subsequently, a joint session of both the upper and lower houses of parliament was convened, during which the bills were passed as the government utilised its majority, despite objections and a walkout by the opposition.

In July 2020, it was reported that Pakistan had become fully compliant with 14 out of the 27 action points on the Financial Action Task Force (FATF) agenda. This progress was confirmed by Lubna Farooq, Director General of the Financial Monitoring Unit (FMU), during a meeting of the National Assembly Standing Committee on Finance. However, Pakistan still faced significant challenges, remaining non-compliant on 13 points related to curbing terror financing, enforcing sanctions against proscribed organizations, and improving legal systems. Opposition lawmakers criticized the government for delays in legislative work and emphasized the gravity of the situation, noting that compliance was critical not only for exiting the FATF grey list but also for ensuring the success of the IMF programme. The FMU director general further highlighted that, apart from legislation, effective implementation of laws was essential to achieve full compliance and address FATF's concerns comprehensively. In August 2020, Khan criticized the opposition after they voted against two key bills in the Senate, accusing them of sabotaging his government's efforts to remove Pakistan from the FATF greylist. He further stated that in their attempt to secure an NRO by weakening the National Accountability Bureau, the opposition was willing to risk Pakistan being placed on the FATF blacklist, harming the economy and worsening poverty. He accused them of repeatedly threatening to topple the government unless granted an NRO. Imran added that former President General Musharraf had given NROs to two political leaders, which had quadrupled Pakistan’s debt and devastated the economy, emphasizing that there would be no more NROs.

By October 2020, Pakistan had successfully complied with 21 out of 27 points on the FATF agenda, an increase from the 14 points in February 2020. However, the FATF highlighted four critical areas requiring urgent action and decided to keep Pakistan on the grey list, urging it to complete the remaining six points by February 2021. While Pakistan's progress was acknowledged, the FATF emphasized the need for full compliance to address strategic deficiencies in combating terror financing and money laundering. In the FATF's February 2021 review, Pakistan had made significant progress, with the government having largely addressed 24 out of the 27 points on the FATF agenda. However, three remaining points were still considered partially addressed, and the FATF urged Pakistan to complete the remaining actions by June 2021. The FATF noted that the country needed to address these critical areas to fully exit the grey list. Consequently, the FATF decided to extend Pakistan's stay on the grey list until June 2021. The FATF President noted Pakistan's significant progress in implementing its action plan and stated that it was "not the time to put a country on the blacklist," while urging Pakistan to address the remaining serious deficiencies to complete its commitments.

In FATF's June 2021 review, the Khan government was credited with making significant progress, with the FATF confirming that Pakistan had largely addressed 26 out of 27 action items. While the US State Department spokesperson Ned Price praised Pakistan's efforts, he also emphasized the need for continued work, urging Pakistan to "swiftly complete" the remaining action item. Price highlighted the importance of demonstrating that terrorism financing investigations and prosecutions target senior leaders and commanders of UN-designated groups. Khan's foreign minister, Shah Mehmood Qureshi, accused India of attempting to misuse FATF for political purposes. Despite one remaining point, FATF added an additional 7-Point Action Plan focused on money laundering concerns.

Two months after Khan's ouster, FATF decided in June 2022 to remove Pakistan from the greylist, acknowledging the completion of both the 2018 and 2021 Action Plans. The Pakistan delegation, led by Hina Rabbani Khar, Minister of State for Foreign Affairs in First Shehbaz Sharif government, participated in the FATF Plenary meetings in Berlin, where the country's progress was reviewed and celebrated, especially the early completion of the 2021 Action Plan. Khan credited his government for the achievement, acknowledging his former energy minister, Hammad Azhar, who led the FATF Coordination Committee that he had established. The Ministry of Foreign Affairs under the Shehbaz government also praised the collective efforts of various government departments and security agencies in meeting FATF's action plans. While Prime Minister Shehbaz Sharif's government also claimed credit, The Express Tribune noted that most of the work had been done under the PTI government, though it could not have been accomplished without the cooperation of state institutions, including a core cell at the military headquarters which played a key role in the implementation of the FATF action plans. Pakistan was officially removed from the greylist in October 2022. The removal occurred after the successful on-site visit by the FATF technical team in August 2022.

== COVID-19 pandemic ==
On 17 March 2020, Khan addressed the nation for the first time regarding COVID-19, urging the public to remain calm rather than succumb to panic. He ruled out a complete lockdown, stating that Pakistan's circumstances differed from other countries due to widespread poverty, with 25 percent of the population living in extreme poverty. Instead, the government imposed restrictions on public gatherings, closed educational institutions, and established a national coordination committee. He also said that the government had begun preparations on 15 January, anticipating the virus’s arrival from China. As part of these measures, screening procedures were implemented at airports, with 0.9 million people screened by that point.

In his address to the nation on 22 March 2020, Khan explained his reasoning for resisting a nationwide lockdown. However, less than 24 hours after Khan's speech, Major General Babar Iftikhar, a spokesperson for the Pakistan Army, contradicted his statements by announcing the implementation of a nationwide lockdown. Following this, the military took charge of the country's COVID-19 response, with the National Core Committee being established to coordinate policy between the national and provincial governments. The military's growing involvement in crisis management was further underscored by an unnamed retired general who remarked that the army had to step in to fill the gap left by the civilian government's handling of the situation, indicating a shift in control. This military intervention highlighted the diminishing role of the civilian government and emphasized the increasing influence of the military in Pakistan's political decision-making.

On 27 March 2020, Ayesha Siddiqa wrote that Khan "appeared confused and not in charge of the situation. From poorly explaining the risks associated with the spread of the deadly coronavirus to badly calculating the pros and cons of a lockdown, the Pakistan Prime Minister has looked clueless." She also highlighted that the government was dependent on the military, with military figures taking charge of major decisions without his involvement. At the Iran–Pakistan border crossing, individuals quarantined under the government's procedures faced inadequate medical screening, poor living conditions, and a lack of sufficient healthcare resources. The camp was overcrowded, with people reporting unsanitary conditions, insufficient medical staff, and a failure to provide proper treatment. These issues contributed to the spread of the virus, as cases spiked among those held at the facility. An investigation was conducted into his health adviser, Zafar Mirza, for his alleged involvement in smuggling 20 million face masks.

"The Pakistan situation is not the same as that of the US or Europe...25 percent of our population is living in grave poverty," Khan said in a televised address. "If we shut down cities, we might save people from corona, but they will die of hunger." On 27 March, Khan's government launched a welfare programme which included a lump sum of Rs12,000 for 10 million people: five million existing recipients under the Ehsaas Programme, three million individuals whose monthly income was Rs20,000 a month, and two million unregistered daily wage workers and vendors. According to Special Assistant on Poverty Alleviation Dr. Sania Nishtar, the program would be SMS-based, and beneficiaries would be notified to collect payments from designated banks. Khan elevated the status of the construction sector to that of an industry and provided incentives for investing and trading during the period of economic pressure due to the pandemic. Key measures included tax breaks, sales tax reduction in coordination with provinces, and a subsidy of Rs30 billion to the Naya Pakistan Housing Scheme. He stated that investors in the industry would not be asked about their source of income for the year and removed withholding tax for all construction sectors except cement and steel. Additionally, capital gains tax was withdrawn for homeowners selling houses. Talking about the effect of the lockdown, Khan said, "In Pakistan, we have corona on one hand and poverty on the other. You cannot lock up 220 million people." He was concerned that a long-term lockdown would drive people to desperation with them coming onto the streets, resulting in a spike in the infection rate as well as worsening the economic situation. While referring to Wuhan's lockdown success, he said that it was only made possible because the Chinese government supplied food to individuals at home. This was the largest welfare programme in Pakistan's history, with a fund of almost $1 billion aimed at the country's poorest segment of the population. The PM's advisor, Sania Nishtar, confirmed that the programme aimed to provide relief to the most disadvantaged segments of society, particularly daily wage earners affected by the pandemic. Beneficiaries were divided into three categories: 4.5 million existing Ehsaas Kafaalat beneficiaries, all of whom were women; 3 million individuals identified through the national socioeconomic database; and 2.5 million identified via the Ehsaas SMS route.

Khan became the first to call for a global initiative on debt relief for developing countries. Subsequently, the United Nations and dozens of African countries supported Khan's appeal. Khan's government considered lockdowns implemented in other countries, they determined such measures would devastate Pakistan's already struggling economy, where many depend on daily wages. In April 2020, chief minister of Sindh, Murad Ali Shah praised the prime minister for building a consensus on lockdown measures. He had previously criticized the federal government for sending mixed signals, which he said had weakened the lockdown's effectiveness. Khan's government was praised by the World Health Organization (WHO) for its commitment to establishing temporary isolation wards in response to the COVID-19 pandemic. Instead of placing a nationwide lockdown, Khan implemented targeted measures, shutting down COVID-19 hotspots by using military technology to track and trace those exposed. This "smart lockdown" approach aimed to isolate affected areas while minimizing economic disruption. "The ISI has given us a great system for track and trace," the prime minister, Imran Khan, said in April. "It was originally used against terrorism, but now it has come in useful against coronavirus." The reliance on the military to manage the crisis also highlighted concerns about governance. Khan initially appeared unaware of the decision to deploy the military in aid of civilian authorities, raising questions about the extent of his control. The ambiguity in federal policy resulted in inconsistent implementation across the country. Religious clerics pressured the government to keep mosques open during Ramadan, leading to widespread violations of safety guidelines. In May 2020, Prime Minister Khan said the lockdown decision "was taken by the elite without thinking of the poor."

Severe public health consequences followed, as Pakistan's health system was overwhelmed by rising COVID-19 cases. Hospitals were turning away patients, and healthcare workers were contracting the virus at an alarming rate. The pandemic sent the country into its first recession in years, with negative growth recorded and a rise in poverty levels from 30% to 40%. Many businesses, especially small ones, struggled due to a lack of financial support. The informal sector, which comprised over 70% of jobs in Pakistan, saw many workers left without income, as they relied on daily wages. The government's reluctance to implement a full lockdown also meant that the country was not fully addressing the growing public health crisis. COVID-19 cases escalated rapidly, with new daily cases more than doubling in June 2020, and deaths increased. The World Health Organization warned Pakistan about the speed of the virus's spread and recommended alternating lockdowns with periods of reopening to slow the transmission. This advice was rejected by the government, citing economic priorities and fears of worsening poverty. Public compliance with safety measures was inconsistent, with many citizens, including some government officials, dismissing the virus as a hoax.

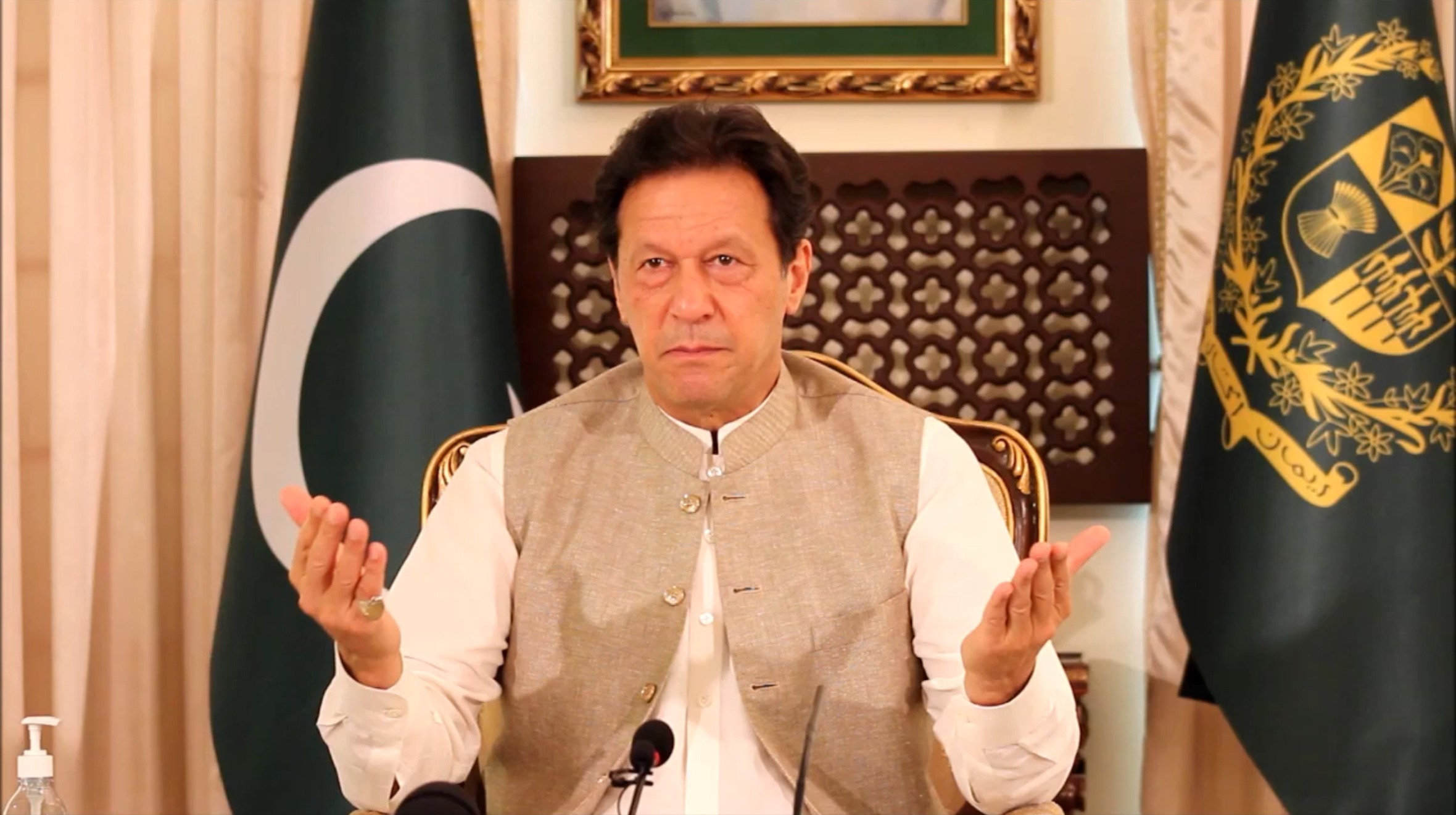
Khan speaks on the pandemic in July 2020

Following a drop in COVID-19 cases, declining positivity rates, and falling hospitalisations in June 2020, the government pointed to the success of "smart lockdowns" in stemming the virus's spread in high-risk areas. However, the initial lifting of lockdown restrictions in late May, ahead of Eid al-Fitr, led to a surge in infections, prompting warnings from health experts and federal officials. The World Health Organization had advised a two-week strict lockdown, but Khan rejected this recommendation, citing economic challenges and opting for targeted measures. The Business Standard praised Khan for his "smart lockdown" approach. However, the approach faced opposition within Pakistan from those who argued for stricter measures. Additionally, the Imperial College of London ranked Pakistan fourth for its coronavirus reproduction rate based on data from July 20, with Pakistan achieving a rate of 0.73, which was considered among the best in terms of anti-COVID efforts. Countries with a rating below 1 were regarded as performing well in combating the virus. In September 2020, Pakistan's response to the COVID-19 pandemic was praised by the WHO, which highlighted the country's use of its polio infrastructure to combat the virus. However, concerns were raised about a potential second wave of infections due to the reopening of tourist areas, with some regions seeing increased visits without strict adherence to standard operating procedures (SOPs). Economically, a significant recovery was observed in business confidence and the expected employment index. The Expected Employment Index rose by 7 percentage points to 57, suggesting businesses had positive views on generating employment in the next six months. Nonetheless, the Purchasing Managers' Index (PMI) remained in the negative zone, showing challenges in the industrial sector over the past six months. Additionally, Pakistani businesses have historically maintained optimistic views about the next six-month period, indicating a continuation of this trend rather than a sudden shift. The current account was in surplus for 3 out of 4 months after June 2020, driven by higher remittances. The exports decreased by 17% year-on-year during July–August.

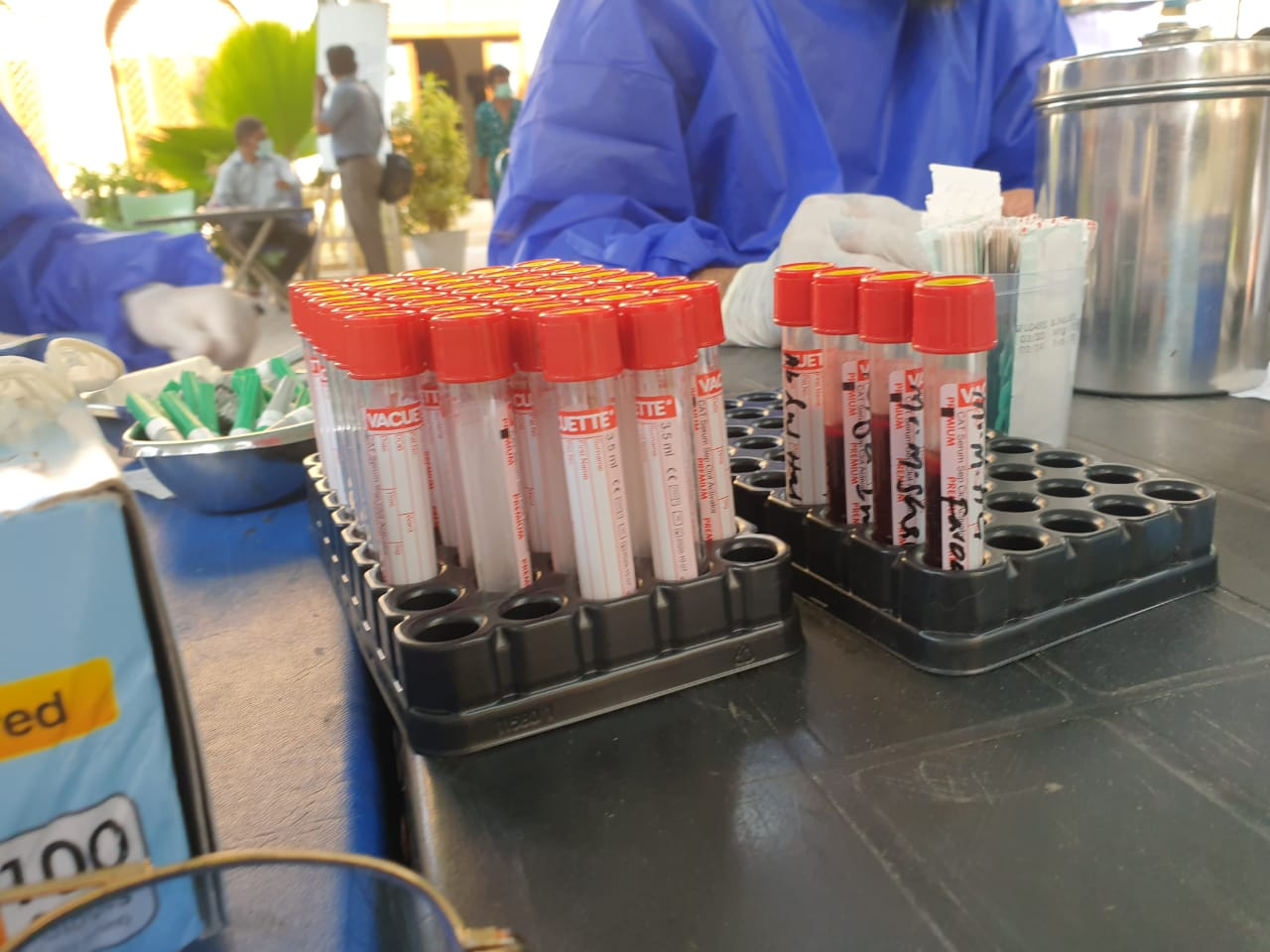
Chinese COVID-19 vaccines in Pakistan, August 2020

Khan's government presided over a recovery in Pakistan's textile sector, with demand measured by the number of orders pending hitting historic highs. To support the textile sector, Khan's government instructed the Ministry of Commerce and Industries to provide necessary facilitation, including offering concessionary rates on utilities such as electricity and reducing the electricity tariff during peak hours. However, despite the rise in demand and export orders, the Faisalabad textile industry faced a shortfall of 700 million meters of cloth. In December 2020, the Asian Development Bank stated that it sees an "economic recovery" in Pakistan, particularly in the manufacturing and construction sectors. Signs of recovery emerged as exports reached pre-COVID-19 levels towards the end of 2020. Despite the recovery in exports, challenges persisted in other sectors. Food security remained a concern, with food being inaccessible to poor and vulnerable communities, as noted by European Union Ambassador Androulla Kaminara. Rising food inflation, the cost of production, and bad weather further contributed to these challenges. Additionally, inadequate internet infrastructure was highlighted as a barrier to supporting economic activities during and beyond the pandemic. The IMF reported that Pakistan's public debt-to-GDP ratio remained broadly unchanged in 2020, despite a global trend of rising debt during the pandemic, with most emerging and developing economies witnessing a substantial 10% rise on average. However, the country faced rising inflation, with the Consumer Price Index (CPI) increasing to 11% from 6% a few months earlier.

COVID-19 deaths in Pakistan as shown on 22 May 2021

In a Gallup Pakistan survey conducted as part of a global study and released in 2021, 73% of Pakistanis expressed satisfaction with the government's handling of the coronavirus pandemic, while 23% believed the government did a poor job. The survey noted that Pakistan's satisfaction level matched the average in the Asia-Pacific region and ranked the country 8th among 32 nations surveyed. The report also highlighted a global trend where citizens tended to rally behind their governments during the pandemic. Following the recovery in the textile sector, export growth reached 9% in February 2021. The State Bank of Pakistan highlighted the ongoing pickup in exports, particularly in high-value-added textiles. However, despite this positive development, overall exports for the first eight months of FY21 saw a 2.27% decline compared to the corresponding period of the previous year ($16.07 billion versus $16.44 billion). Simultaneously, imports surged by 27% in February 2021 compared to February 2020, contributing to a widening trade deficit.

COVID-19 deaths in Pakistan per 100,000 cases as shown on 22 May 2021

In early 2021, Pakistan's apparel exports to the US experienced significant growth in value and volume, surpassing India and performing better than usual compared to Bangladesh. To address a critical shortage of cotton, a key raw material for textiles and apparel, the government of Pakistan allowed duty-free imports of cotton yarn, supporting the sector's performance. However, despite this growth, Pakistan faced significant challenges, particularly in cotton production, with the country falling short by around half of its cotton requirement, estimated at seven million bales. The government's decision to allow duty-free imports of cotton yarn was a response to this shortfall. Fitch Ratings forecasted a fall in Pakistan's public debt-to-GDP ratio, primarily reflecting the rupee's appreciation against the US dollar and high nominal GDP growth in 2021. However, despite the expected decline in the debt ratio, Fitch also pointed out several challenges for the country. Public finances remained a key weakness, with the general government fiscal deficit projected at 7.5% of GDP in FY21, higher than the "B" median of 6.2%. Additionally, Pakistan's government interest burden as a share of revenue was estimated at 38.7% in FY21, far above the "B" median of 12.5%. This policy of tax concessions was codified at least in the short term when Khan's government unveiled its budget for 2021–22, which had reduced customs duty on imports of inputs (raw materials) for final manufactured goods. The government's decision to reduce or exempt customs duties and other taxes on inputs for final manufactured goods was part of a broader set of relief measures aimed at supporting industrial growth. These included reductions in customs duties on 584 tariff lines related to the textile sector and exemptions for raw materials across other industries, such as pharmaceuticals and engineering. However, the revenue impact of these reliefs was considerable, with an estimated Rs119 billion in foregone revenue, including Rs42 billion specifically from customs duties. This placed additional pressure on the government's fiscal position, which had already set an ambitious target for the Federal Board of Revenue (FBR) in FY22. To compensate for the revenue loss, the government proposed other tax measures, such as a 17% sales tax on several imported food items and luxury goods, which were expected to generate Rs35 billion. In July 2021, The Economist ranked Pakistan third on its normalcy index for handling the pandemic, with a score of 84.4. Khan congratulated the National Command and Operation Center (NCOC), as well as the State Bank of Pakistan and the Ehsaas Programme, for their role in Pakistan's response to the pandemic. After this ranking, Pakistan saw a rise in daily COVID-19 cases, with the positivity rate exceeding 3% after remaining below 2% earlier in the year.

== No-confidence motion and removal from office ==
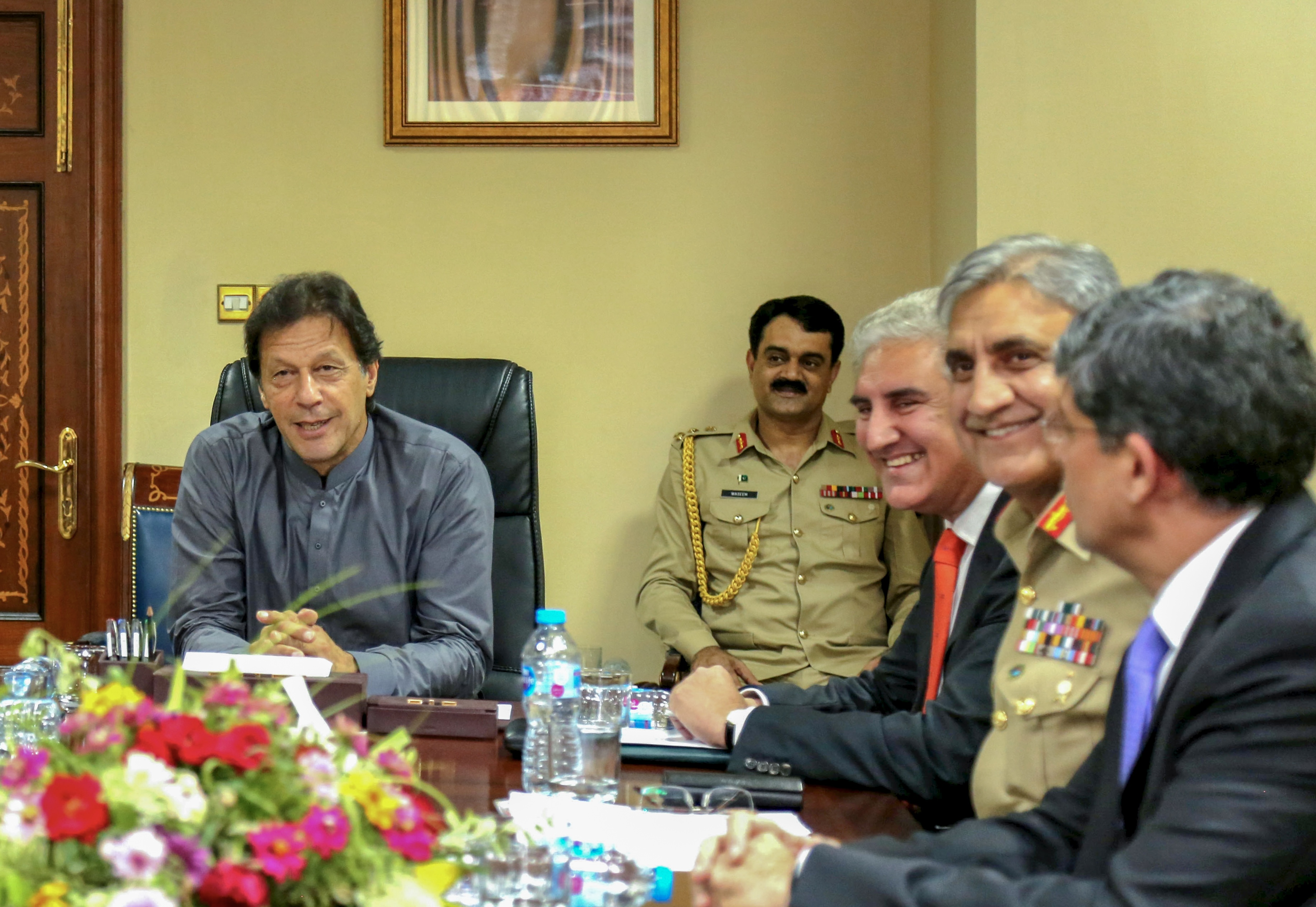
Imran Khan, accompanied by foreign minister Shah Mehmood Qureshi and Chief of Army Staff Qamar Javed Bajwa in 2018.

According to a leaked classified Pakistani cipher, at a 7 March 2022 meeting between the Pakistani ambassador to the United States, Asad Majeed Khan, and two State Department officials, including Donald Lu, the US State Department expressed concerns about Khan's neutrality on the Russian invasion of Ukraine. The leaked cipher, as reported by The Intercept, includes a statement attributed to Donald Lu: "I think if the no-confidence vote against the Prime Minister succeeds, all will be forgiven in Washington because the Russia visit is being looked at as a decision by the Prime Minister. Otherwise, I think it will be tough going ahead." The US State Department objected to Khan's visit to Russia on the day of the invasion of Ukraine, both privately and publicly. However, the US denied any role in Khan's removal from power. State Department spokesman Matthew Miller stated that the allegations of US interference in Pakistan's internal affairs are "false" and emphasized that the US expressed concerns about Khan's "policy choices" rather than expressing a preference for Pakistan's leadership. The leaked cipher, as reported, suggests that the State Department officials warned of potential economic and political isolation for Pakistan if Khan remained in office. However, the US never explicitly encouraged the removal of Khan. Instead, the US expressed concerns about the implications of Khan's policies on US-Pakistan relations. The US has consistently reiterated that its concerns were related to policy choices rather than any attempt to influence Pakistan's internal political matters.

On 8 March 2022, opposition parties in Pakistan submitted a no-confidence motion against Khan to the National Assembly Secretariat. The motion was signed by 86 opposition lawmakers, including Shahbaz Sharif, Marriyum Aurangzeb, Khawaja Saad Rafique, Ayaz Sadiq, Rana Sanaullah, Naveed Qamar, and Shazia Marri. The opposition parties claimed to have the support of 202 National Assembly lawmakers, including members from the ruling PTI and allied parties, although the PTI leadership was confident of defeating the motion. Opposition leaders argued that the no-confidence motion was necessary due to the government's mismanagement of the economy and governance, particularly in the face of rising inflation and economic challenges. Khan and his party rejected the allegations, with Khan asserting that the opposition was engaged in a political move to remove him from power, accusing them of using money and external support to weaken his government. Despite the opposition's claims of a majority, the government remained confident in its ability to maintain control and defeat the motion. On 18 March, some of his party members showed an intention to withdraw their support from him. Two of the major coalition partners of his government decided to join opposition ranks which resulted in him losing his majority in the National Assembly of Pakistan.

On 27 March 2022, Khan displayed a letter at a rally, claiming it contained evidence of a "foreign conspiracy" to remove his government. The letter, a cipher received from Pakistan's Ambassador to the US, Asad Majeed, reportedly contained a warning from US official Donald Lu about the impact of Khan's continued leadership on US-Pakistan bilateral relations. Khan later linked this to the US's opposition to his independent foreign policy. Following this, on 31 March, Khan chaired a National Security Council (NSC) meeting that included ministers, senior officers, and the chiefs of the three branches of the Pakistan Armed Forces. During the meeting, the NSC expressed grave concern over a "formal communication" from a foreign official to Pakistan's ambassador, terming the language "undiplomatic" and the communication a "blatant interference in the internal affairs of Pakistan." The council decided to issue a "strong demarche" to the country in question through diplomatic channels. However, after reviewing the matter, the NSC found no evidence of a foreign conspiracy.

The same day, Khan reiterated his claims that a "foreign conspiracy" was behind efforts to remove him, linking it to his administration's independent foreign policy. He warned his party's dissidents and political rivals that future generations would not forgive them nor their handlers, emphasizing that an independent foreign policy is vital to Pakistan's sovereignty. Khan referred to a letter he had presented earlier, implying foreign powers were involved, and claimed the country behind it knew of the impending no-trust vote before it was filed by the opposition. In a slip of the tongue, Khan initially named the US but quickly corrected himself, saying it was "some other foreign country." Khan also addressed his visit to Russia, accusing foreign powers of issuing threats over it. "We are a nation of 220 million, and another country... is issuing threats because I went to Russia," he said. He clarified that the decision to visit Russia was made after consultations with Pakistan's Foreign Office and military leadership, but foreign powers blamed him personally for the visit. He added that these foreign powers had no issue with the people who would replace him, as they were aware where their money and properties were. Khan criticized political figures like Shehbaz Sharif, Asif Ali Zardari, and Fazal-ur-Rehman accusing them of being favored by foreign powers due to their financial ties and not condemning drone attacks during their time in power. Khan labeled these figures as the "three stooges," loyal to foreign powers. He warned that those involved in the conspiracy would be remembered as "Mir Jafars and Mir Sadiqs of today," referencing traitors from the past, and vowed to continue fighting against the conspiracy, declaring, "I will still be standing in its way." However, while Khan claimed the existence of a "threat letter," he did not make the document publicly available. The letter was shared with select members of the federal cabinet and a small group of journalists but was not presented to the media or the general public. The opposition had already gathered the required support for the no-confidence motion.

On 3 April 2022, President Arif Alvi dissolved the National Assembly of Pakistan on Khan's advice, after the Deputy Speaker of the National Assembly rejected the motion of no confidence. This move required elections to the National Assembly to be held within 90 days. The opposition called the rejection of the no-confidence motion as "unconstitutional" and moved the Supreme Court on 3 April 2022 against the dissolution of the National Assembly. A three-member bench of Pakistan's Supreme Court began hearings on the opposition's plea, with Chief Justice Umar Ata Bandial noting that all orders and actions regarding the dissolution would be subject to the court's ruling.

On 5 April 2022, Russian Foreign Ministry Spokesperson Maria Zakharova criticized the United States for "another attempt of shameless interference" in Pakistan's internal affairs, alleging it sought to punish a "disobedient" Imran Khan. She noted that after the announcement of Khan's visit to Moscow in February, the US and its allies exerted pressure on him to cancel the trip. Zakharova stated that on 7 March, a senior US official, identified in Pakistani media as Donald Lu, condemned Pakistan's balanced stance on Ukraine and implied that US-Pakistan relations were contingent on Khan's removal. She concluded that these actions demonstrated the US's interference for selfish purposes.

On 10 April 2022, Khan sent the diplomatic cypher to Bandial, claiming that a foreign country had used Pakistan's ambassador to send a threatening message. Despite serious concern from the legal wing, who stated that the diplomatic cypher came under the purview of the Official Secrets Act, 1923, and that disclosing it could violate the Prime Minister's oath under Article 91(5) of the Constitution, Khan proceeded with sending it to the Chief Justice. The legal advice noted that neither the sender nor the recipient of the cypher, in this case the Prime Minister, could make it public. Sharing the cypher could lead to legal trouble, as it might result in disqualification under Article 62(1)(f) of the Constitution for violating the oath of office. Senior lawyers also warned that such actions could prompt a petition for Khan's disqualification.

On 10 April, following a Supreme Court ruling that the no-confidence motion had been illegally rejected, a no-confidence vote was conducted, and Khan was ousted from office. A total of 174 out of 342 members voted in favour of the resolution, with none of the presumed PTI defectors voting in its favour. This made Khan the first prime minister in Pakistan's history to be removed from office through a vote of no confidence. Khan claimed the US was behind his removal because he conducted an independent foreign policy and had friendly relations with China and Russia. His removal led to protests from his supporters across Pakistan. While Khan's supporters accused the US of orchestrating his removal, the US State Department denied these allegations. Additionally, Khan's removal also came amid significant internal political challenges, including strained relations with Pakistan's military and accusations of economic mismanagement.

On 14 April 2022, Khan said that in the context of the no-confidence motion against him in the National Assembly, three scenarios were discussed with the establishment. These scenarios were said to include "resignation, no-confidence [vote] or elections". However, the ISPR clarified that the establishment did not provide these options directly but instead discussed various scenarios with the Prime Minister after his request for mediation to resolve the political crisis. According to the ISPR, the military's involvement was to help navigate the political impasse, not to present explicit choices to the Prime Minister's office.

Following his ouster, the Pakistan Army's spokesperson clarified that while external interference in Pakistan's internal affairs was acknowledged during a meeting of the NSC, leading to the 'strong' demarche issued to an unnamed country over the threat letter, the word "conspiracy" was not used in the official statement by the committee. The DG ISPR clarified that demarches are issued for various reasons, not solely for conspiracies. He stated that in this case, it was issued due to undiplomatic language. Subsequently, the new government held another NSC meeting, rejecting the claim that Khan's government was removed through a foreign conspiracy. However, they quietly agreed with the earlier meeting, chaired by Khan's government, that the U.S. had interfered in Pakistan's internal affairs. The military, through the Director General of Inter-Services Public Relations, later clarified that even during the previous NSC meeting chaired by Khan, it had not concluded that a foreign conspiracy had been hatched. In November 2022, when asked about the conspiracy to remove him, Khan said "it's behind me. The Pakistan I want to lead must have good relationships with everyone, especially the United States. Our relationship with the US has been as of a master-servant relationship, or a master-slave relationship, and we've been used like a hired gun. But for that I blame my own governments more than the US". Khan's remarks about improving ties with the US marked a significant shift from his earlier rhetoric, where he repeatedly accused Washington of orchestrating his removal from office. While he expressed his willingness to work with the US if re-elected, and said he wanted a "dignified" relationship, critics, including Prime Minister Shehbaz Sharif, contended that Khan's past actions and rhetoric had damaged Pakistan's external relations. Sharif accused Khan of inflicting "irreparable damage" on the country's international standing. Furthermore, analysts like Mosharraf Zaidi suggested that Khan's U-turn on the US was likely a strategic move, noting that it was "inevitable" given the changing political landscape. Zaidi argued that Khan had previously used the US conspiracy narrative to rally his base while diverting attention away from tensions with Pakistan's military leadership. Some critics also pointed out that Khan's anti-American rhetoric had helped bolster his popularity among certain segments of the population, but his shift in stance might now be a calculated effort to regain broader political support.

== See also ==
- List of international prime ministerial trips made by Imran Khan

== Bibliography ==
- Gholam Mujtaba (22 October 2018), The Political Ecology of Pakistan, FriesenPress, p. 87, ISBN 978-1-52-553461-4
