= Oath of office ceremony of Imran Khan =

2018 oath of office ceremony of the Prime Minister of Pakistan

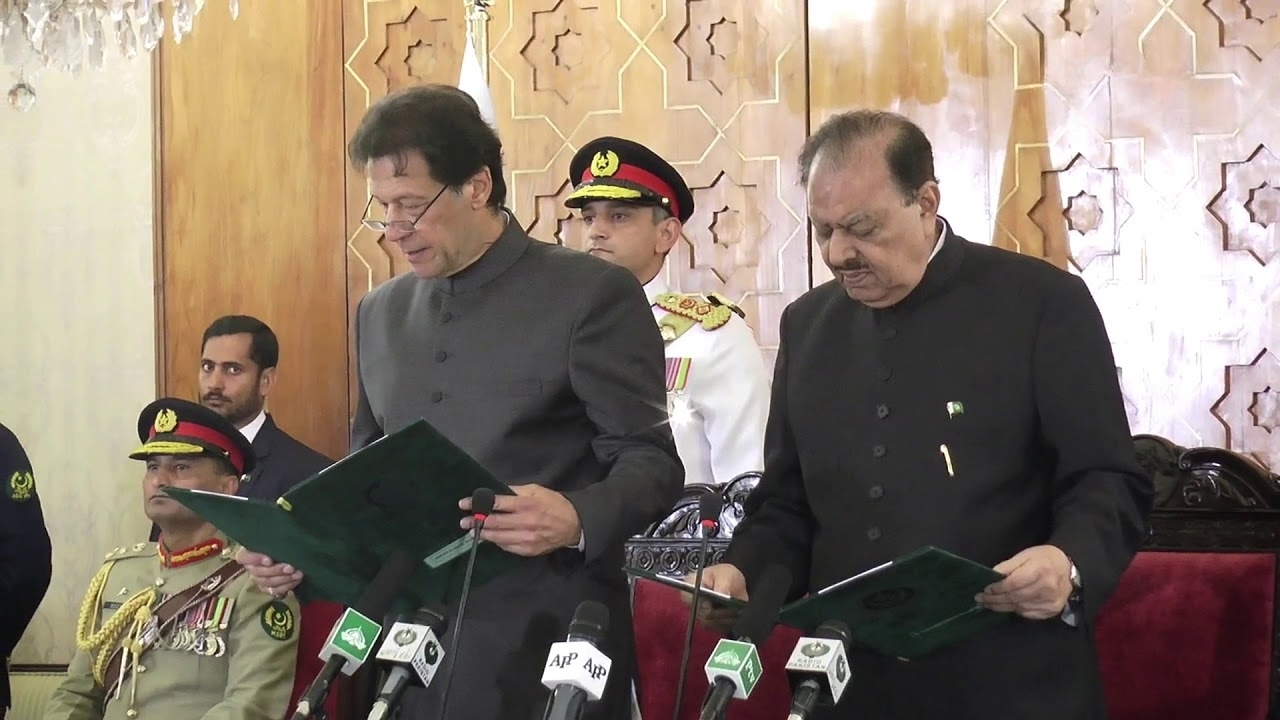
- Imran Khan taking oath as 22nd Prime Minister of Pakistan alongside then President Mamnoon Hussain on 18 August 2018
- Date: August 18, 2018; 7 years ago
- Location: Aiwan-e-Sadr Islamabad 33°43′56″N 73°05′54″E
- Participants: Prime Minister of Pakistan, Imran Khan (Assuming office); President of Pakistan, Mamnoon Hussain (Administering oath)

The oath of office ceremony of Imran Khan, the 22nd Prime Minister of Pakistan, was held at the President House in Islamabad on 18 August 2018. Following the conclusion of the ceremony, Khan proceeded to the Prime Minister's Office, where he was presented a guard of honour by contingents of all three armed forces of Pakistan.

== Background ==
Following the general election on 25 July 2018, Imran Khan's Pakistan Tehreek-e-Insaf (PTI) emerged as the largest political party in Pakistan. It secured 116 general seats in the 15th National Assembly. A further nine independent candidates allied themselves with the PTI, and with the addition of 28 reserved seats for women and five seats for minorities, the PTI's total tally increased to 158 in the 342-member assembly.

The PTI also enlisted support from smaller parties including: the Pakistan Muslim League (Q) (three members), Muttahida Qaumi Movement (seven members), Balochistan Awami Party (five members), Balochistan National Party (Mengal) (four members), Grand Democratic Alliance (three members) as well as the Awami Muslim League and Jamhoori Watan Party (one member each), providing it the comfortable majority to form a coalition government, and making Khan the clear forerunner for prime minister. The first session of the assembly was held on 13 August, during which all elected members took the parliamentary oath.

On 17 August 2018, Khan secured 176 votes and became 22nd Prime Minister of Pakistan while his contender and eventual leader of opposition Shehbaz Sharif received 96 votes. The session was summoned at 3:30 pm PST, during which an open ballot took place amongst assembly members to elect the prime minister.

In the run-up to the first assembly session, a series of party meetings took place at Khan's residence in Bani Gala to determine members of Khan's incoming cabinet.

== Ceremony ==
The ceremony, hosted at the Aiwan-e-Sadr in Islamabad, was scheduled to begin at 9:30 am PKT but started a little after 10:00 am PKT. The ceremony started with the playing of the Qaumi Taranah, followed by a recitation from the Quran.

Khan wore a simple black sherwani for the ceremony. First Lady of Pakistan Bushra Bibi was also in attendance. The first lady was clad in a white abaya. She sat in the first row next to National Assembly speaker Asad Qaiser. This was Bushra's first public appearance since her wedding to Khan earlier in 2018.

The oath of office was administered in Urdu to Khan by the then-President Mamnoon Hussain and the state broadcaster PTV televised it live.

The nine-course meal traditionally served after the oath of office ceremony was replaced with refreshments due to Khan's “austerity drive”. It was served in the grand hall of the President's House.

=== Invitees ===
Former Indian cricketer Navjot Singh Sidhu arrived in Pakistan via the Wagha border to attend the oath-taking ceremony. Several members of Pakistan's 1992 Cricket World Cup winning squad, including Rameez Raja, Wasim Akram, Mushtaq Ahmed and Inzamam-ul-Haq were also present at the ceremony.

Celebrities that attended the ceremony included, actor Jawed Sheikh and singers Salman Ahmad and Abrar ul Haq.

The notable guests that were present at the ceremony included, caretaker Prime Minister Nasirul Mulk, National Assembly speaker Asad Qaiser, Punjab Assembly speaker Chaudhry Pervez Elahi, Chief of Army Staff Gen Qamar Javed Bajwa, Chief of Air Staff Marshal Mujahid Anwar Khan, Chief of Naval Staff Admiral Zafar Mahmood Abbasi and former National Assembly speaker Fehmida Mirza.
