= Ehsaas Programme =

Poverty alleviation program in Pakistan

- Abbreviation: BISP (NSER)
- Formation: March 27, 2019; 7 years ago
- Founder: Imran Khan
- Founded at: Islamabad
- Type: Social safety net
- Headquarters: Islamabad
- Location: All over Pakistan Ehsaas Payment Center, Pakistan
- Methods: Donations, scholarship
- Owner: Government of Pakistan
- Chairperson of BISP (NSER): Imran Khan

Ehsaas Programme (Urdu: احساس پروگرام lit. 'Compassion') was a social safety net and poverty alleviation programme launched by the Government of Pakistan in 2019. Imran Khan, the then Prime Minister of Pakistan, called it a key initiative towards a welfare state that the Pakistan Tehreek-e-Insaf party had promised to the people of Pakistan in their election manifesto. It is aimed at uplifting the backward class, reducing inequality, investing in the masses, and lifting-off the lagging districts in the country.

A separate ministry was established under the Poverty Alleviation and Social Safety Division, which is headed by the Special Assistant to the Prime Minister serving as chairperson of the Benazir Income Support Programme. As of 2021, the Ehsaas Programme has three major pillars: Ehsaas Emergency Cash (introduced during the COVID-19 pandemic), Ehsaas Taleemi Wazaif Program and Ehsaas Kafalat. The latter programme expanded its coverage from 7 million people to 10 million people in 2021.

The Ehsaas Emergency Cash programme was Khan's flagship welfare policy during the COVID-19 pandemic in Pakistan; it received praise from the World Bank, which listed it amongst the top global social protection measures and said that it ranked highly in terms of actual coverage rates compared to planned coverage rates. During the COVID-19 pandemic, the welfare programme covered millions of lower-income Pakistani families with monthly stipends handed out to 13.2 million people.

== Background ==
Khan's Pakistan Tehreek-e-Insaf contested in the 2018 Pakistani general elections and promised in his party manifesto to launch different social safety programmes consisting of 16 programmes and improve the Benazir Income Support Programme to cover a much larger portion of the population through digitization and specific targeting.

== Objective ==
The Ehsaas Programme was the flagship social protection measure to lead towards a welfare state that is embodied in the Constitution of Pakistan. Its aim was to create precision safety nets, promote financial inclusion and access to digital services, support women's economic empowerment, focus on the central role of human capital formation for poverty eradication, economic growth, and sustainable development, and overcome financial barriers to accessing health and post-secondary education. Article 38(D) in the chapter Principles of Policy of the Constitution of Pakistan is about the promotion of the social and economic well-being of the people. Through Amendements to the Constitution of Pakistan, the government vowed to make food, clothing, housing, education, and medical relief as fundamental rights of the citizens and the duty of the state.

== Eligibility ==
The programme was for the extremely poor, orphans, widows, the homeless, the disabled, those who risk medical impoverishment, the jobless, poor farmers, laborers, the sick and undernourished, students from low-income backgrounds, poor women and elderly citizens. This plan was also about lifting lagging areas where poverty is higher.

== Programme structure ==
Ehsaas was formally launched on March 27, 2019, by the federal government. It included different social safety programs like the Ehsaas Emergency Cash Program, Ehsaas Panaah Gah, Ehsaas Taleemi Wazif, Ehsaas Petrol Card, Ehsaas Ration Riyaat, and Ehsaas Scholarships, among others, that are aimed at uplifting the social security of the masses. Its poverty reduction strategy is articulated in four pillars and embodies 134 policy actions. The key initiatives include Ehsaas Kafaalat, Ehsaas Aamdan, Ehsaas Emergency Cash during the COVID-19 pandemic, Ehsaas Scholarships, Ehsaas Cash Assistance for Women, and Ehsaas Free Atta, among others. Benazir Income Support Programme was also made part of Poverty Alleviation and Social Security Division.

== Reception ==
The Ehsaas programme has been viewed as a success by national and international experts. It helped bring about positive change and is seen as a global model for poverty reduction. The World Bank doubled its assistance for the programme after seeing the progress and declared it a role model for other countries. The Ehsaas Emergency Cash Programme successfully protected the poor and daily wage earners in the country who were affected by lockdowns by providing cash disbursements during the COVID-19 pandemic. Sania Nishtar has been accredited as the person behind the programme's success.
