= Sania Nishtar =

Pakistani activist (born 1963)

Sania Nishtar SI FRCP
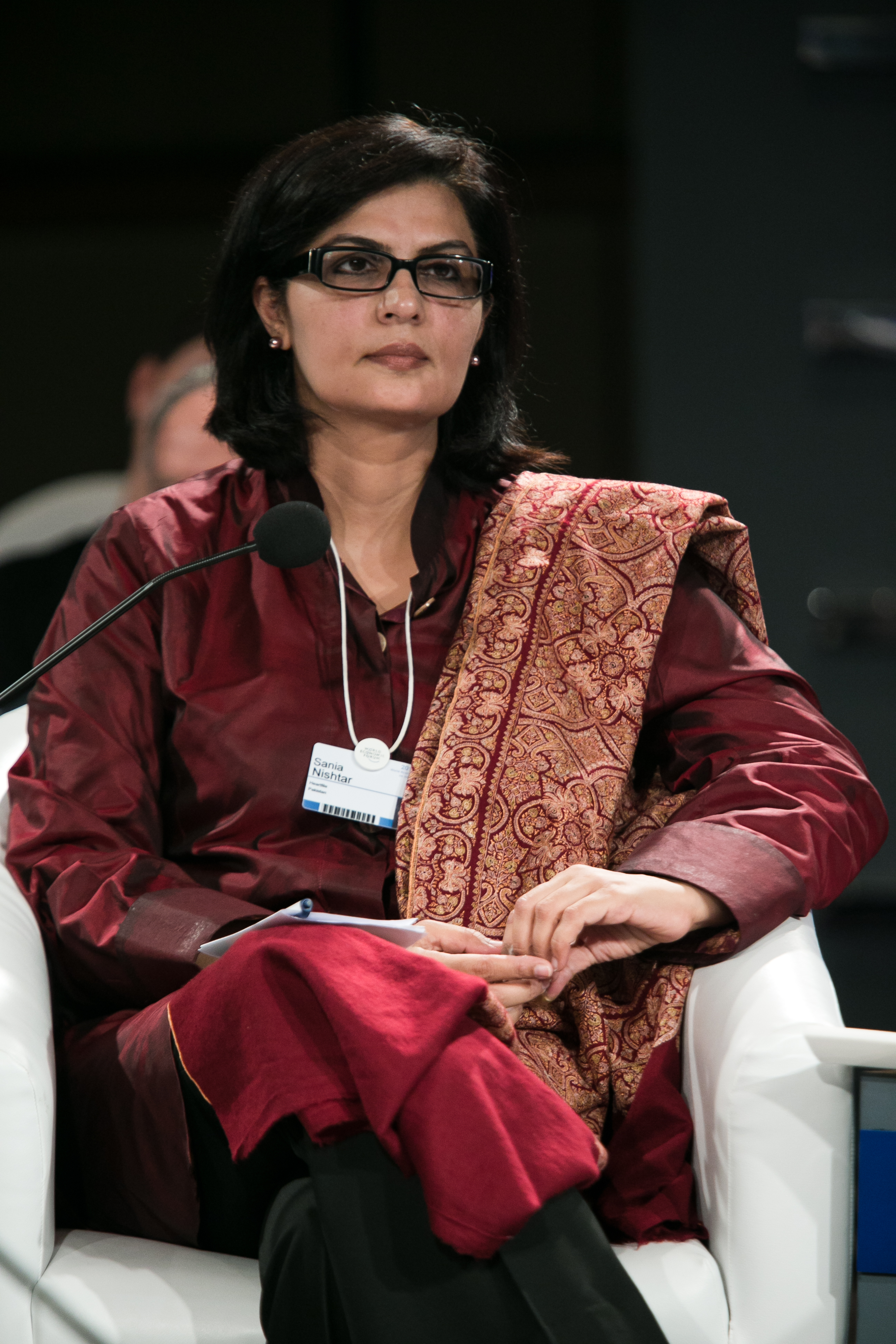

CEO, GAVI

Special Assistant to the Prime Minister for Poverty Alleviation and Social Safety (Federal Minister)
- In office 15 May 2019 – 10 April 2022
- President: Arif Alvi
- Prime Minister: Imran Khan

Chairperson of Benazir Income Support Programme
- In office 30 October 2018 – 10 April 2022
- Prime Minister: Imran Khan
- Preceded by: Marvi Memon

Chairperson of Ehsaas Programme
- In office 15 May 2019 – 10 April 2022
- Prime Minister: Imran Khan
- Preceded by: Position Established

Member of the Senate of Pakistan
- In office 12 March 2021 – 30 October 2024
- Constituency: Khyber Pakhtunkhwa

Personal details
- Born: 16 February 1963 (age 63) Peshawar, Khyber Pakhtunkhwa, Pakistan
- Spouse: Ghalib Nishtar
- Education: Khyber Medical College; King's College London (Ph.D.)
- Known for: Work in development of health in Pakistan
- Awards: Sitara-i-Imtiaz (2005); Global Innovation Award (2011)
- Website: Official website

Sania Nishtar SI FRCP (Urdu: ثانیہ نشتر; born 16 February 1963) is a Pakistani physician, cardiologist, senator, author and activist who was appointed CEO of Gavi, the Vaccine Alliance in 2024. Nishtar previously served as Special Assistant on Poverty Alleviation and Social Safety to the Prime Minister of Pakistan, with the status of Federal Minister, and chairperson Ehsaas Programme. She was elected to the Senate of Pakistan in the 2021 Senate election from Khyber Pakhtunkhwa. Previously she served in the interim federal cabinet in 2013 overseeing public health, education and science.

Nishtar co-chaired WHO's High-Level Commission on Non-communicable diseases along with the Presidents of Uruguay, Finland and Sri Lanka. She is a member of the World Economic Forum's Global Agenda Council on the future of healthcare and co-chairs the U.S National Academy of Sciences Global Study on the Quality of Healthcare in low and middle-income countries. In addition, she also chairs the United Nations International Institute for Global Health's International Advisory Board, and she is a member of the International Advisory Board on Global Health of the German Federal Government.

Born in Peshawar, Nishtar went to medical school at Khyber Medical College and graduated top of her class in 1986. She was inducted into the College of Physicians & Surgeons of Pakistan in 1991 after completing her residency at Khyber Teaching Hospital. She joined the Pakistan Institute of Medical Sciences as a cardiologist in 1994 and worked with the institute until 2007. She left the institute on sabbatical twice, first in 1996 to at the Guy's Hospital in London, and again in 1999 to pursue her Ph.D. in medicine from the King's College London, which she received in 2002. She became a fellow of Royal College of Physicians in 2005. In 2019, King's College London awarded her a doctorate in science, honoris causa.

In 1998, Nishtar founded Heartfile, an Islamabad-based health policy think tank. Since 2014, Nishtar has been a co-chair of the WHO Commission on Ending Childhood Obesity and also serves on the board of United Nations University's Institute for Global Health. Nishtar was a leading candidate for director-general of the World Health Organization, to be elected in May 2017. She was among the shortlisted three nominees in the election held in January 2017, but was not successful in the final election held on 23 May 2017. Nishtar's late father, Syed Hamid, was a much respected doctor hailing from a very well-reputed syed family. She is married to Ghalib Nishtar, the grandson of Sardar Abdur Rab Nishtar, a leading figure in the Pakistan movement.

== Education ==
Nishtar graduated from Khyber Medical College with her Bachelor of Medicine, Bachelor of Surgery in 1986 and was Best Graduate of the Year. She holds a Fellowship of the Royal College of Physicians and a PhD from King's College London. In 2019, King's College London awarded her a doctorate in science, honoris causa.

== Career ==
=== Medicine ===
After several years as a cardiologist at the Pakistan Institute of Medical Sciences, Nishtar founded Heartfile in 1999, which has grown from a health information-focused NGO to a health policy think tank, focused on health systems issues.

In 2007, Nishtar founded Heartfile Health Financing, a program to protect poor patients from medical impoverishment.

The program is a 2008, 2012, and 2013 Commitment of the Clinton Global Initiative. She also founded Pakistan's Health Policy Forum, a civil society policy platform for health experts that has garnered contributions from prominent global health advocates including Seth Berkley, Sir George Alleyne, Mark Dybul, and Naresh Trehan, in addition to many others.

Dr Sania Nishtar was also the chair person of the Benazir Income support Program and ehsaas Program during the government of PTI.

=== Politics ===
Nishtar served as Federal Minister in the Government of Pakistan of Prime Minister Mir Hazar Khan Khoso during the 2013 caretaker government, in charge of Science and Technology, Education and Trainings and Information Technology and Telcom. She also had responsibility as focal person for health.

During her term, Nishtar was instrumental in establishing Pakistan's Ministry of Health, which she had been advocating for. At the conclusion of her term she published Handover Papers, She also refused pay and perks and left an unusual gift for government functionaries. Her policies remained focused on promoting development; in the education sector linking academia with entrepreneurs, industry and the national priorities, and in the Ministry of IT by using the telecom sector for development. During her term in office as minister, she prevailed upon the Prime Minister to reverse the decision to dismantle the Prime Minister's Polio cell, and saved the government from what could have been an e-voting embarrassment.

In 2015, Nishtar was the Government of Pakistan's candidate to succeed António Guterres as United Nations High Commissioner for Refugees; the post eventually went to Filippo Grandi of Italy.

Nishtar later became Pakistan's candidate to succeed Margaret Chan as director-general of WHO. In April 2016, the Organization of Islamic Cooperation, which has 57 member states and aims to serve as the collective voice for Muslims, "welcomed" Nishtar's candidacy.

Nishtar was one of the two favorite candidates in the shortlisting election in January 2017, where she secured 28 out of 34 votes. She qualified to be one of the three official nominees by WHO.

Her candidature received broad-based support from within Pakistan, from the government, civil society and women's groups. Many high-profile Pakistanis came in support of her, such as Sharmeen Obaid-Chinoy, Pakistan's Oscar Winner filmmaker. International experts highlighted her merits shown in this Lancet (journal) letter. She was strongly supported by humanitarians including Sir George Alleyne, Princess Dina Mired of Jordan, and Musimbi Kanyoro. Various aspects of her professional life were highlighted. Robert and Ruth Bonita explained why she was the suitable candidate outlining her NCDs and health systems credentials. Voices from Latin America supported her civil society background. Others supported her because of her reform credentials and mix of civil society, ministerial and multilateral experience, and others emphasized her accountability credentials. Other views supported the three candidates to varying extents.

Nishtar emphasized on the need for transparency and accountability during her election campaign, and was referred to as the 'changemaker'. Nishtar was defeated by Tedros Adanhom Ghebreusus in the final election in May 2017. Her defeat disappointed Pakistanis but her ethical conduct during the election and the prestige it brought for Pakistan was widely hailed.

In May 2019, Nishtar was appointed Special Assistant on Poverty Alleviation and Social Safety Nets for Prime Minister Imran Khan. In this role, she led the roll-out of Ehsaas, a pioneering multisectoral poverty alleviation and welfare programme for Pakistan which encompassed over 130 policies.

=== Peace-building activities ===
Nishtar was the chair of the health committee of the Aman ki Asha initiative, a campaign for peace between India and Pakistan, for which she has convened several meetings and negotiated declarations. As a member of the Pakistan Chapter of the Partners for a New Beginning, Aspen Institute, and a member of the Global Advisory Council of the Pakistan American Foundation and the US-Muslim Engagement Initiative she has been advocating for broader US-Pakistan engagement, towards improving social outcomes.

== Advocacy ==
Nishtar's domestic focus is on health sector governance. This was illustrated recently in the case of her stance on a spurious drug scandal, abolition of the Ministry of Health, which was part of the Eighteenth Amendment to the Constitution of Pakistan, and the country's inability to eradicate polio. She also contributes time as a volunteer to health systems strengthening in her country and has signed two MoUs with Pakistan's Ministry of Health, committing her time pro bono. She authored Pakistan's first compendium of health statistics, and the country's first national public health plan for non-communicable diseases. Nishtar's book Choked Pipes, an analysis of Pakistan's health systems, became the blue print for the country's health policy. She is a member of many health initiatives in Pakistan. Through her writings she has become a proponent of governance reforms in Pakistan, and is a member of many national and international boards and initiatives, which aim to improve governance in the country, including the Pakistan Institute of Legislative Development and Transparency. She was a member of the Asia Society Task Force on Pakistan 2020, and was formerly a director of IESCO. She also served on Pakistan's Economic Advisory Council, and was the chair of the steering committee for Pakistan's National Vision for Surgical Care.

Nishtar has been involved with many international agencies in various capacities. She has served as temporary advisor to the World Health Organization and other UN initiatives, including the following:

- WHO Alliance for Health Policy and Systems Research (AHPSR), Member of the Board
- WHO Commission on Ending Childhood Obesity, co-chairwoman
- Eastern Mediterranean Health Journal, Member of the Editorial Board
- Scaling Up Nutrition Movement, Member of the Lead Group (since 2016, appointed by United Nations Secretary-General Ban Ki-moon)

In addition, Nishtar continues to hold several board positions, including the following:

- World Economic Forum, Member of the Global Agenda Council
- Health Global Challenge initiative, Member of the Board of Trustees
- Clinton Global Initiative, Member of the Board of Trustees
- The Lancet, Member of the International Advisory Board on Global Health
- Journal of Pharmaceutical Policy and Practice, Member of the Editorial Board

Nishtar is also a member of the Lancet and Rockefeller Foundation Commission on Planetary Health and the Lancet and Harvard Commission on Pain and Palliative Care. She is a member of the Steering Committee of the Emerging Markets Symposium, which is an initiative of the Green Templeton College, Oxford University. She is also a member of the board of the United Nations University International Institute for Global Health.

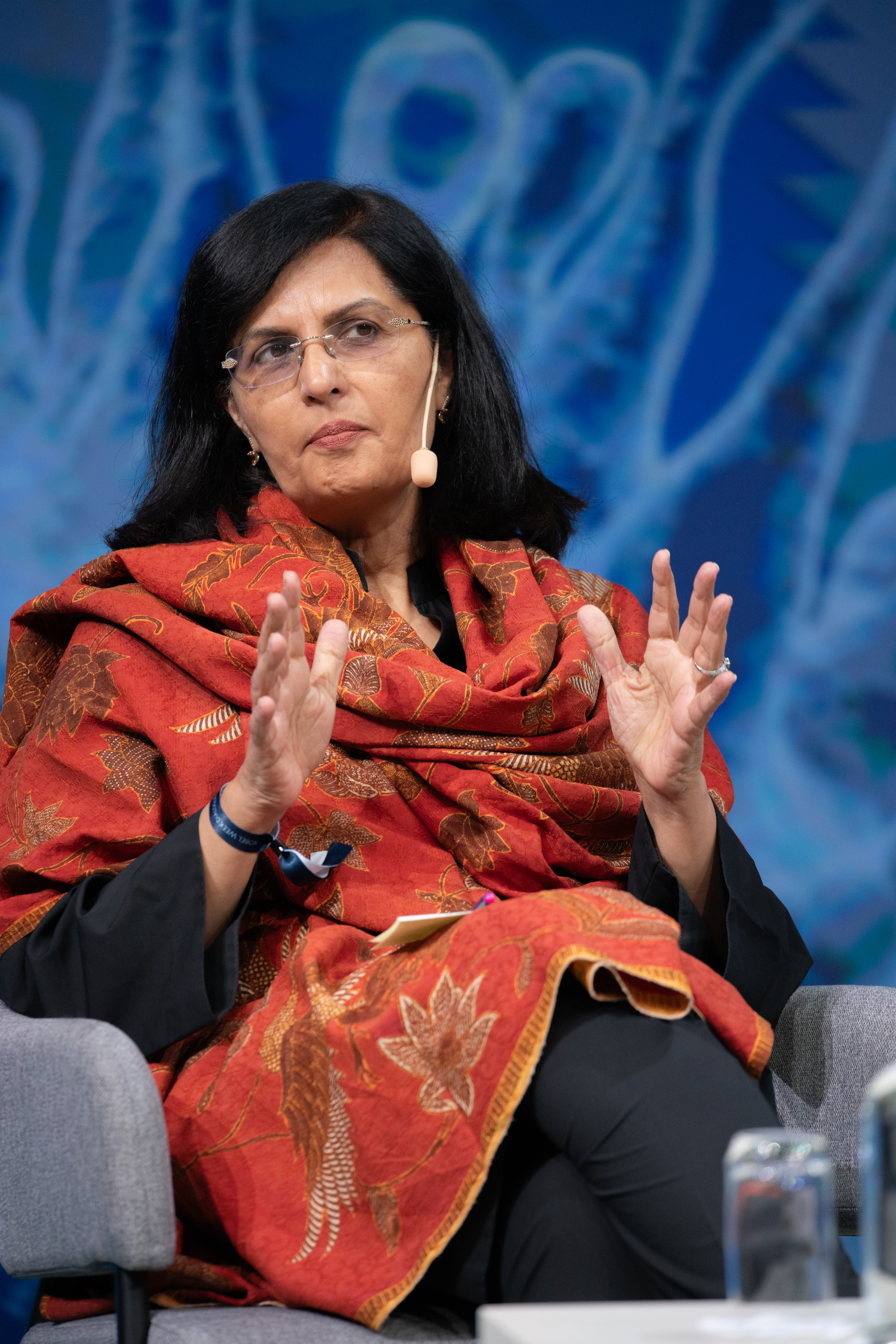
Nishtar speaking at 2024 Nobel Week

Nishtar also previously served on several boards, including:

- EAT Foundation, Member of the Advisory Board
- Gavi, the Vaccine Alliance, member of the board (2015–2016), previously Chairwoman of the Evaluation Advisory Committee
- International Union for Health Promotion, Member of the Board
- World Heart Federation (WHF), member of the board
- WHF Foundation, chairwoman of the advisory board (2003–2006)

Nishtar chaired the World Heart Day campaign in its founding years, the 'Go Red for Women' campaign in 2004, and the Expert Panel on Women and Heart Disease 2007 onwards. She also previously served as member of the Ministerial Leadership Initiative for Global Health, and was a member of the Working Group on Private Sector in Health Systems set up by Results for Development and the Rockefeller Foundation.

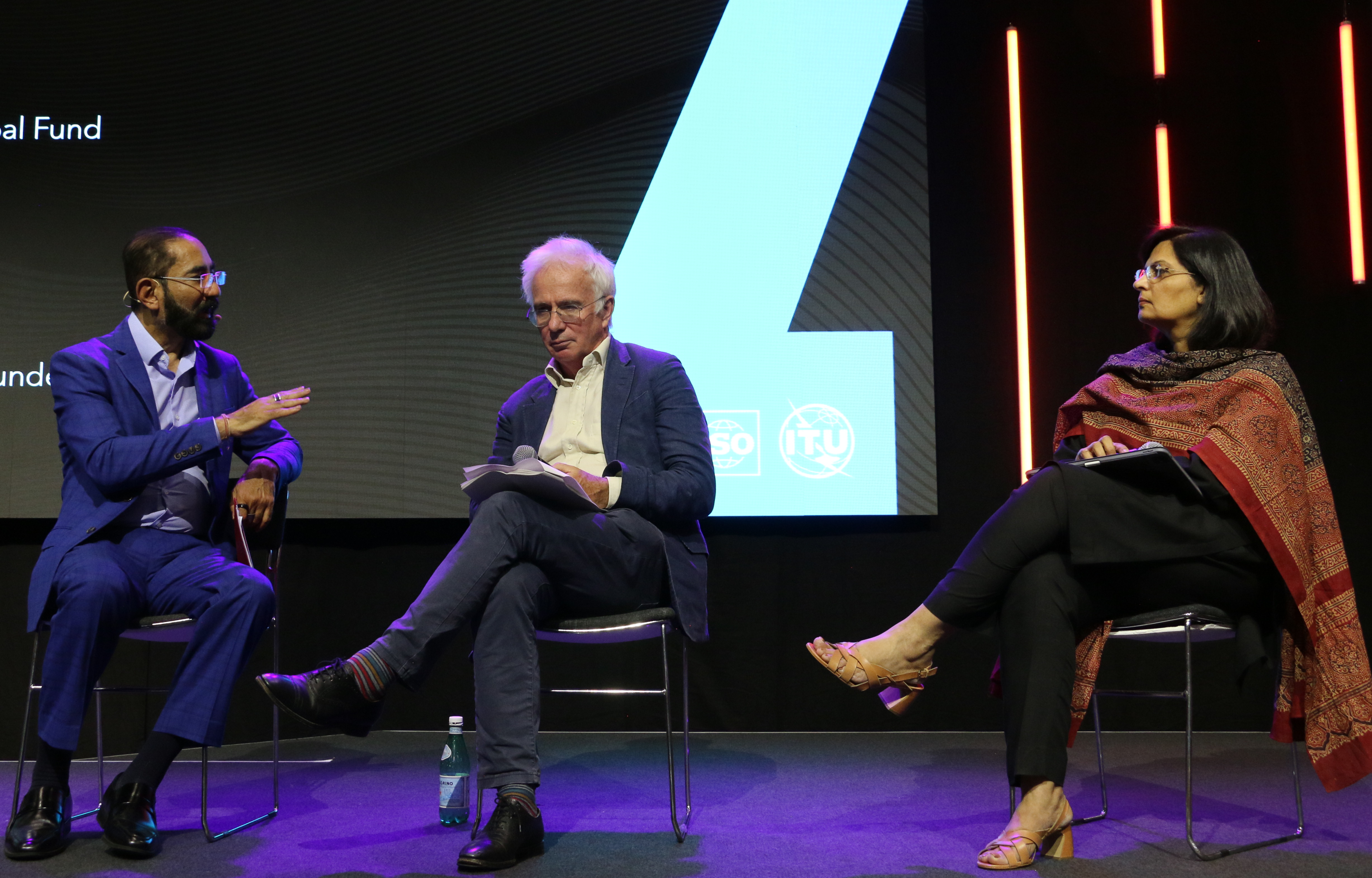
Sanjay Puri, Peter Sands, Nishtar at AI for Good (2025)

Nishtar has been involved in several global health declarations. She was a member of the drafting committee of the Moscow Declaration on NCDs in 2011. She chaired the drafting committee of WHO's Venice Statement on Global Health Initiatives and Health Systems in 2009. She was also a member of the International Advisory Boards of the Osaka Declaration and Victoria Declaration on Cardiovascular diseases.

Nishtar is a regular plenary speaker or keynote speaker at international meetings, and speaks at forums such as the World Economic Forum in Davos. She has also been invited as a thought leader at UN agencies. She has also been on the organising committees of many international conferences.

== Publications ==
Nishtar's book Choked Pipes was published by the Oxford University Press in 2010. The book received reviews in The Lancet, the WHO Bulletin and other periodicals, and was released in several cities. She has also authored the book Chapters, and is a regular op-ed contributor to The News International and the Huffington Post. She has also contributed in The Wall Street Journal and Project Syndicate. She was also editor of the Pakistan Lancet Series, released in 2013.

=== Books and book chapters ===
- Nishtar, Sania (29 May 2015). "68". In Frenk, Julio; Hoffman, Steven (eds.). To Save Humanity. US: Oxford University Press. ISBN 978-0-19-022154-6.
- Nishtar, Sania (2010). Choked Pipes: Reforming Pakistan's Mixed Health System. Oxford University Press. ISBN 978-0-19-547969-0.
- Ralston, Johanna; Nishtar, Sania (2013). "NCDS and Civil Society: A History and a Roadmap". Global Handbook on Noncommunicable Diseases and Health Promotion. pp. 411–415. doi:10.1007/978-1-4614-7594-1_27. ISBN 978-1-4614-7593-4.
- Nishtar S. Prevention of Coronary Heart Disease in South Asia. Heartfile and SAARC Cardiac Society. ISBN 969-8651-00-4. Islamabad, Pakistan.
- Nishtar S. Public-Private Partnerships in the health sector – a call to action. The Commonwealth Health Ministers Book; 2007.

== Awards ==
Nishtar is the recipient of Pakistan's Sitara-i-Imtiaz (Star of Excellence) Award (awarded by the President of Pakistan), the European Societies Population Science Award, and the First Global Innovation Award by the Rockefeller Foundation. She was admitted to the Medical Mission Hall of Fame in Toledo, Ohio in 2011.

In the beginning of 2014, Nishtar was mentioned in the Top-20 List of 'Most Influential Women in Science in the Islamic World' by the Muslim Scientists List in recognition of her policy advocacy contributions.

In 2019, her alma mater Kings College awarded Nishtar a doctorate in science, honoris causa. Nishtar was on the list of the BBC's 100 Women announced on 23 November 2020.

Political offices
Preceded by Makhdoom Shahabuddin	Minister for Health; 2013	Succeeded by Saira Afzal Tarar
Preceded by Sheikh Waqas Akram	Minister for Education and Training; 2013	Succeeded by Muhammad Baligh Ur Rehman
Preceded by Changez Khan Jamali	Minister for Science and Technology; 2013	Succeeded by Zahid Hamid
Preceded by Raja Pervaiz Ashraf	Minister for Information Technology and Telecom; 2013	Succeeded by Anusha Rahman
