= 2024–2025 PTI–government negotiations =

Political event in Pakistan

2024–2025 PTI–Government Negotiations
- Date: December 2024 – January 2025
- Location: Pakistan
- Type: Political negotiations
- Theme: Resolution of political deadlock post-Imran Khan's ousting
- Cause: Escalation of political crisis after the 2022 no-confidence vote
- Motive: Formation of judicial commissions; Release of political prisoners; Halt to military trials of PTI workers
- Organized by: National Assembly Speaker Ayaz Sadiq
- Participants: Pakistan Tehreek-e-Insaf; Barrister Gohar Ali Khan; Zartaj Gul; PML-N-led Government; Prime Minister Shehbaz Sharif; Deputy Prime Minister Ishaq Dar
- Outcome: Collapse of negotiations; Renewed protests and political tensions

2024–2025 PTI–government negotiations, was the negotiations between Pakistan Tehreek-e-Insaf (PTI) and the Pakistan Muslim League-Nawaz (PML-N)-led government, held from December 2024 to January 2025, aimed to resolve the political deadlock that had persisted since the ousting of PTI founder Imran Khan in April 2022. The talks, facilitated by National Assembly Speaker Ayaz Sadiq, sought to address key demands from PTI, including the formation of judicial commissions and the release of political prisoners. Despite initial optimism, the negotiations ultimately collapsed, leading to renewed political tensions and protests.

== Background ==
The political crisis in Pakistan escalated after Imran Khan’s government was removed through a parliamentary vote of no confidence in April 2022. Following his imprisonment in August 2023 on corruption charges, PTI launched nationwide protests, including the violent 9 May 2023, demonstrations and the 26 November 2024, Islamabad march. These events resulted in thousands of arrests and military trials for PTI workers.

In December 2024, PTI announced a civil disobedience movement, demanding the release of political prisoners and the formation of judicial commissions to investigate the May 9 riots and the November 26 crackdown. In response, Prime Minister Shehbaz Sharif formed a government negotiation committee, and talks began on 23 December 2024.

== Key demands ==
PTI’s primary demands included:

- The formation of judicial commissions to investigate the May 9 riots, and 26 November 2024, events.
- The release of political prisoners, including Imran Khan.
- A halt to military trials of PTI workers.

The government, while open to dialogue, insisted on addressing these demands through legal and constitutional frameworks, emphasizing the need for gradual progress.

== Negotiation process ==
The negotiations consisted of four rounds:

1. First Round (23 December 2024): Both sides agreed to continue talks, with PTI promising to present a written charter of demands by 2 January 2025.
2. Second Round (2 January 2025): PTI submitted its demands, including the release of prisoners and the formation of judicial commissions. The government agreed to consider these demands but requested time for consultations.
3. Third Round (16 January 2025): PTI reiterated its demands, but the government failed to commit to forming judicial commissions, leading to growing frustration within PTI.
4. Fourth Round (28 January 2025): PTI boycotted the meeting, citing the government’s failure to meet its demands. The government expressed disappointment but kept its negotiation committee intact, hoping for a resumption of talks.

== Collapse of talks ==
On 23 January 2025, PTI announced its withdrawal from negotiations, accusing the government of delaying tactics and insincerity. PTI Chairman Barrister Gohar Ali Khan stated that the government had ignored their demands, particularly the formation of judicial commissions. The government, however, maintained that it had not rejected PTI’s demands and was still consulting coalition partners. Deputy Prime Minister Ishaq Dar expressed surprise at PTI’s decision, calling it a “bolt out of nowhere”.

== Aftermath ==
Following the collapse of talks, PTI announced plans to resume street protests and observe 8 February 2025, as a “Black Day” to mark alleged rigging in the 2024 general elections. Senior PTI leader Zartaj Gul accused the government of misinterpreting PTI’s willingness to negotiate as a sign of weakness.

The government, meanwhile, warned against violent protests and emphasized its readiness to respond to any unconstitutional actions. Analysts noted that the failure of negotiations could further destabilize Pakistan’s political landscape, especially with the Champions Trophy cricket tournament in February 2025.

=== Government’s renewed invitation ===
On 7 February 2025, National Assembly Speaker Ayaz Sadiq reiterated the government’s openness to talks, emphasizing that the negotiation committee remains intact and communication channels with PTI are still active.

Prime Minister Shehbaz Sharif urged PTI to return to the negotiating table through a parliamentary committee, framing dialogue as essential for national stability. PTI leaders, including Barrister Gohar Ali Khan and Omar Ayub, rejected the offer, labeling it a "delaying tactic" and reiterating demands for judicial commissions and prisoner releases as non-negotiable prerequisites.

However, PTI softened its protest plans for February 8—originally declared a "Black Day"—by limiting demonstrations to Swabi and southern Punjab, avoiding a direct confrontation in Islamabad.

== Analysis and criticism ==
Political analysts criticized PTI’s abrupt withdrawal from talks, arguing that it missed an opportunity to pressure the government into meeting its demands. Asma Shirazi, a political commentator, described PTI’s decision as “incomprehensible,” suggesting that the party could have gained moral high ground by exhausting all options.

On the other hand, PTI leaders accused the government of using the talks as a delaying tactic. Barrister Gohar Ali Khan stated that the government’s reluctance to form judicial commissions demonstrated its lack of seriousness.

Punjab Information Minister Azma Bukhari accused PTI of seeking "anarchy" and criticized Imran Khan’s leadership for destabilizing negotiations.

Senator Irfan Siddiqui (government negotiator) argued that PTI’s abrupt withdrawal from talks demonstrated a "non-democratic mentality" and squandered opportunities for progress.
