= Pakistan Democratic Movement =

Coalition of Pakistani political parties (2020–2023)

Pakistan Democratic Movement پاکستان ڈیموکریٹک موومنٹ
- Abbreviation: PDM
- President: Fazal-ur-Rehman (JUI–F)
- Secretary-General: Shahid Khaqan Abbasi (PML–N)
- Spokesperson: Hafiz Hamdullah Saboor (JUI–F)
- Senior Vice President: Aftab Ahmad Khan Sherpao (QWP)
- Vice President: Mahmood Khan Achakzai (PMAP)
- Founded: 20 September 2020; 5 years ago
- Dissolved: c. 20 September 2023; 2 years ago
- Ideology: Anti-PTI
- Political position: Big tent

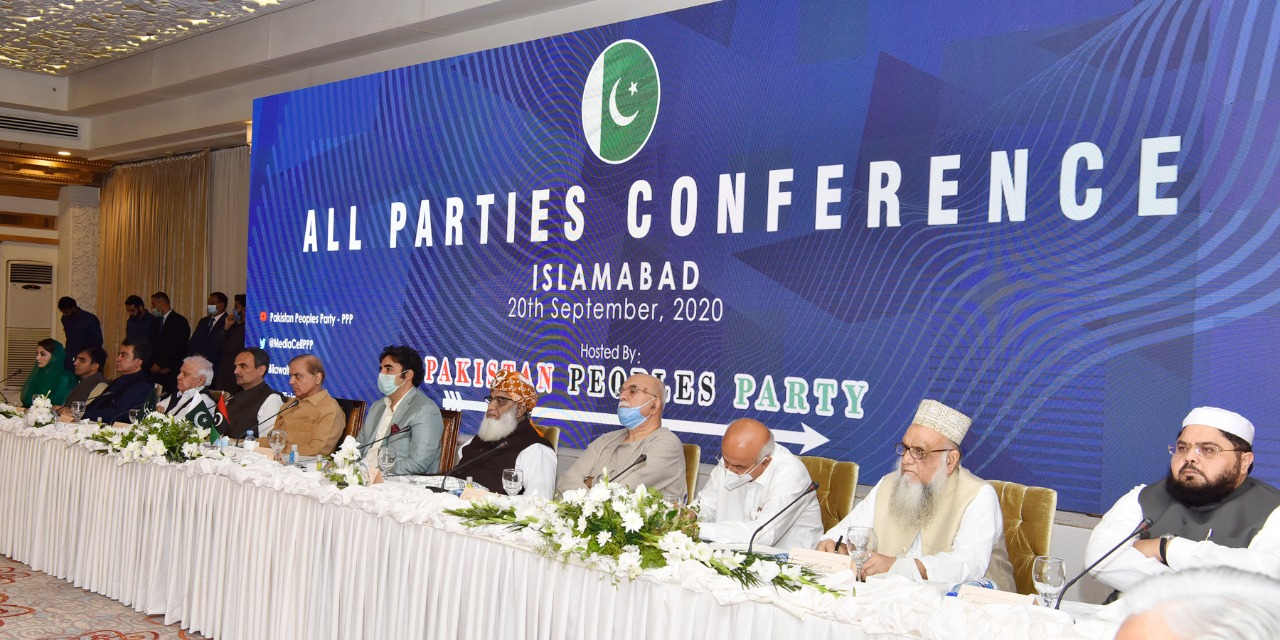
All Parties Conference on 20 September 2020 in which PDM was founded

The Pakistan Democratic Movement (PDM; Urdu: پاکستان ڈیموکریٹک موومنٹ) was a coalition of Pakistani political parties that was founded in September 2020 as a political movement opposing Pakistani prime minister Imran Khan, who had taken office in August 2018. It consisted of parties that have been historically prominent in Pakistani politics, such as the Pakistan People's Party (PPP) and the Pakistan Muslim League (PML–N), while also including dissident members of Khan's own Pakistan Tehreek-e-Insaf (PTI). The PDM sought to shift the balance of power in the democratic process to bring down the Khan government, which it accused of poor governance, suppression or harassment of political opponents, and mismanagement of the country's economy and foreign policy.

In 2021, Pakistan fell into an economic crisis, which intensified debate over Khan's premiership. By early 2022, the PDM began pushing for a no-confidence motion against Khan, sparking a constitutional crisis; Khan was ousted when the motion proceeded on 10 April of that year and passed by majority vote in the National Assembly. Upon being succeeded by PML–N's Shehbaz Sharif on 11 April, Khan claimed that the United States had worked with the Pakistan Armed Forces to artificially prop up the Sharif government through the PDM and that he would be staging the Azadi march in May and the Haqeeqi Azadi march in October to demand early elections.

Following his removal as prime minister, Khan's denunciation of the PDM and the Sharif government was met with widespread support within his party and among his voter base throughout the country, exacerbating the ongoing Pakistani political crisis. During the Haqeeqi Azadi march in Wazirabad, Khan suffered non-fatal gunshot wounds in an attempted assassination, subsequently stating that he had been "receiving information" that the two gunmen had acted at the PDM's behest. In May 2023, amidst country-wide PTI protests, Khan was arrested on corruption charges, sparking the May 9 riots against government and military institutions. While he was granted bail one day later, he was re-arrested in August 2023 and charged with selling state gifts, culminating in his ongoing imprisonment. Later that year, in anticipation of the 2024 Pakistani general election, the PDM was effectively dissolved and has not held any formal meetings.

The PDM's president and spokesperson was Fazal-ur-Rehman and Hafiz Hamdullah Saboor, respectively, both of Jamiat Ulema-e-Islam (JUI–F). Shahid Khaqan Abbasi of the PML–N was secretary-general, Aftab Ahmad Khan Sherpao of the Qaumi Watan Party (QWP) was senior vice president, and Mahmood Khan Achakzai of the Pashtunkhwa Milli Awami Party (PMAP) was vice president. The coalition's former senior vice president and former spokesperson was Raja Pervez Ashraf of the PPP and Mian Iftikhar Hussain of the Awami National Party (ANP), respectively.

== Background ==
The PDM was a political movement that was based on allegations of vote rigging in the 2018 Pakistani general election, which was won by Imran Khan's Pakistan Tehreek-e-Insaf in a landslide. The PDM accused Khan of mismanaging the economy, which had resulted in increased inflation, and that the resultant price hikes had affected the lives of common Pakistanis. PDM leaders also claimed that Qamar Javed Bajwa, the Pakistan Army Chief, and Faiz Hameed, head of the intelligence services (ISI), had been responsible for "selecting" Imran Khan as Prime Minister.

However, Khan's government maintained that the movement was motivated by a series of corruption cases against the leaders of the political parties that had previously governed Pakistan, namely the Pakistan Muslim League (PMLN) and the Pakistan Peoples Party (PPP). Moreover, according to Khan, the opposition never appealed to the legal bodies to contest the elections, as his party PTI had in aftermath of the 2013 general elections. He repeatedly claimed that the opposition was demanding amnesty under the National Reconciliation Ordinance (NRO), despite the opposition's statements that they did not desire NROs.

=== Formation ===
On 20 September 2020, Bilawal Bhutto Zardari, chairman of the center-left Pakistan Peoples Party, hosted an "all parties conference" at the Islamabad Marriott Hotel to form a grand political alliance and plan strategy for replacing the PTI government. Fazal-ur-Rehman, a harsh critic of the military establishment, read out the 26-point resolution adopted by the attendees.

=== Protests ===
On 16 October 2020, PDM held its first political gathering in Gujranwala. Protests organised by the PDM in October 2020 drew over 50,000 people. The government has remained critical and dismissive of the rallies. The PDM planned to hold a "long march" in June 2021, despite objections of large gatherings by health experts, due to the COVID-19 pandemic in Pakistan.

=== Resignations ===
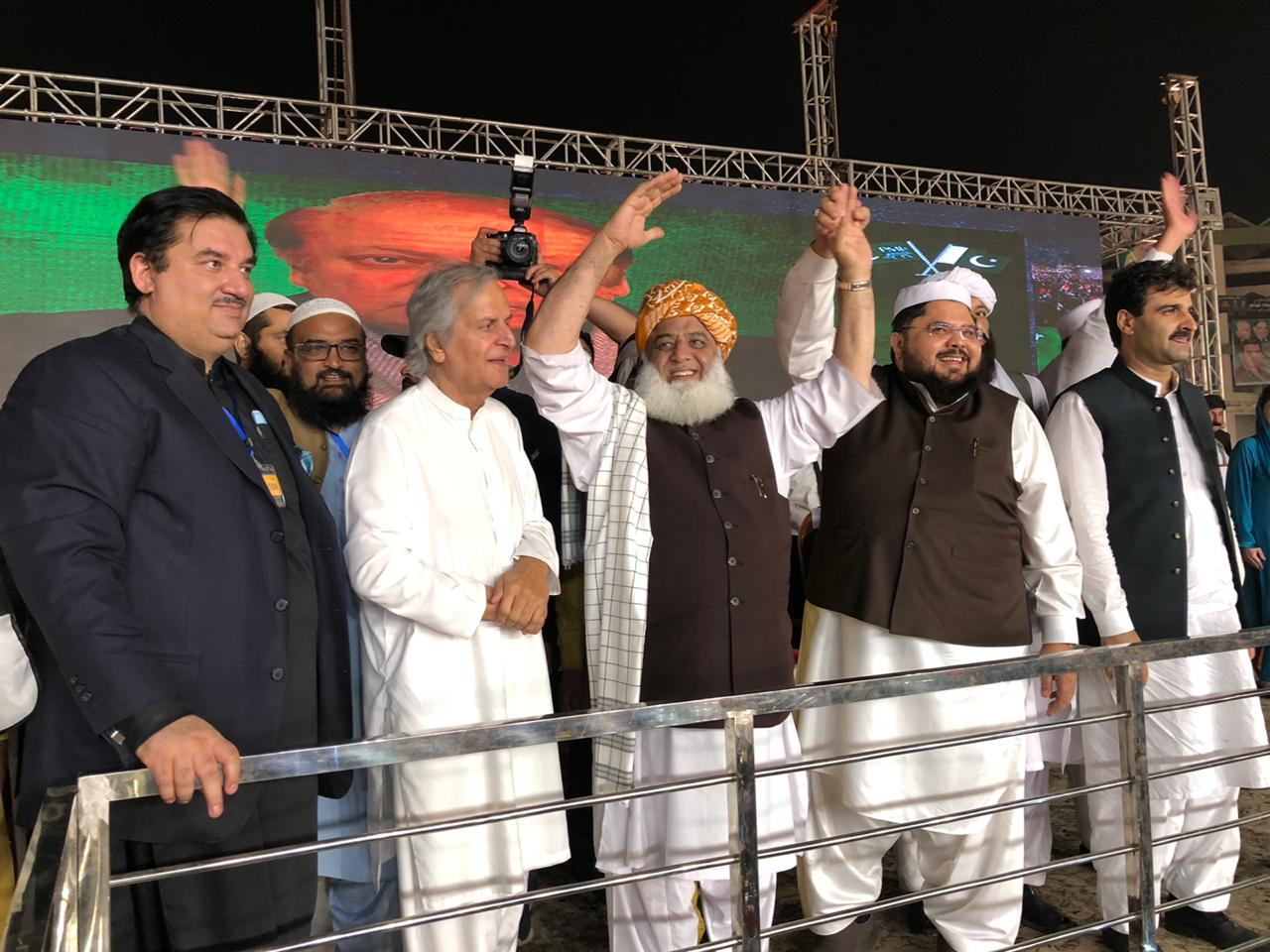
PDM leadership onstage at its inaugural gathering in Gujranwala on 16 October 2020

In December 2020, due to disagreements with Fazl-ur-Rehman's leadership, Muhammad Khan Sherani and other senior members of the JUI broke away and formed their own political party called the Jamiat-Ulema-i-Islam Pakistan, claiming that Fazl had personalized the party and used it for his own needs, dismissing the needs of the party itself.

In April 2021, the Pakistan Democratic Movement issued show-cause notices to the Pakistan Peoples Party (PPP) and the Awami National Party (ANP). Later on, the ANP withdrew from the PDM, saying that the movement was "hijacked" by some parties. After a show-cause notice was issued to the PPP, it resigned from the Pakistan Democratic Movement and gave up all offices in the movement along with the ANP.

=== Coming to power ===
The major success of PDM came after reportedly 20 plus members of Pakistan Tehreek-e-Insaf appeared on the surface in Sindh house on 17 March 2022. Pakistan Tehreek-e-Insaf claimed that these MNAs are bribed and have violated article. However, PDM refused these claimed and termed decision of dissent members as their own choice. Nevertheless, dissent members allowed PDM to negotiate with government-allied parties Muttahida Qaumi Movement – Pakistan and Balochistan Awami Party proving to them that the government has gone weak and PDM already has a reasonable number to win the no-confidence motion. Ahead of the vote motion Balochistan Awami Party and Muttahida Qaumi Movement – Pakistan joined the opposition alliance on 29 and 30 March respectively. As a result of opposition alliance won the vote of no confidence with 174 votes without using dissent members and saving article 63(A) against them. The tenure of Imran Khan as prime minister ended on 9 April 2022, while Shehbaz Sharif was elected as prime minister of Pakistan by the national assembly of Pakistan.

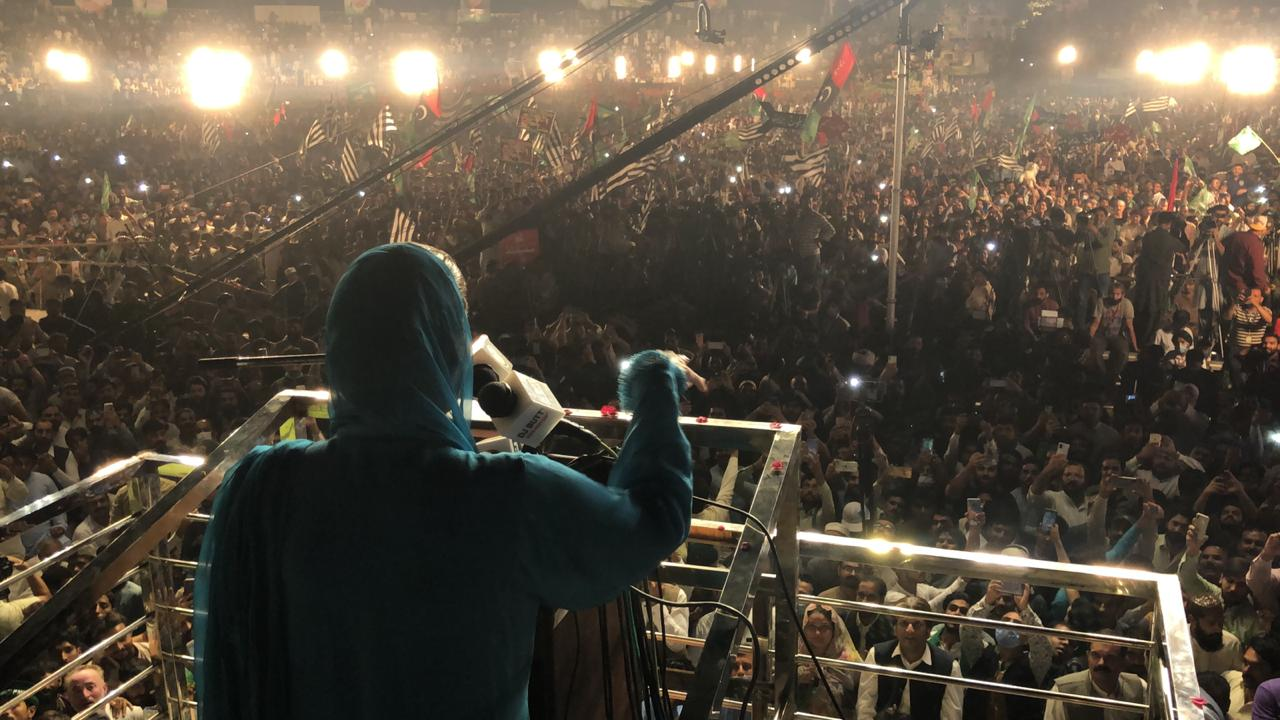
PDM Gujranwala Maryam

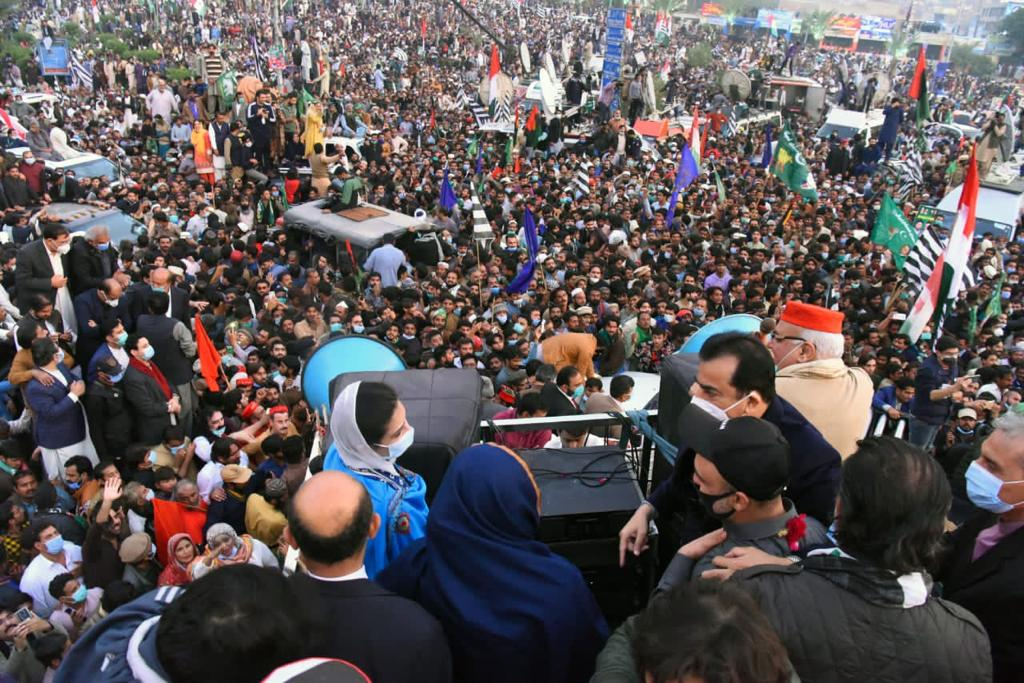
PDM Multan Asifa Bhutto-Zardari

== Parties ==
Name		National Leader	Main ideology
BAP	Balochistan Awami Party بلوچستان عوامی پارٹی	Khalid Hussain Magsi	Social democracy
MQM-P	Muttahida Qaumi Movement – Pakistan متحدہ قومی موومنٹ پاکستان	Khalid Maqbool Siddiqui	Muhajir nationalism
PPP	Pakistan People's Party پاکستان پیپلز پارٹی	Bilawal Bhutto Zardari	Third Way
NDM	National Democratic Movement نیشنل ڈیموکریٹک موومنٹ	Mohsin Dawar	Pashtun nationalism
PML(Q)	Pakistan Muslim League (Q) پاکستان مسلم لیگ (ق)	Shujaat Hussain	Conservatism
BNP(M)	Balochistan National Party (Mengal) بلوچستان نيشنل پارٹی مینگل	Akhtar Mengal	Baloch nationalism
JAH	Jamiat Ahle Hadith جمیعت اہلِ حدیث	Sajid Mir	Ahl-i Hadith
JUI(F)	Jamiat Ulama-e-Islam جمیعت علمائے اسلام (فضل)	Fazal-ur-Rehman	Islamism
JUP	Jamiat Ulema-e-Pakistan آجميعت علماء پاکستان	Shah Owais Noorani	Islamism
NP(B)	National Party (Bizenjo) قومی پارٹی بزنجو	Abdul Malik Baloch	Social democracy
PML(N)	Pakistan Muslim League (Nawaz) پاکستان مسلم لیگ (نواز)	Nawaz Sharif	Conservatism
PMAP	Pashtunkhwa Milli Awami Party پشتونخوا ملی عوامی پارٹی	Mahmood Khan Achakzai	Pashtun nationalism
QWP	Qaumi Watan Party قومی وطن پارٹی	Aftab Ahmad Sherpao	Social democracy
JWP	Jamhoori Wattan Party جمہوری وطن پارٹی	Shahzain Bugti	Republicanism
ANP	Awami National Party عوامی نيشنل پارٹی	Aimal Wali Khan	Pashtun nationalism

== Senior leadership ==
Name	Office	Party
Fazal-ur-Rehman	President	Jamiat Ulama-e-Islam
Shahid Khaqan Abbasi	Secretary-General	Pakistan Muslim League (N)
Mahmood Khan Achakzai	Vice President	Pakhtunkhwa Milli Awami Party
Aftab Sherpao	Senior Vice President	Qaumi Watan Party
Hafiz Hamdullah	Spokesperson	Jamiat Ulama-e-Islam
Sajid Mir	Member	Jamiat Ahle Hadith
Akhtar Mengal	Member	Balochistan National Party (Mengal)
Nawaz Sharif	Member	Pakistan Muslim League (N)
Shehbaz Sharif	Member	Pakistan Muslim League (N)
Maryam Nawaz	Member	Pakistan Muslim League (N)
Marriyum Aurangzeb	Member	Pakistan Muslim League (N)
Rana Sanaullah	Member	Pakistan Muslim League (N)
Asif Ali Zardari	Former Member	Pakistan Peoples Party
Bilawal Bhutto Zardari	Former Member	Pakistan Peoples Party
Raja Pervaiz Ashraf	Former Senior Vice President	Pakistan Peoples Party
Mian Iftikhar Hussain	Former Spokesperson	Awami National Party

== No-confidence motion against Imran Khan ==
A vote of no-confidence against Imran Khan was held on 9 April 2022 where 174 members voted against him and removed him as prime minister. Consequently Shehbaz Sharif was elected as prime minister of Pakistan.

== See also ==
- 2019 Azadi March
- Pakistan National Alliance
- Movement for the Restoration of Democracy
- Lawyers' Movement
