= Azadi march =

Azadi march may refer to:

- 2014 Azadi march
- 2019 Azadi march
- 2022 Azadi march
- 2022 Azadi March-II
