= Pakistani political crisis (2022–2024) =

Unrest after ousting of Imran Khan's government

Pakistani political unrest (2022–2024)
- Date: 10 April 2022 – 26 November 2024
- Location: Pakistan
- Caused by: 2021–2024 Pakistani economic crisis; 2022 Pakistani constitutional crisis; No-confidence motion against Imran Khan; Attempted assassination of Imran Khan on 3 November 2022; Arrest of Imran Khan in May and August 2023; Imprisonment of Imran Khan since August 2023; Allegations of rigging in the 2024 general election; May 9 riots and November PTI protest
- Status: Imran Khan ousted in 2022 and jailed a year later. Shehbaz Sharif becomes prime minister

Parties
PMLN; PPP; MQM-P; Supported by: PDM: PML(Q); BAP; IPP; PTI-P (until 2024); BNP(M) (until 2024); JWP (until 2024); QWP (until 2024); NDM (until 2024); NP (until 2024)	PTI; SIC; Supported by: TTAP: GDA; MWM; PkMAP; BNP(M); AML; AP; JIP

Lead figures
Shehbaz Sharif; Maryam Nawaz; Asif Ali Zardari; Bilawal Bhutto Zardari; Khalid Maqbool Siddiqui; Syed Mustafa Kamal; Supported by: Nawaz Sharif; Yusuf Raza Gillani; Shujaat Hussain; Khalid Hussain Magsi; Aleem Khan (politician); Pervez Khattak (until 2024); Shahzain Bugti (until 2024); Aftab Ahmad Khan Sherpao (until 2024); Mohsin Dawar (until 2024); Abdul Malik Baloch (until 2024)	Imran Khan; Bushra Bibi; Shah Mahmood Qureshi; Parvez Elahi; Supported by: Sheikh Rasheed Ahmad; Pir of Pagaro VIII; Raja Nasir Abbas; Sahibzada Hamid Raza; Mahmood Khan Achakzai; Akhtar Mengal; Shahid Khaqan Abbasi; Hafiz Naeem ur Rehman

Casualties and losses
2023 Pakistani protests: 190+ policemen injured; Several military installations and cantonments vandalized; Several Public properties and infrastructure were destroyed or damaged; Corps Commander House, Lahore burned down; Peshawar Radio Station burned down	2022 Azadi march: 5 marchers killed; 2023 Imran Khan arrest protests: 8+ protestors killed; 47+ protestors killed (PTI Claim); Many senior leaders arrested; 7000+ protestors arrested

On 10 April 2022, amidst the Pakistani constitutional crisis, the Pakistan Democratic Movement (PDM) successfully spurred the passing of a no-confidence motion against Imran Khan in the National Assembly. The Imran Khan government had taken office on 20 August 2018 and was widely thought to have enjoyed support from Pakistan's military establishment, which has dominated the country's internal and external political affairs since the partition of India. However, this support began dwindling around the time of the beginning of the 2021 economic crisis, which accompanied the COVID-19 pandemic and the Russian invasion of Ukraine. The PDM consisted of parties that were historically prominent in Pakistani politics, such as the Pakistan Muslim League (PML–N) and the Pakistan People's Party (PPP), prior to Khan's founding of Pakistan Tehreek-e-Insaf (PTI) in 1996. In the months preceding his ouster, Khan had urged the Pakistan Armed Forces to prevent the opposition from rising to power, but was ultimately rebuffed. On 11 April 2022, the National Assembly elected PML–N's Shehbaz Sharif as the new Prime Minister of Pakistan and the On 26 February 2024, the Punjab Assembly elected PML–N's Maryam Nawaz Sharif as the new Chief Minister of Punjab and the On 10 March 2024, National Assembly elected PPP's Asif Ali Zardari as the new President of Pakistan.

Upon being removed from his position, Khan claimed that the Shehbaz Sharif government was the product of regime change orchestrated by the United States, and announced the beginning of the Azadi march in May and the Haqeeqi Azadi march in October to demand early elections; Khan was shot and wounded by two gunmen in an assassination attempt against him during the latter march on 3 November 2022. The PTI later dissolved two of its provincial assemblies (Punjab and Khyber Pakhtunkhwa) in an attempt to trigger early elections in 60% of Pakistan due on 30 April 2023 and 28 May 2023, respectively. A Gallup survey conducted during this period revealed that Khan was the most popular political leader in Pakistan, with 61% of polled citizens expressing a positive opinion of him. At the same time, inflation continued to rise in goods and services, reaching a multi-decade high of 35.4%—driven by a weaker Pakistani rupee, pandemic-related supply-chain disruptions, high production costs for farmers, and global energy price hikes.

On 9 May 2023, Khan was arrested by the National Accountability Bureau while in the Islamabad High Court, exacerbating then-ongoing PTI protests by triggering the May 9 riots against government and military institutions, resulting in hundreds of casualties amidst a cellular and internet blackout. Khan was released by an order of the Supreme Court two days later. However, on 5 August 2023, he was again arrested on the charge of selling state gifts and was sentenced to three years jail and five years of disqualification by the trial court judge. On 29 August 2023, the Islamabad High Court suspended Khan's sentence, but he has since been convicted in numerous other cases. Sharif completed his first term in office on 14 August 2023 and was succeeded by a caretaker government under Anwaar-ul-Haq Kakar, who was succeeded by a second Sharif government and second Maryam government on 11 March 2024 to 26 February 2024; Sharif's and Maryam's second term has been subject to controversy due to allegations that the 2024 general election was rigged. As of February 2026, Khan is incarcerated at the Central Jail of Rawalpindi.

== Background ==
=== 2018: Election as prime minister ===
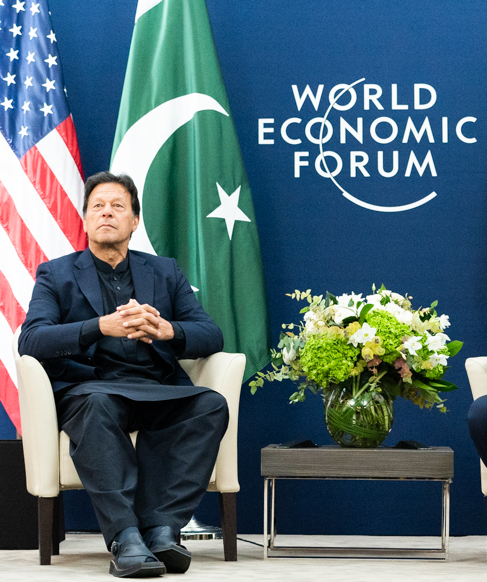
PM Imran Khan, WEF 2020

General election were held in Pakistan on Wednesday, 25 July 2018 to the elect the members of 15th National Assembly and the four Provincial Assemblies. The three major parties Pakistan Tehreek-e-Insaf (PTI) led by Imran Khan, the Pakistan Muslim League (PML–N) led by Shehbaz Sharif and the Pakistan Peoples Party (PPP) led by Bilawal Bhutto.

PTI won the most seats in the National Assembly but fell short of a majority; the party subsequently formed a coalition government with several smaller parties.

Following the elections, six major parties including PML-N claimed there had been large-scale vote rigging and administrative malpractices. Imran Khan, chairman of the PTI, proceeded to form a coalition government, announcing his cabinet shortly after the elections.

Claims of electoral malpractice in the 2018 elections are still hotly debated. Numerous neutral observers have issued statements on the credibility of the result, with a top electoral watchdog, Free and Fair Election Network (FAFEN), saying that the 2018 general elections in Pakistan had been "more transparent in some aspects" than the previous polls. The EU Election Observation Mission to Pakistan maintained, however, that a "level playing field" was not afforded to all parties and that the process was not "as good as that of 2013".

=== Pakistan Democratic Movement (PDM) ===
The PDM is political movement founded in September 2020, which is based on allegations of rigging in the 2018 Pakistani general election, which Imran Khan's Pakistan Tehreek-e-Insaf (PTI) won. Imran Khan's government, however, maintained that the movement was motivated by a series of corruption cases against the leaders of the political parties that had were previously in power, namely the Pakistan Muslim League (PML–N) and the Pakistan People's Party (PPP).

=== Military confrontation ===
The tensions between Khan and the army arose in 2021, when Khan tried to appoint his own choice as the new ISI chief. The army resisted this move, and Khan eventually backed down. However, the tensions continued, and in April 2022, Khan was ousted from power in a no-confidence motion. it is widely believed that the army was responsible behind his removal.

After removal, Imran Khan waged a campaign against the military and held rallies and speeches in which he criticized the army's role in Pakistani politics.

Tension reached a melting point when after he was brazenly arrested from the high court by the paramilitary forces, Pakistan Rangers, which later was termed as illegal by the Supreme court. Following his arrest, Khan's supporters stormed the army headquarters in Rawalpindi and set fire to the house of a senior general. The army responded by cracking down on Khan's supporters, and several PTI leaders were arrested.

Khan's campaign against the military has not been without its challenges. The army has a powerful influence in Pakistani politics, and it has been able to silence Khan's critics. Khan himself has been arrested and detained on several occasions.

Despite the challenges, Khan has shown no signs of backing down from his campaign against the military. He is determined to reduce the military's influence in Pakistani politics, and he believes that this is the only way to ensure that the country becomes more democratic.

== Constitutional crisis: April 2022 ==
=== No-confidence motion against Imran Khan ===
A no-confidence motion was tabled against PM Imran Khan on 28 March 2022. This was followed by parliamentary allies going from the Pakistan Tehreek-e-Insaf (PTI) led government to the Pakistan Muslim League (N) (PML-N) led opposition. First came independent members and the Jamhoori Watan Party, followed by the Balochistan Awami Party (BAP) and defectors from the Pakistan Muslim League (Q) (PML-Q). However, the final death blow to the ruling coalition was the defection of the Muttahida Qaumi Movement – Pakistan. The opposition also claimed it had the support from a group of PTI MNAs led by ex-secretary general of the PTI, Jahangir Tareen. The PTI alleged that this was in violation of article 63(a) of the Pakistani constitution. The voting was scheduled to take place on 3 April. However, the deputy speaker, Qasim Suri, refused to hold the vote, citing a foreign conspiracy against the government, and article 5 of the constitution. This was later ruled unconstitutional by the Supreme Court. Voting finally took place on 9 April, with Imran Khan losing the vote. Shehbaz Sharif was elected Prime Minister of Pakistan two days later, on 11 April. Initially Imran Khan claimed that the United States was behind his ouster, claiming US Assistant Secretary of State Donald Lu threatened his government through a diplomatic cipher. Later in November 2022, in an interview with the Financial Times, Khan said he no longer "blamed" the United States and "[a]s far as I'm concerned it's over, it's behind me". In another interview with the Voice of America, he stated "it wasn't the U.S. who told Pakistan [to oust me]." Khan instead claimed Army Chief Gen Bajwa to be behind his ouster, and that the General had "somehow managed to tell the Americans that I was anti-American."

=== Constitutional crisis in Punjab ===
After years of political pressure, the Chief Minister of Punjab Usman Buzdar resigned. The resignation was accepted by the governor on 1 April 2022. The current speaker, Chaudhry Parvez Elahi, a member of the PML(Q), was nominated by the PML(Q) and PTI for the role of chief minister, while the opposition parties, PML-N and PPP nominated Hamza Shehbaz of the PML(N). Due to the speaker being a contestant in the election, the deputy speaker, Dost Muhammad Mazari of the PTI was in charge of the proceedings. The election, originally scheduled for 16 April was moved ahead to 6 April by the deputy speaker. However, the secretary assembly refused to comply with his orders, and a no-confidence motion was moved against him by his own party.

=== Khyber Pakhtunkhwa and AJK no-confidence motions ===
On 8 April, opposition parties in the Khyber Pakhtunkhwa Assembly filed a no-confidence motion against Khyber Pakhtunkhwa Chief Minister Mahmood Khan. The no-confidence motion was filed by Awami National Party parliamentary leader Sardar Hussain Babak, provincial senior vice president Khush Dil Khan, MPA Shagufta Malik and others from the united opposition in the provincial assembly secretariat. The no-confidence motion has the signatures of more than 20 members.

On 12 April 2022, PTI submitted a motion of no-confidence against their own Azad Kashmir prime minister who was then replaced.

=== Oath crises in National and Punjab assemblies ===
When PML-N leader Shahbaz Sharif was elected prime minister, President Arif Alvi had to take oath from him. However, the president went on leave due to illness. In his absence, Senate Chairman Sadiq Sanjrani administered the oath of office to the new prime minister. On 19 April 2022, Prime Minister Shahbaz Sharif's 34-member cabinet was sworn in, but President Arif Alvi refused again.

A session of the Punjab Assembly was held on 16 April 2022, in which the opposition candidate Hamza Shahbaz was elected the new Chief Minister but he was not able to take the oath of office. Governor of Punjab Omar Sarfaraz Cheema refused to administer the oath to newly elected Chief Minister Hamza Shahbaz. The Supreme Court later declared the election of Hamza Shehbaz as Chief Minister unconstitutional and stated that the deputy speaker’s actions in the election were unconstitutional. The ruling also installed Chaudhry Pervaiz Elahi as the Chief Minister of Punjab.

== Unrest: 2022—2024 ==
=== Post-Vote of no-confidence protests ===
On 10 April 2022 tens of thousands marched in cities across Pakistan, 20,000 PTI supporters rallied in Karachi

PTI supporters protest in London Park, 10 April 2022

PTI supporters protest in Celebration Square, Canada on 10 April 2022

=== 2022 Azadi march ===
The 2022 Azadi March (Urdu: آزادی مارچ, romanized: Āzādī Mārch, lit. 'Freedom March') was a protest march initiated by the Pakistan Tehreek-e-Insaf and Tehreek Tahafuz Ayin party ousted former Pakistani prime minister chairman Imran Khan against the government of his successor, Prime Minister Shehbaz Sharif. On 24 May 2022, Khan announced a long march towards Islamabad starting on 25 May 2022. Khan led the march from Peshawar, the capital of Khyber Pakhtunkhwa, where his provincial government helped him. Senior PTI members lead the march from Lahore, the capital of Punjab.

Hundreds of potential marchers were arrested in an alleged crackdown by the new Government of Pakistan. To prevent protesters from reaching the Srinagar Highway, Red Zone (Islamabad) and entering the capital, hundreds of containers were given to the Islamabad Police and a ban was placed on gatherings. The entrance towards the D-Chowk (Islamabad) was blocked by hundreds of personnel from the Capital Territory Police not allowing protesters to come close by launching tear gas shells at the protesters.

After dawn on 26 May, Imran Khan called off the March on Blue Area just 2.1 miles away from where the police stood firing tear gas shells. In a later interview his justification for calling off the march was to avoid bloodshed, as he alleged that his supporters were ready to fight against the police. The government maintained that Khan called off the march owing to a lack of political support.

=== Punjab by-elections ===
After the floor crossing, the Election Commission of Pakistan (ECP) de-seated 25 dissident PTI MPAs for defection in the light of Article 63-A of the Constitution of the Islamic Republic of Pakistan on 20 May 2022. Five of these MPAs were elected on reserved seats (3 for women and two for minorities) and new PTI MPAs were notified on these seats on 7 July.

The ECP announced on 25 May 2022 that the by-elections would be held on 17 July 2022. The government held 177 seats in the assembly. This included 165 PML(N) MPAs, 7 PPP MPAs, 1 PRHP MPA, and 4 independent MPAs. Therefore, they needed to win 9 seats to gain a majority in the assembly. On the other hand, the opposition held 173 seats. This included 163 PTI MPAs and 10 PML(Q) MPAs. Therefore, they needed to win 13 seats to gain a majority in the assembly.

By-elections were held in Punjab, Pakistan on 17 July 2022 to elect 20 members of the Provincial Assembly of the Punjab. The Pakistan Tehreek-e-Insaf won a landslide victory on 15 of those 20 seats, leading to the collapse of Chief Minister Hamza Shahbaz's PML(N)-led coalition government.

=== Haqeeqi Azadi march ===
The 2022–23 Azadi March II (Urdu: حقیقی آزادی مارچ, romanized: Haqiqi Azadi March) was a continuation of the 2022 Azadi March I led by the former prime minister of Pakistan Imran Khan from Lahore to Islamabad against the Shehbaz Sharif ministry's refusal to announce early general elections and the appointment of a new Pakistan Army Chief.

==== Imran Khan assassination attempt ====
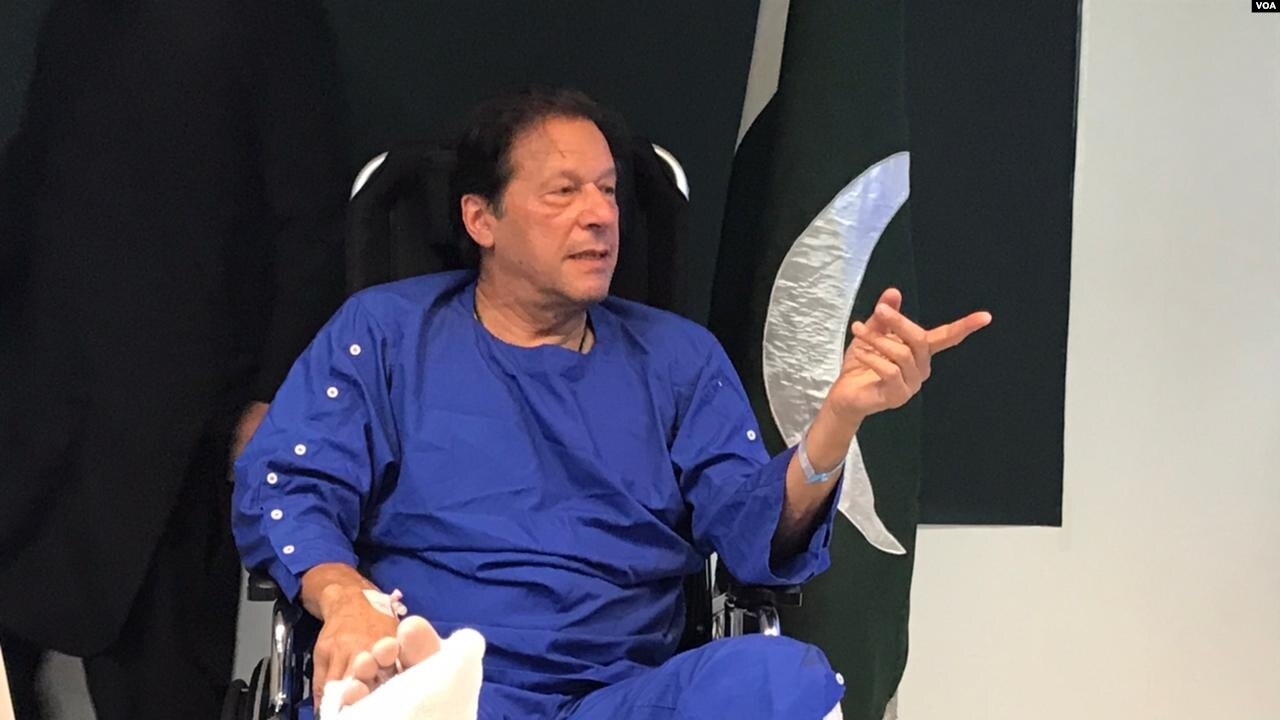
Imran Khan's injuries after assassination attempt.

On 3 November during a political rally near the town of Gujranwala, 2022 former prime minister of Pakistan Imran Khan was engaged in an assassination attempt, but survived the shooting. The march to the Capital as it was called was an important rally for Khan's attempt to undo his removal from office. A senior leader Asad Umar stated, "Yes, he has been shot, there are pellets lodged in his leg, his bone has been chipped, he has also been shot in his thigh.

=== KP and Punjab assembly dissolution ===
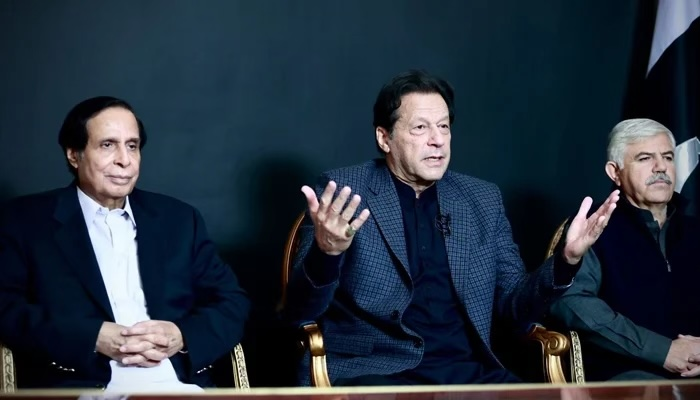
Imran announcing dissolution of KPK and Punjab assemblies with then chief ministers Parvez Elahi and Mahmood Khan in December 2022

Khan-led PTI has dissolved two of its provincial assemblies (Punjab and KP) triggering elections in 60% of country due on 30 April 2023 and 28 May 2023 respectively.

=== Supreme Court verdict ===
Punjab elections due on 30 April 2023 was moved to 8 October 2023 by the Election Commission of Pakistan on the basis of security and economical hurdles which was direct violation of 1973's constitution of Pakistan which directs caretaker government to conduct elections in no more than 90 days. On 4 April 2023, the Supreme Court declared the country's poll panel's decision to delay the assembly elections in two provinces as "unconstitutional". The top court on Tuesday ordered the government to hold snap polls in the country's most populous province of Punjab on 14 May.

=== First arrest of Imran Khan and protests ===
On 9 May, Imran Khan was placed under arrest by police. Protests and injuries were reported at several locations across Pakistan. On the same day social media was heavily restricted.

On 11 May the Supreme Court of Pakistan deemed the arrest of Imran Khan as unlawful and ordered the Pakistani authorities to release him. However, many senior leaders of the PTI remain in police custody.

=== Conviction and second arrest of Imran Khan ===
On 5 August 2023, Khan was arrested for the second time for allegedly selling state gifts. Session court judge has barred Imran Khan from contesting the elections for the time period of five years and sentenced him to three years in Prison. On 29 August 2023, a Pakistani appeals court overturned the decision and granted bail.

=== November 2024 protest ===
From 24–27 November 2024, PTI organized the Final Call protest, led by Bushra Bibi and Ali Amin Gandapur. During the protest, supporters of Imran Khan clashed with police in Islamabad as their march to the capital was obstructed. At least six people, including four security personnel, were killed when a vehicle rammed into them on 26 November. Meanwhile, several were injured during crowd containment via tear gas and rubber bullets, while some journalists were attacked by Khan's supporters. Late at night, Interior Minister Mohsin Naqvi warned that security forces would retaliate with live ammunition.

In response to the clashes, on 27 November, a violent crackdown by Pakistani security forces, led by Naqvi, resulted in casualties. The government denied using live rounds, asserting that the situation was under control after clearing the protest area. According to anonymous sources in local hospitals speaking to The Guardian, the families of the deceased speaking to Al Jazeera, government officials had confiscated records of dead and injured. The PTI described the incident as a "massacre", claiming that hundreds of its members were killed as police fired live ammunition during the final phase of the protest. Later, party sources stated that up to 20 of their workers had been killed, while the search for other victims was ongoing. Government ministers denied any fatalities among PTI protesters during the November 26 security forces raid in Islamabad, with interior minister Naqvi refuting these claims as "propaganda" and challenging the party to provide names of the deceased. Meanwhile, Islamabad's police chief reported five security personnel killed during the clashes and described significant damage caused by protesters. Al Jazeera revealed the names of the deceased and contacted the family members of several of the killed PTI protesters.

Public hospitals in the federal capital asserted that no bodies were brought in following the operation. However, documentary evidence contradicts these claims. On November 30, Geo TV Fact Check contacted over a dozen doctors, nurses, and hospital administrators, many of whom either denied the deaths or declined to comment, citing pressure from government authorities. According to the fact check, three individuals with gunshot wounds were brought to hospitals. One was admitted to PIMS Hospital on November 26 at 8:17 PM and pronounced dead at 8:30 PM. Another was pronounced dead at the Federal Government Poly Clinic Hospital at 5:12 PM the same day, while the third was pronounced dead at 5:00 PM. The security forces' crackdown began in the early hours of 27 November 2024.

PTI shared a post on its official X account stating "In view of the government's brutality and the government's plan to turn the capital into a slaughterhouse for unarmed citizens, (we) announce the suspension of the peaceful protest for the time being."

== See also ==
- 2022 Pakistani constitutional crisis
- 2025 political crisis in Khyber Pakhtunkhwa
- 2022–2023 Pakistani economic crisis
- 2023 Imran Khan arrest protests
- Punjab constitutional crisis (2022)
