= 2022 Azadi march =

March Against Sharif Government

- Part of 2022–2024 Pakistan political unrest
- Date: 25 May 2022 – 26 May 2022
- Location: Islamabad and Lahore, Srinagar Highway
- Caused by: Khan's accusation on the government of US regime change (not proven)
- Goals: Overthrow of the Sharif government; Dissolution of the National Assembly; A snap election
- Methods: Protesters: Sit-ins and Protests; Government: Traffic blockage in Punjab, Khyber Pakhtunkhwa, and Islamabad; Tear gas shelling and Lathi charge
- Status: PTI Failure: Imran Khan calls off the march after one day.

Parties
First Shehbaz Sharif ministry; Supported by: PDM; MQM-P; PSP	PTI; Supported by: AML; PML(Q); MWM; GDA; TLP

Lead figures
Shehbaz Sharif (PMLN); Rana Sanaullah (PMLN); Hamza Shahbaz (PMLN); Supported by: Bilawal Bhutto Zardari (PPP); Mahmood Khan Achakzai (PkMAP); Fazal-ur-Rehman (JUI (F)); Khalid Maqbool Siddiqui (MQM-P)	Imran Khan (PTI): Fawad Chaudhry (PTI); Shah Mahmood Qureshi (PTI); Supported by: Shaikh Rasheed Ahmad (AML); Chaudhry Shujaat Hussain (PML(Q)); Raja Nasir Abbas Jafri (MWM); Pir Pagaro (GDA)

The 2022 Azadi march (Urdu: آزادی مارچ, lit. 'Freedom March') was a one-day protest from 25 May to 26 May 2022, initiated by the former prime minister Imran Khan and his party Pakistan Tehreek-e-Insaf (PTI) against the government of his successor, Shehbaz Sharif. Khan announced a long march towards Islamabad starting on 25 May 2022. The next day Imran Khan called off protests.

Khan led the march into Islamabad, while senior PTI members led the march from Lahore, Punjab. No PTI rallies were held in Sindh and Balochistan due to party instructions. Khan called on his supporters to reach Srinagar Highway in Islamabad to support his demands for early elections. PTI planned to hold a sit-in at D-Chowk, Islamabad until the date for the dissolution of assemblies and new general elections were announced.

== Background ==
In April 2022, Imran Khan was ousted as prime minister by a successful no-confidence motion, which he claimed to be a regime change conspiracy initiated by the United States. It came after tensions arose between Khan and the country's armed forces, including a civil-military controversy over the appointment of a new Director-General of Inter-Services Intelligence (DG-ISI). After the end of his premiership, he called on the military establishment to not be 'neutral' and support him, which it rejected.

After his ouster, Imran Khan continued pressuring the government to hold snap elections. On 26 April 2022, Khan said he would organize a march to Islamabad to "give a message to America that we are a free country." The next day he said he wanted two million people to march to Islamabad.

== Timeline ==
=== Pre-march (May 24) ===
A federal cabinet meeting chaired by Shehbaz Sharif decided on blocking the planned long march; the ministry of interior announced a security plan, deploying 22,000 officers (incl. 8,000 Punjab Constabulary, 2,000 Frontier Corps and 2,000 anti-riot personnel). Raids were conducted at the homes of PTI leaders Hammad Azhar, Usman Dar, Babar Awan, Walid Iqbal, and Firdous Ashiq Awan.

=== March (May 25) ===
In the morning of 25 May 2022, Imran Khan departed Peshawar by helicopter to travel to Islamabad, as PTI supporters gathered in Lahore, Multan and Gujranwala. PTI supporters trying to breakthrough roadblocks at Batti Chowk in Lahore are dispersed by tear gas. Protestors in Islamabad breached the Red Zone and clashed with law enforcement agencies. PTI leader Yasmin Rashid's car in Lahore was attacked by police as it tried to pass a cordon at Bati Chowk, which received public criticism for 'gangsterism'. According to police sources, the number of protestors was 20,000.

According to the Punjab Police, it retrieved weapons from the vehicles of PTI Lahore leaders Zubair Niazi and Bajash Niazi. PML-N leader Maryam Nawaz claimed that the police had recovered "223 bore guns, 13 SMG rifles, three pistols, 10 'kopay', 96 magazines of SMG rifles and 223 bore guns, 26 magazines of pistols, 50 boxes of bullets and six bigger packs of bullets". DIG Operations of Lahore Sohail Chaudhry claimed the police had received information on illegal weapons. Zubair Niazi rejected the claims, calling them "fake news" and saying that the police had not raided his houses or vehicles.

The federal government imposed Section 144 in Islamabad, Rawalpindi, and Lahore, under which 250 people in Punjab were detained. Dawn said a total of 1,000 PTI leaders and workers had been 'rounded up' by police. M1, M2, and GT Road motorways were closed in addition to Attock Bridge. Police sources, according to Dawn said 150 freight shipping containers had been placed on roadsides in Rawalpindi district, and that 4,000 police had been called from Multan, Lahore, Farooqabad, and Sargodha to aid Rawalpindi and Attock police. The police conducted raids in Murree, Gujar Khan, Kahuta, Taxila and Rawalpindi. During the crackdown a police officer was fatally shot in Model Town, the suspect and his father were remanded by an anti-terrorism court.

=== End of the march (May 26) ===
Imran Khan called off the long march on May 26, and demanded the government dissolve assemblies and announce an election.

== See also ==
- 2014 Azadi march
- 2019 Azadi march
- 2022 Haqeeqi Azadi march
- November 2024 PTI protest
