= List of pro-Palestinian protests in Pakistan =

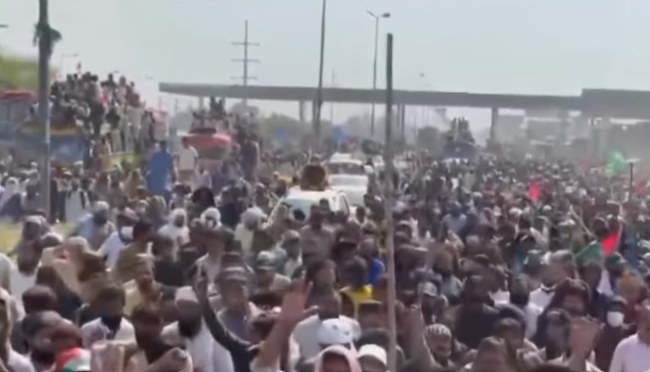
Labbaik Ya Aqsa Million March, October 2025

This is a list of pro-Palestinian demonstrations in Pakistan, including marches, sit-ins, campus encampments, and other actions held in support of Palestinian rights.

== List ==
Estimated attendance is either mentioned explicitly in the references or a midpoint is used, i.e., 50 when dozens are mentioned, 500 when hundreds are mentioned, and so on.

=== Pre-2023 ===
Date	City/town	Estimated attendance	Description	Ref(s)
2005	Islamabad	?	Jamaat-e-Islami / opposition protests - In 2005, Jamaat-e-Islami, leading an opposition alliance, planned to stage protests (e.g., greeting Foreign Minister with black flags) against Pakistan’s engagement/diplomatic interaction with Israel, especially over meetings between Pakistani and Israeli foreign ministers.	
2010	Karachi Press Club	?	PLF - A round-table (conference) organized by Palestine Foundation Pakistan in Karachi Press Club, titled "محصورین فلسطین اور ان کی پکار"/"Mahsooreen Palestine aur un ki pukar" (The besieged Palestinians and their call), to protest Israeli and Egyptian blockade of Gaza.	
28 August 2011	Karachi	?	Youm-ul-Quds marches/rallies (Imamia Students Organization, Jafaria Students Organization) expressing solidarity with Palestinians.	
22–23 November 2012	Lahore / Karachi / Islamabad etc.	?	Demonstrations to "show solidarity" with people of Gaza after Israeli operations; slogans against US/Israel. Multiple parties were involved.	
24 November 2012	Peshawar (also other parts of KPK)	?	Jamaat-e-Islami holds protests against Israeli aggression in Gaza; rallies at provincial headquarters.	
17 August 2014	Karachi	5,000	Yom-e-Yekjehti-e-Palestin ("Day of Solidarity with Palestine") protests across Pakistan, organised by Jamaat-e-Islami and others; Gaza Million March in Karachi.	
10 July 2015	Karachi	?	Al-Quds Day rally: Imamia Student Organization and other religious/political groups marched in solidarity with Palestinians.	
10 December 2017	Karachi	?	Protest by Majlis Wahdat-e-Muslimeen (MWM) & other religious groups; burning US & Israeli flags after Trump’s recognition of Jerusalem as capital of Israel. The protest was near the US Consulate.	
18 May 2018	Islamabad / other cities	?	After escalation in Gaza, solidarity protests held across Pakistan following Friday prayers; people demanded the international community take notice of Israeli actions.	
20 August 2020	Islamabad (Senate)	?	Opposition protests in Parliament / Senate over Federal Board of Revenue (FBR) summoning of the Palestinian envoy over alleged misuse of vehicles; protested as a violation of diplomatic norms.	
19 May 2021	Karachi	1,000+	Thousands of people gathered at the Karachi Press Club to protest against Israel's actions in the Gaza Strip during the 2021 Israel–Palestine crisis.	
21 May 2021	Chaman, Balochistan	?	Rally organized by JUI-Nazriati on "Palestine Day" when a bomb (in a motorcycle) exploded as the protest dispersed, killing 6 (or 7) and wounding 14 others.	
21 May 2021	Nationwide Pakistan	?	Palestine Solidarity Day observed across Pakistan: rallies and demonstrations after tensions rose over Sheik Jarrah / Al-Aqsa incidents.	

=== 2023 ===
Date	City/town	Estimated attendance	Description	Ref(s)
15 October 2023	Multiple cities across Pakistan (Karachi, Lahore, Rawalpindi etc.)	?	Several participants across Pakistan gathered in multiple cities to show support and solidarity with the Palestinians in the Gaza Strip.	
29 October 2023	Islamabad	1,000+	Thousands of supporters of the Jamaat-e-Islami Pakistan party gathered in Islamabad to protest against Israel's bombardment of Gaza as well as chanting anti-American slogans.	
7 November 2023	Islamabad	?	Joint protest rally by business community, journalists, civil society calling for an independent Palestinian state, global peace.	
6 December 2023	Islamabad (Jinnah Convention Centre)	?	Hurmat-e-Masjid Aqsa Conference organized by Majlis Ittehad-e-Ummah Pakistan: joint declaration condemning Israeli aggression, call for Jihad, boycott of Israeli products, observance of Youm-e-Hurmat Masjid Aqsa.	

=== 2024 ===
Date	City/town	Estimated attendance	Description	Ref(s)
30 March 2024	Mirpur, Azad Kashmir	400	Nearly 400 people gathered at a pro-Palestine protest after Ramadan evening prayers. In the end, more than 50 men were arrested by police after chanting anti-Israel slogans and set a KFC restaurant on fire.	
13 May – 22 June 2024	Islamabad (Gaza Chowk)	?	"Save Gaza" protests/sit-in at D-Chowk in Islamabad in solidarity with Palestinians; included clashes and a car-ramming incident killing 2 protesters.	
2 June 2024	Karachi	1,000+	A pro-Palestinian demonstration called the "Gaza Million March" organized by the Jamaat-i-Islami (JI).	
July 2024	Faizabad (Rawalpindi / Islamabad)	?	Week-long sit-in (dharna) by TLP over Gaza war, demanding boycott of Israeli goods and government action; ended after negotiation with government.	
25 October 2024	Islamabad	?	Police prevent pro-Palestine rally from going to US embassy; protests led by Muslim Tulba Mahaz under Senator Mushtaq Ahmad Khan; arrests.	

=== 2025 ===
Date	City/town	Estimated attendance	Description	Ref(s)
21 March 2025	Multiple cities (Karachi, Lahore, Islamabad, Quetta, Faisalabad etc.)	1,000+	Thousands of people marched in several cities in Pakistan to protest against Israel's actions in Gaza.	
13 April 2025	Multiple cities (Karachi, Lahore, Islamabad etc.)	5,000	Widespread pro-Palestinian demonstrations (e.g., "Gaza is Calling You" in Lahore and "Gaza Solidarity March" in Karachi, led by Jamaat-e-Islami) condemning Israeli actions, calling for boycotts and government action. On April 19, More than 170 people were arrested for attacking KFC Pakistan restaurants as part of a boycott against US brands supporting Israel.	
2 October 2025	Karachi	1,000+	Thousands of Pakistanis marched through the city to protest against Israel's interception of the Global Sumud Flotilla.	
4 October 2025	Lahore	1,000+	Thousands of people marched through the city to protest against Israel's interception of the Global Sumud Flotilla.	
5 October 2025	Karachi	1,000+	Demonstration and march through the city center.	
7 October 2025	Multiple cities (Karachi, Lahore, Islamabad, Quetta, Faisalabad etc.)	?	Demonstrations in city centers.	
9 October 2025 – 14 October 2025	Lahore → Muridke / toward Islamabad	8,000–10,000	The "Labbaik Ya Aqsa Million March" led by TLP: attempted march on Islamabad; included road blockades, clashes with police, multiple arrests, and casualties.	
30 November 2025	Karachi	?	Demonstration and march through the city centre, chanting slogans in support of the Palestinians and condemned Israel's actions in Gaza.	

=== 2026 ===
Date	City/town	Estimated attendance	Description	Ref(s)
13 March 2026	Karachi	1,000+	Demonstration and march through the streets of Karachi to celebrate Quds Day in solidarity with Palestinians.	

== See also ==
- Gaza war protests
- Lists of pro-Palestinian protests
