= 2025 Tehreek-e-Labbaik Pakistan protests =

Gaza war protests in Pakistan

Labbaik Ya Aqsa Million March
- Part of Gaza war protests
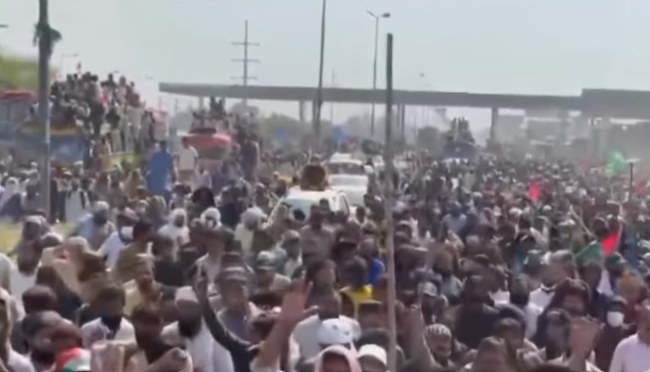
- Live images of the protests cropped from a video published by 95 News
- Date: 9 October – 14 October 2025
- Location: Lahore to Muridke to Islamabad–Rawalpindi, Pakistan
- Caused by: Gaza genocide
- Goals: Solidarity with Palestinians amid Gaza war; protest march to U.S. Embassy
- Methods: Road blockades; sit-ins; long march
- Result: Protests violently suppressed; Temporary internet, communications & social media shutdown; TLP party banned by the Government of Pakistan on 23 October, 2025, for "involvement in terrorism and violence"

Parties
Tehreek-e-Labbaik Pakistan	Government of Pakistan; Civil Armed Forces; Pakistan Rangers; Federal Constabulary; Pakistan Police; Government of Punjab; Punjab Police; Punjab Rangers

Lead figures
Saad Hussain Rizvi; Syed Zaheer-ul-Hasan; Syed Ahmed Bukhari	Shehbaz Sharif; Maryam Nawaz; Mohsin Naqvi

Number
8,000–10,000 protestors	5,500 Police; 1,000 Federal Constabulary; 500 Rangers

Casualties and losses
3 TLP protestors killed (Police claim); 11 TLP protestors killed (TLP claim); 100–700 arrested	1 Police SHO killed 48–112 police injured
- 1 bystander killed 40 government & private vehicles set on fire

On 9 October 2025, the Islamist political party Tehreek-e-Labbaik Pakistan (TLP) launched a protest march from Lahore and Faisalabad toward Islamabad under the banner of the Labbaik Ya Aqsa Million March. The movement called for a rally outside the US Embassy in Islamabad in solidarity with the Palestinians amid the ongoing Gaza genocide. The planned march triggered a major security response: authorities imposed Section 144 in Rawalpindi to restrict public gatherings, suspended 3G/4G mobile data services in Islamabad and Rawalpindi, and placed shipping containers alongside a heavy police deployment to seal off the Red Zone around the capital. Clashes erupted in Lahore when Punjab Police raided the TLP headquarters on Multan Road to arrest party leader Saad Rizvi. Police used tear gas and live fire to disperse demonstrators. According to reports, at least 11 TLP workers were killed and dozens more were injured during the live fire and shelling by the police. The government maintained that the TLP had not obtained the required permission for the march, attributing the unrest to internal party disputes. Pakistan Tehreek-e-Insaf member Sheikh Waqas Akram has compared the incident to Model Town Massacre and has said the government could not carry out a transparent probe into the massacre, hence independent observers and human rights organisations must be included to ensure a fair investigation.

In the aftermath, the Pakistani government banned the TLP under the Anti-Terrorism Act in late October 2025.

== Background ==
The group has used marches and protests in the past, chanting slogans such as "Labbayk Ya Aqsa" (which roughly translates to "I am here for Al-Aqsa") and "Pro-Palestinian." The "Labbaik Ya Aqsa Million March" continues this tradition. Sources reported that the TLP leadership used inflammatory speeches and rhetoric, which authorities deemed abusive or provocative. That leading the way in measures predicting widespread unrest, authorities imposed Section 144 (ban on assemblies), suspended mobile internet (3G/4G) services in Islamabad and Rawalpindi, placed shipping containers to block roads leading to the capital, and detained TLP activists.

== Timeline ==
=== October 8–9 ===
Preparations intensified ahead of the march. Authorities in Rawalpindi imposed Section 144, prohibiting public gatherings, and detained around 117 key TLP activists. Containers were placed near the Faizabad Interchange and other major routes, while security was tightened across the twin cities.

=== October 9 ===
Mobile internet services (3G/4G) were suspended in Islamabad and Rawalpindi from midnight to 10 pm on October 9. Clashes erupted in Lahore after a police raid on the TLP headquarters aimed at arresting its leader, Saad Rizvi. TLP supporters responded with stone pelting and iron rods, prompting police to use tear gas. At least three policemen were injured.

=== October 10 ===
The march was scheduled for October 10, 2025. Authorities had already closed major roads and sealed off the Red Zone around Islamabad.

=== October 11 ===
TLP supporters regrouped near Muridke and announced their intent to continue the march toward Islamabad. Clashes were reported along the GT Road corridor, leaving several injured. Police detained over 100 activists following the unrest.

=== October 12 ===
The standoff escalated as protesters camped in Muridke. According to officials, dozens of police officers were injured, while TLP claimed multiple fatalities among its members. The Punjab government deployed additional police and Rangers, and roads toward Islamabad remained sealed.

=== October 13 ===
Violence escalated near Lahore and Muridke as police attempted to disperse the advancing TLP march. According to officials, at least five people, including a police SHO, were killed and dozens were injured when clashes broke out between security forces and protesters. Police used tear gas and aerial firing to contain the crowd, while TLP claimed multiple deaths among its members.

=== October 14 ===
The Punjab government extended the enforcement of Section 144 in Rawalpindi and Islamabad for an additional 48 hours amid continued tensions. Internet and mobile data services remained suspended across the twin cities, and heavy police deployment continued along the GT Road to prevent further TLP advances. TLP leaders accused the authorities of carrying out an "unprovoked crackdown", while officials claimed the party had refused to negotiate peacefully.

== Reactions ==
- Imprisoned former prime minister and Pakistan Tehreek-e-Insaf (PTI) leader Imran Khan expressed support for the TLP protests, highlighting what analysts described as a troubling alignment on certain issues. Former PTI information minister Fawad Chaudhry questioned official casualty figures during the clashes, citing contacts with local leaders.
- PTI Central Information Secretary Sheikh Waqas Akram denounced the "bloodshed" as "reprehensible, inhumane and disgraceful," describing the use of force as "brutal and excessive" and calling the scenes "deeply tragic and heartbreaking." PTI demanded the resignation of the Punjab chief minister and expressed solidarity with victims of state brutality.
- Jamiat Ulema-e-Islam (F) leader Maulana Fazlur Rehman condemned the government's use of force against TLP activists.
- Adviser to the Prime Minister Rana Sanaullah stated that the ban aimed to purge "anti-state and terrorist elements" from the party rather than eliminate it entirely.
- Other Barelvi religious organisations distanced themselves from TLP's approach. Some former TLP leaders and ticket holders publicly disassociated from the party, accusing it of serving an "enemy agenda".
- A TLP spokesperson defended the protests as solely aimed at expressing solidarity with Palestinians in Gaza. Analysts expressed doubts over the ban's long-term effectiveness, citing TLP's resilient vote bank and past revocations of similar measures.

== Aftermath ==
Following the dispersal, the federal government banned Tehreek-e-Labbaik Pakistan (TLP) on 24 October 2025, declaring it a proscribed organization under the Anti-Terrorism Act of 1997, citing involvement in terrorism. The Punjab government moved to freeze TLP assets and properties, and transferred control of associated mosques and seminaries.

TLP challenged the ban notification in court, arguing it was issued without due process. TLP leader Saad Rizvi and others were placed on a no-fly list amid ongoing investigations.

It was discovered in 2026 that a key party figure, Inayatul Haq Shah, along with his family members and other accomplices, had used 1,800 different accounts to finance the TLP. At least PKR 13.4 million in cash was withdrawn from a madrassa's account on 13 and 14 October 2025.

== See also ==
- 2024 Faizabad sit-in
- D-Chowk Dharna
- List of pro-Palestinian protests in Pakistan
