= 2024 Faizabad sit-in =

2024 Faizabad Sit-in
- Part of the Gaza war protests
- Date: July 2024
- Location: Faizabad Interchange, Rawalpindi, Pakistan
- Caused by: Israeli war crimes in Palestine
- Goals: Boycott of Israeli products, humanitarian aid to Palestine
- Methods: Sit-in, protest
- Result: Government agreement to requests

Parties
Tehreek-e-Labbaik Pakistan (TLP)	Government of Pakistan

Lead figures
Saad Hussain Rizvi	

The 2024 Faizabad sit-in was a week-long protest organized by the Tehreek-e-Labbaik Pakistan (TLP) in Faizabad. The demonstration was a response to the war crimes committed by Israel in Palestine, with requests for a government-led boycott of Israeli products and provision of aid.

== Background ==
The protest sit-in at Faizabad Interchange was initiated by the TLP under the leadership of Saad Hussain Rizvi. The sit-in followed a protest march that began at Liaquat Bagh in Rawalpindi. The march drew participants from various parts of the Rawalpindi Division.

== Demands ==
The TLP put forth several requests, including an official boycott of Israeli products, provision of food and medical aid to Palestinians, particularly those affected by Israel's military aggression in Gaza. A key demand was for the Pakistani government to designate Israeli PM Benjamin Netanyahu as a terrorist.

== Resolution ==
The week-long protest concluded after successful talks between the TLP and the Federal Government. The government agreed to send over 1,000 tons of food and other relief supplies to Gaza before 31 July. The government also pledged to continue and enhance its efforts to assist the people of Palestine.

== See also ==
- D-Chowk Dharna
- 2025 Tehreek-e-Labbaik Pakistan protests
- List of pro-Palestinian protests in Pakistan
