= 2019 Azadi march =

2019 protest march against Pakistan government

2019 Azadi Long march
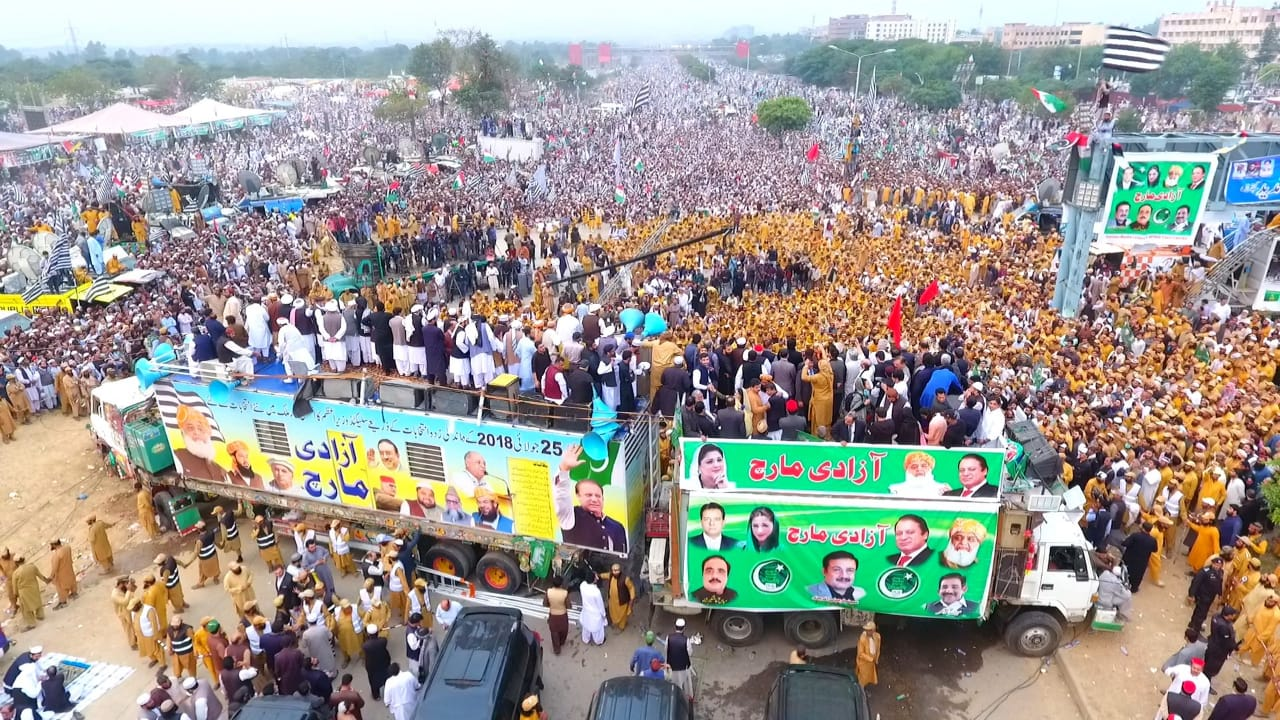
- Date: 27 October 2019 – 13 November 2019 (18 days)
- Location: Karachi To Islamabad, Pakistan
- Caused by: Allegations of irregularities in the 2018 Pakistani election
- Goals: Dismissal of the government and resignation of Prime Minister Imran Khan; A snap election
- Methods: Sit-in; protest march
- Status: Convert Into PDM
- Result: Convert Into PDM

Parties
Government of Pakistan	Jamiat Ulema-e-Islam (F); Supporters: Pakistan Peoples Party; Pashtunkhwa Milli Awami Party; Awami National Party; Muttahida Qaumi Movement - Pakistan; Pakistan Muslim League (N)

Lead figures
(Pakistan) Imran Khan (PTI); (Pakistan) Pervez Khattak (PTI); (Pakistan) Shafqat Mahmood (PTI); (Pakistan) Noor-ul-Haq Qadri (PTI); (Pakistan) Sadiq Sanjrani (BAP); (Pakistan) Asad Qaiser (PTI); (Pakistan) Chaudhry Pervaiz Elahi (PML(Q)); (Pakistan) Asad Umar (PTI); (Pakistan) Aamir Liaquat Hussain (PTI)	Fazal-ur-Rehman; Akram Khan Durrani; Abdul Wasey; Abdul Ghafoor Haideri; Farooq Sattar; Amir Khan; Waseem Akhtar; Khawaja Izharul Hassan; Abdul Waseem; Faisal Subzwari; Nasreen Jalil; Kunwar Naveed Jamil; Supporters: Raza Rabbani; Saeed Ghani; Bilawal Bhutto Zardari; Asif Ali Zardari; Nasir Hussain Shah; Muhammad Zubair Umar; Nehal Hashmi; Aimal Wali Khan; Asfandyar Wali Khan; Mahmood Khan Achakzai; Maryam Nawaz; Nawaz Sharif; Shehbaz Sharif

Number
8000 policemen	100,000-1,000,000 Male.

Casualties and losses
0	0
- 0

Casualties
- Deaths: 0
- Injuries: 0
- Arrested: 8 arrested

The 2019 Azadi march was a protest march led by Maulana Fazl-ur-Rehman of Jamiat Ulema-e-Islam (F) in Islamabad, Pakistan from 28 October 2019. The march opposed Prime Minister Imran Khan, demanding his resignation, and new elections. No women were part of the protests. The protest involved hundred of thousands of protesters.

== Background ==
Fazal-ur Rehman had accused the government of Imran Khan of Zionism, Qadianiat and authoritarianism ever since he delved into politics. These allegations would increase when Imran Khan's ex-wife Reham Khan herself claimed that he was a Zionist puppet. Later on further controversies would corroborate their allegations including accusations of 2018 general elections, appointment of Ahmadi economist Atif Mian as an advisor in the EAC on 1 September 2018, the alleged visit to Pakistan by Israeli Prime Minister Benjamin Netanyahu on 25 October 2019 and later acquitting of Asia Bibi who was convicted of Blasphemy, the arresting of Khadim Hussain Rizvi and other TLP leaders on 23 November 2018, arresting of members of the other two main opposition parties Maryam Nawaz(August 2019) and Asif Ali Zardari(June 2019) and accusations of bribing Members of the Parliament which were raised during a No confidence motion against Senate Chairperson Sadiq Sanjrani and Deputy Chairperson Saleem Mandviwalla in August 2019 when 64 parliamentarians of 53 parliamentarians required raised their hands yet 50 parliamentarians voted in the secret ballot. The country had also undergone a Debt crisis and Inflation in 2019 during his regime.

In June 2019 the party had announced that it would hold a great march towards the capital.

Government's reaction

It was decided that the Government, with its firm belief in upholding democratic ideals, would allow the proposed Azadi March, if it takes place within the ambit of law and the Constitution as interpreted in the decisions of the Supreme Court and Islamabad High Court

— PM office media wing

On 4 October 2019 Maulana Fazl-ur-Rehman announced that the Azadi March would commence on 27 October 2019 in order to force the Prime Minister to resign, it was to reach Islamabad by 31 October 2019, Fazl had said that the march will commence from karachi. On 11 October 2019 Maulana Fazl ur Rehman had an important meeting with Saudi Ambassador to Pakistan Nawaf bin Said al maliki regarding the political situation of the country and persuaded him to call of the Azadi March. The two major Pakistani opposition parties, PPP and PML-N had said that although they would not join the Azadi March physically yet they would provide support to JUI-F in the Azadi March. After a meeting on 14 October 2019, ANP president Asfandyar Wali Khan said that he would lead the Azadi March if Maulana Fazl ur Rehman is arrested. On 21 October 2019 two JUI (F) leaders, Maulana Shafiq-ur-Rehman and Maulana Muhammad Irshad, were arrested when they were caught inciting people against the government to join the Azadi March in Shams Colony, Islamabad. The government would then form a seven-member committee headed by Defence Minister Pervez Khattak consisting of Education minister Shafqat Mahmood, Religious Minister Noor-ul-Haq Qadri, Senate Chairman Sadiq Sanjrani, National Assembly Speaker Asad Qaiser, Speaker of Provincial Assembly of Punjab Chaudhry Pervaiz Elahi and Minister for planning development and special initiatives Asad Umar to negotiate with the opposition led Rehbar committee to end the Azadi March however the Committee demanded the resignation of Imran Khan. Once the Committee returned to Prime Minister Imran Khan the government allowed the Azadi March as long as it be held within ambit of law. NACTA would later on alert the leaders of various political parties, especially those participating in the Azadi March regarding the danger of terrorist attacks. On 26 October 2019 JUI-F Islamabad General Secretary Mufti Muhammad Abdullah and Islamabad's Deputy Commissioner signed an agreement that the march will not enter the Red Zone in exchange for a NOC. At a news conference at Bannu Akram Durrani, the head of the Rehbar committee, announced that the participants of the Azadi March would not enter the Red Zone. The government created a two-layer security ring for the protection of the Red Zone and had placed hundreds of containers at roadsides and greenbelts in case of need, the government also took additional security measures to protect the Faizabad Interchange and important entry points like Rawat and Tarnol. The protesters would ensure that the participants do not leave their designated value, public rights would not be violated and would hold responsibility for internal security. The government on the other hand would neither create hurdles for the protestors nor block their food supply. According to JUI-F plans after having a speech in Sohrab Goth regarding Kashmir the marchers will depart from the area after being joined by caravans from Hub, after being joined by more caravans at Rohri bus stand, Sukkur the marchers will enter Punjab through Ubauro. Marchers in Khyber Pakhtunkhwa would gather at meeting areas in Peshawar, Mardan, Charsadda, Nowshera and Buner for solidarity with Kashmir before joining at a meeting point on Grand Trunk Road. A JUI-F convoy led by Maulana Abdul Wasey would also start from Baleli road, Quetta and reach Islamabad via the Loralai-Dera Ghazi Khan route, marchers would also come from Chaghi, Nushki, Gwadar and Turbat. Shortly before the Rally started on 27 October, JUI-F leader Mufti Kifayatullah was arrested in Islamabad.

== The March ==
On 27 October 2019 JUI (F)'s Azadi March left Karachi's Sohrab Goth area for Islamabad by using the M-9 motorway, thousands of people including seminary students participated in the march, additional convoys from the PPP, PML-N and ANP also joined the march. Meanwhile, thousands of people under the leadership of Maulana Abdul Wasey also left the Kuchlak area of Quetta to pass through Loralai then Dera Ghazi Khan to reach Islamabad and join the Azadi March, the party had also hired a large number of transportation vehicles including buses, according to a senior member of opposition the number of buses had already exceeded 400. Earlier the day of 27 October Maulana Fazl-ur-Rahman's container got stuck on an overhead bridge which caused a delay for a few hours. Other than JUI (F) leadership PPP leaders Raza Rabbani and Saeed Ghani who on 26 October 2019 had announced to join the march from Jamshoro, PML-N leaders Mohammad Zubair and Nehal Hashmi and ANP leaders Shahi Syed were also on board the leading container. At 7:00pm the Caravan reached Hyderabad and after a short rest left for Sakrand to reach Sukkur.

The caravan then spend a night at Sukkur where they were joined by PPP leaders Syed Qaim Ali Shah, Nisar Khuhro and Nasir Hussain Shah before preparing for a large rally in that city. On 28 October 2019 Fazl-ur-Rahman along with Nisar Khuhro would criticize the government and in particular PEMRA for media censorship. On that day the general secretary of JUI (F) Abdul Ghafoor Haideri would reassure the government that the protesters would gather in a ground at Islamabad at H-9 but not enter the Red Zone after meeting Muhammad Hamza Shafqaat in Islamabad. On the evening of 28 October 2019 the caravan reached Daharki to go to Multan. According to CPO(City Police Officer) of Multan Zubair Dreshak the marchers were preparing to raid the Fatima Jinnah Housing Scheme in Multan, CPO Zubair had claimed to arranged excellent security measures. The marchers coming from Dera Ghazi Khan and Muzaffargarh were to take bypass from Bahawalpur chowk to reach Multan. Meanwhile, on the way to Multan three speeding vehicles crashed into each other at Ghotki, no casualties occurred. Once the Azadi March caravan entered Punjab Maulana Fazal-ur-Rehman thanked Sindh leader Rashid Mahmood soomro for making good arrangements in Sindh for Azadi March, the Azadi March arrived at Multan on 28 October 2019. After an overnight stay at Multan the caravan then headed for Lahore where they were supposed to arrive at 29 October 2019. On the night of 29 October 2019 the March reached Sahiwal, which lied in between Lahore and Multan. The March was then expected to reach Lahore in the next four to five hours. Many political parties had set up camps at Lahore to welcome the Azadi March, JUI (F) had set camps at Data Darbar and Thokar Niaz Beg, Jamiat Ahle Hadith has set up a camp at Batti chowk on Ravi road. PML-N had set its camp at Chauburji while PPP had set its camp in Samanabad while the Traders community had its camp at Multan Chungi and Yateem Khana. On the wee hours of 30 October 2019 the Azadi March arrived at Lahore.

Later on the March would enter Muridke in Sheikhupura where the PML-N Legislator Rana Tanveer Hussain welcomed the march, Maulana Fazl ur Rehman then did a speech there to pray for the health of Nawaz Sharif. The Azadi March then entered Kamoke in Gujranwala. The DC Islamabad then announced that metros will not be functional on 31 October 2019. According to the plans the march participants were to stay overnight at camps in Gujar Khan near Rawalpindi before marching to the capital. According to the plans by JUI-F Khyber Pakhtunkhwa chief Atta-ur-Rehman the JUI (F) caravan will depart from Khyber Pakhtunkhwa on 31 October 2019, Caravans will depart from Peshawar, Chitral, Dir, Kohistan, Shangla, Torghar, Bajaur and Mohmand to arrive at 31 October 2pm at Rashakai Interchange. Caravans from South and North Waziristan, Kurram Agency, Orakzai and Kohat will arrive at Peshawar. Caravans from Abbottabad, Mansehra, Battagram and Haripur were expected to unite at Hasan Abdal at 4pm.

== Aftermath ==
Media censorship had reportedly increased and sources suggest that it had exceeded the media censorship of the Military regime of Zia-ul-Haq. The march was called-off on 13 November 2019 and was converted to a blockade of major roads as 'Plan-B'. After Nawaz Sharif left Pakistan for the UK on an air ambulance on 19 November 2019 for treatment the blockade 'Plan-B' was called-off as well. ‘Plan C’ of the Azadi march included opposition parties in Balochistan held rallies and protests across the region against the Pakistan Tehreek-i-Insaf's government.

However, as of January 2020 Imran Khan remained the prime minister, with the march failing in its primary objective as Pakistan's powerful military backed the incumbent government, according to Reuters news agency. Analysts have divergent opinions on the march's failure, some say it failed as the military backed the government, while others argued that the opposition itself was divided, as the two main opposition parties had 'stayed away' from the sit-in protests.

== See also ==
- 2014 Azadi March
- 2017 Faizabad sit-in
- 2019 Article 370 Violation
- 2019-2020 Lebanese protests
- 2019-2021 Iraqi protests
- Inauguration of the Kartarpur corridor
- 2019 Supreme Court verdict on Ayodhya dispute
- 2022 Azadi March
- 2022 Azadi March-II
- PTI do-or-die protest
