= 2025 Khyber Pakhtunkhwa political crisis =

Constitutional and political crisis in Pakistani province of KPK

In October 2025, Khyber Pakhtunkhwa was plunged into a brief constitutional and political crisis following the controversial resignation of Chief Minister Ali Amin Gandapur, the contradictory approval of that resignation by Governor Faisal Karim Kundi, and the nomination and subsequent election of Sohail Afridi as his successor amid opposition claims of illegality. Following the instructions of PTI founder Imran Khan, Gandapur had submitted a typed resignation on October 8, but the resignation has mysteriously disappeared. On October 11, Kundi formally acknowledged receipt of the handwritten resignation at 2:30 pm, but again refused and raised questions over the inconsistency of the signature. Kundi said it would be acted upon after constitutional scrutiny. The PTI moved swiftly to install Sohail Afridi, nominating him as the chief minister, scheduling the KP Assembly to elect a new chief minister on October 13. Opposition parties boycotted the election session, arguing that the election was unconstitutional because Gandapur's resignation was not formally accepted and his cabinet was not dissolved, and Governor Kundi later declared the election illegal due to the lack of procedural legitimacy.

The crisis came to an end when the Peshawar High Court (PHC) ruled that since Gandapur confirmed his resignation on the floor of the assembly, it came into effect when he tendered it on 8 October. The PHC ordered Kundi to administer the oath of office to Afridi, and instructed Babar Saleem Swati, the Speaker of the Provincial Assembly, to administer the oath of Kundi fails to do so.

== Background ==
Ali Amin Gandapur of the Pakistan Tehreek-e-Insaf (PTI) became the Chief Minister of Khyber Pakhtunkhwa in the 2024 provincial elections. His cabinet ruled until October 2025, when internal party decisions suggested his resignation, leading to a change in leadership.

Governor Faisal Karim Kundi has been a central figure in this crisis since May 2024. His appointment itself was controversial, as earlier Gandapur criticized it as “illegal” and there was tension between the CM and the governor.

== Gandapur's resignation ==
=== Initial (Typed) resignation ===
On 8 October 2025, Gandapur announced that he was resigning as Chief Minister, allegedly on the instructions of PTI founder Imran Khan, and nominated Sohail Afridi as his successor. The resignation letter was said to have been typed on official letterhead and signed by Gandapur. However, the Governor House denied receiving the typed resignation, leading to confusion and allegations that it had gone "missing".

=== Handwritten resignation ===
On October 11, the governor's office confirmed that it had received a handwritten resignation from Gandapur, which was delivered at 2:30 p.m. Governor Faisal Karim Kundi posted that "the handwritten resignation of the Chief Minister Khyber Pakhtunkhwa has been received and acknowledged by the Governor House." The governor said that the resignation would be scrutinized under constitutional and legal procedures before being acted upon.

=== Controversy over signatures ===
Governor Kundi then raised a procedural objection: he claimed that two resignation letters were submitted (typed on October 8 and handwritten on October 11), which did not have matching signatures. Due to the discrepancies, the governor returned both letters "with observation" and summoned Gandapur to appear at the Governor's House on October 15 at 3:00 PM to resolve the authenticity. In his response on social media (X), Gandapur insisted that both resignations had his "authentic signatures" and claimed that the resignation (typed) submitted on October 8, which had been previously denied, was now accepted.

== Afridi's nomination as Chief Minister ==
Following the announcement of Gandapur's resignation, the PTI central leadership (through party general secretary Salman Akram Raja) declared Sohail Afridi as its candidate for the Chief Ministership of Khyber Pakhtunkhwa. Afridi is a PTI MPA from PK-70 Khyber-II, and will become the first Chief Minister from the erstwhile Federally Administered Tribal Areas if elected. As part of the process, four candidates submitted their nomination papers for the election of Chief Minister: Afridi (PTI), and three opposing candidates from JUI-F, PML-N, and PPP, respectively.

== Election for Chief Minister ==
The KP Assembly session was called on 13 October 2025, to elect a new Chief Minister. Opposition lawmakers boycotted the session, saying the election was unconstitutional as Gandapur’s resignation was not formally accepted nor was his cabinet dissolved. In his remarks before the walkout, Ibadullah Khan, the Leader of the Opposition, asserted that “the election of a new Chief Minister in the presence of the incumbent Chief Minister is unconstitutional.” Speaker Babar Saleem Swati ruled that Gandapur had resigned twice and declared the election legal, citing Article 130(8) of the Constitution and the Assembly Rules.

== Peshawar High Court ruling ==
On 13 October, the same day as the chief ministerial election, the PTI approached the Peshawar High Court (PHC) to seek the nomination of the Speaker or any other person "considered appropriate", in place of Governor Kundi, to administer the oath of office to Afridi.

On 14 October, the PHC ruled that since Gandapur "unequivocally confirmed" that he tendered his resignation on the floor of the assembly, it took effect on 8 October, and the post of Chief Minister consequently became vacant on that date. In its ruling, the PHC also ordered Governor Kundi to administer the oath of office to Afridi by 4:00 PM on 15 October. In case of Kundi failing to do so, the court also instructed the Speaker to administer the oath instead, stating that any further delay would violate constitutional procedure.

On the same day, Bilawal Bhutto Zardari publicly pressured Governor Faisal Karim Kundi to fulfill his constitutional and legal obligation to administer the oath to the newly elected Chief Minister Sohail Afridi as ordered by the Peshawar High Court. He urged Kundi to return to Khyber Pakhtunkhwa to take the oath, even offering assistance (the Sindh Chief Minister’s airplane) to facilitate it.

On 15 October 2025, Governor Kundi administered the oath of office to Afridi as the Chief Minister of the province at the Governor's House.

== See also ==
- 2022 Pakistani constitutional crisis
- 2022–2024 Pakistan political unrest
- Punjab constitutional crisis (2022)
- 2026 Khyber Pakhtunkhwa state of emergency
