= Mian Iftikhar Hussain =

Pakistani politician (born 1958)

- میاں افتخار حسین میا افتخار حسېن
- Born: 15 April 1958 (age 68); Pabbi, Nowshehra, North-West Frontier Province, Pakistan (present-day Khyber Pakhtunkhwa, Pakistan)
- Political party: ANP (1990-present)

Mian Iftikhar Hussain (Pashto: میا افتخار حسېن; Urdu: میاں افتخار حسین) is a Pakistani politician who is a senior leader and the President of the Awami National Party (ANP) Khyber Pakhtunkhwa.

He has served as the spokesperson of the Pakistan Democratic Movement (PDM), an anti-establishment coalition of political parties in Pakistan.

== Early life ==
Iftikhar was born on 15 April 1958 in Pabbi, Nowshera, Pakistan. He completed his master's in Pashto from the University of Peshawar. He was the student leader of the Pashtun Students Federation (PSF).

In July 2010, he and his family were targeted by extremists in two separate attacks the first of which included the murder of his only son in a targeted attack. After the martyrdom of his lone son he formed Rashid Shaheed Foundation to help the new generation in Education and to restore and to preach Peace Education.

== Political career ==
In 1990, Iftikhar was elected to the Provincial Assembly of KPK. He has been elected three times to the Provincial Assembly of KPK in 1990, 1997 and 2008. Iftikhar has previously served as the Awami National Party's Khyber Pakhtunkhwa Provincial Information Secretary, General Secretary and Central Secretary General. He has also served as spokesperson of PDM. Currently he is serving as the President of the Awami National Party Khyber Pakhtunkhwa.

He was ANP's provincial elementary & secondary education minister and then provincial information minister for Khyber Pakhtunkhwa, Pakistan.
