= Imprisonment of Imran Khan =

Detention of a Pakistani prime minister since 2023

- Occupations: Politician, former Prime Minister, former international cricketer , former commentator, Former PTI Chairman, ICC hall of fame member
- Status: Incarcerated at Adiala Jail
- Allegiance: Pakistan
- Convictions: Corruption (2023); Mishandling state gifts (2023–2024); Leaking state secrets (2024); May 9 riots (2023); November 2024 PTI protest (2024)
- Penalty: Multiple sentences (some suspended or overturned)

Details
- Date: 3 years, 98 days
- Imprisoned at: Adiala Jail, Rawalpindi

Imran Khan, the former Prime Minister of Pakistan, has been imprisoned by Pakistani authorities since his arrest in August 2023. Khan, who founded the Pakistan Tehreek-e-Insaf (PTI) party, has faced multiple legal cases following his removal from office via a no-confidence vote in April 2022. His detention stems from convictions in corruption cases, including the Toshakhana case and Al-Qadir Trust case, as well as charges related to leaking state secrets and incitement during protests. Some convictions have been overturned or suspended on appeal, but new charges have kept him incarcerated.

Khan's imprisonment has sparked widespread protests by PTI supporters demanding his release, with notable clashes in May 2023 and November 2024. Reports of restricted access for family, lawyers, and party members have raised concerns about isolation and potential mistreatment. Health issues, including significant vision loss in one eye attributed to delayed medical care, emerged in early 2026. Khan and his party maintain that the cases are politically motivated by the military establishment and the government of Shehbaz Sharif, claims denied by authorities.

As of February 2026, Khan remains in Adiala Jail in Rawalpindi, facing over 180+ cases across Pakistan. The situation has drawn international attention from human rights groups, with calls for his release citing alleged violations of due process.

== Background ==
Imran Khan served as Prime Minister from 2018 to 2022, during which he faced accusations of corruption and misuse of office. After his ouster, he alleged foreign interference and organised rallies against the succeeding coalition government. Legal proceedings intensified in 2023, leading to his initial arrest on 9 May at the Islamabad High Court in the Al-Qadir Trust case. He was briefly released but re-arrested on 5 August 2023 after a conviction in the Toshakhana case for misusing state gifts.

Subsequent convictions included a 10-year sentence in the cypher case for leaking diplomatic documents (overturned in June 2024), a 14-year term in the Toshakhana case (suspended in April 2024), and further sentences in the Al-Qadir Trust and iddat cases. By December 2024, Khan faced 186 cases, with additional charges for incitement related to the May 2023 protests. In December 2025, he received a 17-year sentence in the Toshakhana-II case and a 14-year term in the Al-Qadir Trust case.

== Imprisonment conditions ==
Khan is held in Adiala Jail, where authorities report he has access to amenities including a walking area, television, exercise equipment, and a separate kitchen. However, Khan has described his cell as a "death cell" typically used for high-risk prisoners, with limited outdoor time. In May 2024, he informed the Supreme Court of solitary confinement with restricted access to lawyers and family. The government denies mistreatment, stating facilities comply with regulations for former officials.

Khan's international counsel Jared Genser has said that his prison conditions amounted to "slow-motion murder."

== Protests for release ==
Khan's arrests triggered significant unrest. The May 2023 arrest led to the May 9 riots, where PTI supporters attacked military installations, resulting in over 9,000 arrests and at least 10 deaths. Authorities responded with force, drawing criticism from human rights groups.

Protests continued into 2024 and 2025, including a major rally in November 2024 led by his wife Bushra Bibi, demanding his release and reversal of a constitutional amendment. Thousands marched on Islamabad demanding Khan's release, defying lockdowns and police clashes. Protests continued into 2025, with PTI delegations demonstrating outside Adiala Jail over access restrictions.

In July 2025, PTI announced a 90-day street-level protest campaign across Pakistan, framing it as a rejection of political suppression and demanding Khan's release. This included rallies and road blockades in various provinces, with Khyber Pakhtunkhwa then Chief Minister Ali Amin Gandapur leading announcements.

On the second anniversary of his jailing in August 2025, thousands rallied nationwide, resulting in over 240 arrests. PTI described these as peaceful demonstrations for democracy, while authorities cited violence and imposed lockdowns. In December 2025, supporters rallied in Islamabad and Rawalpindi amid health rumours.

On 13 February 2026, following reports of Khan's severe vision loss, Tehreek Tahafuz Ayin staged a sit-in outside Parliament House in Islamabad, demanding his transfer to Al-Shifa Hospital for treatment. The Red Zone was sealed, and parliament lights were turned off during the protest. Countrywide demonstrations occurred, including road blockades in Khyber Pakhtunkhwa, rallies outside press clubs in Karachi and Lahore, and protests in Peshawar. PTI leaders warned of escalated actions if medical facilities were not provided promptly.

=== 2026 Long March ===
In August 2026, while lamenting the third anniversary of Khan's imprisonment, the PTI leadership vowed to conduct an "Islamabad Long March" on 27 September. Later, Sohail Afridi reiterated the demands for unrestricted meetings with Khan and his access to treatment by his personal physician and expeditious hearings of court cases against him. The same month, a PTI worker was killed in an alleged exchange of fire between him and the security forces on Rawalpindi's Mall Road. While the Information Minister at the time Attaullah Tarrar criticised the party over a "pattern" of "violent protests," PTI demanded an impartial judicial inquiry and its Islamabad regional president rejected all allegations. In response to these developments, the Government of Punjab invoked Article 245 and three companies of the Pakistan Army were deployed for "sensitive security duties" in Rawalpindi for over a period of six months. On 20 September, prior to the Long March, Khan's sister Aleema Khan was detained for over 30 days. The order for her arrest alleged that she was mobilising Khan's supporters "through social media and public meetings." On 25 September, KPK CM and PTI postponed the march to 4 October.

On 4 October 2026, the Long March was launched after talks between the government representatives and the joint team of PTI and Tehreek-e-Tahafuz-e-Ain Pakistan (TTAP) collapsed. The "principal point of deadlock" was party's access to Khan besides the government counterterrorism policy on Khyber Pakhtunkhwa. PTI also claimed that the Centre had sought the provincial government's "unconditional support" for its operations as well as support for imposing emergency measures within 72 hours in the merged districts and adjoining areas. In Islamabad, authorities blocked the roads with more than 2,000 shipping containers.

On 6 October, Khan's cousin Qasim Zaman was taken into custody after the Rawalpindi deputy commissioner (DC) ordered his detention under the Maintenance of Public Order Ordinance (MPO) for 30 days.

Khawaja Asif remarked that there would be no relief for Imran Khan if PTI continued to pressure the government through the march. He also accused PTI of "declaring war" against Pakistan while comparing the party with TTP.

On 11 October, emergency rule was imposed upon Khyber Pakhtunkhwa after recommendations from the PM's cabinet and subsequent approval by President Asif Ali Zardari. After National Assembly and Senate's endorsement of the emergency, TTAP declared that there would be no talks until meeting with Imran Khan and an update on his health status.

Mehmood Khan Achakzai claimed that Khan was being pressured to accept a "Benazir, Nawaz-style deal" for a self imposed exile similar to when Benazir had to voluntarily leave the country in 1997 and when Nawaz Sharif had to leave the country in 2000 following a deal negotiated by Saudi and Lebanese leaders.

== Denied family and party visits ==
Access to Khan has been intermittently restricted. In June 2024, he reported solitary confinement with limited meetings for lawyers and family, though authorities claimed he had amenities and visitation rights. From November 2025, family and party members were barred for over three weeks, prompting protests and court interventions.

Khan's sister, Uzma Khanum, met him on 2 December 2025 after a month-long denial, reporting he appeared healthy but isolated. PTI alleged violations of prison rules allowing weekly visits. In February 2026, the Supreme Court ordered phone access to his sons and medical evaluations.

Khan's sons, Sulaiman Khan and Kasim Khan, claimed that they have been denied visas to visit Pakistan and denied visit to their father since 2022. Additionally, while criticising the government for denying Khan consultations in private medical facilities, they said that their father might not survive his "solitary confinement." In August 2026, when Sky Sports broadcast an interview of the two brothers with Michael Atherton (Former Cricketer), the Pakistan Cricket Board lobbied for the interview to not be broadcast and briefly threatened to pull Pakistan's cricket team out of a test match scheduled for that day. The Pakistan government also raised the issue with UK's Foreign, Commonwealth and Development Office.

== Health concerns ==
Khan undergoes bi-weekly medical examinations, with no issues reported as of October 2024. In January 2026, he underwent an eye procedure at a government hospital amid speculation. By February 2026, his lawyer reported 85% vision loss in the right eye due to central retinal vein occlusion, attributing it to delayed treatment since October 2025. Authorities planned to transfer him to a new Islamabad Jail with medical facilities by April 2026.

On 1 August 2026, Dr Akhtar Ali Bandeshah of the Pakistan Institute of Medical Sciences (PIMS) examined Khan and noted complaints of uncontrolled and fluctuating blood pressure, palpitations, headache and restlessness. Imran Khan himself attributed these symptoms partly to infrequent meetings with his wife, family and social contacts, as well as the absence of newspapers and TV. Later that month, the Supreme Court ordered Imran Khan's transfer to Shifa International Hospital in Islamabad, with a medical board overseeing his treatment. It also ordered family visits and communication with his sons. However, the federal government challenged the order as "discriminatory," seeking a review and insisting Khan be examined at a public hospital instead. Ultimately, Khan was not taken to the desired hospital and was escorted to the government-run PIMS instead. The security presence at the Shifa Hospital was a "decoy." The PTI's Information Secretary remarked if the court order was implemented in its true spirit, or was it "merely a superficial exercise for propaganda." During the brief visit on 21 August, Khan could not undergo a recommended computed tomography angiography (CTA) due to unavailability of the facility at the government hospital despite "the presence of a functional CT scanner in the radiology department capable of conducting the test."

Concerns regarding Khan's health have also been expressed by the global cricket fraternity. In February 2026, fourteen former international cricket captains appealed to Pakistan's government, expressing "profound concern" over reports on Khan's health and prison conditions. Then in August 2026, twenty-one former international cricket captains including Sunil Gavaskar and Alastair Cook wrote a letter to Shehbaz Sharif renewing their appeal for Khan's medical treatment and expressing concern over Khan being allowed "only a few hours" at a hospital.

During the October 2026 Long March, PTI Chief Whip Malik Aamir Dogar said that PTI's minimum demand had been the inclusion of Khan's personal physicians in his treatment to dispel "doubts and suspicions" about his health and that the centre government would not agree to it either.

== Impact ==
The imprisonment has polarised Pakistani politics, with PTI boycotting aspects of the 2024 elections and alleging military interference. International bodies, including Amnesty International and the UN, have called for his release, citing arbitrary detention.

The UN special rapporteur on torture spoke out against Khan's treatment three times in 2025 and called for his "inhumane detention conditions" to end.

== See also ==
- Arrest of Imran Khan
- May 9 riots
- Al-Qadir Trust case
