= Hurmat-e-Masjid Aqsa Conference =

Pro-Palestine Conference in Islamabad, Pakistan (2023)

The Hurmat-e-Masjid al-Aqsa Conference was a conference held at the Jinnah Convention Center in Islamabad, Pakistan on 6 December 2023 in response to the outbreak of the Gaza war.

The conference was attended by various Pakistani Islamic scholars and leaders like Taqi Usmani, Muneeb-ur-Rehman, Fazal-ur-Rehman, Siraj-ul-Haq, Ijaz-ul-Haq, Aurangzeb Farooqi, Sajid Mir and others.

In a video address to the conference, Hamas leader Ismail Haniyeh stated that the Palestinian people held high hopes for Pakistan's support. He characterized Hamas's attacks on Israel as acts of self-defense and asserted that the group was engaging Israel on "all levels."

== Conference Resolutions ==
The conference concluded with several resolutions, including a declaration that characterized the struggle as a jihad and advocated for an economic boycott of Israel. Additionally, Maulana Fazlur Rehman announced a nationwide observance of "Youm-e-Harmat Masjid Aqsa" (Day of the Al-Aqsa Mosque) on December 8.

== See also ==
- International Conference on Supporting Palestine Intifada
- List of pro-Palestinian protests in Pakistan
