= 2022 Pakistani constitutional crisis =

No-confidence motion against Prime Minister

A political and constitutional crisis emerged in Pakistan from, 3 April 2022 to 10 April 2022 when, National Assembly's deputy speaker Qasim Khan Suri dismissed a no-confidence motion against prime minister Imran Khan during a session in which it was expected to be taken up for a vote, alleging that a foreign country's involvement in the regime change was contradictory to Article 5 of the constitution of Pakistan. Moments later, Khan stated in a televised address that he had advised president Arif Alvi to dissolve the National Assembly. Alvi complied with Khan's advice under Article 58 of the constitution. This resulted in the Supreme Court of Pakistan (SCP) taking a suo motu notice of the ongoing situation, creating a constitutional crisis, as effectively, Imran Khan led a constitutional coup. Four days later, the SCP ruled that the dismissal of the no-confidence motion, the prorogation of the National Assembly, the advice from Imran Khan to president Arif Alvi to dissolve the National Assembly, and the subsequent dissolution of the National Assembly were unconstitutional, and overturned these actions in a 5–0 vote. The Supreme Court further held that the National Assembly had not been prorogued and had to be reconvened by the speaker immediately and no later than 10:30 a.m. on 9 April 2022.

On 9 April, the National Assembly was reconvened, however the motion was not immediately put to a vote. The session went on all day but the voting did not begin. Shortly before midnight, the speaker and the deputy speaker both resigned.

Shortly after midnight on 10 April, the National Assembly voted and passed the no-confidence motion with 174 votes, a majority, removing Khan from office, and making him the first prime minister in Pakistan to be removed from office through a no-confidence motion. No prime minister has completed their term in Pakistan's 75-year history, which has been marred by frequent coups by the country's powerful military.

== Background ==
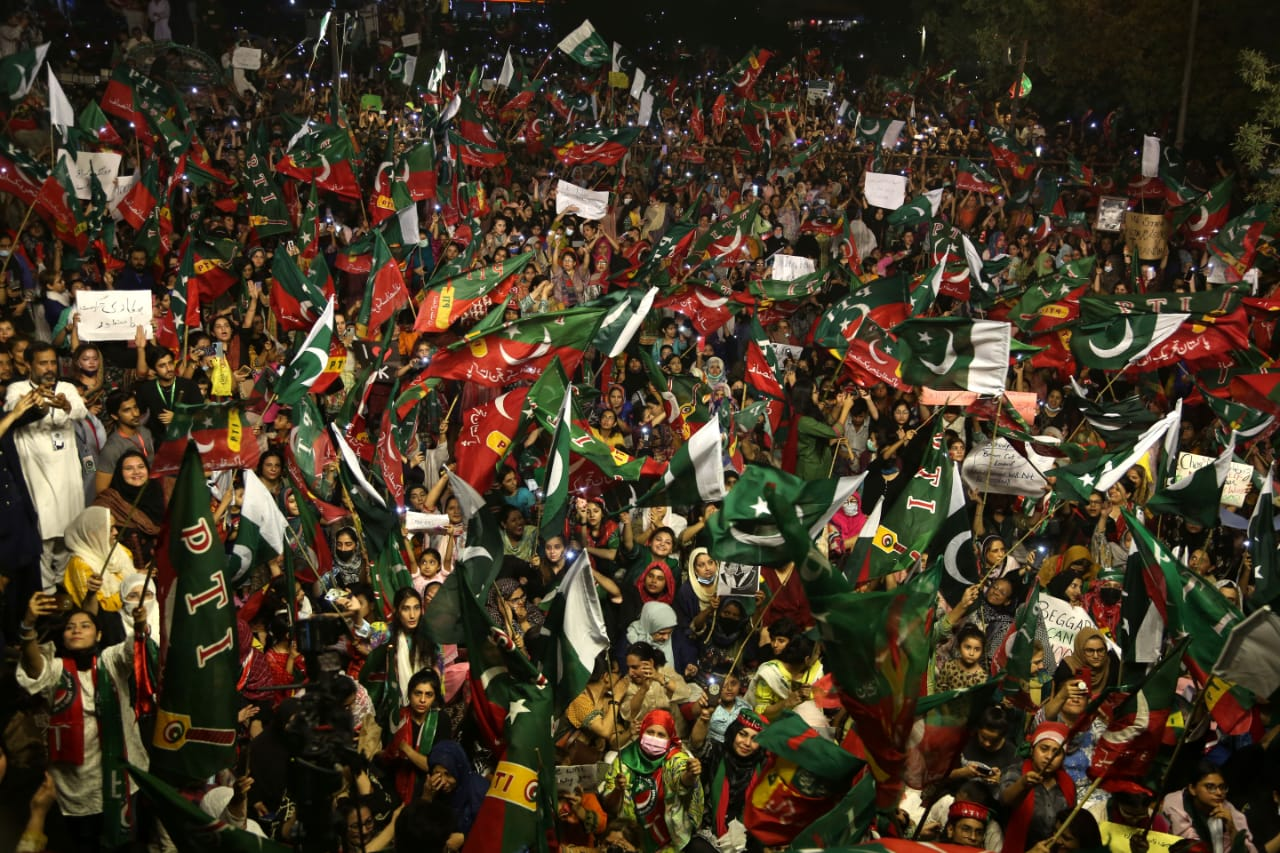
The 2022 Pakistani protest

On 3 April 2022, as the National Assembly session began, law minister Fawad Chaudhry took the floor stating that loyalty to the state was the basic duty of every citizen under Article 5(1). He reiterated earlier claims by Khan that a foreign conspiracy was hatched to oust the government. Chaudhry then called on the deputy speaker to decide the constitutionality of the no-trust move. Therefore, Suri termed that the motion violated Article 5 of the Constitution of Pakistan due to foreign powers involvement in support of the motion. Soon after this, Khan, in an address to the nation, announced that he had advised president Arif Alvi to dissolve the assemblies following the dismissal of the no-confidence motion against him. Hence, on the same day, the president dissolved the National Assembly on the prime minister's advice under Article 58 of the constitution.

The move to dissolve the assembly was controversial because of Article 58's explicit statement that the prime minister "against whom a notice of a resolution for a vote of no-confidence has been given in the National Assembly but has not been voted upon" does not have the earlier mentioned power to advise the president to dismiss the assembly. Later in the day, the Chief Justice of Pakistan (CJP) Umar Ata Bandial took suo moto notice of the ongoing situation in the country. A three-member bench of the Supreme Court comprising CJP Bandial, Justice Ijazul Ahsan and Justice Muhammad Ali Mazhar heard the case and said the court would review the deputy speaker's actions. The same day, Joint Opposition held a parallel session in the National Assembly after the house was adjourned and passed the no-confidence vote against Khan, declaring it successful with 197 votes.

On 4 April the Cabinet Secretariat issued a notification stating that Khan had "ceased to hold the office of the prime minister of Pakistan with immediate effect". However a contradicting notification issued by President Office the same day stated that Khan would continue to dispose of his duties as Prime Minister till the appointment of a caretaker premier.

=== Alleged foreign interference ===
In a speech at Parade Ground in Islamabad on 27 March 2022, Khan removed a document from his pocket and waved it to the crowd and media crew. Khan and members of his cabinet said that the letter demanded the removal of the Prime Minister and, if Khan remained the prime minister, it would lead to horrific consequences. It also said that “if the no-confidence vote against the prime minister succeeds, all will be forgiven in Washington", a reference to Pakistan's stance on the Russia-Ukraine war. In an address to the nation, Khan accused the United States of "conspiring against his government." On 30 March 2022, the Islamabad High Court ruled that publishing the contents of a diplomatic cable from the outgoing Pakistani ambassador, which Khan described as "containing threats from the United States," would violate his oath of office and the Official Secrets Act, 1923.

The Pakistan Armed Forces and the Ministry of Information and Broadcasting initially rejected Khan's allegations as "fake propaganda". On 10 May 2022, the Prime Minister of Pakistan, Shehbaz Sharif addressed the National Assembly and acknowledged the letter was threatening, but said the notes did not involve a conspiracy or treason. The US Department of State repeatedly denied that the US government had engaged in any interference. Several international media also found the allegation to be implausible and alleged that it had been invented by Khan to stoke up anti-American sentiment in the country.

On 9 August 2023, the alleged cypher was published in full by The Intercept. According to the cable published by The Intercept, at a 7 March 2022 meeting, the U.S. State Department encouraged the Pakistani government to remove Imran Khan from office because of his neutrality on the Russian invasion of Ukraine.

After Khan's removal the US helped Pakistan secure an emergency loan from the International Monetary Fund, which eased the economic pressure and allowed the new government to delay elections. The loan the government o introduce austerity measures and arrange a weapons sale to Ukraine via a controversial arms dealer, Global Ordnance.

== Supreme Court timeline ==
On 3 April 2022, the Pakistani Supreme Court took suo-moto cognizance of the National Assembly's proceedings. Notices were ordered to be issued to the Attorney General, the Pakistan Bar Council and the Supreme Court Bar Association, by a three-member bench of the court. A larger five-judge bench of the court was formed on 4 April 2022 to hear the case along with petitions filed by Pakistan Peoples Party, the Supreme Court Bar Association, Pakistan Muslim League (N), the Sindh High Court Bar Association and the Sindh Bar Council. The cases were heard daily from 3 April to 7 April.

On 5 April, the court adjourned the matter.

On 6 April, the Supreme Court adjourned again the matter while seeking the minutes of the NSC meeting where the "foreign conspiracy to overthrow the Khan Government" was discussed.

On 7 April, a five-member larger bench of the apex court, headed by Justice Bandial and comprising Justice Munib Akhtar, Justice Ijazul Ahsan, Justice Mazhar Alam, and Justice Jamal Khan Mandokhail ruled that the attempt to dissolve the National Assembly was unconstitutional in a 5–0 vote. The ruling also allowed for a future no-confidence vote to be held on 9 April.

On 9 April, despite the ruling from the highest court, the no-confidence motion was not laid in the national assembly until late night after the resignation of the Speaker and Deputy Speaker. The motion was voted upon and passed by the National Assembly shortly after midnight on 10 April 2022.

== Aftermath ==
On 9 April, the National Assembly was reconvened, however the motion was not immediately put to a vote amid filibustering by members of the treasury benches and the session was adjourned thrice. The same day, Attorney General Khalid Jawed Khan resigned. The Speaker and Deputy Speaker of the National Assembly also resigned shortly before midnight leading to former Speaker of the National Assembly Ayaz Sadiq stepping in as chairman.

Shortly after midnight on 10 April, the National Assembly successfully passed a no confidence motion, which resulted in Khan ceasing to hold the office of prime minister of Pakistan and making him the first prime minister in Pakistan to be removed from office by a vote of no confidence.

On April 11, the National Assembly elected the leader of the opposition, Shehbaz Sharif, to succeed Khan as the new prime minister, with 174 votes polled in favour of his succession. The PTI boycotted the vote.

== Reactions ==
=== Pakistan ===
- On 4 April, as the week began, the Pakistan Stock Exchange fell more than 1,200 points and the benchmark KSE 100 index ended the week with a loss of 708 points or 1.56% to close at 44,445 level.
- Pakistan Army Chief Qamar Javed Bajwa indirectly refuted Imran Khan's allegation of United States' conspiracy.
- In an address to the nation on the night of 8 April, Khan said he accepted the court's decision even as he criticized it for not investigating allegations of foreign interference. He, however, vowed to "continue to fight until the last ball", and called for protests on 10 April 2022.
- On 28 March 2023, Pakistan Tehreek-e-Insaf (PTI) released a 158 paged document called "Dossier of Violation of Human Rights Post Regime Change" to highlight the human right abuses in occurred from 10 April to 9 March 2023.

=== International ===
- India's Ministry of External Affairs spokesperson said that it is an internal matter for Pakistan, but India continues to monitor the developments there.
- Russia slammed the United States for "alleged interference in Pakistan's affairs" for its "own selfish purposes".
- United States denied seeking any regime change in Pakistan. It said that it supports Pakistan's constitutional process, and is closely following developments in Pakistan.

== See also ==
- 2022–2025 Pakistan political unrest
- No-confidence motion against Imran Khan
- 2025 political crisis in Khyber Pakhtunkhwa
- 2022 Pakistan economic crisis
- 1953 Pakistani constitutional coup
- Military coups in Pakistan
