= Islamabad Jail Complex =

Prison Facility located in Islamabad, Pakistan

- Location: Sector H-16, Islamabad, Pakistan
- Status: Under Construction
- Capacity: 2,000 inmates
- Opened: TBD
- Managed by: Government of Pakistan
- Warden: TBD

The Islamabad Jail Complex also known as Islamabad model jail is a prison that is currently being built in Sector H-16 of Islamabad, Pakistan.

== History ==
The construction of the Islamabad Jail Complex has experienced significant delays spanning a decade, primarily due to a lack of available funds. However, in June 2022, former Prime Minister Shehbaz Sharif issued instructions to the relevant authorities to expedite the completion of this ongoing prison project in the upcoming fiscal year. To oversee the progress and evaluate the prison project, he established a six-member committee led by the former Interior Minister Rana Sanaullah Khan.

== Facilities ==
The Islamabad Jail Complex is currently being built on a sprawling 90-acre site and is designed to accommodate approximately 2,000 inmates. This complex will include several key facilities, such as a 22-bed hospital, a school dedicated to the children of the jail staff, a mosque, a library, an auditorium, segregated cells for different purposes, and separate barracks for female and juvenile prisoners. Additionally, the premises will feature schools, mosques, training centers, playgrounds, and courts for the Islamabad Capital Territory. Furthermore, there are plans to establish a training center specifically for prison officials within the complex.
