= D-Chowk Dharna =

Pro-Palestine protest in Islamabad, Pakistan

- Part of the Gaza war protests
- Date: 13 May – 22 June 2024 (1 month and 2 weeks)
- Location: D-Chowk, Islamabad, Pakistan
- Caused by: Gaza war
- Methods: Demonstrations, sit-ins, marches
- Result: Successful Negotiations with Government (See Demands)

Parties
Save Gaza Campaign	Federal Government; Islamabad Police

Lead figures
Mushtaq Ahmad Khan; Humaira Tayyaba (Founder Save Gaza Campaign)	Interior Minister Mohsin Naqvi

Casualties and losses
2 killed, 4 injured (in one incident)	
- Protests resulted in clashes with police and a tragic incident where a car ran over protesters.

The D-Chowk Dharna was a series of protests held at D-Chowk in Islamabad, Pakistan, organized by the Mushtaq Ahmad Khan, a senior politician in Jamaat-e-Islami and former senator of Khyber Pakhtunkhwa. The protests were held in response to the ongoing Gaza war, with participants demanding decisive action from the Pakistani government and the international community.

On the 27th day of the sit-in to express love for Palestine and Gaza, D-Chowk was renamed Gaza Chowk. It was appealed to the public that now D-Chowk will be written, said and called Gaza Chowk. The board of Gaza Chowk was unveiled.

== Demands by Save Gaza Campaign ==
1. Prime Minister's Response: Prime Minister Shehbaz Sharif must respond to letters from Hamas Chief Ismail Haniyeh, affirming Pakistan's support for their resistance efforts
2. Relief Fleet: The Government of Pakistan must ensure the entry of a relief flotilla into the Gaza through sea route, with assistance from the Save Gaza Campaign.
3. ICJ Involvement: Pakistan should join South Africa in taking action at the ICJ regarding matters related to Gaza.
4. Justice and Compensation: Justice should be provided for those martyred during a sit-in, and the families of the martyrs must receive compensation from the government.
5. Quashing of Cases: Legal cases against the Save Gaza Campaign and Islami Jamiat Talaba must be quashed.
6. Role in Ceasefire: The Government of Pakistan should actively work towards a ceasefire in Palestine and advocate for a ceasefire resolution in the United Nations Security Council.

In a joint video released on Saturday night, Pakistan’s Interior Minister, Mohsin Naqvi, assured that the following demands from the Save Gaza Campaign would be met soon.

== Responses ==
=== State Resonse ===
The Islamabad Police arrested former Jamaat-i-Islami senator Mushtaq Ahmad Khan, on several charges. The allegations included pelting stones at law enforcement officials and threatening them with dire consequences. Despite these actions, protesters continued their demonstrations, staged sit-ins and announced plans for future protests.

=== Public response ===
The protests gained public attention and support. Various groups including the Pakistan Islamic Medical Association (PIMA) joined the protests. Protesters organized a hike in Islamabad to demand concrete steps for a ceasefire in Gaza and the establishment of a humanitarian aid corridor. The protesters also demanded Pakistan to take decisive action for immediate international intervention and increase pressure for an immediate ceasefire.

== Major incidents ==
=== Car incident ===
On May 21, 2024, an incident occurred during a protest where a speeding car ran over participants of the protest who were sleeping on a portion of Jinnah Avenue, resulting in two deaths and four injuries, including a police inspector. The driver, identified as a lieutenant in the Pakistan Army and son of a brigadier, was later arrested and handed over to the Military Police for legal proceedings.

=== Clashes with Police ===
Protesters clashed with the police on several occasions. In one instance, protesters attempted to enter Islamabad's red zone, leading to clashes with police. The police lathi-charged the protestors as a result of which some protestors were injured. In response, the protesters pelted stones at the police.

== See also ==
- 2024 Faizabad sit-in
- List of pro-Palestinian protests in Pakistan
