= November 2024 PTI protest =

November 2024 Protest in Pakistan

- Final Call; Do-or-die protest Part of 2022–2024 Pakistan political unrest
- Date: November 24, 2024 to November 27, 2024; 22 months ago
- Location: D-Chowk, Islamabad; 33.7294°N 73.0908°E
- Goals: Release of Imran Khan; Resignation of the Shehbaz Sharif government; Return of “Allegations of rigging in the 2024 Pakistani general election”; Repeal of the Twenty-sixth Amendment to the Constitution of Pakistan

Parties
Pakistan Tehreek-e-Insaf	Government of Pakistan; (Punjab, Pakistan) Government of Punjab

Lead figures
Bushra Bibi; Ali Amin Gandapur; Gohar Ali Khan; Omar Ayub Khan	Asif Ali Zardari; Shehbaz Sharif (Pakistan) Mohsin Naqvi; Asim Munir

Units involved
Pro-PTI protestors	Civil Armed Forces; Pakistan Rangers; Punjab Rangers; Islamabad Police

Casualties and losses
Per PTI: 20 supporters killed; 12 party workers killed	Per Government: 4 security personnel killed; 4 security personnel injured
- Per independent sources: 5/10-18 (including 5 security personnel) killed; 110 injured

Casualties
- Arrested: 4,185
- Result: None of PTI’s demands met.; Violent government crackdown, reports of bullets fired by security forces with PTI claiming a "massacre".; Bushra Bibi and Ali Amin Gandapur flee from the protest.

From 24–27 November 2024, PTI organized the Final Call protest, led by Bushra Bibi and Ali Amin Gandapur. During the protest, supporters of Imran Khan clashed with police in Islamabad as their march to the capital was obstructed. At least six people, including four security personnel, were killed when a vehicle rammed into them on 26 November. Meanwhile, several were injured during crowd containment via tear gas and rubber bullets, while some journalists were attacked by Khan's supporters. Late at night, Interior Minister Mohsin Naqvi warned that security forces would retaliate with live ammunition.

In response to the clashes, on 27 November, a violent crackdown by Pakistani security forces, led by Naqvi, resulted in casualties. The government denied using live rounds, asserting that the situation was under control after clearing the protest area. According to anonymous sources in local hospitals speaking to The Guardian, the families of the deceased speaking to Al Jazeera, government officials had confiscated records of dead and injured. The PTI described the incident as a "massacre", claiming that hundreds of its members were killed as police fired live ammunition during the final phase of the protest. Later, party sources stated that up to 20 of their workers had been killed, while the search for other victims was ongoing. Government ministers denied any fatalities among PTI protesters during the November 26 security forces raid in Islamabad, with interior minister Naqvi refuting these claims as "propaganda" and challenging the party to provide names of the deceased. Meanwhile, Islamabad's police chief reported five security personnel killed during the clashes and described significant damage caused by protesters. Al Jazeera revealed the names of the deceased and contacted the family members of several of the killed PTI protesters.

Public hospitals in the federal capital asserted that no bodies were brought in following the operation. However, documentary evidence contradicts these claims. On November 30, Geo TV Fact Check contacted over a dozen doctors, nurses, and hospital administrators, many of whom either denied the deaths or declined to comment, citing pressure from government authorities. According to the fact check, three individuals with gunshot wounds were brought to hospitals. One was admitted to PIMS Hospital on November 26 at 8:17 PM and pronounced dead at 8:30 PM. Another was pronounced dead at the Federal Government Poly Clinic Hospital at 5:12 PM the same day, while the third was pronounced dead at 5:00 PM. The security forces' crackdown began in the early hours of 27 November 2024.

PTI shared a post on its official X account stating "In view of the government's brutality and the government's plan to turn the capital into a slaughterhouse for unarmed citizens, (we) announce the suspension of the peaceful protest for the time being."

== Preceding events ==
=== Protest announcement ===
On 13 November 2024, Imran Khan issued a "final call" for a protest on November 24 in Islamabad from his imprisonment in Adiala Jail. The announcement was in response to the Twenty-sixth Amendment to the Constitution of Pakistan, which he criticised for infringing on rights. Khan and his party opposed the amendment, describing it as an attack on the judiciary. Furthermore, the announcement included demands to end the Second Shehbaz Sharif government's alleged "unjust arrests" and "stolen mandate," referencing PTI's claim that The Establishment rigged the 2024 Pakistani general election in favour of PMLN. Khan's sister, Aleema Khanum, urged Pakistanis to follow the protest call, relaying his message for a nationwide protest.

Separately, Chief Minister of Khyber Pakhtunkhwa Ali Amin Gandapur called on PTI supporters to prepare for the "final call." Gandapur stated that PTI members were ready to make the "ultimate sacrifice," adding that they would march "with our shrouds tied, bringing greater force and official machinery." Gandapur also mentioned informing his family of his readiness to embrace the ultimate sacrifice, stating, "If I don't return, consider it my final departure and hold my funeral prayers." Gandapur concluded his statement with a historical reference, saying, "We've already made two strikes, but remember, there were 17 battles at Panipat."

The protest was also referred to as the "do-or-die protest."

=== Lockdowns ===
Ahead of the protests, Pakistani Law Enforcement and the Government locked down the capital: Islamabad, fortifying the capital with numerous shipping containers and the deployment of tens of thousands of police and paramilitary forces in riot gear. Several highways and roads leading to the city were also blocked and barricaded by the government in an attempt to prevent protesters from entering the capital.

On 22 November 2024, Section 144 was imposed by the Punjab government, barring sit-ins, rallies, or protests for 3 days (from November 23 to November 25) officially due to security concerns ahead of the protests. The government cited the risk of public gatherings being targeted by terrorists or exploited for anti-state activities as the rationale behind the decision. The provincial government's spokesperson, Azma Bukhari, announced that the "protestors will be dealt with the same way as terrorists." Prior to the protest, 4,000 PTI supporters and members were arrested and detained by the federal government. The Interior Minister, Mohsin Naqvi, justified the arrests and security measures, stating they were necessary to protect residents and property. He attributed the inconveniences caused to people and businesses to PTI's actions. Naqvi further warned that anyone breaching the Red Zone would also be arrested.

The Islamabad High Court (IHC) chief justice, Aamer Farooq, declared that PTI's protest was unlawful as it was being held without formal permission. The court directed the government to maintain law and order in Islamabad, noting that the Belarusian president's upcoming visit with a high-profile delegation added to the need for heightened security.

Major motorways in Northern Pakistan, including Peshawar to Islamabad and Lahore to Islamabad routes, were closed to the public starting on the night of November 22, officially citing maintenance work, though reports linked the closure to anticipated PTI protests. It resulted in the closure of intercity bus operations to several cities in Punjab that were primarily serviced by these controlled-access highways. Pakistan Railways suspended all 25 trains scheduled to run between Peshawar, Rawalpindi, and Lahore on the day of the protest, citing safety concerns due to PTI protests. The suspension of services was a precautionary measure in response to the law and order situation caused by the protests, with a significant police presence deployed at the stations to ensure security. Additionally, the railway stations in these cities were sealed, and access to platforms was restricted to maintain order. The metro services were also suspended in Lahore and Islamabad on the day of the protest.

=== Internet restrictions ===
Mobile internet and access to messaging services such as WhatsApp were blocked in areas of Punjab, Sindh, and Khyber Pakhtunkhwa due to security concerns ahead of the protest. The government aimed to control potential unrest and prevent the spread of misinformation during the demonstrations. According to the interior ministry, mobile data and Wi-Fi services were suspended only in specific areas where security concerns existed, while services continued to operate normally in other parts of the country. Additionally, WhatsApp's reachability was restricted, but it was still accessible on 50% of servers connected to Pakistan Telecommunication Company Limited, indicating that the disruption was partial and not complete.

=== Warnings of terrorist attack ===
The National Counter Terrorism Authority (NACTA) has issued a warning ahead of Pakistan Tehreek-e-Insaf's (PTI) "do or die" protest scheduled for November 24. According to the advisory released on Saturday, the group known as "Fitna al-Khawarij," or Tehreek-e-Taliban Pakistan (TTP), may launch terror attacks in major cities on the protest day. NACTA also reported intelligence suggesting terrorists have entered Pakistan from Afghanistan.

== Timeline ==
=== PTI protest ===
Imran Khan's wife, Bushra Bibi took a leading role in the protest, arriving in Islamabad with thousands of PTI supporters who overcame security barriers to call for Khan's release. She spoke to the crowd near D-Chowk, a key area near parliament, urging that the protest be held there. Sources indicate that this move differed from previous instructions from Khan, which had advised assembling on the outskirts of the city.

The Pakistan Tehreek-e-Insaf initiated the protest on 24 November 2024 through several convoys across the country heading for D-Chowk by road. The largest and main convoy, led by Ali Amin Gandapur, left from Peshawar. The convoy also included PTI lawmaker Shahid Ahmed Khattak. The convoy moved through Swabi, the Hazara region, and faced police obstacles and barriers along its route, reaching the Hakkla Interchange before proceeding towards Islamabad. Security forces, including police and Rangers, were deployed along key points to manage the situation, and public criticism grew over disruptions caused by the march, including school closures and travel restrictions. PTI spokesman Sheikh Waqas Akram claimed the number of people to be 70,000 from Khyber Pakhtunkhwa alone.

The procession reached Islamabad on November 25 after crossing all hurdles, as security personnel attempted to contain the crowd using rubber bullets and tear gas. The protestors reached the Zero Point Interchange area of Islamabad during the afternoon of November 26, with the situation escalating amid ongoing clashes. There was significant resistance as police and security forces attempted to contain the advancing convoy. Bushra Bibi, leading the PTI group, had firmly instructed party workers to continue towards D-Chowk for the sit-in, despite the government's offer of an alternative location and the deployment of military personnel around the Red Zone.

=== The falling man ===
During the day of November 26, Pakistan's security forces were accused of pushing a man off a stack of cargo containers while protests were ongoing in the capital. Video footage showed officers carrying riot shields with markings indicating they were affiliated with the Pakistan Rangers, standing besides the man as he knelt in prayer with his hands raised in supplication. Soon, another of the personnel in a similar uniform approached him and immediately pushed him over the edge of the containers. The video shows the man trying to cling on as the officer who had pushed him pries his hands off and he falls. The video ends with protestors chanting loudly and pelting stones at the security personnel who are running away. The footage went viral on social media and drew considerable criticism from the public. There is uncertainty regarding the fate of the man, but the government later claimed that he was alive, but injured, and was filming a video for TikTok instead of being engaged in prayer during the incident.

=== Vehicle incident ===
At least four personnel of Pakistan Rangers and one civilian were killed when a car struck them at a checkpoint in Islamabad on the night of 26 November. The government claimed it was a targeted attack, meanwhile PTI leader, Zulfi Bukhari, denied the claim stating that "...there are videos viral on social media of protesters protecting and hugging rangers. This is a narrative the government is trying to create so they have the licence to kill." Soon after the incident, interior minister Naqvi, warned of use of live fire on protestors, alleging that the protestors had fired on security personnel using live weapons. Azaz Syed, a senior journalist, later claimed that the car that caused the accident was not driven by a PTI-affiliated individual but by the grandson of a former federal secretary who has been struggling with mental health issues.

=== Government crackdown ===
During midnight of November 26-27, the Government of Pakistan, Pakistan Police, and Pakistan Rangers initiated a crackdown on the protests. The Punjab Rangers were deployed under Article 245 with orders of shoot-on-sight for the protesters. Heavy tear gas shelling was initially fired at protesters prior to reaching Islamabad. The Guardian reported that the government had been criticized for a “draconian response”. The government arrested 1,000 protesters. Prime Minister Shehbaz Sharif labelled the protesters as “bloodthirsty”, further saying that it is not a peaceful protest, it is "extremism".

Official sources told The Guardian there had been 17 civilian deaths from police and paramilitary gunfire and hundreds more had been injured. Doctors at hospitals in Islamabad said they had received multiple patients with gunshot wounds. The Guardian reported that they witnessed at least five patients with bullet wounds in one hospital, which was surrounded by police. A doctor in an emergency ward said he had treated more than 40 injured patients, several of whom had been shot. "At least seven have died and four are in critical condition in the hospital". Drop Site News stated that "harrowing images have already begun circulating on social media of bloodied corpses of PTI activists and protestors".

The crackdown faced criticism by many, despite escalated censorship, videos of the crackdown surfaced, which includes bloody videos of protestors applying emergency care part of the claimed massacre. Arrest of 450 protestors has been claimed, whereas various figures of casualties have been quoted. The government has denied using live rounds. The protests were officially suspended by the party following the midnight crackdown.

== Casualties ==
After the withdrawal of protesters from Islamabad's Blue Area, PTI leaders accused security forces of opening fire on party supporters, resulting in several fatalities. While party sources reported the deaths of at least six individuals, PTI Secretary General Salman Akram Raja, in a video statement, claimed that around 20 supporters had been killed.

Whenever the issue of protester fatalities is raised, Information Minister Attaullah Tarar consistently responds by asking, "Where is the proof?". Government officials maintain that since no security personnel on duty were armed with live firearms, there was no possibility of civilian casualties. A supposed list of individuals brought to Islamabad's Polyclinic hospital, shared by social media users and reported by some journalists, claimed that at least two people had died and several others had been injured. However, in a statement on Wednesday morning, the hospital clarified that it had not issued any such list, and that the reports circulating on social media attributing the list to the hospital were false. A senior doctor from the capital, who requested anonymity, told Dawn that it was unfortunate the Ministry of Health had not released any official information regarding those injured or killed during the protest.

Al Jazeera confirmed the death of Anees Shehzad, a 20 year-old PTI supporter from Kotli Sattian, Punjab who was killed in the protests, with his death certificate declaring his death due to bullet wounds and a pelvic injury in clashes with security forces. Similarly, Mobeen Aurangzeb a 24 year-old supporter from Abbottabad was killed. Other family members including the family of a killed protester by the name of Malik Sadar Ali, who spoke to Al Jazeera also expressed how difficult it was for them to retrieve the bodies of their loved ones from the hospital authorities, as they claimed they were pressured into signing affidavits committing to not filing first information reports (FIRs) and enacting legal cases against security forces. A man named Mohammad Ilyas was also killed in a hit-and-run event, allegedly by security forces. Ilyas’ older brother, Safeer Ali described the chaos of the night of 26 November saying that security vehicles sped through a crowd of protesters. “They hit several people, including my brother,” he stated. Government officials denied any deaths claiming this to be false.

In a video message released on 27 November, PTI leader Salman Akram Raja rejected the official claim that no casualties occurred during the law enforcement action against their party’s marchers. Mr. Raja provided details, naming at least six victims: Muhammad Ilyas, Anees Satti, Malik Safdar Ali, Mubeen Aurangzeb, Abdul Rasheed, and Ahmad Wali. He stated that he would later share more information about other party workers and expressed concern that the state was instructing hospitals to destroy records of individuals whose bodies or injuries had been reported at healthcare facilities in the capital. Separately, at least four men believed to have died in the crackdown against PTI marchers were laid to rest in various parts of Khyber Pakhtunkhwa on Wednesday. The funerals were attended by a large number of locals, with the coffins draped in the PTI flag. Sources indicated that both victims died from bullet wounds, and no postmortem was performed on their bodies.

According to an Independent Urdu investigation, PIMS Hospital records and sources indicated 10 people died during the protests and 110 were injured from bullet injuries, while from the police 5 were injured. According to anonymous hospital officials, efforts have been made to remove records by government officials. BBC said that it "has confirmed with local hospitals that at least five people have died." And seen patients injured with gunshot wounds.

== Aftermath ==
=== Arrest of Matiullah Jan ===
On the evening of 27 November, Pakistani journalist Matiullah Jan, who had been investigating casualties from the protest, and his colleague Saqib Bashir were abducted by men in black uniforms from the parking lot of the Pakistan Institute of Medical Sciences (PIMS) in Islamabad. They were blindfolded and forced into a vehicle. Bashir recounted, "We were collecting data on the casualties."

Hours before his abduction, Jan had appeared on a TV program where he read from what he claimed were hospital records contradicting the government's denial that live ammunition was used by security forces or that any protesters were killed during the dispersal. Bashir was released on a street three hours later, while Jan was subsequently charged with terrorism and possession of narcotics. A First Information Report (FIR) alleged that he was found with 246 grams of methamphetamine at a vehicle checkpoint in Islamabad's E-9 area. The case was registered at 3:20 a.m., nearly an hour after the reported incident. On 30 November, he was presented in an anti-terrorism court in Islamabad from where he was released on bail.

== International reaction ==
Amnesty International called for an “urgent and transparent” investigation into the crackdown which it called deadly for the protesters.

The Secretary-General of the United Nations, Antonio Guterres deplored the violence in the protests, and called for calm and restraint on all sides.

Democratic American Congresswoman Rashida Tlaib has condemned what she called was the “brutal repression” of demonstrators in Pakistan, adding that political violence was being used to "suppress democracy". "I stand with the brave Pakistanis who are rising up and protesting for change," she posted on X.

Senator Fatima Payman of the Australian Senate reacted to the event stating that “The Australian government needs to take action like the US Congress and impose visa bans and asset freezes on General Asim Munir and others involved in corruption and human rights abuses”.

Ro Khanna, a U.S. Representative from California tweeted that he was "[h]orrified by reports of an attempted cover-up of the alleged killings of peaceful protestors by Asim Munir's regime in Pakistan."

== See also ==
- 2025 Tehreek-e-Labbaik Pakistan protests
- October 2026 PTI Long March
