= D-Chowk (Islamabad) =

Town square in Islamabad, Pakistan

- Location within Islamabad Capital Territory
- Location: Jinnah Avenue, Islamabad
- Postal code: 44000
- Nearest Rawalpindi-Islamabad Metrobus station: Parade Ground
- Coordinates: 33.729435798731494°N 73.09334404119988°E

Other
- Known for: Being a site of numerous political demonstrations and sit-ins

Democracy Chowk, commonly known simply as D-Chowk, is a large town square located on the junction of Jinnah Avenue and Constitution Avenue in Islamabad, Pakistan. It is located in the government district, close to several important government buildings: the Presidency, the Prime Minister’s Office, the Parliament, and the Supreme Court.

The square used to be a popular recreational area for the local people. After the shift of venue from Rawalpindi's Race Course, the Pakistan Day Parade used to be here for several years. It has now been moved to the Shakarparian Parade Ground.

The square is a frequent venue for political rallies and other public gatherings, and has been likened to Egypt's Tahrir Square. Since the square is a junction on two major roads, such meetings have repeatedly paralyzed traffic in Islamabad.

In April 2016, the government decreed that the square should be rebuilt to make it a no-go area for protesters. However, political rallies continue to be held there.

== History of gatherings ==
The first major demonstration held at the venue was on 4–5 July 1980. It was conducted by a religious group against the imposition of Zakat and Ushur Ordinance by President Muhammad Zia-ul-Haq. Led by Mufti Jafar Hussain, the protesters took over the nearby Pakistan Secretariat building, after which their demands were accepted, and they were exempted from paying the new proposed taxes.

On 17 August 1989, Nawaz Sharif led the opposition parties on the first death anniversary of Zia-ul-Haq. The crowd dispersed after the involvement of Interior Minister Aitzaz Ahsan.

On 16 November 1992, the opposition parties marched towards the D-Chowk while protesting against alleged rigging in the 1990 Pakistani general election. A few months later, on 16 July 1993, Benazir Bhutto, who was the Leader of the Opposition then, led her supporters towards the Secretariat while pressuring Prime Minister Nawaz Sharif to resign. This led to him, as well as President Ghulam Ishaq Khan, resigning, after the intervention of Chief of Army Staff Abdul Waheed Kakar.

As part of the Lawyers' Movement, Pakistani lawyers and their supporters ended their 2009 long march in front of the Parliament.

In January 2013, Muhammad Tahir-ul-Qadri and thousands of his Minhaj-ul-Quran supporters staged a sit-in at D-chowk, demanding the resignation of the government.

In April 2014, human rights activists and civil society members protested against missing persons at D-Chowk before being baton charge by the police.

On 14 August 2014, Imran Khan and Muhammad Tahir-ul-Qadri led their Azadi march and Inqilab March respectively from Lahore to D-Chowk in Islamabad while protesting against the Pakistan Muslim League (N) government. A 126-day sit-in followed, which ended on 17 December 2014.

On 27 March 2016, thousands of protestors from religious groups camped out at D-Chowk for several days after observing the chelum of Mumtaz Qadri.

In February 2022, Pakistan People's Party chairman Bilawal Bhutto Zardari led his Awami March, which commenced from Karachi and ended at Islamabad's D-Chowk.

Since May 2024, the sit-in organized by the Save Gaza Campaign has been ongoing. D Chowk was renamed Gaza Chowk on the 27th day of the sit-in to express love for Palestine and Gaza. It was appealed to the public that now D Chowk will be written, said and called Gaza Chowk. The board of Gaza Chowk was unveiled.

In November 2024, D-Chowk was the site of the 2024 Final Call protests, where supporters of Imran Khan marched to the capital, calling for him to be released. As a result, there was a violent crackdown by Pakistani security forces, resulting in at least 6 deaths, as well as thousands of arrests.
