= Arrest of Imran Khan =

2023 arrest of former Pakistani prime minister

- Date: 9 May 2023 and 5 August 2023
- Location: Islamabad High Court in Islamabad
- Cause: Allegations of corruption surrounding and the Al-Qadir Trust case and Toshakhana reference case.
- Participants: National Accountability Bureau; Police Service of Pakistan
- Arrests: Imran Khan; All PTI leadership

On 9 May 2023, the former Prime Minister and politician PTI founder and chairman Imran Khan was arrested from inside the Islamabad High Court in Islamabad by the National Accountability Bureau (NAB) on the charges of corruption in connection with the Al-Qadir Trust, which he owns alongside his wife, Bushra Bibi. Attempts to arrest Khan led to 2023 Pakistani protests by his supporters throughout the country. Khan was again arrested on corruption charges in relation to the Toshakhana reference case in August 2023.

His first arrest came a day after the Armed Forces media wing, the Inter-Services Public Relations (ISPR) had responded negatively to Khan's accusations of a high-ranking Inter-Services Intelligence (ISI) being involved in an assassination attempt on his life the previous year. The Islamabad High Court ruled that Khan's arrest was legal. However, the Supreme Court of Pakistan deemed the arrest unlawful due to the manner it was carried out, and mandated Khan's release. The next day on 12 May, Islamabad High Court granted two weeks bail to Khan. Shortly upon his release, Khan directly accused the army chief Asim Munir of playing a role in his arrest.

== Background ==
Imran Khan became prime minister following the 2018 general elections. Originally enjoying the support of the military establishment and being on the "same page", he later had a falling-out with the country's army. Following a series of defections, he lost his parliamentary majority. Subsequently, Khan was ousted through a vote of no confidence, and he accused the then Chief of Army Staff, Gen Qamar Javed Bajwa, of orchestrating the move. Khan developed a sense of resentment towards the army's influence, alleging that they engaged in blackmail against his government. While his "erratic" policies frustrated the military. Numerous lawsuits and criminal cases have been filed against him ever since he was removed from office. Khan has said that he is confronted with over 150 legal cases. Khan stated that the accusations against him are politically driven and that he had not engaged in any misconduct.

Khan called for early elections and became a critic of government leadership and the army after his ouster. However, in October 2022, he was disqualified from holding public office due to allegations of incorrectly declaring details of presents from foreign dignitaries and the sale of the proceeds. The following month, he survived a gun attack on his convoy while leading a protest march. Following the attack, Khan made the accusation that Maj Gen Faisal Naseer, an ISI officer, played a key role in both devising and overseeing the plan for his assassination. On 7 May 2023, during a rally Khan repeated accusations that he had made earlier against Maj Gen. Faisal Naseer, of orchestrating plans to murder him, and alleged he was also responsible for the killing of journalist Arshad Sharif. The next day, ISPR said "irresponsible and baseless allegations by Khan against a serving senior military officer without evidence were "extremely unfortunate, deplorable and unacceptable". On 9 May 2023, Khan, before departing for Islamabad to attend the hearings of his bail application at the IHC, reiterated his claim that a senior ISI officer was involved in a plot to assassinate him and said, "This is my army and my Pakistan. I don't need to lie."

== First Arrest ==
=== 2023 High court arrest ===
During Khan's court appearance in Islamabad High Court, while he was in the process of submitting his biometric data, paramilitary forces of Pakistan Rangers forcibly entered by breaking a window to apprehend him. Video footage depicted security officers of Pakistan Rangers grabbing Khan out of the courtroom and subsequently placing him inside a black Toyota Hilux Vigo to NAB Rawalpindi.

=== Protests ===
The same day as the arrest, protests broke out across the country, including in Islamabad, Karachi, Lahore, and Peshawar, resulting in eight fatalities. Protests witnessed the participation of families of currently serving army officers as well.

The protests predominantly targeted the army and the extent of such widespread unrest, involving the vandalization of military properties and installations, is a rare occurrence in Pakistan. Repeatedly, protesters stormed the General Headquarters of the Pakistan Army in Rawalpindi as well the corps commander's house in Lahore, which was set on fire. During the protests, there were attempts made by the demonstrators to vandalize the headquarters of the ISI. PTI said in response, the army resorted to the use of firearms to disperse the protesters. Protesters in Islamabad blocked one of the main highways in and out of the capital. People also lit fires, dismantled street signs and threw stones. No police or officials were in the area during the hour-long blockade. Protesters in Peshawar also set fire to the Radio Pakistan premises. In London, supporters of Imran Khan demonstrated outside the High Commission of Pakistan following his arrest.

The Interior Ministry ordered the suspension of mobile broadband services throughout the country, as demonstrations intensified and were staged outside army facilities. Independent monitors reported that there was restricted access to social media platforms, including YouTube, Twitter and Facebook, and total internet shutdowns in some regions. The internet services were restored late on 12 May 2023.

The military, through its media wing ISPR, maintained that Khan's arrest was legal and in accordance with the law. They also promptly criticized the protesters, referring to it as a "black day" and stating that no one should take the law into their own hands and that anyone found violating it will be dealt with strictly. In response, Fawad Chaudhry said that the issue of "legality" of Khan's arrest is not for the ISPR to decide and PTI said it had no connection with the acts of violence that occurred during the protests.

The United States and United Kingdom called for democracy and the rule of law to be respected.

=== Aftermath ===
On 9 May, the KSE 100 Index saw a decrease of 455.68 points or 1.09% and settled at 41,373.81 level. On 10 May, the Pakistani rupee fell 1.3% to a record low of 288.5 against the U.S. dollar.

As of 11 May, a minimum of 8 individuals lost their lives, while over 290 sustained injuries, and more than 1,900 party supporters were detained. In an effort to address the escalating situation, the army was deployed in Punjab, Khyber Pakhtunkhwa and Islamabad the same day. Between 10–12 May, police detained key leading members of Khan's political party. These included former federal ministers Asad Umar, Fawad Chaudhry, Shah Mehmood Qureshi, Ali Muhammad Khan, and Shireen Mazari. According to the police, 9,000 PTI supporters and members were apprehended.

According to ThePrint, several high-ranking Army commanders, notably including Chairman Joint Chiefs of Staff Committee Sahir Shamshad Mirza, Lt Gen Salman Fayyaz Ghanni (IV Corps Lahore), Lt Gen Sardar Hassan Azhar Hayat (XI Corps Peshawar), and Lt Gen Asif Ghafoor (XII Corps Quetta), have expressed their concerns regarding the operation and subsequently declined to follow orders that involved the use of force against the protesters. In addition, Chief of Air Staff Zaheer Ahmad Babar and Chief of Naval Staff Amjad Khan Niazi allegedly voiced their opposition towards Asim Munir. ISPR rejected news that any top ranking army officials have resigned or dissented. On 12 May, Lahore Corps Commander Lt Gen Salman Fayyaz Ghanni was removed. According to audio messages the ThePrint said it obtained, Lt Gen Salman Ghanni opposed the army chief's confrontation with Imran Khan.

=== Release ===
On 11 May, Pakistan's Supreme Court declared that the arrest of former prime minister Imran Khan was illegal due to the use of paramilitary rangers in Khan's arrest. The court ordered that Khan be released immediately after his legal team contended that his detention was unlawful.

Chief Justice Umar Ata Bandial said that the arrest of Khan at the Islamabad High Court by the National Accountability Bureau (NAB) was in violation of the law due to the use of paramilitary troops, and that such actions would have a "chilling effect". Adding "[w]hat dignity remains of the court if 90 people entered its premises? How can any individual be arrested from court premises?" Bandial said the "arrest was invalid, and therefore, the entire process needs to be reversed." Imran Khan was instructed by the Supreme Court to appear before the Islamabad High Court on 12 May. On 12 May, Islamabad High Court granted two weeks bail to Khan ensuring that he cannot be re-arrested on the specified charges. Despite these rulings, the corruption charges against Khan remain in effect.

After being granted bail, Khan said that he had experienced physical mistreatment, including being subjected to physical force and struck with a baton on his head during his arrest. Talking to media, he further said "I am sitting in the Islamabad High Court. They had no justification to arrest me. I was abducted. This happens only where there is a law of the jungle and where the Army abducts [people]. Where is the law? Where are the police? It seems that martial law has been declared [in the country]." In his initial public remarks following his detention, Khan said that the "military abducted" him and said the army chief Asim Munir was responsible for his arrest, saying that "There is only one man taking action against me and that is the army chief." The rapport between Khan and the present army chief, Gen Asim Munir, is widely perceived as strained following Munir's dismissal as Director-General of Inter-Services Intelligence by Khan during the latter's tenure as prime minister in 2019. In his first news conference after release on 13 May, Khan criticised the military's involvement in politics and recommended that it establish a separate political entity. Criticising the treatment received by his party leaders and workers at the hands of the military, Khan said there were parallels between the current crackdown and the events that transpired in East Pakistan leading to the country's division.

On 15 May, a Special Corps Commanders Conference was held at GHQ, presided over by General Munir. During the conference, General Munir expressed a determination to ensure that individuals responsible for committing serious offenses against military installations, personnel, and equipment face legal consequences. He said that such individuals including Imran Khan would be held accountable through trials conducted under the Pakistan Army Act and Official Secret Act.

=== Release reactions ===
The Prime Minister of Pakistan, Shehbaz Sharif, expressed his disapproval of the Supreme Court's decision to release Khan in a cabinet speech broadcast on state television. He claimed that the judges had shown favoritism towards Khan, resulting in "the demise of justice in Pakistan." Additionally, he criticized Khan and his party for using inflammatory language and inciting protests. Shahbaz Sharif stated, "Imran Khan has created divisions within the nation."

The interior minister, Rana Sanaullah, said in the event that the Islamabad High Court grant bail to Khan. "We will try to get his bail nullified. And if he is given bail in some cases and some cases are still left, we will definitely arrest him."

In his social media posts, diplomat Zalmay Khalilzad expressed the opinion that "Army Chief Munir needs to resign, and elections must be posted for a specific date." He added "General Munir has mishandled his job and alienated the public. He also has lost the support of many senior Pakistanis."

=== Analysis ===
Concerns about the way in which Khan was arrested have led some political commentators, lawyers, and journalists to criticize the arrest. In particular lawyers have observed that the arrest was carried out by a paramilitary force and on this basis have questioned its legality, though an Islamabad court has termed the arrest legal.

Journalist and military analyst Ayesha Siddiqa wrote that it is an extraordinary occurrence for a civilian leader such as Khan, who was nurtured by the politically powerful Pakistan Army, to display such tenacity and resilience and that the Al-Qadir Trust case marks the start of a military plan to detain Khan until he surrenders.

Historian Ayesha Jalal wrote that it is important to highlight that Khan's arrest was carried out by the Pakistan Rangers instead of the police. The involvement of the Rangers suggests the potential backing or, at the very least, the implicit approval of the military Establishment regarding the arrest. Consequently, this has resulted in negative public perception for the Pakistani government, as many individuals within Pakistan may perceive it as a manifestation of political harassment.

In his column, Indian journalist Praveen Swami said it was a unique occurrence, where the action taken against a political leader sparked an unexpected, spontaneous 'mini-intifada', directed at the military establishment. Swami said that a considerable number of supporters of the PTI, including individuals from military backgrounds, expressed their protest against the arrest of Khan. And in response to the potentially volatile situation, the military decided to withdraw its guards, thus averting the feared bloodshed that could have potentially caused divisions within its own ranks.

== Second Arrest ==
=== 2023 Lahore arrest ===
On 5 August 2023, Khan was sentenced to three years in jail in the Toshakhana case for misuse of his role as prime minister to buy and sell state gifts worth Rs 140 million he received during international visits. Objects allegedly included watches, perfumes, jewellery and dinner sets.

Following his conviction, he was arrested from Zaman Park, Lahore and taken to the District Jail Attock. Khan said his arrest was due to a "London Plan" to keep him out of politics, a term used by him to refer to an alleged plot between Army Chief Asim Munir and Nawaz Sharif. Al Jazeera reported Khan "has yet to provide evidence of its existence." The 5 August arrest and conviction was criticized by interviewed lawyers for being hasty, the verdict being announced in the absence of the Imran Khan, and for being politically motivated.

=== Reactions ===
On 6 August, a day after Khan had been arrested, Dawn reported that despite heavy police deployment, only a few street protests were reported in Khyber Pakhtunkhwa, and that PTI activists in KPK had "largely remained 'silent' over the arrest of their leader". The BBC said that "there was barely a whimper of protest." And that no major protests had been reported in the country. Analyst Ali Akbar attributed this to the defection and lack of PTI leaders following the May 9 riots and fear of arrest. 24 Digital said "there was no sign of any mass uprising Sunday," despite calls of protest from Khan. At least 67 PTI activists were arrested across several provinces in the country by police.

=== Post-arrest legal developments ===
On August 29, his conviction was overturned and was granted bail, however Khan remained jailed, as the same day an Islamabad court ordered his detention in the cypher case, where he was accused of breaking the Official Secrets Act. Following his arrest, Khan was convicted in January 2024 for leaking state secrets (10 years in prison) and the Toshakhana case (14 years in prison), the Iddat marriage case (7 years in prison) in March 2024, and Al-Qadir trust case (14 years in prison) in January 2025. He has since been acquitted both from leaking state secrets and the Iddat case, and received bail in the Toshakhana case after paying a Rs 1 million bail bond and two sureties. Another Toshakhana case was filed.

== See also ==
- Imran Khan
- May 9 riots
- 2023 Pakistani protests
- Al-Qadir Trust case
- Toshakhana reference cases
- Arrest of Sheikh Mujibur Rahman
