= 2023 Pakistani protests =

Opposition to the arrest of Imran Khan and other arrests of other PTI members

- Part of 2022–2024 Pakistan political unrest and Arrest of Imran Khan
- Date: First phase: 14 March 2023 – 1 May 2023 (1 month, 2 weeks and 3 days) Second phase: 9 May – 12 May
- Location: Pakistan
- Caused by: Attempts to resist the arrest of Imran Khan and aftermath of his Arrest of Imran Khan
- Goals: Demand for the release of Imran Khan and removal of army chief Asim Munir

Parties
PTI	Government of Pakistan: PDM; Punjab Police; Supported By: Pakistan Army (claimed by PTI); ISI (claimed by PTI)

Lead figures
Imran Khan; Bushra Bibi; Shah Mehmood Qureshi; Parvez Elahi	Shehbaz Sharif; Maryam Nawaz Sharif: Rana Sanaullah; General Asim Munir (claimed by Imran Khan); Major General Faisal Naseer (claimed by Imran)

Casualties and losses
8+ protestors killed, Senior leaders arrested; 5,000+ protestors arrested	190+ policemen injured, several military installations and cantonments vandalized, several public properties and infrastructure were destroyed or damaged, Corps Commander House, Lahore, burned down, Radio Pakistan Building, Peshawar, burned down, 72+ vehicles burnt

Casualties
- Arrested: 1300+

The 2023 Pakistan protests occurred after the Punjab Police attempted to arrest the former prime minister of Pakistan, Imran Khan, nearly one year after his removal from office. This came after Khan failed to appear before a court in relation to the Toshakhana case, leading to a non-bailable arrest warrant being issued. According to Khan, he had requested that the case be transferred to a court with "adequate" security, citing that the Interior Minister had stated his life was in danger. The climax of a series of events — including, but not limited to, Khan being charged under anti-terror laws after accusing government officials of unlawfully torturing an aide, his removal from office, and an attempt on his life five months prior — the attempted arrest led to Pakistan Tehreek-e-Insaf (PTI) party workers and supporters clashing with police outside Khan's residence in Lahore, despite the arrest being called off. The clashes, described in international media as "pitched battles" persisted for several days, led to the arrests of party workers, supporters being suppressed with tear gas and water cannons, as well as 54 police officers being seriously injured.

Seven weeks later, on May 9, 2023, Khan was arrested — immediately triggering widespread, violent unrest across Pakistan, with tens of thousands of Khan's supporters participating in riots, demonstrations, vandalism, and clashes with police officers and soldiers. With protesters alleging that Khan's arrest was a response to his anti-military stance, various military installations were targeted and attacked throughout the country. Protesters in Lahore targeted the Corps Commander House, which ultimately sustained heavy damage. The Radio Pakistan premises in Peshawar were also targeted, with protesters setting fire to the main building and destroying dozens of historical audio recordings.

On May 10, 2023 and 27 February 2025 Section 144 was imposed across the country and military deployment was ordered in an attempt to quell the rising death toll. Internet access was blocked indefinitely, with nearly 125 million people being affected by the government's decision to suspend mobile broadband and block access to social media apps. Riots subsided by May 12, with Khan being released on bail following a Supreme Court ruling that deemed his arrest unlawful.

Presently, diminished purchasing power has led to widespread protests in cities where citizens have resorted to burning electricity bills and blocking roads.

== Background ==
These protests are part of wider ongoing political unrest in Pakistan that triggered with the ouster of former Prime Minister Imran Khan from his office through a vote of No-Confidence Motion (NCM). As a result of successful NCM, Imran Khan became first Pakistani PM ever to be removed by the NCM. Leading up to these protests was the 2022 Toshakhana reference case, a Pakistani government inquiry registered against Imran Khan by the Election Commission of Pakistan.

Khan was believed to have been evading mandatory hearings appearances. As a result, the District and Sessions court of capital Islamabad issued an arrest warrant for Khan and ordered the police to arrest him so as to present him for the next hearing. Khan, however, says the arrest was aimed at removing him from the upcoming national election.

== Timeline ==
=== First Phase (14 March – 1 May) ===
Protests first broke out in Islamabad on 14 March when police first decided to delay Khan's arrest. Police and party workers clashed outside of his Zaman Park residence in Lahore, and also used gas and a water cannon on supporters nearby. Police also arrested party workers.

The clash between PTI supporters and security forces continued for two days, during which police and Rangers repeatedly attempted to enter Imran Khan's residence with armored vehicles.

On the second day, Khan's lawyers approached the Islamabad High Court (IHC) and requested it to suspend Khan's non-bailable arrest warrants in the Toshakhana case. In a contrary decision, the high court directed the former prime minister's counsel to move the trial court instead, as the order for his arrest was "in line with the law".

Imran Khan spoke to the nation via video link, urging the judiciary and establishment to put an end to the "farce" and "think about the country". Imran Khan said the case against him was being heard at the F8 Katcheri in Islamabad, where explosions had occurred in the past, and that the Interior Ministry had declared his life to be in danger.

At around the same time, the Pakistani political party PTI also filed a petition in the Lahore High Court (LHC) to suspend the warrant orders. However, on 15 March 2023, the LHC ordered the police to halt their operations in Lahore's Zaman Park until March 16, despite their failure to apprehend Khan. They reasoned that an arrest would interfere with the nearby Pakistan Super League playoff match.

The Islamabad High Court considered a plea against Imran Khan's arrest warrants and asked the PTI to remove objections from the petition. The authenticity of the PTI's footage of armed law enforcement personnel opening fire at Imran Khan's residence could not be independently verified, and it was unclear if it was from that day.

On 16 March, Khan—as the chairman of the PTI—requested again the suspension of the non-bailable arrest warrants issued in the Toshakhana reference case, but this request was denied again by the Islamabad District Court on March 16, 2023. Additional District and Sessions judge Zafar Iqbal announced the verdict and ordered the authorities concerned to arrest the former prime minister and present him before the court on March 18. The Lahore High Court then duplicated its order the police postpone their attempt to detain Khan until March 17.

==== Clashes ====
During the clashes on 15 March, PTI supporters threw stones at the security personnel, while police officials fired tear gas canisters at the protesters. In retaliation, PTI supporters set fire to a water tanker belonging to the Lahore Waste Management Authority, motorcycles, and other vehicles in the area. They also looted a warden's office on Mall Road.

According to Punjab Inspector General Usman Anwar, 54 policemen were "seriously injured" since the clashes started, while 32 officers received first aid from Rescue 1122. The IG clarified that all roads in Lahore were open to traffic, except those near Zaman Park, and the same was true for educational institutions in the city.

On 18 March 2023, the Punjab Police raided Khan's residence, Zaman Park. The police were granted permission by the Lahore High Court to search Khan's Zaman Park residence as part of an investigation into attacks on police units.

=== Second Phase (9–12 May) ===
The second phase of the protests was brief but marked violence and death of dozens of civilians. It was not until 7 May during a rally that Khan accused a senior ISI intelligence officer, Faisal Naseer, of orchestrating plans to murder him. The next day, ISPR said "irresponsible and baseless allegations" by Khan against a serving senior military officer without evidence were "extremely unfortunate, deplorable and unacceptable".

Two days later, on 9 May, Khan was arrested in Al Qadir University Case and mass protests were held nationwide in Pakistan.

After the arrest of Khan protestors alleged that Khan was arrested on the orders of Pakistan Army for his anti-military stance. Protesters started to attack various military installations across the country. The General Headquarters (GHQ) of Pakistan Army and the official residence of Corps Commander Lahore were attacked by the violent mob. In Islamabad blocked one of the main highways in and out of the capital, people also lit fires and threw stones during this early event. One person died in the locality of Quetta.

Protesters in Peshawar also set fire to the Radio Pakistan premises in protest. There were many clashes during these protests also. At around this time, the social media shutdown was authorised, impacting YouTube, Twitter and Facebook.

Former ministers who served in the cabinet of ex-PM Imran Khan, namely Shah Mahmood Qureshi, Asad Umar, and Fawad Chaudhry, are among those that have been arrested during the nationwide protests. The Chief Minister of Gilgit-Baltistan, Khalid Khurshid, was placed under house arrest in Islamabad.

Authorities imposed Section 144 in all provinces of Pakistan, and the Interior Minister Rana Sanaullah requested the deployment of soldiers from the Pakistan Army in Punjab and Khyber Pakhtunkhwa as the police force was deemed incapable of handling the situation. As a result, 10 companies of the Army were dispatched to Punjab after the announcement was made.

The Supreme Court of Pakistan has since deemed the arrest of Imran Khan as unlawful, ordering the Pakistani authorities to release him.

The army was deployed across the country as the death toll was rising in clashes between protestors and security forces.

On 12 May, Khan was released on bail and made his way to his personal residence on Lahore. Once out of prison he stated that "I am 100% sure I will be arrested again." and also noted that arrest warrants will be issued for his wife, Bushra Bibi, and that she too will likely be arrested. In an attempt to quell the situation, the Pakistani government shut down the rest of the internet, which failed to stifle the discontent and further fueled the protests across the country.

Pakistani police surrounded Khan's house in Lahore on 17 May. Authorities issued a 24-hour deadline to Khan to surrender suspects, linked to the previous weeks violence, allegedly sheltered inside his home but the deadline expired without his arrest. He said he asked journalists to come to his home, which led to a de-escalation with police. "So that defused the situation because clearly there were no terrorists. So that's when the police could not take action," the former prime minister added.

==== Prosecutions ====
In July 2024, an anti-terrorism court order linked PTI founder Imran Khan to a conspiracy to incite unrest if arrested, citing witness testimonies and a May 7 meeting where he allegedly urged party leaders to prepare for violence. His bail was denied. On August 25, 2025, a Faisalabad court sentenced 59 individuals, including senior PTI leaders, to 10 years in prison over the May 9 riots, while 34 were acquitted for lack of evidence. The judgment cited a broader conspiracy allegedly planned in Rawalpindi and Lahore, though defense counsel questioned the credibility of the three key police witnesses. Warrants were issued for 75 absentees, and over 160 PTI members had properties confiscated under the Anti-Terrorism Act.

In January 2026, a Pakistani anti-terrorism court sentenced eight journalists and social media commentators to life imprisonment in absentia, ruling that their digital activity in support of Imran Khan promoted fear and unrest under anti-terrorism laws. Those convicted included YouTubers Adil Raja and Syed Akbar Hussain, journalists Wajahat Saeed Khan, Sabir Shakir and Shaheen Sehbai, commentator Haider Raza Mehdi, and analyst Moeed Pirzada. Saeed Khan said he was never notified of the proceedings, while the Committee to Protect Journalists described the cases as retaliatory measures against critical reporting.

== See also ==
- 2022 Haqeeqi Azadi march
- Jail Bharo Tehreek
- Huqooq-e-Sindh March
- 2023–2024 Gilgit-Baltistan Protests
- 2025 Tehreek-e-Labbaik Pakistan protests
