= Bilal Ghauri =

Pakistani journalist

Muhammad Bilal Ghauri (Urdu: محمد بلال غوری) is a Pakistani journalist and columnist. He has contributed to publications including Daily Jang and The Nation, and hosts current affairs programmes on YouTube. Ghauri has faced legal actions from Pakistani authorities related to his reporting and online content.

== Career ==
Ghauri has worked as a columnist for Urdu-language newspapers such as Daily Jang and the English-language The Nation. His columns often address political and social issues in Pakistan. He also operates a YouTube channel where he hosts the programme MBG Speaks, discussing current affairs.

In 2021, Ghauri was placed on indefinite leave from Daily Jang amid inquiries into his online content.

== Controversies ==
In 2019, Ghauri reported receiving repeated phone calls from individuals identifying themselves as members of Pakistan's Inter-Services Intelligence (ISI) agency, instructing him to cease discussing "sensitive issues" on his YouTube channel, particularly his reporting on military chiefs. On 31 July 2019, three individuals claiming to be from the intelligence agency visited his brother's home in the village of Zarif Shaheed, urging the family to convey a message for Ghauri to stop criticising the army in his columns for Daily Jang and on YouTube.

In June 2021, the Federal Investigation Agency (FIA) summoned Ghauri for questioning under the Prevention of Electronic Crimes Act (PECA) regarding alleged defamation in his YouTube videos, which reportedly critiqued state institutions including the military. The Islamabad High Court suspended the notices, criticising the FIA for potential misuse of authority and violation of court orders. Press freedom organisations, including the Committee to Protect Journalists and the International Federation of Journalists, condemned the actions as harassment.

On 7 February 2026, Ghauri was detained by the FIA at Jinnah International Airport in Karachi while attempting to travel to Bangladesh to cover 2026 parliamentary elections. His name was reportedly on the Exit Control List (ECL) since a previous government.

On 6 September 2026, Ghauri was reported missing by his family after he disappeared from his ground-floor office at his home in Islamabad. Pakistani authorities later confirmed he had been detained by the National Cyber Crime Investigation Agency, and that a criminal investigation had been launched after an allegation that Ghauri had violated the Prevention of Electronic Crimes Act by disseminating "fake or false" information. Later that day, a court in Islamabad authorised Ghauri being physically remanded for a further three days. The Committee to Protect Journalists called for Ghauri to be immediately released, stating that the arrest was in response to him posting commentary on X about Faisal Naseer's appointment as national coordinator of the National Counter Terrorism Authority.

== See also ==
- Freedom of the press in Pakistan
- Censorship in Pakistan
