= List of organisations banned in Pakistan =

The Ministry of Interior of Pakistan has banned a number of organizations that have been proscribed as terrorist organizations under the Anti-Terrorism Act 1997.

== List ==
Groups that are banned As of 7 September 2021.

1. Lashkar-e-Jhangvi
2. Sipah-e-Muhammad Pakistan
3. Sipah-e-Sahaba Pakistan
4. Tehreek-e-Jafaria (Pakistan)
5. Jaish-e-Muhammad
6. Haji Namdar Group
7. Tehreek-i-Taliban Pakistan
8. Islami Tehreek Pakistan
9. Tehreek-e-Nafaz-e-Shariat-e-Mohammadi
10. Al-Qa'ida
11. Ansar ul Islam
12. Hizb ut-Tahrir
13. Balochistan Liberation Army
14. Balochistan Liberation Front
15. Lashkar-e-Balochistan
16. Balochistan Liberation United Front
17. Peoples' Aman Committee
18. Al-Haramain Foundation
19. Rabita Trust
20. Baloch Republican Party
21. Balochistan United Army
22. East Turkemenistan Islamic Movement
23. Islamic Movement of Uzbekistan
24. Islamic Jihad Union
25. Baloch Student Organization Azad
26. United Baloch Army
27. Jeay Sindh Muttahida Mahaz
28. Islamic State (Daish/ISIL/IS/ISIS)
29. Jamaat-ul-Ahrar
30. Tehreek-e-Azaadi Jammu and Kashmir
31. Jundallah
32. Falah-e-Insaniat Foundation
33. Pak Turk International CAG Education Foundation
34. Balochistan RaajiAjoi-R-Sangar
35. Jeay Sindh Quami Mahaz- Aresar Group
36. Sindhu Desh Liberation Army
37. Ghazi Force

== See also ==
- Terrorism in Pakistan
- List of terrorist incidents in Pakistan
- National Counter Terrorism Authority
- Counter Terrorism Department
- Rangers Anti-Terrorism Wing
