= Al-Qadir Trust case =

Legal case involving Imran Khan

The Al-Qadir Trust case, also known as the £190 million National Crime Agency (NCA) scam, was a corruption case in Pakistan. The case was investigated by the National Accountability Bureau and involved the former prime minister Imran Khan, and Malik Riaz, head of the real estate company Bahria Town.

In 2019, a £190 million settlement received by the UK National Crime Agency (NCA) from Riaz's family was returned to the government of Pakistan, as the affected state in a money laundering investigation. The money was deposited into a Supreme Court account designated for fines imposed on Bahria Town. The case alleged that Al-Qadir Trust received land from the company in exchange for Khan's assistance.

Imran Khan was arrested in 2023, and was convicted in 2025 along with his wife and fellow trust operator Bushra Bibi. Bibi was sentenced to 7 years in prison and Khan was sentenced to 14 years, compounding existing prison sentences.

== Background ==
Property tycoon Malik Riaz handed over assets worth £190 million to the National Crime Agency (NCA) of the United Kingdom during the Pakistan Tehreek-e-Insaf (PTI) administration. The assets would be transferred to the Pakistani government, according to the NCA. The agreement was regarded as a civil settlement and did not indicate guilt.

On 3 December 2019, then Prime Minister Imran Khan received approval from his cabinet for the settlement with the UK crime agency without revealing the specifics of the private accord. According to the arrangement, the money would be presented to the Supreme Court on Malik Riaz's behalf.

In the weeks that followed the decision, Islamabad saw the founding of the Al-Qadir Trust. Members of the trust have been named as PTI leaders Zulfi Bukhari, Babar Awan, Bushra Bibi, and her close friend Farah Khan. Malik Riaz allegedly gave up the land for the construction of an educational institution in exchange for legal protection for the monies he had.

== Investigation and charges ==
The Al-Qadir Trust case was the subject of an investigation by the National Accountability Bureau (NAB), which focused on claims of the abuse of authority in the process of retrieving monies from the UK crime agency. After significant evidence surfaced, the investigation subsequently developed into a full-fledged inquiry.

The case implicated Imran Khan, Bushra Bibi, Barrister Shahzad Akbar, and Malik Riaz as suspects. Allegations against them included accepting unauthorised advantages in the form of land for the construction of Al-Qadir University, modifying cash supplied by the NCA to the Pakistani government, and allegedly providing legal protection for the money of the property tycoon.

== Reactions ==
In January 2025, Sayed Zulfiqar Bukhari, a close aide to Imran Khan, claimed he was pressured to testify against the former prime minister in the Al-Qadir Trust case. In an interview with The Independent, Bukhari alleged threats to his family, loss of property, and financial pressure, alongside offers of leniency, which he refused. He described the case—centered on the repatriation of £190 million from the UK—as politically motivated and lacking evidence of personal gain. Imran Khan, speaking from prison, confirmed Bukhari’s claims.

== Legal actions ==
On 9 May 2023, Rangers officers detained Imran Khan outside the Islamabad High Court, where he had gone to request bail in a number of cases brought against him, including the Al-Qadir Trust case. On 11 May, though, the Supreme Court ruled that his arrest was unlawful and ordered his release.

Imran Khan was granted interim release by the Islamabad High Court in the Al-Qadir Trust case for a period of two weeks, and the court also prohibited arresting him in any other case until 15 May.

Imran Khan was arrested by NAB on 13 November 2023. Bushra was also interrogated. On 1 December 2023, NAB filed the reference in Accountability court against them. The couple were indicted on 27 February 2024.

On 15 May 2024, Imran Khan was granted bail by the Islamabad High Court.

On 17 January 2025, Imran Khan and Bushra Bibi were convicted. Khan was sentenced for 14 years and Bibi for seven years in prison.

== See also ==
- Al-Qadir Trust
- Toshakhana reference cases against Imran Khan and Bushra Bibi
- Iddat case
- Malik Riaz
