= Shahrukh Arjumand =

Pakistani jurist

- شاہ رخ ارجمند

Special Judge Central
- Incumbent
- Assumed office September 2024
- Nominated by: Islamabad High Court
- Appointed by: Ministry of Law and Justice
- Preceded by: Amjad Iqbal Ranjha

District and Sessions Judge

Shahrukh Arjumand (Urdu: شاہ رخ ارجمند) is a Pakistani jurist serving as the Special Judge Central and a nominee for judicial appointment in the Islamabad High Court (IHC).

== Career ==
Arjumand is a District and Sessions Judge and has held various judicial positions throughout his career.

In September 2024, the IHC nominated him to replace Amjad Iqbal Ranjha as the Special Judge Central to hear the Toshakhana case involving former Prime Minister Imran Khan and his wife, Bushra Bibi. The Ministry of Law and Justice granted final approval for Arjumand's appointment.

In December 2024, Arjumand was among ten candidates nominated for judicial appointments in the IHC. The nominations were made by various stakeholders, including the Chief Justice of the IHC, who proposed Arjumand's name.
