= 2022 Haqeeqi Azadi march =

2022 protest march against the Pakistan government

2022 Haqeeqi Azadi March
- Part of 2022–2024 Pakistan political unrest
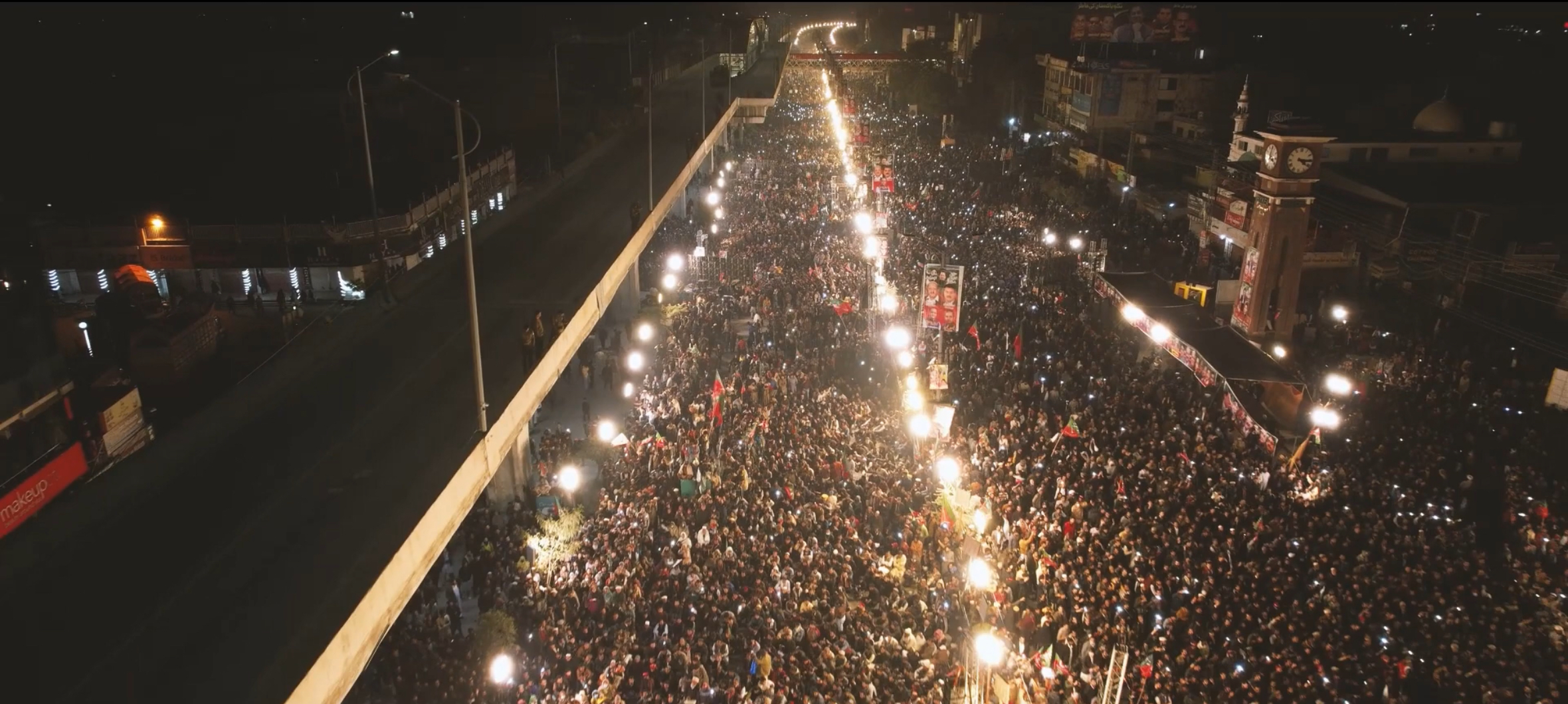
- Date: 28 October 2022 – 26 November 2022
- Location: Countrywide march towards Islamabad
- Caused by: 2022 No-confidence motion; Toshakhana reference case; Economic Crisis; Powercuts, shortages of fuel and essential items. High Inflation, high cost of living
- Goals: Overthrow of the Shehbaz Government; Dissolution of the National Assembly of Pakistan and snap elections; Appointment of new Army chief
- Methods: Protesters: Protests; Stone pelting; Clashes with police; Government: Traffic blockage in Islamabad; Tear gas shelling and Lathi charge

Parties
| Sharif government; Supported by: PDM; PML(Q); MQM-P; PSP; Pakistan Armed Forces | PTI; Supported by: AML; MWM; GDA; SIC; TLP |

Lead figures
| Shehbaz Sharif (PMLN; Rana Sanaullah (PMLN; Supported by; Bilawal Bhutto Zardari (PPP); Mahmood Khan Achakzai (PkMAP); Fazal-ur-Rehman (JUI (F)); Khalid Maqbool Siddiqui (MQM-P); Syed Mustafa Kamal (PSP) | Imran Khan (PTI); Shah Mahmood Qureshi (PTI); Supported by: Shaikh Rasheed Ahmad (AML); Chaudhry Pervaiz Elahi (PML (Q)); Raja Nasir Abbas (MWM); Pir of Pagaro VIII (GDA) |

Number
| 13,086 Police in Islamabad; 1,022 Sindh Police; 4,265 FC officers; 3,600 Rangers | 10,000 protesters; 15,000 Punjab Police for security |

Casualties and losses
| 0 | 5 protesters arrested 9+ protesters Injured (including Imran Khan and Faisal Javed Khan). |
- Journalist Sadaf Naeem killed in an accident

The 2022 Haqeeqi Azadi March (Urdu: حقیقی آزادی, lit. 'True Freedom March') was a month-long march from October 28 to November 26, 2022 led by Imran Khan, former prime minister of Pakistan, from Lahore to Rawalpindi against the Shehbaz Sharif ministry. It succeeded 2022 Azadi march, which took place in May. There was an attempted assassination of Imran Khan in Wazirabad on 3 November, which caused an eight-day pause to the march.

On November 27, Khan called off the march and said he would not continue to Islamabad. Instead, Khan announced the resignation of PTI from all assemblies and pushed for the dissolution of the provincial assemblies of Punjab and Khyber Pakhtunkhwa to force early elections.

== March ==
The term Haqeeqi Azadi ("true freedom") was first used in May 22, 2022, when Imran Khan declared that he would lead the first Azadi March towards Islamabad, dubbed the "freedom march" in English terminology. It was not until the second march that the term "freedom march" or "Azadi March" turned into Haqiqi Azadi March as evident by Imran Khan's statement on October 28, 2022.

=== Timeline ===
- October 5: Imran Khan tasks party lawmakers with preparing protestors.
- October 25: Khan announces a long march will begin on 28 October, and will end in Islamabad before turning into a sit-in.
- October 28: PTI finishes preparations for the Haqeeqi Azadi Long March.
- October 30: Channel 5 reporter Sadaf Naeem died after being fatally crushed by a container while covering the march as it headed towards Kamoke. As a result, Imran Khan announced the march would be halted for a day.
- October 31: Imran Khan says he is in dialogue with the establishment, also confirmed by Pervez Elahi who said backdoor dialogue was underway.
- November 3: Imran Khan shot at by an attacker at Wazirabad, sustained a leg injury. Khan was shifted to Shaukat Khanum hospital in Lahore.
- November 6: Khan announced the long march would resume on 8 November.
- November 7: PTI announces the long march will resume on 10 November.
- November 10: The march resumed, Chief Minister Pervaiz Elahi announced security measures including drones, CCTV, bullet-proof materials, and the deployment of police commandos.
- November 11: Under Shah Mehmood Qureshi, marchers moved from Ramtali Chowk to Lalamusa in Gujrat District.
- November 12: The Express Tribune reported a return to normalcy as PTI protests and sit-ins on major highways ended.
- November 19: Imran Khan via a video link from Zaman Park called on supporters to assemble in Rawalpindi on 26 November, saying protests would not end until early elections. Islamabad Capital Territory (ICT) administration granted permission for a PTI rally from Koral to Rawat.
- November 26: Addressing a crowd in Rehmanabad, Khan announced that PTI would resign from all assemblies,
- November 27: Khan called off the protest and announced he would not move forward to Islamabad.

=== Stop points ===
- Shahdara Bagh (Lahore) 29 October 2022
- Muridke 30 October 2022
- Kamoke 31 October 2022
- Gujranwala 1–2 November 2022
- Wazirabad 3 November 2022
- Gujrat 11 November 2022
- Lala Musa 11 November 2022
- Rawalpindi 26 November 2022

== Incidents ==
=== Sadaf Naeem death ===
On 30 October 2022, Sadaf Naeem, a journalist for a Pakistani news TV channel died in an accident while trying to cover the march in close proximity. She tried to climb Khan's truck and lost her balance, fell on the ground, and was accidentally run-over by Khan's vehicle. She was rushed to the hospital but was pronounced dead on arrival. On her death, Pakistan Tehreek-e-Insaf's leadership expressed shock and grief. Imran Khan announced a stop to his Azadi March for the day. He also visited her residence in order to offer condolences to her family. The PTI wished for appointment of a new COAS.

=== Assassination attempt on Imran Khan ===
On 3 November, while giving a speech to his supporters, shots were fired by unidentified gunmen at Khan's container-mounted-truck. According to an aide of Khan, the truck was fired at six times. A Khan supporter by the name of Ibtisam tried to tackle the gunman. One other supporter was shot dead attempting to tackle the shooter. In total, nine people were injured, including Imran Khan and Senator Faisal Javed Khan, and one person was killed.

Khan was shot in the shin and thigh on the right leg and was transferred to Shaukat Khanum Memorial Cancer Hospital and Research Centre in Lahore, where he underwent treatment. His doctor, Faisal Sultan, said that X-rays and scans showed bullet fragments lodged in Khan's legs, and that his tibia was fractured. A leader of the PTI said that his condition was stable. He was then discharged from the hospital on the 6th of November.
