= Iddat case =

Legal case involving Imran Khan

Iddat Case
- Court: Islamabad District and Session court
- Decided: July 13, 2024; 22 months ago
- Verdict: Imran Khan, Bushra Bibi declared innocent, to be released as per the verdict.
- Defendants: Imran Khan, Bushra Bibi
- Plaintiff: Khawar Maneka

Keywords
- Iddat, Marriage law, Islamic law

The Iddat case was a legal dispute involving former Prime Minister of Pakistan, Imran Khan, and his wife, Bushra Bibi. The case revolves around allegations that the couple married during Bushra Bibi's Iddat period, which is a mandatory waiting period after a divorce in Islamic law. On 13 July 2024, ADSJ Afzal Majooka announced the verdict and acquitted Imran Khan and Bushra Bibi.

== Background ==
Bushra Bibi's former husband, Khawar Maneka, filed a complaint against Imran Khan and Bushra Bibi in November 2023. The complaint alleged that Bushra Bibi married Imran Khan without completing her mandatory Iddat period. This case was filed almost six years after the couple's marriage.

== Trial and conviction ==
On 3 February 2024, a trial court sentenced Imran Khan and Bushra Bibi to seven years in prison for contracting marriage during Bushra Bibi's Iddat period. The court also imposed a fine of Rs0.5 million on each of them.

== Appeal ==
Imran Khan and Bushra Bibi appealed against their conviction. During the appeal hearing, Bushra Bibi's lawyer, Usman Riaz Gill, argued that the complaint was filed late and was politically motivated. He also claimed that the Iddat period had already been completed by the time the complaint was filed, making the marriage lawful.

== Verdict ==
The appellate court reserved its decision on the appeals and announced that the verdict would be unveiled on 29 May 2024.

On 27 June 2024, Islamabad District and Session court rejects Imran Khan, Bushra Bibi's appeal seeking dismissal of Iddat case conviction.

On 13 July 2024, the ADSJ Afzal Majoka passed the judgement for the immediate release of both Imran Khan and Bushra Bibi, stating that if they are not wanted in any other case, they should be released immediately.

== Controversies ==
The Pakistan Tehreek-e-Insaf alleged that the delay in announcing the verdict in the case was a "pre-planned" strategy. He accused Manyika of using delaying tactics and disrupting the court proceedings.

=== Transfer of case ===
During the hearing of the case, there was a disruption when complainant Khawar Manika insisted on presenting his arguments, leading to a heated exchange with the PTI lawyers. The chaotic situation prompted Judge Shah Rukh Arjumand to request that the case be transferred to another court. The judge referred to the continued efforts of the complainant and his counsel to delay and frustrate the proceedings.

==== Assault ====
After the disturbance in the court room, an incident took place outside the court. PTI lawyers allegedly attacked Khawar Manika. The lawyers allegedly assaulted Maneka with slaps and bottles as they were leaving the court. Due to this incident, a First Information Report (FIR) was lodged against several PTI lawyers, including Naeem Haider Panjotha and Ali Ijaz Buttar, at Islamabad's Ramna police station. The charges include provisions related to terrorism.

The PTI has rejected the registration of a "false, fabricated and baseless" case against members of the party's legal team. He condemned the inclusion of terrorism charges in the case and demanded immediate action against the culprits. Despite these claims, the case against the PTI lawyers is still ongoing.
