= Peshawar Radio Station =

Radio station in Pakistan

Peshawar Radio Station (Urdu: پشاور ریڈیو اسٹیشن) also known as Radio Pakistan Station, Peshawar is the oldest radio station in Pakistan, opening in 1935. When Abdul Qayyum Khan, a political leader of North-West Frontier Province (NWFP), Pakistan, went to London during the Round Table Conference of 1930-1932 he met Marconi, who had invented the wireless telegraph, and requested him to donate a radio transmitter for the N.W.F.P. Soon after the gift from Marconi arrived. The transmitter, personally engineered by Marconi, was installed in Peshawar and inaugurated by Sir Ralph Edwin Hotchkin Griffith, the Governor of NWFP in 1935. After 14 August 1947 the station became the property of Radio Pakistan.

== 10 May Attack ==
On 10 May 2023, the new building of Radio Pakistan Station, Peshawar was attacked, ransacked, and burned down by supporters of former PM Imran Khan during the 2023 Pakistani protests. The attack led to a huge loss of historical archives, which included approximately 2,000 historic and literary books, including those by renowned Sufi poet Rehman Baba and freedom fighter Khushal Khan Khattak. Music records in Pashto and Hindko languages were also completely destroyed.

== Famous associated persons ==
- Patras Bokhari
- Ahmad Nadeem Qasmi
