= Jail Bharo Andolan =

Protest method in India

Jail Bharo Andolan is a method of protesting for a cause wherein protesters voluntarily let themselves get arrested in order to fill the jails of the authority. In India this tactic is commonly used in a peaceful way to protest against the authorities.

== During Indian freedom movement ==
In the protests for Indian freedom movement, Jail Bharo Andolan was used many times by protesters including Mahatma Gandhi and Chaudhary Charan Singh

== During Jan Lokpal Bill, 2011 ==
Social activist Anna Hazare, has said that the Jail Bharo Andolan will begin on April 13, if the government fails the Jan Lokpal Bill. The 74-year-old leader, who was on a fast-unto-death at the Jantar Mantar in New Delhi from April 5, 2011, told the media that people of India would take to the streets. Millions of Indians are supporting him. Hazare announced that jail bharo will be taken up on April 13, 2011. However, he did not proceed with the movement as the Government of India ordered a Joint Parliamentary Committee to draft the bill and to present it in the Parliament in its monsoon session.

On the eve of August 15, suspecting he would not be allowed to go ahead with his indefinite fast (for protesting against government's Lokpal Bill), he called for ‘jail bharo’ if he’s arrested. The public responded with nationwide protests with people from different walks of life demanding his immediate release and voicing support to Anna's demand for a strong Lokpal. This eventually forced parliament to unanimously pass a resolution on 27 August to endorse three key demands that Anna had insisted be included in the draft Lokpal Bill. But by the evening of 28 December 2011, he called off the Jail Bharo Andolan and also ended a fast that he had been undergoing to protest for the passage of the Jan Lokpal Bill.

== See also ==
- Jail Bharo Tehreek
- Indian freedom movement
- Civil disobedience
- Nonviolent resistance
- 2011 Indian anti-corruption movement
