= Tehreek-e-Azaadi Jammu and Kashmir =

Militant front organisation run by Hafiz Muhammad Saeed

Tehreek-e-Azaadi Jammu and Kashmir (Urdu: تحریک آزادی جموں و کشمیر, romanized: Movement of Freedom for Jammu and Kashmir; abbreviated as TAJK) is a militant front organisation, run by Hafiz Muhammad Saeed. It is a front for the Jamaat-ud-Dawa (JuD), the charity wing of the Lashkar-e-Taiba. In June 2017, it was banned by Pakistan after India raised the issue at the Financial Action Task Force (FATF), the global anti-financial terror body, in February 2017. On 8 June 2017, TAJK was placed on the list of "proscribed organisations" by the National Counter Terrorism Authority of Pakistan.

== Jail break ==
Ghazi Shahzad, a leader of this organisation reportedly led a jailbreak in 2024 in the Rawalakot District. Shahzad, detained in 2023 under the maintenance of public order ordinance, has been alleged to have ties with this banned organisation and was under trial at the time of his escape. According to sources, he is also wanted by India.

== See also ==
- All Parties Hurriyat Conference
- Kashmir conflict
- al Qaeda
- List of designated terrorist organizations
