= Humayun Dilawar =

Pakistani jurist

- ہمایوں دلاور

Special Court (Central II) Judge
- Incumbent
- Assumed office 28 November 2023
- Appointed by: Ministry of Law and Justice

Additional District and Sessions Judge

Humayun Dilawar (Urdu: ہمایوں دلاور) is a Pakistani jurist serving as the judge of the Special Court (Central II) in Islamabad.

== Career ==
Dilawar has served as an Additional District and Sessions Judge in Islamabad. He sentenced Imran Khan, the chairman of the Pakistan Tehreek-e-Insaf (PTI) and former Prime Minister of Pakistan, in the Toshakhana case.

On 28 November 2023, he was appointed as a Special Court (Central II) judge on a three-year deputation basis by the Ministry of Law and Justice. According to the notification, his court is located at the Islamabad Judicial Complex, where a new courtroom was prepared for him. As a special court judge, he hears cases related to the Federal Investigation Agency (FIA) and cybercrime.

In December 2024, his name was proposed for judicial appointments in the Islamabad High Court (IHC) during a session of the Judicial Commission.
