= Toshakhana (Pakistan) =

Government repository for official state gifts in Pakistan

- توشہ خانہ
- Emblem of Pakistan

Agency overview
- Formed: 1974
- Jurisdiction: Government of Pakistan
- Headquarters: Islamabad, Pakistan
- Parent agency: Cabinet Division
- Website: www.toshakhana.gov.pk

Toshakhana (Urdu: توشہ خانہ; meaning "treasure house") is a governmental department administered by the Cabinet Division of the Government of Pakistan. It was established in 1974 during the tenure of Prime Minister Zulfikar Ali Bhutto to manage gifts received by state officials in their official capacity.

The Toshakhana is responsible for the collection, valuation, recording, and management of gifts presented to public office holders, including the President, Prime Minister, federal ministers, members of parliament, and senior civil and military officials.

== Functions ==
The primary functions of the Toshakhana include:

- Receiving and cataloguing gifts presented to government officials by foreign dignitaries and delegations
- Assessing and determining the monetary value of such gifts through authorized evaluation committees
- Maintaining official records of all deposited items
- Preserving, displaying, or transferring items of historical or cultural significance
- Facilitating the disposal or auction of gifts in accordance with government rules

== Etymology and historical background ==
The term Toshakhana is derived from Persian, where toshah means "gift" or "provision" and khana means "house". Historically, Toshakhana-like institutions existed during the Mughal Empire, where royal gifts and tributes were stored and managed as part of imperial administration.

== Rules and regulations ==
The procedures governing the management of Toshakhana are outlined in the Toshakhana (Management Regulation) Act, 2022.

Key provisions include:

- Mandatory declaration of gifts received by public office holders
- Evaluation of gifts by designated committees
- Permission for officials to retain certain gifts upon payment of a prescribed percentage of their assessed value
- Restrictions on the retention of certain categories of items
- Maintenance of transparency and official record-keeping

== Public debate and controversies ==
The Toshakhana has been the subject of public and political debate in Pakistan, particularly concerning transparency, valuation practices, and the retention of high-value gifts by public office holders. Several cases have drawn media attention and legal scrutiny, contributing to ongoing discussions about accountability and governance.

== See also ==
- Toshakhana reference case
- Cabinet Division (Pakistan)
- Government of Pakistan
