= Death of Sadaf Naeem =

About a death of a reporter in Pakistan

Sadaf Naeem
- Born: 1982; Ichhra, Lahore, Punjab, Pakistan
- Died: 30 October 2022; Kamoke, Gujranwala, Punjab, Pakistan
- Cause of death: Fall from a container during the Azadi March
- Occupation(s): Journalist, news reporter, model, TV host
- Years active: 2009–2022
- Employer: Channel 5 (2009–2022)
- Known for: Reporting on Imran Khan's Azadi March
- Spouse: Naeem Bhatti (m. ?)
- Children: 2

Sadaf Naeem (1982–30 October 2022) was a Pakistani journalist. She worked as a news reporter with Channel 5 from 2009 until her death. She died on 30 October 2022 at the age of 40 in an accident after falling from a container during the Azadi March II of the Pakistan Tehrek-e-Insaf (PTI) from Grand Trunk Road, Lahore to Kamoke, Gujranwala.

== Life and career ==
Sadaf was born in 1982 in Ichhra, Lahore, Punjab, and started her career as a model on different TV shows but later she joined Khabrain Media Group and was at Channel 5 since 2009. She had two brothers and one sister. Sadaf was married to the press photographer Naeem Bhatti and had 2 children.

== Death ==
She died in an accident on 30 October 2022 after falling to death. She was on her live coverage duty covering Imran Khan's Azadi March II. It is common that reporters are invited up on the trucks. While trying to cover the march in close proximity, she tried to climb a shipping container aiming for an interview with Imran Khan. Similarly as she did the day before. After she fell on the ground she was run over by the truck carrying Imran Khan. Even though an ambulance was called for and she was rushed to the nearby hospital she was pronounced dead on arrival. A journalist reported that a guard belonging to the protest pushed her before she fell. Her husband deemed her death an accident and signed a letter refraining from pressing charges to Mian Muhammad Aslam Iqbal, a Minister of the Punjab Government. She was buried in Lahore on 31 October.

=== Investigation ===
The Pakistani Minister of the Interior Rana Sanaullah deemed the Punjabi administration responsible to carry out a proper investigation. Following, a fact finding commission to investigate death of Naeem was announced by the Punjabi Minister of Law Raja Basharat.

=== Domestic political reactions ===
After becoming aware of her death, Imran Khan announced a stop to his Azadi March for the rest of the day. The next day Khan, accompanied by PTI party officials, visited her family's residence in order to offer condolences to her family. The Health Minister of Punjab Yasmin Rashid and Shazia Marri the Pakistani Minister for Poverty Alleviation and Social Safety also paid a visit to the residence of Naeem's family to offer condolences. Prime Minister Shahbaz Sharif shared condolences with her family on Twitter and announced Rs. 5 million in financial aid for her family. Chief Minister Punjab Chaudhary Pervaiz Elahi also expressed his condolences to the family and offered Naeem's daughter and husband a job in some department of the regional public administration. Elahi also delivered them a cheque over Rs. 50 millions and the Punjabi Government decided to investigate the causes of Naeem's death. Other Pakistani officials assured the state would cover the costs of Naeem's children upbringing and education.

The Pakistan Muslim League-Nawaz (PML-N) however, questioned Imran Khan if dead journalists were his "revolution". Politicians of the Pakistani Government such as Railway Minister Khawaja Saad Rafique accused the Punjabi administration that it has coerced Naeem's husband from pressing charges.

=== International ===
Referring to her death, the UNESCO General Secretary Audrey Azoulay deplored the incident and raised concerns on the working conditions for journalists in general. UNESCO’s mandate to "promote the free flow of ideas by word and image" includes the protection of journalists and media workers against any forms of attacks and reprisals related to their duties. The facts and circumstances surrounding this killing are categorized and archived online on UNESCO’s Observatory of Killed Journalists. The Observatory archives publicly accessible information on all the journalists killed in relation to their duties since 1997, where the Director-General has issued a condemnation.

=== Reactions from journalists ===
Journalists in Pakistan questioned if Naeem's death could have been prevented if media companies had invested more in the safety of their journalists. The Pakistan Press Foundation saw her death as a caused by the non-implementation of the Protection of Journalists and Media Professionals Act. The bill mandates that media organisations must provide journalists with safety training before they can be sent to work in any location. According to the journalist watchdog Freedom Network the law was passed in 2021, but has not come into force since the committee supervising the law, has not been established yet.
