= Al-Qadir Trust =

Pakistani non-profit organization

Al-Qadir University Project Trust
- University building design
- Type: Public Private
- Established: 2019
- Founder: Imran Khan
- Chairman: Imran Khan
- Students: 250+
- Location: Sohawa, Punjab, Pakistan; 33°05′45.7″N 73°26′39.01″E
- Website: alqadir.edu.pk
- Location within Punjab, Pakistan Location within Pakistan

Al-Qadir University Project Trust is a non-profit organization founded on 26 December 2019 by Imran Khan. The trust works to provide poverty relief and promote education and healthcare.

== History ==
The Al-Qadir Trust was founded in 2019 by Imran Khan, who served as Prime Minister of Pakistan from 2018 to 2022 . He is the founder of the Pakistan Tehreek-e-Insaf (PTI). The groundbreaking ceremony for the Al-Qadir University took place on 5 May 2019, at Sohawa, at which the prime minister of Pakistan, Imran Khan, laid the university's foundation stone.

The trust was established to provide relief to the poor and needy in Pakistan. The trust's first project was to build a school in the village of Mianwali. The school was named after Khan's father, who was a teacher. The trust has since expanded its activities to include a variety of other projects, such as providing food and shelter to the homeless, providing financial assistance to students, and running hospitals and clinics.

== Al-Qadir Trust case ==
In 2023, Imran Khan was arrested by the National Accountability Bureau (NAB) on charges of corruption related to the trust. He was later released on bail.
