= Jail Bharo Tehreek =

- Part of 2022–2024 Pakistan political unrest
- Date: February 2023 – March 2023
- Location: Lahore, Peshawar, Rawalpindi, Multan, Gujranwala, Sargodha, Sahiwal, Faisalabad
- Caused by: Alleged attack on fundamental rights Economic meltdown due to corruption
- Goals: True freedom for the people of Pakistan Peaceful court arrests of party leaders and workers
- Methods: Peaceful and non-violent protests
- Result: Ongoing Criticized by government

Lead figures
Imran Khan	

Jail Bharo Tehreek (lit. 'Jail-fill movement') was a protest movement launched by Pakistan Tehreek-e-Insaf (PTI) on 22 February 2023, aimed at countering what the party considers an attack on their fundamental rights and the economic meltdown. It was paused in March 2023 after the Supreme Court of Pakistan resolved elections-related issue.

The movement began in Lahore in February 2023 and involved peaceful and non-violent protests against what the party leader, Imran Khan, described as "sham FIRs and NAB cases, custodial torture, attacks on journalists and social media people," and economic failure brought on by a cabal of corrupt individuals who laundered billions in looted wealth.

The movement was intended to achieve true freedom for the people of Pakistan and included peaceful court arrests of party leaders and workers. The drive started in Lahore and moved to other cities, including Peshawar, Rawalpindi, Multan, Gujranwala, Sargodha, Sahiwal, and Faisalabad.

The Punjab government imposed Section 144 on the Mall Road, Gulberg main Boulevard, as well as outside the Punjab Civil Secretariat, and its adjoining roads to prohibit all types of assemblies, sit-ins, and processions. The movement was criticized by government who called it an attempt to create political instability in the country.

== See also ==
- Jail Bharo Andolan
- Civil disobedience
- Nonviolent resistance
