= Attempted assassination of Imran Khan =

2022 shooting in Punjab, Pakistan

- Location: 32°25′57″N 74°06′55″E; Wazirabad, Punjab, Pakistan
- Date: 3 November 2022; 4 years ago
- Target: Imran Khan
- Attack type: Mass shooting; assassination attempt
- Weapons: 9mm pistol; AK-47 rifle
- Deaths: 2 (including one of the perpetrators)
- Injuries: 9 (including Khan)
- Perpetrators: Muhammad Naveed; Unnamed deceased shooter

On 3 November 2022, Imran Khan, a former prime minister of Pakistan and chairman of the Pakistan Tehreek-e-Insaf (PTI) political party, was shot and wounded in an attempted assassination in Wazirabad, Punjab, during the 2022 Azadi March II against the Pakistan government. The gunman also injured a number of other PTI leaders and killed a supporter. The attacker's name is Muhammad Naveed and another unidentified gunman was killed.

== Background ==
=== Ousting of Imran Khan ===
A political crisis began in Pakistan in 2022 when the opposition Pakistan Democratic Movement tabled a no-confidence motion against Imran Khan. The crisis involved a constitutional crisis when President Arif Alvi dissolved parliament on Khan's recommendation. The Supreme Court reinstated the parliament and Khan lost the no-confidence motion, being succeeded by prime minister Shehbaz Sharif.

Khan has blamed his ousting on an "American conspiracy", calling the following administration an "imported government".

=== 2022 Azadi March-II ===
The 2022 Azadi March-II is a march on Islamabad from Lahore which commenced on 28 October 2022, conducted by Khan and his supporters to protest the government's refusal to hold early elections.

== Attack ==
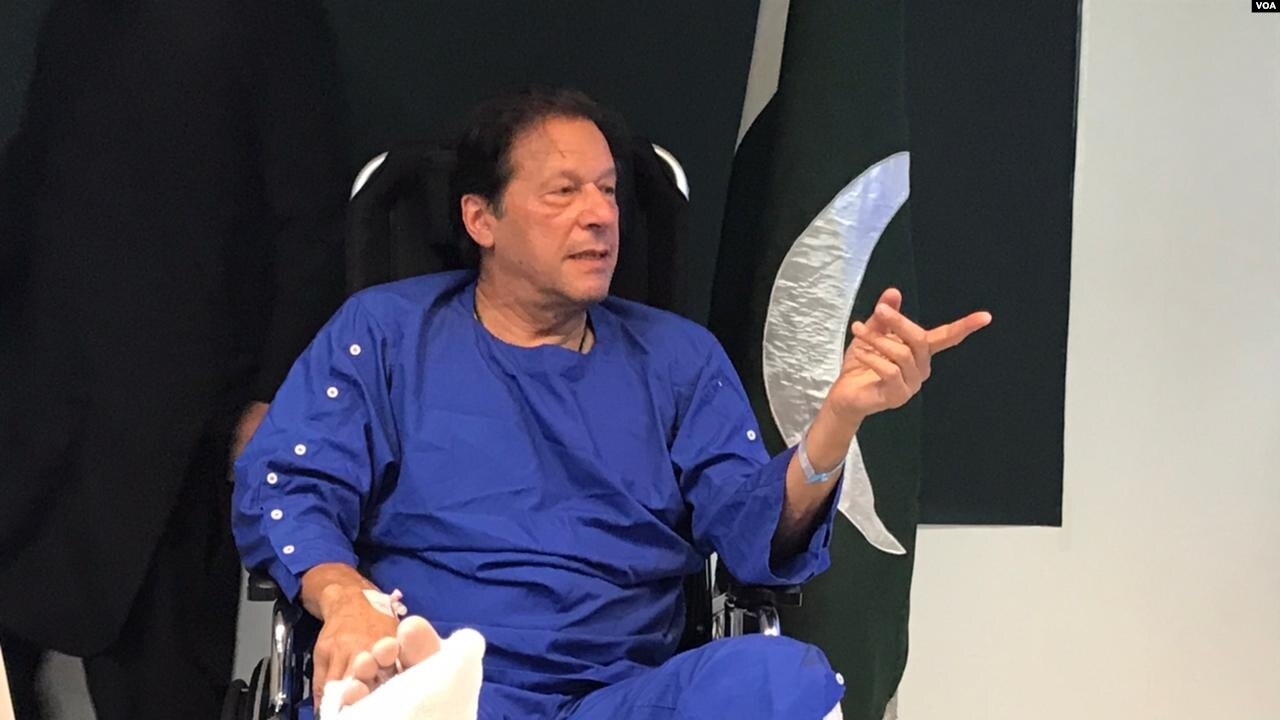
Khan at Shaukat Khanum hospital

On 3 November 2022, while Khan was giving a speech in Wazirabad, Punjab, to his supporters, shots were fired by a gunman at Khan's container-mounted-truck. According to an aide of Khan, the truck was fired at six times. A Khan supporter by the name of Ibtisam tried to tackle the gunman.

Khan was shot in the shin and thigh on the right leg and was transferred to Shaukat Khanum Memorial Cancer Hospital and Research Centre in Lahore, where he underwent treatment. His doctor, Faisal Sultan, said that X-rays and scans showed bullet fragments lodged in Khan's legs, and that his tibia was fractured. A leader of the PTI said that his condition was stable. In the hospital, Khan met Ibtisam, the person who tried to tackle the gunman. Khan gave Ibtisam his thanks and an autograph.

In total, nine people were injured, including Khan and Senator Faisal Javed Khan, and one civilian was killed.

=== Suspects ===
The Punjab Police announced that they had arrested the gunman who had shot Khan, identifying him as Muhammad Naveed. In a video shared by the police, the suspect stated that he shot Khan as he was "spreading hatred and misleading the people", as well as making "blasphemous and anti-religion" remarks. He also stated that he was upset that Khan's march had been playing music and had been dancing during the Azaan. He added that he was acting on his own and only wanted to kill Khan. The video was dismissed by Khan's allies as a "cover-up". The Punjab Police on 5 November stated that Naveed was a drug addict and the veracity of his statements was questionable.

On 26 April 2025, Naveed was convicted and sentenced to life imprisonment for carrying out the attack.

=== Other arrests ===
Two other suspects were later arrested and identified as Waqas and Faisal Butt. The two were accused of providing an unlicensed pistol to Naveed for the attack, as well as selling other pistols and bullets to him for Rs. 20,000. Two PML-N activists named Mudassir Nazir and Ahsan Ali were arrested for their social media posts in January 2023, along with Tayyab Butt who was accused of helping Naveed obtain the pistol.

== Reactions ==
=== Domestic ===
Prime Minister Shehbaz Sharif condemned the attack on Khan "in the strongest words", praying for the recovery of Khan and the other people who were injured, and saying, "I have directed Interior Minister for an immediate report [sic] on the incident." He also said that the federal government would provide all necessary support to the provincial government in Punjab in security and investigation.

The Pakistani military condemned the attack and offered "sincere prayers for precious life lost and speedy recovery of Khan".

The following politicians have also denounced the attack:

- Foreign minister Bilawal Bhutto Zardari
- PMLN vice-president Maryam Nawaz
- PMLN leader and former prime minister Nawaz Sharif
- PPP co-chairman Asif Ali Zardari
- JUI (F) Ameer & Pakistan Democratic Movement president Fazal-ur-Rehman
- PSP Leader Syed Mustafa Kamal
- MQM-L Leader Altaf Hussain

PTI members Asad Umar and Mian Aslam Iqbal released a statement, saying that Khan has asked them to issue it on his behalf. They said that Khan "believes there are 3 people on whose behest this was done – Shehbaz Sharif, Rana Sanaullah and Major General Faisal Naseer". He said he was receiving information and is saying this on that basis. One day after Khan was shot, he stated "I will give a call to march on Islamabad once I get better".

=== International ===
- Canada: Prime Minister Justin Trudeau called the attack "completely unacceptable", saying that violence "has no place in politics, in any democracy, or in our society". He sent his condolences to the family of the deceased political worker who died during the incident.
- Egypt: The Ministry of Foreign Affairs condemned the attempted assassination and wished Khan a speedy recovery from his injuries in a statement.
- India: A spokesperson for the Ministry of External Affairs said that his country is "closely keeping an eye" on developments in Pakistan.
- Iran: Ministry of Foreign Affairs spokesman Nasser Kanaani condemned the assassination attempt against Khan and wished a speedy recovery.
- Norway: The Ministry of Foreign Affairs strongly condemned the attack on Khan.
- Qatar: The Ministry of Foreign Affairs condemned the assassination attempt against Khan.
- Saudi Arabia: The Ministry of Foreign Affairs condemned the assassination attempt against Khan.
- Turkey: The Ministry of Foreign Affairs offered their condolences to Khan and the family of the one Pakistani killed in the attack, stressing the importance of "peace and stability [in] Pakistan" in a statement.
- United Arab Emirates: The Ministry of Foreign Affairs condemned the assassination attempt against Khan. In a statement, it said, "UAE expresses its strong condemnation of these criminal acts that aim to destabilize security and stability, and are inconsistent with humanitarian values and principles."
- United Kingdom: The Minister of State for Asia, Energy, Climate and Environment and Khan's former brother-in-law, Zac Goldsmith, called the attack "appalling" and said, "Imran Khan is strong and will soon be back on his feet."
- United States: The White House strongly condemned the attack on Khan.

== See also ==
- Assassination of Benazir Bhutto
- PTI do-or-die protest
