= Ghazi Force =

Militant Organisation

The Ghazi Force was a Pakistani militant organisation formed following the 2007 Lal Masjid siege, in which Pakistani government troops stormed a major mosque and madrassa in Islamabad. The government's assault on the mosque inflamed the sentiments of conservative and religious elements in Lahore, and the Ghazi Force was formed by Maulana Niaz Raheem, who recruited the relatives of the militants who were killed in the siege. The group derived its name from Maulana Abdul Rashid Ghazi, who was also killed in the fighting.

== Current ==
The Ghazi Force merged with the Pakistani Taliban in 2008 and established its headquarters in Orakzai Agency of FATA. It also claimed responsibility for a blast near Lal Masjid, Islamabad on 6 July 2008 that killed 18 policemen and a civilian.
