= Faisal Javed =

Pakistani politician

Member of the Senate of Pakistan
- Incumbent
- Assumed office 26 July 2025
- Constituency: Khyber Pakhtunkhwa
- In office 12 March 2018 – 12 March 2024
- Constituency: Khyber Pakhtunkhwa

Personal details
- Born: 26 January 1981 (age 45) Swabi, Khyber Pakhtunkhwa, Pakistan
- Party: PTI (1996-present)

Faisal Javed Khan (born 26 January 1981) is a Pakistani politician, marketing professional, and radio broadcaster who has served as a Member of the Senate of Pakistan since 26 July 2025. He previously served in the Senate from March 2018 to March 2024.

He was also elected as Chairman Senate Standing Committee on Information and Broadcasting. Senator Faisal Javed Khan is the most followed Senator in Pakistan on Twitter.

== Early life ==
Faisal Javed Khan belongs to a Pashtun family of the Yusufzai tribe (Khan Khel sub-tribe) with roots in Swabi, Khyber Pakhtunkhwa.

== Professional career ==
Faisal Javed Khan is an advertising and marketing professional, broadcaster, and producer with over 17 years of experience in media, production, and advertising. He has held key positions within Pakistan's advertising and media industry, leading multidisciplinary teams and producing more than 300 advertising campaigns and television commercials, including several award-winning projects for major national brands. His work has been particularly influential in the telecom and branchless banking sectors, where he played a pivotal role in launching several mainstream brands. Khan has received multiple local and international accolades for campaign development and media strategy, including the "Campaign of the Year" and "Best Digital Campaign" awards at Pakistan’s premier advertising events.

In addition to his advertising career, Khan was a radio broadcaster for over a decade and has represented Pakistan at various international advertising conferences. His professional expertise spans brand management, electronic media strategy, brand development, and strategic communication.

== Political career ==
Faisal Javed Khan began his political career in 1996 with Pakistan Tehreek-e-Insaf (PTI). He has hosted more than 500 PTI political rallies across Pakistan and known as the "Voice of PTI".

As of February 2018, he was serving as a member of the core and central executive committees of the PTI and its central additional secretary information. Khan has also campaigned for PTI Chief Imran Khan in 1997, 2002, 2013 and 2018 general elections. Faisal Javed Khan spoke at the European Parliament as a part of Parliamentarians from European Union member states and 18 Asian countries in the two day Asia-Europe Parliamentary Partnership (ASEP) meetings that debated the environmental challenges faced by Asia and Europe. He also moderated Imran Khan's big rally at Capital One Arena in the downtown Washington, DC in 2019.

Faisal Javed Khan was elected to the Senate of Pakistan as a candidate of PTI on general seat from Khyber Pakhtunkhwa in the 2018 Pakistani Senate election. He took oath as Senator on 12 March 2018.

Khan was injured during the attempted assassination of Imran Khan. Amid political unrest in Pakistan, Faisal argued in support for Imran Khan, and helped the Pakistan Tehreek-e-Insaf organize further rallies across the country. He was also granted an arrest warrant which was later suspended by the District Judicial Complex due to an alleged relation to the May 9 riots. Faisal was in hiding for the entire aftermath of the riots but resurfaced and secured a bail from the Peshawar High Court (PHC).

He was elected as Senator in 2025 for six year Term.
