= Rehmanabad =

- Location in Pakistan
- Coordinates: 33°38′16″N 73°4′31″E
- Country: Pakistan
- Region: Punjab
- District: Chakwal District
- Tehsil: Talagang Tehsil
- Boroughs: 10
- Elevation: 217 m (712 ft)
- Time zone: UTC+5 (PKT)

Rehmanabad is a village of Talagang Tehsil, Chakwal District in the Punjab province of Pakistan. It lies 25 km north-west from Talagang city and 10 km north-west to Kotsarang village. It used to be called Loteri, which means (Loh(iron) Dheri(heap). Inhabitants of this village are mostly Awan and the primary occupations in the village are farming and military service. Major crops are wheat and peanuts. Nearby villages are Kotsarang, Dhok Pathan, Dohler and Mongla.
