= District Jail Attock =

Prison in Attock, Pakistan

- Interactive map of District Jail Attock
- Location: Attock, Punjab, Pakistan; 33.777416°N 72.369947°E
- Status: Operational
- Security class: Minimum–maximum
- Capacity: 539
- Population: 804 (November 2026)
- Opened: 1905-06
- Managed by: Punjab Prisons, Government of the Punjab
- Warden: Imran Naveed Ashraf (Superintendent Jail)

District Jail Attock is a century-old prison located in Attock, Pakistan. It is administered by the Punjab Prisons.

It was commissioned in 1905-06 and encompasses an area of over 67 acre. The prison is authorized to accommodate 539 prisoners. It holds a rehabilitation centre for addict prisoners and an Adult Literacy Centre.

== Notable inmates ==
=== Former ===
- Hanif Abbasi, Pakistan's railway minister
- Imran Riaz Khan, Pakistani journalist
- Shah Mehmood Qureshi, Pakistan's former foreign minister
- Imran Khan, Pakistan's former Prime Minister
- Azam Swati, Pakistan's Senator and former federal minister
