= Faisal Sultan =

Pakistani politician

Dr. Faisal Sultan
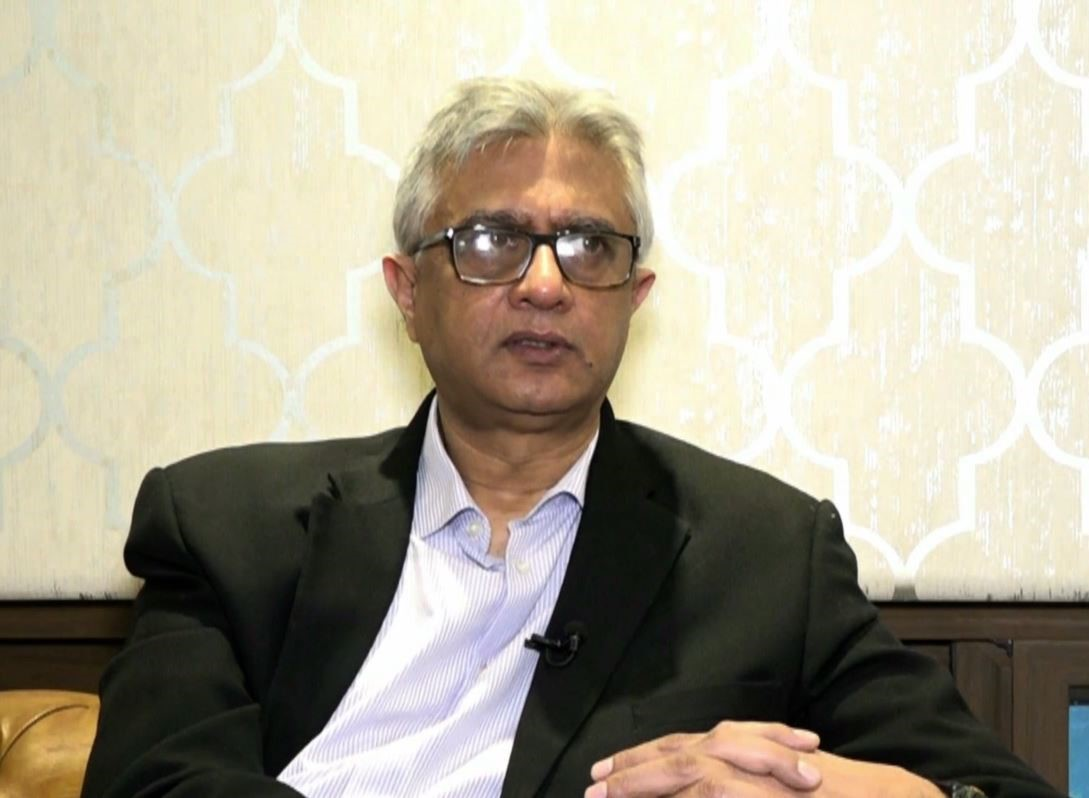

Former Special Assistant to the Prime Minister for National Health Services, Regulation & Coordination
- In office 3 August 2020 – 10 April 2022
- President: Arif Alvi
- Prime Minister: Imran Khan
- Preceded by: Zafar Mirza (Special Assistant to Prime Minister for Health)
- Succeeded by: Abdul Qadir Patel (Special Assistant to Prime Minister for Health)

Personal details
- Party: PTI (2020-present)

Dr. Faisal Sultan is a Pakistani infectious diseases physician and is the Chief Executive Officer of Shaukat Khanum Memorial Cancer Hospital and Research Centre. He served as the Special Assistant to the Prime Minister on National Health Services in Pakistan during the Covid-19 pandemic.

== Education ==
Sultan studied at the Cadet College Hasan Abdal in Pakistan and graduated from the King Edward Medical College in Pakistan. He subsequently trained in the United States in internal medicine at the University of Connecticut (1989-1992) and in infectious disease at Washington University School of Medicine (1992-1995). He is certified by the American Board of Internal Medicine in internal medicine and infectious diseases. Sultan is a Fellow of the Royal College of Physicians Edinburgh, UK and of the College of Physicians and Surgeons in Pakistan.

== Career ==
Sultan has served at the Shaukat Khanum Memorial Cancer Hospital and Research Centre since 1995 as an infectious diseases physician. He was the Medical Director of the Hospital from 2000 to 2002 before being appointed as the Chief Executive Officer in 2003. After onset of the coronavirus pandemic, Sultan was appointed as the Prime Minister’s Focal Person on COVID-19 in Pakistan and later as the Special Assistant to the Prime Minister on National Health Services in Pakistan, a position he held for two years.

Sultan has been a trainer and examiner in Infectious Diseases for the College of Physicians and Surgeons of Pakistan and has authored multiple scientific publications. He has also served as a member of advisory committees for various organisations, including the Punjab Healthcare Commission, National AIDS Control Program, Pakistan Medical Research Council, Pakistan Science Foundation, University of Health Science of Pakistan and the School of Biological Sciences, University of the Punjab, Lahore.

He was part of the Core Group for setting Pakistan’s National Accreditation Standards for Hospitals, Ministry of Health. He has also served on the Prime Minister’s task force on health and as chairman of the board of governors, Medical Teaching Institute Khyber Teaching Hospital Peshawar, as well as on the steering committee for the Punjab Health Strategic Plan.

He has contributed towards various global health initiatives as well. In the past, he has served on the Human Papillomavirus Vaccine Advisory Committee (HVAC) of the WHO and as a member of the board of governors at GAVI, Geneva, Switzerland (2021-2022). Currently, he is a member of The Carter Center's International Task Force for Disease Eradication (ITFDE) in Atlanta, USA.
