= National Counter Terrorism Authority =

Pakistani internal security organization

National Counter Terrorism Authority قومی مقتدرہِ انسدادِ دہشت گردی

Agency overview
- Formed: 2009; 17 years ago
- Type: Counter-terrorism
- Jurisdiction: Government of Pakistan
- Headquarters: Islamabad, Pakistan
- Motto: Stand United Against Terrorism
- Minister responsible: Minister for Interior
- Agency executive: Major General Faisal Naseer, National Coordinator
- Child agencies: National Intelligence Fusion and Threat Assessment Centre (NIFTAC); Provincial Intelligence Fusion and Threat Assessment Centres (PIFTACs)
- Website: nacta.gov.pk

The National Counter Terrorism Authority (Urdu: قومی مقتدرہِ انسدادِ دہشت گردی, romanized: Qaumi Maqtarah-e-Ansadadi Dahsht Gardi), commonly called NACTA, is a Pakistani internal security organization responsible for making counter terrorism and counter extremism policies and strategies. It also develops action plans against terrorism and extremism and reviews their implementation. It is mandated to devise a counter-terrorism strategy that should address short, medium and long-term goals and devise action plans for their implementation. It formulates threat assessments with periodic reviews. It advises the Federal Government on making adequate and timely efforts to counter terrorism and extremism.

NACTA was initially set up in 2008, administratively, but its powers and mandate has been clearly spelled out in March 2013, under an Act of Parliament called NACTA Act 2013. The NACTA 2013 Act sets up the framework of the organization.

== Board of Governors ==
Under the NACTA Act, the National Counter Terrorism Authority is to be governed by a Board of Governors (BOG). The Federal Interior Minister is the Chairman of NACTA BOG. Secretaries Interior, Defense, Law & Finance, DG IB, DG FIA and DGs ISI & MI, Provincial Home secretaries and Provincial IGs are Members of NACTA's BOG with two members from National Assembly & two members from senate one each from Treasury & Opposition. National Coordinator NACTA is Secretary to the BOG. He is also Chief Executive of NACTA. Board provides strategic vision to Authority and oversees its functions. It also approves annual budget of the Authority. An Executive Committee is convened by the National Coordinator to perform such functions as assigned to it by the Board.

== Functions ==
According to the law the Authority has the following functions:

- to receive and collate data or information or intelligence, and disseminate and coordinate between all relevant stakeholders to formulate threat assessments with periodical reviews to be presented to the Federal Government for making adequate and timely efforts to counter terrorism and extremism;
- to coordinate and prepare comprehensive National counter terrorism and counter extremism strategies, and reviews them on periodical basis;
- to develop action plans against terrorism and extremism and report to the Federal Government about implementation of these plans, on periodical basis;
- to carry out research on topics relevant to terrorism and extremism and to prepare and circulate documents;
- to carry out liaison with international entities for facilitating cooperation in areas relating to terrorism and extremism;
- to review relevant laws and suggest amendments to the Federal Government; and
- to appoint committee of experts from Government and non-Government organizations for deliberations in areas related to the mandate and functions of the Authority.

== National Intelligence Fusion and Threat Assessment Centre ==
Established in 2025 under NACTA, the National Intelligence Fusion and Threat Assessment Centre (NIFTAC) is a federal-level institution designed to centralize intelligence sharing and coordinate Pakistan’s counterterrorism strategy. It connects over 50 federal and provincial entities and is supported by six Provincial Intelligence Fusion and Threat Assessment Centres (PIFTACs), ensuring integrated threat assessment and response across all regions.

== List of National Coordinators ==
- Mr. Tariq Pervaiz, PSP (2010)
- Mr. Zafarullah Khan, PSP (2010-2011)
- Dr. Waseem Kousar, PSP (2011)
- Mr. Malik Muhammad Iqbal, PSP (2011)
- Mr. Khwaja Khalid Farooq, PSP (2011-2013)
- Dr. Syed Hyder Ali, PAS (2013)
- Mr. Aamir Ashraf Khwaja, PAS (2013-2014)
- Mr. Shahid Khan, PAS (2014)
- Mr. Hamid Ali Khan, PAS (2014-2015)
- Lt. Cdr. (R) Ihsan Ghani, PSP (2015-2018)
- Dr. Muhammad Suleman Khan, PSP (2018)
- Mr. Mehr Khaliq Dad Lak, PSP (2018-2022)
- Mr. Muhammad Tahir Rai, PSP (2022-2024)
- Flt. Lt. (R) Muhammad Khalid Khattak, PSP (2024)
- Dr. Khalid Chauhan, PhD, UNM, PPM (Acting) (2024-2025)
- Mr. Jawad Ahmad Dogar, PSP (2025-2026)
- Major General Faisal Naseer (2026-)

== See also ==
- Counter Terrorism Department
- List of terrorist organisations banned in Pakistan
- National Intelligence Fusion and Threat Assessment Centre (NIFTAC)
- Pakistani Intelligence community
