= Bushra Bibi =

Pakistani faith healer and politician (born 1970s)

- بشریٰ بی بی

Spouse of the Prime Minister of Pakistan
- In role 18 August 2018 – 10 March 2022
- Prime Minister: Imran Khan
- Preceded by: Samina Abbasi
- Succeeded by: Tehmina Durrani

Personal details
- Born: Bushra Riaz Wattoo; 1971 (age 54–55) Pakpattan, Punjab, Pakistan
- Party: PTI (2018-present)
- Spouse(s): Khawar Maneka (m. 1989; div. 2017) Imran Khan (m. 2018)
- Children: 5

Bushra Bibi Khan (Note: Urdu: بشریٰ بی بی) (née Bushra Riaz Wattoo, born 1971) is a Pakistani faith healer (Note: Multiple references: Drury, Flora (1 February 2024). "Bushra Bibi: Who is the faith healer wife of Pakistani ex-PM Imran Khan?". BBC.; "Bushra Khan, Imran Khan's wife, marches on Pakistan's capital". The Economist. 5 December 2024. "A self-styled faith healer, she has been the subject of lurid gossip accusing her of practising witchcraft"; Mansour, Juliette (28 November 2024). "Imran Khan's wife Bushra Bibi emerges as Pakistan protest figure". Mercury News. "A faith healer, Bibi and Khan became close when he turned to her for spiritual guidance in his political career.") and politician. She is married to Imran Khan who was the prime minister of Pakistan from 2018 to 2022.

== Early life and family ==
Bushra Bibi was born in the early 1970s into a conservative, politically active landowning family in central Punjab. Her family belongs to the Wattoo clan, a landowning Jat group, of whom the Manekas are a sub-clan. Her grandfather was a landowner, while her father later sold his land and opened a Chinese restaurant.

Bushra and her sister, Maryam, were sent to Lahore to live with relatives. According to her sister, they attended Queen Mary College, though the school reportedly has no record of their attendance. Accounts from this period describe her as "ultra-modern," and her sister has disputed claims that she "ran wild" in her youth.

== Career as a faith healer ==
Disturbed by her troubled arranged marriage, Bushra Bibi turned to Sufi Islam. As her children grew older, she spent increasing time at the shrine of Baba Farid, a 12th-century Sufi poet and mystic, in Pakpattan.

By her late 20s, Bushra Bibi had begun establishing herself as a pir, advising a close circle of friends and family. She reportedly dedicated time to all-night prayers and the study of Islamic mysticism. During this period, she also led pilgrimages. Her then-husband, Maneka, once accompanied her on a week-long barefoot pilgrimage from Lahore to Pakpattan. According to her sister, Bushra Bibi became increasingly religious, and more people began seeking her advice.

== Personal life ==
=== First marriage ===
In 1989, at the age of 18, Bushra had an arranged marriage with Khawar Maneka, a son of Ghulam Muhammad Maneka and brother of Ahmad Raza Maneka. After the marriage, she managed the Maneka family's homes in Lahore, Islamabad, and their ancestral town of Pakpattan. The couple had five children, two sons and three daughters. Her eldest daughter Mehru Maneka is the daughter-in-law of politician Mian Atta Muhammad Manika and has been a member of PTI since 2018. The couple divorced in 2017.

=== Second marriage ===
Khan and Bushra met in 2015 through Bushra's sister, Maryam Riaz Wattoo. Wattoo has been involved in Pakistan Tehreek-e-Insaf (PTI). She has worked in the United Arab Emirates as an advisor for higher education affairs in the Ministry of Education. She also led the Higher Education Development Project, a World Bank-funded initiative in Pakistan.

Khan was a frequent visitor to Baba Farid's shrine in Pakpattan, where he would pay homage to the renowned 12th-century Sufi saint. He usually visited the town in the evening escorted by his private guards, and would later stay for a few hours at the Maneka family's residence, his local hosts, after which he would return to Islamabad. The Manekas were influential locally, and shared a "spiritual relationship" with Khan. Bushra, married to Khawar Maneka at the time, was known as a Sufi scholar, spiritual mentor, and faith healer, also referred to as a pir or murshid, and this is what reportedly drew Khan closer to her. She has been described as a leader of pilgrimages to Baba Farid's shrine.

During his visits, Khan would often consult her on spiritual matters whenever he found himself in a "difficult situation." It was reported that Khan first interacted with Bibi shortly before the 2015 by-election in Lodhran for the NA-154 constituency. He became "very pleased" when his candidate Jahangir Tareen won that election, which she had correctly predicted, and started visiting and consulting her more regularly for guidance. As the visits became more frequent, their personal understanding, love and affection also grew. However, the prospect of marriage never surfaced until Khan learnt of Bushra's divorce. A few months after their marriage, the couple went on a pilgrimage to Makkah.

My interest in Sufism started 30 years ago. It changed my life. Sufism is an order with many levels, but I have never met anyone who is as high as my wife. My interest in her began with that.

— Imran Khan, 2018

Bushra has been described as an introvert who prefers to stay at home rather than attending social functions and gatherings very frequently, to which Khan admittedly has no objections, as he himself is "past the age of socialising". With regards to her marriage with Imran, Bibi has clarified that, contrary to some reports in the media, her marriage to Imran took place seven months after the ‘iddat period’ following the dissolution of her first marriage.

== Involvement in politics ==
Bushra was noted as the first niqab-wearing spouse of a Pakistani prime minister. Bibi stated that her decision to wear a niqab is a personal choice in line with religious teachings and that she is not seeking to impose it on anyone else. Shortly after Khan took office, the media quoted Bibi as being "afraid" and commenting, "Power comes and goes."

During the premiership of Imran Khan, Bushra Bibi's influence extended directly to matters of state and party politics. According to close aides, she influenced major political decisions, such as ministerial appointments, and during some political meetings, she would listen from behind a screen and provide guidance to Imran Khan. Aun Chaudhry, a former political aide to Khan, claimed he was dismissed from the prime minister's oath-taking ceremony based on an undisclosed "dream" Bushra Bibi had. Other accounts claimed she would advise Khan on "propitious" times to travel, allegedly delaying a flight for four hours.

=== November 2024 PTI protest ===
Bushra Bibi played a prominent role in the November 2024 PTI protest, entering Islamabad alongside thousands of PTI supporters who breached security barricades to demand Imran Khan's release. She addressed the crowd near D-Chowk, a central location close to parliament, and called for holding the protest there. According to sources, this decision contrasted with earlier instructions attributed to Imran Khan, which suggested gathering on the city's outskirts. When the government launched a midnight crackdown involving tear gas, rubber bullets, and arrests of protesters, she left the protest site. Her departure prompted criticism from some protesters who felt abandoned during the violent clashes. The protests turned violent, resulting in at least six deaths. PTI eventually ended the protests. Bushra Bibi's active involvement marked a shift from her previously private role.

== Trials ==
=== Iddat case ===
On 4 February 2024, Bushra Bibi was sentenced to seven years in prison along with her husband, Imran Khan, by a local court for violating Section 496 of the Pakistan Penal Code by marrying during her Iddat period. Judge Qudratullah also invalidated their initial marriage dated 1 January 2018, and imposed a fine of Rs 0.5 million on each. The court concluded that Khan and Bibi had knowingly engaged in an unlawful marriage on 1 January 2018. Despite the couple's claim that a February 2018 ceremony was a non-marital religious event, the judge determined it was a valid marriage based on witness testimonies and rejected their claims that it occurred post-Iddat. However, on 13 July 2024, ADSJ Afzal Majoka dismissed the case and ordered their immediate release.

=== Al-Qadir Trust case ===
The Al-Qadir Trust case, commonly known as the £190m case involved allegations that Khan and some others in 2019 misappropriated Rs50 billion — amounting to £190 million at the time — sent by Britain's National Crime Agency (NCA) to the Pakistani government during his tenure as the country's prime minister.

Imran Khan was arrested by NAB on 13 November 2023. Bushra was also interrogated. On 1 December 2023 NAB filed the reference in Accountability court against them. The couple were indicted on 27 February 2024.

On 17 January 2025, Imran Khan was sentenced to 14 years' imprisonment over the Al-Qadir Trust case, while Bushra Bibi was sentenced to seven years' imprisonment in the same case.

In July 2025, Bushra Bibi and her husband, former prime minister Imran Khan, filed fresh petitions in the Islamabad High Court seeking urgent hearings for the suspension of their convictions in the £190 million case. Filed through Barrister Salman Safdar, the petitions alleged that the National Accountability Bureau (NAB) was deliberately delaying proceedings through repeated adjournments, despite earlier court assurances.

The delay has been criticised as part of a broader pattern of political victimisation, with PTI leaders facing legal obstacles widely viewed as orchestrated by the military establishment and interim government. The case continues amid allegations of massive electoral rigging in the 2024 general elections, which critics say were manipulated to sideline PTI and suppress popular opposition.

=== Toshakhana case ===
Bushra Bibi was also given a 14-year sentence in Toshakhana case alongside her husband, Imran Khan, after both were convicted of illegally profiting from state gifts while he was in office.

== Imprisonment ==
On 25 April 2024, Mashal Yousafzai, a spokesperson for Bushra Bibi had claimed that Bibi was poisoned in prison and faced medical negligence after two-to-three drops of "toilet cleaner" were dropped in her meal on 24 February. Yousafzai had also claimed that an endoscopy revealed ulceration and inflammation in Bibi's stomach but authorities barred her from getting a blood test done.

She was granted bail on 23 October 2024 and was released on next day.

In January 2025, Bushra Bibi was arrested again.

In July 2025, former Prime Minister Imran Khan alleged that his wife, Bushra Bibi, was facing inhumane treatment in prison, including the suspension of all basic human and legal rights. He claimed that this treatment was being carried out on the orders of Army Chief Asim Munir, whom he accused of holding a personal grudge against her. Khan stated that Bushra Bibi was being targeted as a means to emotionally pressure him. Later, in his September 2025 letter to Chief Justice of Pakistan Yahya Afridi, he reiterated that she was subjected to "inhuman and degrading treatment," claiming she had been denied access to medical care, books, and television. Khan also argued that, according to rulings by superior courts, female prisoners are entitled to leniency through bail as a matter of right, but asserted that this principle had been suspended in her case.

In March 2026, Imran Khan, in a message relayed by his son Kasim Khan following a phone call, again alleged that Bushra Bibi was being subjected to inhumane treatment in prison. He claimed that she was being kept in 24 hour isolation, with only 30 minutes of weekly contact with him, which was often denied. He also criticised the judiciary for allowing such treatment saying "they have sold their souls for their paid personal privileges".

== Notes ==
Honorary titles
Preceded by Samina Shahid Abbasi	Spouse of the Prime Minister of Pakistan; 2018–2022	Succeeded by Tehmina Durrani
