= Toshakhana reference cases against Imran Khan and Bushra Bibi =

Imran Khan and his spouse Bushra Bibi have been charged in multiple Toshakhana reference cases for retaining state gifts at discounted prices from Toshakhana.

In September 2022, Khan admitted to having sold four gifts, which included assorted watches, a ring, a pen and a number of cufflinks, all of which reportedly profited him more than 36 million rupees. The ECP disqualified Khan under Article 63(1)(p) on 21 October 2022 because Judge Dilawar Hussain ruled that he had not indicated in tax declaration that the proceeds were from Toshakhana. Khan's defence team said that taxes were prepared and filed by his accountant yet he was not allowed by the court to testify to this. Instead, the judge decided to issue the verdict.

It is legal to retain Toshakhana gifts at officially-determined discounted prices and to sell them.

== ECP disqualification ==
The first Toshakhana reference case was filed in August 2022 by Mohsin Shahnawaz Ranjha and other politicians from the coalition government, alleging former prime minister Imran Khan's failure to disclose information about the gifts from various heads of state deposited in the Toshakhana and to report the sales revenue he earned by selling them directly on the market. Lawmakers from the governing alliance, the Pakistan Democratic Movement, gave the reference to Raja Pervaiz Ashraf, the speaker of the National Assembly. Ashraf then passed the reference to Chief Election Commissioner Sikandar Sultan Raja for further action.

In 2021, Rana Abrar Khalid, an Islamabad-based journalist, submitted an application to the Pakistan Information Commission (PIC) under the Right to Information Law for the release of details about the gifts Khan had received. The Commission approved the request and ordered the Cabinet Division to provide him with information about the presents Khan had obtained from different heads of state.

The Cabinet Division challenged the PIC's disclosure order in the Islamabad High Court (IHC), stating that it was unlawful to share the details of the Toshakhana gifts, since the Cabinet Division believed it would jeopardise international ties. In April 2022, after many court hearings, the IHC instructed Arshad Kayani, the deputy attorney general, to ensure compliance with the PIC's order regarding disclosure of the details of the gifts Khan had received since he took office.

In his reply to the ECP on 8 September 2022, Khan admitted to selling four gifts he had received from different heads of state while prime minister. He claimed the gifts which he purchased from the Toshakhana for 21.56 million rupees, later brought in roughly 58 million rupees at a sale. A Graff watch, some cufflinks, a ring, and an expensive pen were included in one of the gifts, while four Rolex watches were in the other three.

In the case, lawmakers from the ruling coalition presented evidence to support their allegations against the former prime minister and demanded his disqualification in accordance with article 63 of the Pakistani Constitution, sections 2 and 3, in conjunction with Article 62(1)(f).

In light of its findings, Khan's admission and the petitioner's evidence, the Election Commission saved the decision against the Toshakhana reference on 2 October 2022. On 21 October 2022, the ECP announced its saved decision applying to the present term of the National Assembly and disqualified Khan for making false assertions and erroneous declarations related to his assets and liabilities for the financial year of 2020-21 in the reference under Article 63(1)(p). It also ordered the reference to be sent to the trial court to initiate criminal proceedings.

=== Appeal ===
Khan challenged the verdict in the Islamabad High Court on 22 October 2022, arguing that he obtained the gifts legally from the Toshakhana and had used the revenue from the sale to repair a road leading to his house, which he said also benefited his neighbours. He also noted that previous leaders such as Sharif, Gillani, and Zardari had purchased expensive gifts from the Toshakhana (including vehicles, the purchase of which is not allowed) for ludicrously low prices: on occasions, less than 20% of the assessed price, with some gifts even being bought for between 5% and 7% of the assessed price. In contrast, while prime minister, Khan himself had raised the retention rate to 50% of the assessed value – the same rate at which he then purchased the gifts. Khan then announced the 2022 Azadi March II to protest the verdict.

== Trials ==
=== ECP toshakhana reference case ===
In keeping with the verdict, on 21 November 2022, the Election Commission sent the trial court a reference regarding the Toshakhana for the commencement of criminal proceedings against Khan. In accordance with Sections 137, 170, and 167 of the Election Act, the district and sessions judge received the reference. The written decision stated that Khan had "intentionally and deliberately" broken the laws outlined in sections 137, 167, and 173 of the Elections Act of 2017 by providing a "false statement" and "incorrect declaration" to the ECP in the details of his assets and liabilities filed by him for the financial year 2020–21.

The ECP alleged Khan engaged in "corrupt acts," as described in Sections 167 and 173 of the Elections Act of 2017, which is criminal under Section 174 of the same law, by making false statements and erroneous declarations. In accordance with Section 190(2) of the Elections Act, the Commission had ordered criminal charges be brought against Khan for making a false declaration.

Khawaja Haris Ahmad was hired by Khan's party, the Pakistan Tehreek-e-Insaf, as its lawyer for the Toshakhana case.

On 30 March 2023, the trial against Khan was delayed to 29 April. On 4 April 2023 the election supervisor requested an earlier hearing, the court subsequently decided on 8 April to hear the ECP's request on 11 April. On 10 May 2023, Khan was indicted by Additional Sessions Judge Humayun Dilawar, who did not agree to objections on the case's sensibility.

The IHC temporarily stopped criminal proceedings until 8 June 2023. The hearings resumed in June, in which Chief Justice Aamer Farooq saved his verdict on 23 June 2023. On 4 July 2023, Aamer Farooq presiding, asked Judge Dilawar to reevaluate Khan's application to dismiss the criminal proceedings in seven days. Judge Dilawar decided on 9 July 2023 that the reference was maintainable and continued with the stalled proceedings.

On 5 August 2023, the Islamabad trial court declared Imran Khan guilty of "corrupt practices" under Section 174 of the Election Act in the Toshakhana case and sentenced him to three years in prison along with a fine of Rs. 100,000. Khan was taken into custody and jailed the same day, while his legal team filed an appeal against the conviction on 8 August.

On 29 August, a two-member bench of the IHC suspended Khan's conviction and three-year prison sentence. The bench also ordered his release on bail.

=== First NAB toshakhana reference case ===
A separate toshakhana reference was filed by National Accountability Bureau (NAB) in December 2023 against Khan and His wife Bushra Bibi in an accountability court for retaining a jewellery set received from Saudi crown prince against undervalued assessment.

On 31 January 2024, the court convicted and sentenced Khan and his wife Bushra Bibi to 14 years' imprisonment and order them to pay a fine of about 1.5 billion rupees ($5.3 million).

On 1 April 2024, Islamabad High Court suspended Imran Khan and his wife 14 years jail sentence and granted them bail in NAB Tosha Khana case.

=== Second NAB toshakhana reference case ===
On 13 July 2024, Imran Khan and his wife once again arrested by NAB in another Tosha Khana Case which is also known as Tosha Khana 2 case. According to an inquiry report valuable items including Graff and Rolex watches, as well as diamond and gold jewelry, were sold without being deposited in the Toshakhana. A Graff watch, valued at Rs100.9 million, was sold for Rs20.1 million, with an appraiser's underestimation indicating collusion. In October 2024, Bushra Bibi was granted bail by Islamabad High Court in this case and a month later in November 2024, Imran Khan was granted bail by Islamabad High Court in Tosha Khana 2 Case.

=== FIA toshakhana reference case ===
In July 2024, the National Accountability Bureau (NAB) initiated its third Toshakhana case against Imran Khan and his wife Bushra Bibi. The case alleged that the couple retained a Bulgari jewelry set—including a necklace, earrings, bracelets, and rings—gifted by the Saudi royal family during their visit to Saudi Arabia. NAB claimed that the items were retained at undervalued prices, resulting in significant financial loss to the state treasury.

On July 13, 2024, the couple were apprehended in connection with the case. Their legal counsel denied the allegations, stating that the acquisition complied with the 2018 Toshakhana policy and that payments were made based on valuations provided by customs officials and independent appraisers. The defense also asserted that appraiser Sohaib Abbasi was coerced into altering his statement to falsely implicate Khan.

Following amendments to NAB laws upheld by the Supreme Court of Pakistan in September 2024, the case was transferred from an accountability court to a Federal Investigation Agency (FIA) special court. Judge Arjumand scheduled the indictment for October 2, 2024, but deferred it to October 5 at the defense's request for additional time. Prior to the deferral, the judge denied their post-arrest bail petitions.

On November 14, 2024, Judge Shahrukh Arjumand dismissed the couple's acquittal pleas and postponed the indictment by four days. In December 2024, Imran Khan and Bushra Bibi were formally indicted in this Toshakhana case.

== Reception ==
International observers such as the United Nations dubbed detention and prosecution in the Toshakhana case as politically motivated and without legal basis with the motives to exclude him from competing in the political arena.

== See also ==
- Corruption charges against Benazir Bhutto and Asif Ali Zardari
