= Iddah =

Islamic period of waiting for widows

In Islam, ’iddah or iddat (Arabic: العدة, romanized: al-ʿidda; "period of waiting") is the period a woman must observe after the death of her husband or after a divorce, during which she may not marry another man. One of its main purposes is to remove any doubt as to the paternity of a child born after the divorce or death of the prior husband.

The length of ‘iddah varies according to a number of circumstances. Generally, the ‘iddah of a divorced woman is three lunar months (i.e. about 89 days), but if the marriage was not consummated there is no ‘iddah. For a woman whose husband has died, the ‘iddah is four lunar months and ten days (i.e. about 128 days) after the death of her husband, whether or not the marriage was consummated. If a woman is pregnant when she is widowed or divorced, the ‘iddah lasts until she gives birth.

Islamic scholars consider this directive to be a balance between mourning of husband's death and protecting the widow from criticism that she might be subjected to from remarrying too quickly after her husband’s death. This is also to ascertain whether a woman is pregnant or not, since four and a half months is half the length of a normal pregnancy.

== Iddah for widows ==
=== Scriptural basis ===
The directive within the Quran (Al-Baqarah 2:234-235), regarding the waiting period for a widow, is:

If any of you die and leave wives behind, they shall wait concerning themselves four months and ten days: When they have fulfilled their term, there is no blame on you if they dispose of themselves in a just and reasonable manner. And God is well acquainted with what ye do. There is no blame on you if ye make an offer of betrothal or hold it in your hearts. God knows that ye cherish them in your hearts: But do not make a secret contract with them except in terms Honourable, nor resolve on the tie of marriage till the term prescribed is fulfilled. And know that God Knoweth what is in your hearts, and take heed of Him; and know that God is Oft-forgiving, Most Forbearing. Al-Baqarah 2:234-235 Translation Yusuf Ali (Orig. 1938)

=== Main directives ===
The following is a summary of the main directives (for widows) contained in these verses:

1. The waiting period (Iddah) of a widow is four months and ten days;
2. During this period, the woman is not to marry another man;
3. During this period, a person may declare his intentions of marrying the widow — in a socially acceptable manner — or he may keep such intentions to himself, yet he should not make a secret commitment of marriage with the widow; and
4. The time and place of the marriage-contract should be finalized and committed to only after the period of four months and ten days has expired.

These are the basic Sharia directives regarding the waiting period for a widow. It is also clear from another directive of the Quran that during this waiting period, the woman should not be turned out of her house.

== Iddah for divorced women ==
=== Scriptural basis ===
The directive within the Quran (Al-Baqarah 2:228), regarding the waiting period for a divorcee, is:

Divorced women shall wait concerning themselves for three monthly periods. Nor is it lawful for them to hide what God Hath created in their wombs, if they have faith in God and the Last Day. And their husbands have the better right to take them back in that period, if they wish for reconciliation. And women shall have rights similar to the rights against them, according to what is equitable; but men have a degree (of advantage) over them. And God is Exalted in Power, Wise. Al-Baqarah 2:228 Translation Yusuf Ali (Orig. 1938)

In surah Al-Ahzab 33:49 it is stated:

O you who have believed, when you marry believing women and then divorce them before you have touched them [i.e., consummated the marriage], then there is not for you any waiting period to count concerning them. So provide for them and give them a gracious release. — (Al-Quran 33:49)

In the Quran surah At-Talaq Verse 65:4, it is stated:

Such of your women as have passed the age of monthly courses, for them the Iddah, if ye have any doubts, is three months, and for those who have no courses (it is the same): for those who carry (life within their wombs), their period is until they deliver their burdens: and for those who fear Allah, He will make their path easy. At-Talaq 65:4 Translation Yusuf Ali (Orig. 1938)

=== Main directives ===
The following is a summary of the main directives (for divorces) contained in these verses:

1. The waiting period for a menstruating woman is, three monthly periods
2. The waiting period for a pre-menstrual girl is, three lunar months
3. The waiting period of a woman who has no monthly courses is three months
4. The husband is more entitled to take her back during this period provided that he wants reconciliation. However this is the case only in case of first or second divorce.
5. If a Muslim man marries a Muslim woman then divorces her before touching her then there is no iddah.

=== Commentaries ===
Imam Suyuti's commentary, Tafsir al-Jalalayn: And as for those of your women who read allā’ī or allā’i in both instances no longer expect to menstruate if you have any doubts about their waiting period their prescribed waiting period shall be three months and also for those who have not yet menstruated because of their young age their period shall also be three months — both cases apply to other than those whose spouses have died; for these latter their period is prescribed in the verse they shall wait by themselves for four months and ten days.

Tafsir ibn Kathir, says of this verse,

Her Iddah is three months instead of the three monthly cycles for those who menstruate, which is based upon the Ayah in (Surat) Al-Baqarah. (see 2:228) The same for the young, who have not reached the years of menstruation. Their `Iddah is three months like those in menopause.

The Tafsir al Jalalyn co-authored by the scholar Imam Suyuti says of this verse,

And [as for] those of your women who (read allā’ī or allā’i in both instances) no longer expect to menstruate, if you have any doubts, about their waiting period, their prescribed [waiting] period shall be three months, and [also for] those who have not yet menstruated, because of their young age, their period shall [also] be three months

== Iddah for pregnant women ==
=== Scriptural basis ===
And those who carry (life within their wombs), their iddah is until they deliver their burdens (Al-Quran 65:4)

=== Main directive ===
Divorced women and widows who are pregnant cannot remarry until delivery. Remarriage cannot take place until a period of waiting removes all doubt about any existing pregnancy.

== See also ==
- Divorce in Islam
- Menstruation in Islam
- Niddah separation of menstruating women in Judaism
