= Faisal Naseer =

Pakistani general and spymaster

Faisal Naseer HS TBt
- Native name: فیصل نصیر
- Allegiance: Pakistan
- Service years: 1992 – present
- Rank: Major General
- Awards: Tamgha-i-Basalat; Hilal-e-Shujaat
- Education: Pakistan Military Academy

Faisal Naseer (Urdu: فیصل نصیر) is a Pakistani two-star general and spymaster who is the current National Coordinator of National Counter Terrorism Authority since September 2026.

== Career ==
In 1992, Faisal Naseer was inducted into the Pakistan Army. His role in Balochistan and Sindh earned him the moniker 'super spy'.

During his tenure as a Brigadier in 2018, he was conferred with the Tamgha-i-Basalat, a distinguished service decoration.

In July 2022, he was promoted to the rank of Major General. In the same year, he was designated as the Director General (Counterintelligence) DG(C), effectively making him the second-in-command of the Inter-Services Intelligence (ISI), overseeing internal security and counterintelligence. He holds the highest position in ISI, second only to the Director General of the ISI.

In September 2026, he was appointed as National Coordinator of National Counter Terrorism Authority for the period of 3 years.

== Controversies ==
=== Controversy ===
The Pakistani senior journalist Arshad Sharif, who was forced to flee from the country after being charged with sedition over criticizing the military, was subsequently murdered in Kenya. In his press briefing, Anjum tried to convince public regarding the fleeing of Arshad Sharif, however, months after the presser, Arshad Sharif's mother publicly accused a number of senior-ranking officers of ISI, including former Army Chief General Bajwa, Faisal Naseer and Nadeem Anjum of conspiring for the "targeted, premeditated, planned and calculated murder" of her son, claiming that Sharif was threatened by the agency after insinuating in a program called "Woh Kon Tha", (aired on ARY News) that ISI and America had played a major part in Imran Khan's ouster through a high-profile regime change operation in Pakistan.

=== Criticism ===
Imran Khan likened the role of Faisal Naseer in Pakistan like the Dirty Harry. He accused Naseer for being behind an attempt to assassinate him in November 2022. In October 2022, Naseer was accused of torturing Pakistani politician Azam Swati in custody. Imran Khan urged Chief of Army Staff Qamar Javed Bajwa to remove him, saying that he's bringing "disrepute to the army, Pakistan and you".

However, when asked to bring up proof in order to back up his claims, Imran Khan admitted that he no had evidence for his allegations against Naseer.

== Awards and recognition ==
- Tamgha-i-Basalat
- Hilal-e-Shujaat
