= Elections in Pakistan =

Since establishment in 1947, Pakistan has had a non-symmetric federal government and is a federal parliamentary democratic republic. At the national level, the people of Pakistan elect a bicameral legislature, the Parliament of Pakistan. The parliament consists of a lower house, the National Assembly, elected directly via first-past-the-post voting, and an upper house, the Senate, whose members are chosen by elected provincial legislators. The head of government, the Prime Minister, is elected by the majority members of the National Assembly and the head of state (and figurehead), the President, is elected by the Electoral College, which consists of both houses of Parliament together with the four provincial assemblies. In addition to the national and provincial assemblies, Pakistan has over five thousand elected local governments.

The Election Commission of Pakistan is a constitutionally-established institution chaired by an appointed and designated Chief Election Commissioner, supervising general elections. The Pakistan Constitution guides general elections in Part VIII, Chapter 2 and various amendments. A multi-party system is in effect, with the National Assembly consisting of 342 seats and the Senate consisting of 100 seats (after ex-FATA merger) elected from the four provinces. The Constitution dictates general elections be held every five years, when the National Assembly has completed its term or has been dissolved, and Senatorial elections to be held every six years. By law, general elections must be held within two months of the National Assembly completing its term.

== History of elections in Pakistan ==
Election	Popular Vote	Seats	Electoral Vote	Result
1947 Constituent Assembly election		All-India Muslim League		Liaquat Ali Khan elected as Prime Minister, Khan ministry formed, 1st Constituent Assembly convenes.
1955 Constituent Assembly election	-	Pakistan Muslim League and United Front	404 MLAs elect 72 members.	Chaudhri Muhammad Ali elected as Prime Minister, Ali—Huq coalition formed, 2nd Constituent Assembly convenes.
1962 General Election	-	150 members elected 6 reserved seats for women	80,000 basic democrats elect 150 member, 150 members elect 6 reserved seats for women.	National Assembly convenes.
1965 General Election	Combined Opposition Parties	Convention Muslim League	Ayub Khan	Ayub Khan elected as President
Election	Popular Vote	Seats	Results	
1970 General Election	All-Pakistan Awami League	All-Pakistan Awami League	Sheikh Mujib is denied his win and Pakistan splits in two.	
1971 By-elections			The elections were annulled after the independence of Bangladesh.	
1977 General election	Pakistan People's Party	Pakistan People's Party	Mass protests due to rigging. General Zia initiates military coup	
1985 General election	Independents	Independents	Muhammad Khan Junejo elected as Prime Minister	
1988 General election	Pakistan People's Party	Pakistan People's Party	Benazir Bhutto elected as Prime Minister	
1990 General election	Islami Jamhoori Ittehad	Islami Jamhoori Ittehad	Nawaz Sharif elected as Prime Minister	
1993 General election	Pakistan Muslim League (N)	Pakistan People's Party	Benazir Bhutto elected as Prime minister	
1997 General election	Pakistan Muslim League (N)	Pakistan Muslim League (N)	Nawaz Sharif elected as Prime Minister	
2002 General election	Pakistan People's Party	Pakistan Muslim League (Q)	Hung Parliament, Zafarullah Khan Jamali elected by the National Assembly	
2008 General Election	Pakistan People's Party	Pakistan People's Party	Yusuf Raza Gillani elected as Prime Minister	
2013 General Election	Pakistan Muslim League (N)	Pakistan Muslim League (N)	Nawaz Sharif elected as Prime Minister	
2013 by-elections	National Assembly of Pakistan: PML-N Provincial assemblies of Pakistan: PML-N		PML-N gains a solid majority in the National Assembly.	
2018 General Election	PTI	PTI	Imran Khan elected as prime minister	
2018 by-elections	National Assembly of Pakistan: PTI, Provincial assemblies of Pakistan: PTI		PTI suffers losses and is unable to retain many seats. Both opposition and Government make gains.	
2024 General Election	Pakistan Muslim League (N)	Pakistan Muslim League (N)	Shehbaz Sharif elected as Prime Minister	
2024 by-elections	National Assembly of Pakistan: PML-N Provincial Assemblies of Pakistan: PML-N		Government coalition gains and SIC-PTI-IND alliance loses seats, no significant changes, status quo maintained.	
Next Pakistani general election				

=== Past elections ===
Between 1947 and 1958, there were no direct elections held in Pakistan at the national level. Provincial elections were held occasionally. The West Pakistan provincial elections were described as "a farce, a mockery and a fraud upon the electorate."

The first direct elections held in the country after independence were for the Provincial Assembly of the Punjab between 10 and 20 March, The elections were held for 197 seats. As many as 939 candidates contested the election for 189 seats, while the remaining seats were filled unopposed. Seven political parties were in the race. The election was held on an universal basis with approximately one-million voters. The turnout remained low: in Lahore, the turnout was 30 percent of the listed voters, and in rural areas of Punjab it was much lower.

On 8 December 1951 the North West Frontier Province held elections for Provincial legislature seats. In a pattern that would be repeated throughout Pakistan's electoral history, many of those who lost accused the winners of cheating and rigging the elections. Similarly, in May, 1953 elections to the Provincial legislature of Sindh were held and they were also marred by accusations of rigging.

In April 1954, the general elections were held for the East Pakistan Legislative Assembly, in which the Pakistan Muslim League lost to the pan-Bengali nationalist United Front alliance. Incumbent Prime Minister of East Pakistan Mr. Nurul Amin lost his parliament seat to a veteran student leader and language movement stalwart Khaleque Nawaz Khan in Mr. Amin's home constituency Nandail of Mymensingh district. Nurul Amin's crushing defeat to the United Front alliance effectively eliminates Pakistan Muslim League from the political landscape of the then East Pakistan.

The 1970 Pakistani general election, was the first direct general election after independence of Pakistan from British India. After a decades-long struggle, the military government was forced to transfer power to democratically elected officials. In East Pakistan, the election was portrayed as referendum on self-governance for the Bengali citizens of Pakistan, who made up nearly 55% of Pakistan's population and were yet not given rights consistent with those of West Pakistanis.

The election was won by the Awami League, having 167 seats out of 313, and Sheikh Mujibur Rahman was to be the first democratically elected Prime Minister of Pakistan. But the military government, at the request of opposition leader Zulfikar Ali Bhutto, refused to transfer power to the elected Parliament, causing the beginning of the Bangladesh Liberation War.

Political parties' performances in general elections under military government(s)
Political parties	1970	1985
Awami League (AL)	160 / 300	0 / 345
Pakistan Peoples Party (PPP)	81 / 300	0 / 345
Jamaat-e-Islami (JI)	4 / 300	61 / 200
Pakistan Muslim League (PML)	9 / 300	96 / 200
PML (Council) (PML-C)	4 / 300	0 / 200
Jamiat Ulema-e-Islam (JUI)	7 / 300	8 / 200
PML (Convention) (PML (C))	0 / 300	
National Awami Party (Wali) (NAP(W))	6 / 300	2 / 200
Pakistan Democratic Party (PDP)	1 / 300	0 / 200
Independents	16 / 300	33 / 200
Total Seats
Total seats in State Parliament	300	200
Chief Election Commissioner(s)	Abdus Sattar	Karam Illahi Chohan
Elections under President(s)	Yahya Khan	Zia-ul-Haq
Voter turnout	63%.0	52.9%

All data and calculations are provided by Election Commission of Pakistan as the public domain. The general elections in 1985 were non-partisan general elections, but many technocrats belonged to the one party to another.

=== General elections from 1977 to 2013 ===
After the Bangladesh Liberation War Pakistan was becoming less autocratic until the 1977 Pakistani military coup after the 1977 Pakistani general election.

In 1988, the general elections were held again which marked the PPP coming in power but dismissed in two years following the lawlessness situation in the country. In 1990, the general elections saw the right-wing alliance forming the government but dismissed in 1993 after the alliance collapsed. The general elections in 1993 saw the PPP forming government after successfully seeking plurality in the Parliament. Prime Minister Benazir Bhutto made critical decisions during her era, ranging from working to strengthening the education, defense, foreign policy and pressed her policies hard to implement her domestic program initiatives. Despite her tough rhetoric, Prime Minister Bhutto's own position deteriorated in her native province, Sindh, and lost her support following the death of her younger brother. Tales of high-scale corruption cases also maligned her image in the country and was dismissed from her post by her own hand-picked president in 1996. The 1997 general elections saw the centre-right, Pakistan Muslim League (N), or PML (N), ging the exclusive mandate in the country and supermajority in the parliament. Despite Sharif's popularity in 1998 and popular peace initiatives in 1999, the conspiracy was hatched against Sharif by General Musharraf, who accused Sharif of hijacking the plane and pressed terrorism charges against Sharif in the military courts; thus ending Sharif's government.

Ordered by the Supreme Court, General Musharraf held general election in 2002, preventing Sharif and Benazir Bhutto from keeping the public office. With Zafarullah Jamali becoming the Prime Minister in 2002, he left the office for Shaukat Aziz in 2004. After the deadly 9/11 attacks in the United States and Musharraf's unconditional policy to support the American war in Afghanistan, further damaged Musharraf's credibility in the country. In an unsuccessful attempt to dismiss the Judicial system, Musharraf dramatically fall from power. The 2008 general elections allowed the PPP, assisted by the left-wing alliance, further consolidated in opposition to Musharraf, though it was plagued with loadshedding, law and order situations, foreign policy issues, and poor economic performances. In elections held in 2013, the PML (N) won 166 seats in the National Assembly and formed the government.

Political parties performances in General elections since 1977
Political parties	1977	1988	1990	1993	1997	2002	2008	2013
Pakistan Peoples Party (PPP)	155	93	45	89	18	81	124	42
Pakistan Muslim League (N) (PML (N))	8	54	106	73	137	19	91	166
Muttahida Qaumi Movement (P)	0	13	15	0	12	17	25	18
Awami National Party (ANP)	17	2	6	3	10	0	13	1
Jamiat-Ulema-e-Islam (F) (JUI(F))	0	7	6	0	2	0	0	10
Pakistan Tehreek-e-Insaaf (PTI)	0	0	0	0	0	1	0	35
Pakistan Muslim League(Q) (PML (Q))	0	0	0	0	0	118	54	2
Jamaat-e-Islami (JeI)	11	1	6	3	0	63	0	3
Independents\Others **	8	38	30	42	28	36	21	28
Government
Government after election	ML	PPP	PML (N)	PPP	PML (N)	PML (Q)	PPP	PML (N)
Total Seats
Total seats in State Parliament	200	207	207	207	207	342	340	342
Voter turnout
Estimated election voter turnout	63.1%	43.07%	45.46%	40.28%	35.42%	41.08%	44.23%	55.02%

All data and calculations are provided by Election Commission of Pakistan as the public domain. All elections were contested under a separate electorate system, the 1990 elections had allegations of vote-rigging confirmed by foreign observers. The 'MQM' contested the 1988 elections under the name Muhajir Qaumi Mahaz, it boycotted the 1993 National elections.

==== 2008 General Elections ====
This election led to strong showings for the PPP and the Pakistan Muslim League (Nawaz) (PML-N), who signed the Bhurban Accord in response to the election results. The election was held in Pakistan on 18 February 2008, after being postponed from 8 January, the original date was intended to elect members of the National Assembly of Pakistan, the lower house of the Majlis-e-Shoora (the nation's parliament). Pakistan's two main opposition parties, the PPP and the PML (N) won the majority of seats in the election. The PPP and PML (N) formed the new coalition government with Yousaf Raza Gillani as Prime Minister of Pakistan. Following the election, Pervez Musharraf acknowledged that the process had been free and fair. He conceded the defeat of the PML (Q) and pledged to work with the new Parliament. The voter turnout for the election was 35,170,435 people (44%). By-elections for 28 seats (23 provincial and 5 national) have been delayed numerous times, with most of them now held on being 26 June 2008.

Parties	Votes	%	Elected seats	Reserved seats (women)	Reserved seats (minorities)	Total	Percentile
Pakistan Peoples Party	10,606,486	30.6%	97	23	4	124	124 / 340
Pakistan Muslim League (N)	6,781,445	19.6%	71	17	3	91	91 / 340
Pakistan Muslim League (Q)	7,989,817	23.0%	42	10	2	54	54 / 340
Muttahida Qaumi Movement	2,507,813	7.4%	19	5	1	25	25 / 340
Awami National Party	700,479	2.0%	10	3	0	13	13 / 340
Muttahida Majlis-e-Amal Pakistan: Jamiat Ulema-e-Islam (F)	772,798	2.2%	6	1	0	7	7 / 340
Pakistan Muslim League (F)			4	1	0	5	5 / 340
Pakistan Peoples Party (Sherpao)	140,707	0.4%	1	0	0	1	1 / 340
National Peoples Party			1	0	0	1	1 / 340
Balochistan National Party (Awami)			1	0	0	1	1 / 340
Independents			18	0	0	18	18 / 340
Total (turnout 44%) Note: Tehreek-e-Insaf, Jamaat-e-Islami, Jamiat Ulema-e-Pakistan, Tehrik-e-Jafaria Pakistan and Jamiat Ahle Hadith Pashtunkhwa Milli Awami Party did not participate.	34,665,978	100%	270	60	10	340	
Source: Election Commission of Pakistan, Election Pakistan: 2008 General Elections Adam Carr's Electoral Archive

=== History of Presidential elections: 1956 to 2013 ===
Presidential elections since 1956
Political parties	1956	1965
Republican Party (RP)	0	0
Pakistan Muslim League (PML)	50	120
Combined Opposition Parties (COP)	0	15
National Democratic Front	0	5
Electoral College
Total Votes	309	190
Presidency
President after election	I. A. Mirza	A. Khan
Voter turnout		64%
Political Party	RP	PML

Promulgation of 1956 constitution, Iskandar Ali Mirza became first President of Pakistan; he was also noted of being the first East-Pakistani Bengali president of Pakistan. In an indirect elections, the electors of the Awami League voted for Mirza's bid for presidency in 1956. Wanting a controlled democracy, President Mirza dismissed four prime ministers in less than two years and his, position in the country was quickly deteriorated amid his actions. In 1958, Mirza imposed the martial law under its enforcer General, Ayub Khan, but was also dismissed the same year. Assuming the presidency in 1958, Ayub Khan introduced a "System of Basic Democracy" which means that "the voters delegate their rights to choose the president and the members of the national and provincial assemblies to 80,000 representatives called Basic Democrats."

Under this system, the first direct presidential election was held on 2 January 1965. Some 80,000 'basic democrats', as members of urban and regional councils, caucused to vote. There were two main contestants: the Pakistan Muslim League led by President Ayub Khan and the Combined Opposition Parties (COP) under the leadership of Fatima Jinnah. In this highly controversial election with the means of using the state machinery to rigging the votes, the PML secured a thumping majority of 120 seats while the opposition could clinch only 15 seats. Fatima Jinnah's Combined Opposition Party (COP) only secured 10 seats whereas the NDF won 5 seats in East Pakistan and 1 in West Pakistan. The rest of the seats went to the independents.

Witnessing the events in 1965, the new drafted constitution created the Electoral College system, making the president as mere figurehead. In 1973, Fazal Ilahi Chaudhry became the first president from the PPP in an indirect polling. With the martial law reming ned effective from 1977 till 1988, civil servant Ghulam Ishaq Khan ran for the presidency on a PPP ticket in a deal to support Benazir Bhutto for presidency. With special powers granted to President GI Khan, he dismissed two elected governms ent durithe ng periof od 1990 and 1993; he too was forced out from the office the same year. After the 1993 general election, the PPP nominated Farooq Leghari who soon secured majority votes in the parliament. Originally elected for five-year term, Leghari was forced resigned from the presidency after forcing out Benazir Bhutto from the government in 1996. In 1997 general election, Nawaz Sharif called for fresh presidential elections and nominated Rafiq Tarar for the presidency. In an indirect election, Tarar received heavy votes from the electors of Electoral College, becoming the first president from the PML (N). In 1999 martial law against Sharif, Musharraf appointed himself President in 2001. In 2004, he secured his reappointment for the presidency; though the opposition and religious alliance boycotted the elections. In 2007, Musharraf again restored his appointment after the opposition parties also boycotted the elections. As Musharraf was forced out from power, Asif Zardari of PPP became president after a close presidential elections in 2008. The Pakistani general election of 2013 were held on 11 May 2013. Problems with providing electricity was one of the major issues with the winning candidate, Nawaz Sharif, promising to reform electrical service and provide reliable service. Mamnoon Hussain won this election.

Political parties performances in Presidential elections since 1971
Political parties	1973	1988	1993	1997	2004	2007	2008	2013	2018
Pakistan Peoples Party (PPP)	451	608	274	31	EB	EB	481	EB	124
Pakistan Muslim League (N) (PML (N))	–	–	168	374	EB	EB	153	432	
Pakistan Muslim League(Q) (PML (Q))	–	0	0	0	658	671	44	–	
Pakistan Tehreek-e-Insaf (PTI)	–	-	-	-	-	-	-	77	352
Electoral College
Total Electoral College	457	700	442	457	1,170	1,170	700	706	679
Presidency
President after election	FI Chaudhy	GI Khan	F .Leghari	R. Tarrar	P.Musharraf	P.Musharraf	A.Zardari	M.Hussain	Arif Alvi
Political Party	PPP	PPP	PPP	PML (N)	PML (Q)	PML (Q)	PPP	PML (N)	PTI
Figurehead	Yes	Yes	Yes	Yes	No	No	Yes	Yes	Yes

Fazal Ilahi Chaudhry became president in 1973 with PPP's support in four provinces. GI Khan was candidate of PPP in return of supporting Benazir Bhutto in 1988. Pervez Musharraf gained political support from PML (Q) as their president in 2004 and 2007; both elections were controversial as leading parties PPP and PML (N) boycotted the elections.

== Electoral system ==
=== In law and Constitution ===
The Constitution of Pakistan more broadly and briefly defines how general elections (to a basic extent) are conducted, giving the time of elections, and the framework under which the elections are to be conducted, in Article 222–226 in chapter 2:

1. No Person shall, at the same time, be a member of, both houses (National Assembly and Senate) or a House and a Provincial Assemblies.
2. When the National Assembly or a Provincial Assembly is dissolved, a general election to the Assembly shall be held within a period of ninety days after the dissolution, and the results of the election shall be declared not later than fourteen days after the conclusion of the polls.

A general election to the National Assembly or a Provincial Assembly shall be held within a period of sixty days immediately following the day on which the term of the Assembly is due to expire, unless the Assembly has been sooner dissolved, and the results of the election shall be declared not later than fourteen days before that day.

— Article 222–226: Part VIII: Elections, Chapter:2 Electoral Laws and Conduct of Elections, source: The Constitution of Pakistan

=== Election Commission of Pakistan ===
The duties of conducting elections are established in the Constitution of Pakistan. Established in 1956, the Election Commission of Pakistan holds the purpose of elections to houses of Parliament, four provincial assemblies and for election of such other public offices as may be specified by law or until such law is made by the Parliament. The Election Commission is composed of the Chief Election Commissioner as its chairman (who is a judge or retired judge of the Supreme Court or a senior civil servant who has served at least 20 years or has retired in BPS-22 or is a technocrat) and four appointed members from each four provinces, each of whom is a judge of the four high courts of the four provinces; all appointed by the president by constitution.

After approving the consultations from the chief justices of high courts of four provinces and the chief election commissioner, the president constitutionally approves the appointments of the designated members of the Election Commission. The Chief Election Commissioner is appointed by the president, in his/her discretion, for a term of 3 years. The Constitution grants the commissioner the security of tenure and financial autonomy.

== Levels of elections ==
=== Parliamentary elections ===
==== Assemblies elections ====
Pakistan has a parliamentary system in which, the executive and legislature are elected directly by public voting in constituencies on a first-past-the-post system through a secret ballot. Article 222–229 of the Constitution of Pakistan forbids the candidate from joining the membership of National Assembly and the provincial assemblies simultaneously. In direct elections, a candidate who obtains the highest number of votes in a constituency, is declared elected as a member of the National Assembly or a provincial assembly.

The seats in the National Assembly are allocated to each of four provinces, the FATA and the federal capital on the basis of population in accordance with the last officially published census. Members to the seats reserved for women and non-Muslims, are elected in accordance with the law through the proportional representation system of political party's lists of candidates on the basis of total number of general seats secured by each political party in the National Assembly or a provincial assembly. The National Assembly has 342 seats, usually elected for five year terms; however, if the National Assembly is dissolved, a general elections must be called within ninety days, according to the constitution.

Composition of National Assembly
National Assembly seats from provinces	General seats	Seats for women	Total seats
Punjab	257	35	183
Sindh	79	14	75
Khyber Pakhtunkhwa	469	8	43
Balochistan	789	3	17
National Assembly seats from territories
Federally Administered Tribal Areas	15	—	12
Islamabad Capital Territory	5	—	2
Specified seats	Reserved seats for minorities		
Seats for non-Muslims	17	—	10
Composition	Total general seats	Total seats for women	Total seats
Total seats in NA	272	60	342

==== Senate elections ====
The Senate consists of 104 members, of whom 14 members are elected by each provincial assembly, eight members are elected from FATA by members of National Assembly from these areas, two members (one woman and one technocrat) are elected from the federal capital also by members of National Asand sembly; four women and four technocrats are elected by members of each provincial assembly. One seat in the Senate is reserved for minorities in each province.

It is the responsibility of the Chief Election Commissioner to hold and make arrangements for the Senate elections in accordance with the system of proportional representation by means of a single transferable vote through electoral colleges. The term of the members of the Senate is 6 years. However, the term of the first group of the senators, who shall retire after completion of first 3 years of the Senate, is determined by drawing of lots by the Chief Election Commission.

=== Presidential elections ===
The president of Pakistan is elected through presidential elections. In an indirect election, the winner is determined by votes cast by the electors of the Electoral College. The Electoral College is composed of elected senators, members of the National Assembly, and provincial assemblies. The president is a ceremonial post, head of state, and merely a figurehead with the executive powers granted to the prime minister, by the Constitution. The Constitution grants both men and women the right to run for presidency. However it states that a presidential candidate must be a Muslim and not less than 45 years of age. The president is elected for a term of 5 years.

It is the duty of the Chief Election Commissioner to conduct elections for the office of the president in a special session of the Parliament and all the provincial assemblies in accordance with the provisions of Second Schedule of the Constitution.

=== Local government elections ===
To decentralize administrative and financial authority, ensuring accountability to local governments for good governance, effective service delivery, and transparent decision-making through institutionalized participation at the grassroots level, elections to local government institutions are held every four years on a non-party basis by the Chief Election Commissioner of Pakistan.

Members of the Union Council, including the Union Administrator and Vice Union Administrator, are elected through direct elections based on adult franchise and a joint electorate. However, for the election of reserved seats for women in the Zila Council, proportionately divided among Tehsils or Towns, all members of the Union Councils in a Tehsil or Town shall be elected. It is the responsibility of the Chief Election Commissioner to organize and conduct these elections.

The first local government election was held in 1959 under the dictatorship of Ayub Khan. The second local government election was held in 1979 under the dictatorship of General Zia-ul-Haq. The third local government election was held after the coup tenure of Pervez Musharraf in 2000. Finally, for the first time in the history of Pakistan, local body elections were held on December 7, 2013. Balochistan was the first province where these polls were held. Punjab, Sindh, and Khyber Pakhtunkhwa (KP) were all set to conduct the polls. These elections were held due to the immense pressure from the newly emerging political power of PTI on the central government of PML-N.

=== Zimni elections (by-elections) ===
By-elections (in Urdu call, Zimni elections) are held due to fill the vacant seat due to resignation, disqualification or death of a respective person. Election Commission of Pakistan is hosting zimni elections since It was founded.

==== July 2022 Punjab provincial by-election ====
175 Candidates from across Punjab contested in these by-elections. 3,131 Polling Stations were created in 20 Constituencies out of which 731 were for men, 700 for women, and 1700 were combined polling stations. The ECP has declared 1304 polling stations sensitive and 690 highly sensitive. Polling stations from Lahore (4 Seats) and Multan (1 Seat) have been declared sensitive.

==== Results ====
Party	Votes		Seats			
Party	No.	%	Contested	Lead	Won	+/−
Pakistan Tehreek-e-Insaf	1,1634,526	46.8	20	12,589,300	15	
Pakistan Muslim League (N)	0.9	0.0	0	0	0	
Others & Independents	TBD	12.7	135	0	1	
Invalid/Rejected	TBD	TBD				
Total	1,834,894	100				
Registered voters/Turnout	4,579,898	46.96				
Source:ECP

== Methods of voting qualification ==
=== Qualification for membership of the Parliament ===
A person who is a citizen of Pakistan, is enrolled as a voter in any electoral roll under the Electoral Rolls Act 1974 and in case of National/Provincial Assemblies is not less than 25 years of age and in case of Senate not less than 30 years of age, is of good character and is not commonly known as one who violates Islamic injunctions, has adequate knowledge of Islamic teachings and practices, obligatory duties prescribed by Islam as well as abstains from major sin, is sagacious, righteous and non-profligate, honest and ameen, has not been convicted for a crime involving moral turpitude or for giving false evidence, and has not, after establishment of Pakistan, worked against the integrity of the country or opposed the ideology of Pakistan and is graduate, can contest the elections and become a member of the Parliament or a Provincial Assembly.

=== Voter qualification ===
A person, who is a citizen of Pakistan, is not less than 18 years of age on the first day of January of the year in which the rolls are prepared or revised, is not declared by a competent court to be of unsound mind and is or is deemed to be a resident of an electoral area, can get their selves enrolled as a voter in that electoral area. The citizens registered on the electoral rolls are only eligible to cast their votes.

== Voting registration system ==
- For the conduct of elections to the National and Provincial Assemblies, the Election Commission appoints a District Returning Officer for each District and a Returning Officer for each constituency, who are drawn from amongst the officers of the Judiciary, the Federal/Provincial Government and Local Authorities. Returning Officers are mostly Additional District & Sessions Judges.
- The list of polling stations is prepared by the Returning Officers and approved by the District Returning Officer. No polling station can be located in the premises of a candidate.
- The list of Presiding Officers, Assistant Presiding Officers and polling staff is prepared by the Returning Officer and sent to the District Returning Officer for approval at least 15 days before the polls. The Presiding Officer is responsible for conducting polls at the Polling Station and maintaining law and order. He is assisted by the Assistant Presiding Officers and Polling Officer.
- After the publication of Election Schedule by the Election Commission, nomination papers are invited from interested contesting candidates.
- Scrutiny of nomination papers is carried out by the Returning Officers and nomination papers are accepted/rejected.
- Appeals against rejection/acceptance of nomination papers are filed with the appellate tribunal, who decide such appeals summarily within such time as may be notified by the commission and any order passed thereon shall be final.
- Final list of contesting candidates is prepared and published in the prescribed manner by the Returning Officer after incorporation of the decisions on appeals and after withdrawal of candidature by the candidates if any.
- Election Symbols are also allocated to the candidates by the Returning Officer according to their party affiliation or as an individual candidate, from the list of Election Symbols approved by the Election Commission. The Returning Officer also publishes the names of the contesting candidates arranged in the Urdu alphabetical order specifying against each the symbol allocated to him.
- The Election Commission of Pakistan provides each Returning Officer with copies of voter's list for his constituency who distributes it amongst the Presiding Officers in accordance with the polling scheme and assignment of voters to each polling station/booth.
- Voters cast their votes at specified polling stations according to their names in an electoral rolls. Since the election for both National and Provincial Assemblies constituencies are held on the same day, the voter is issued two separate ballot papers for each National Assembly and Provincial Assembly constituency.
- When an elector presents himself at the polling station to vote, the Presiding Officer shall issue a ballot paper to the elector after satisfying himself about the identity of the elector through his identity card.
- Polling is held for nine hours on the polling day without any break.
- Immediately after the close of the poll votes are counted at the polling stations by the Presiding Officers in presence of the candidates, their Election Agents, and Polling Agents.
- After counting the ballot papers the Presiding Officer prepares a statement of the count indicating the number of votes secured by a candidate, and send it to the Returning Officer along with the election material, un-used ballot papers, spoilt ballot papers, tendered ballot papers, challenged ballot papers, marked copies of the electoral rolls, the counter-foils of used ballot papers, the tendered votes lists, and the challenged votes lists.
- The Presiding Officers also announce the result of count at the polling stations and paste a copy of the result outside the polling stations.
- After the receipt of statement of counts from the Presiding Officers of the polling stations, the Returning Officer compiles the preliminary unofficial result and intimates the results to the Election Commission through fax for announcement on print/electronic media.
- After the announcement of unofficial result, the Returning Officer serves a notice to all the contesting candidates and their election agents regarding the day, time and place fixed for consolidation of the result. In the presence of the contesting candidates and election agents, the Returning Officer consolidates the results of the count furnished by the Presiding Officers in the prescribed manner including postal ballot received by him before the polling day.
- Immediately after preparing the consolidated statement the Returning Officer submits a copy to the Election Commission in the prescribed form which publishes the names of the returned candidates in the official Gazette.

== See also ==
- Democracy in Pakistan
- Military dictatorship in Pakistan
