= 1988 Pakistani presidential election =

- 6 December 1988

439 votes in the Electoral College Plurality of votes needed to win
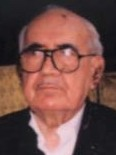

Candidate	Ghulam Ishaq Khan	Nawabzada Nasrullah Khan
Party	Independent (Note: Ran as an independent candidate with support and votes from the Islami Jamhoori Ittehad and the Pakistan People’s Party)	PDP
Alliance	PPP-IJI
Electoral vote	348	91
Percentage	79.27%	20.73%
President before election
Ghulam Ishaq Khan (Caretaker after Zia-ul-Haq’s death)
Elected President
Ghulam Ishaq Khan
Independent

Indirect presidential elections were held in December 1988 to elect the 7th President of Pakistan. The votes were given by the Electoral College of Pakistan, which had its new members in both national and provincial assemblies elected in the corresponding 1988 Pakistani general election.

The elections saw a deal struck between the already ruling Independent caretaker president, Ghulam Ishaq Khan and the Pakistan Peoples Party (PPP) as well as the Islami Jamhoori Ittehad (IJI). With support from the two largest parties, Ishaq Khan won the elections with ease.

== Background, candidates ==
The presidential elections were held after a decade of military rule, where the 6th president, Muhammad Zia-ul-Haq ruled with the Armed Forces as military president and as Chief martial law administrator with authoritarian rule. Zia-ul-Haq would die in a controversial plane crash, which left the presidential office vacant, thus, the powerful Chairman of the Senate, Ghulam Ishaq Khan took over as empowered interim president.

The Revival of the Constitutional Order had amended the Constitution, which allowed the president to appoint any member of the National Assembly as prime minister. Ghulam Ishaq Khan appointed Benazir Bhutto as Prime Minister of Pakistan on the condition that she would give full support to him in the December presidential elections.

A political deal was made between Ghulam Ishaq Khan and Benazir Bhutto. The Pakistan Peoples Party assured that they would vote for Ghulam Ishaq Khan, as Ishaq Khan had appointed Benazir as prime minister. Ghulam Ishaq Khan was also the candidate of Islami Jamhoori Ittehad.

== Results ==
4 candidates took part in the elections, with most of them minor candidates securing low votes from minor and regional parties.

Ghulam Ishaq Khan easily won the elections, due to the support and votes given to him by the 2 largest political groups, the right-wing Islami Jamhoori Ittehad (IJI) and left-wing Pakistan Peoples Party (PPP), this support would allow him to secure the highest number of votes — 608 out of 752.

== Aftermath ==
The election of Ghulam Ishaq Khan as President would extend his already ongoing term. Since he ruled directly after Zia-ul-Haq’s presidency, he would be given high-level presidential powers, as Zia-ul-Haq ruled as an authoritarian president. The powers given to the President of Pakistan in Zia-ul-Haq’s time mainly consisted of the Eighth Amendment, in which the President could dissolve the government whenever he thought need be.

Benazir Bhutto would be ruling Prime Minister at the time of Ghulam Ishaq Khan’s presidency. She would be highly anti-Zia-ul-Haq and attempted to reverse his policies, mainly the Eighth Amendment. As Benazir was the Prime Minister, she wanted more power for the Prime Minister, and less for the President. These desires of Benazir Bhutto would consequently lead to a conflict with Ghulam Ishaq Khan, who would dissolve Benazir’s government, as she attempted to strip the Presidential powers via reversing the Eighth Amendment.

Ghulam Ishaq Khan would rule the country for more than 4 years, following the election, and would come into conflict with both his former allies, the PPP and IJI, as he dissolved both Benazir Bhutto’s and Nawaz Sharif’s governments over the disputed Eighth Amendment.
