= Next Pakistani general election =

- By 28 February 2029

All 336 seats in the National Assembly 169 seats needed for a majority
- Opinion polls
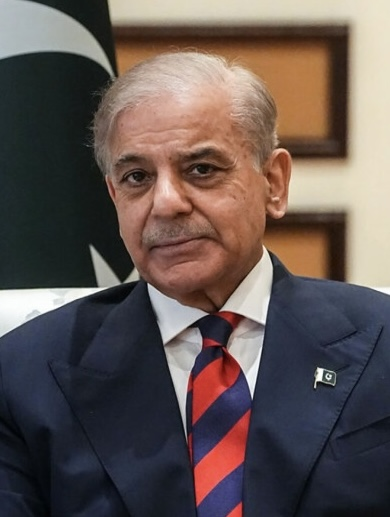

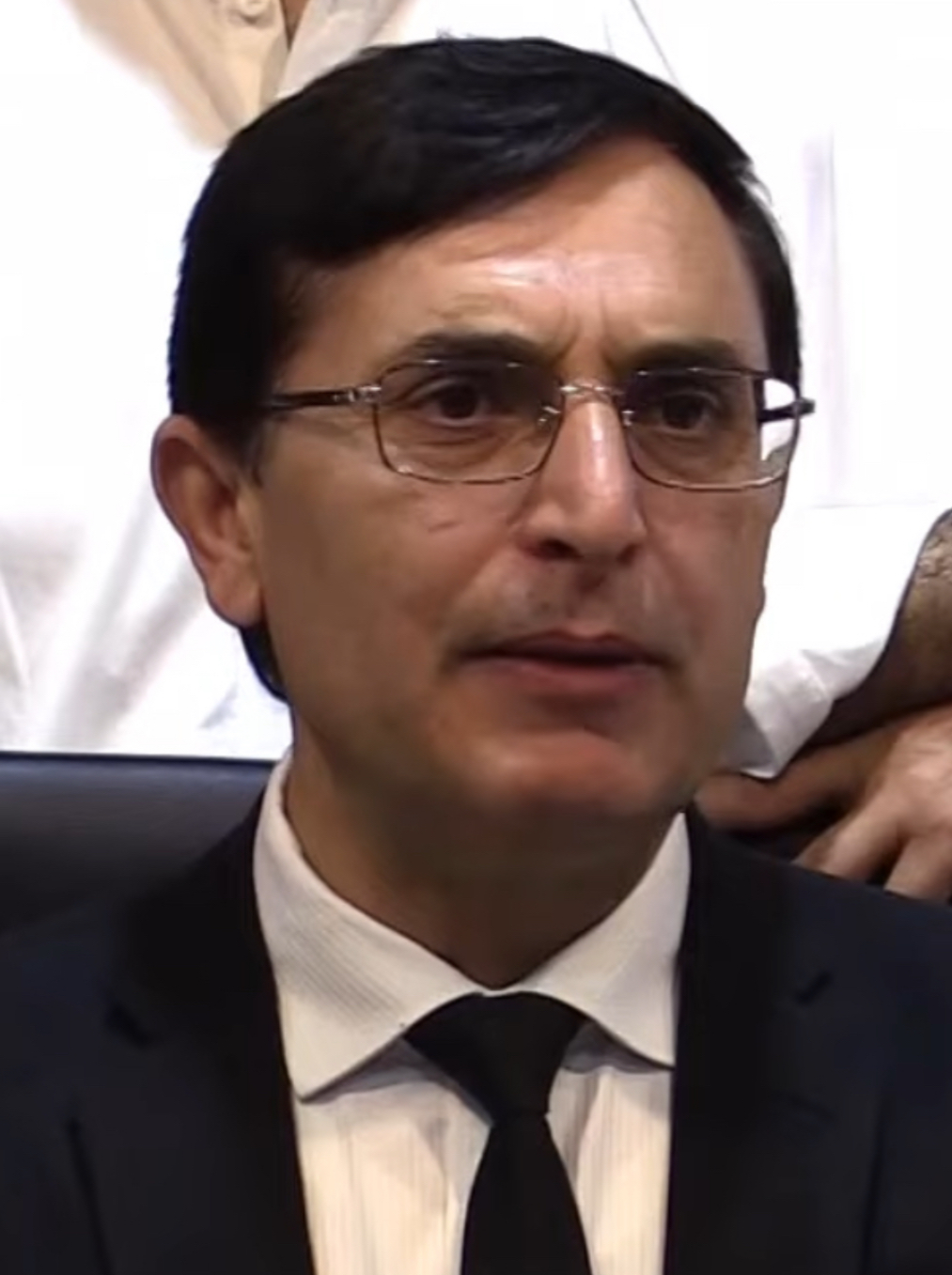

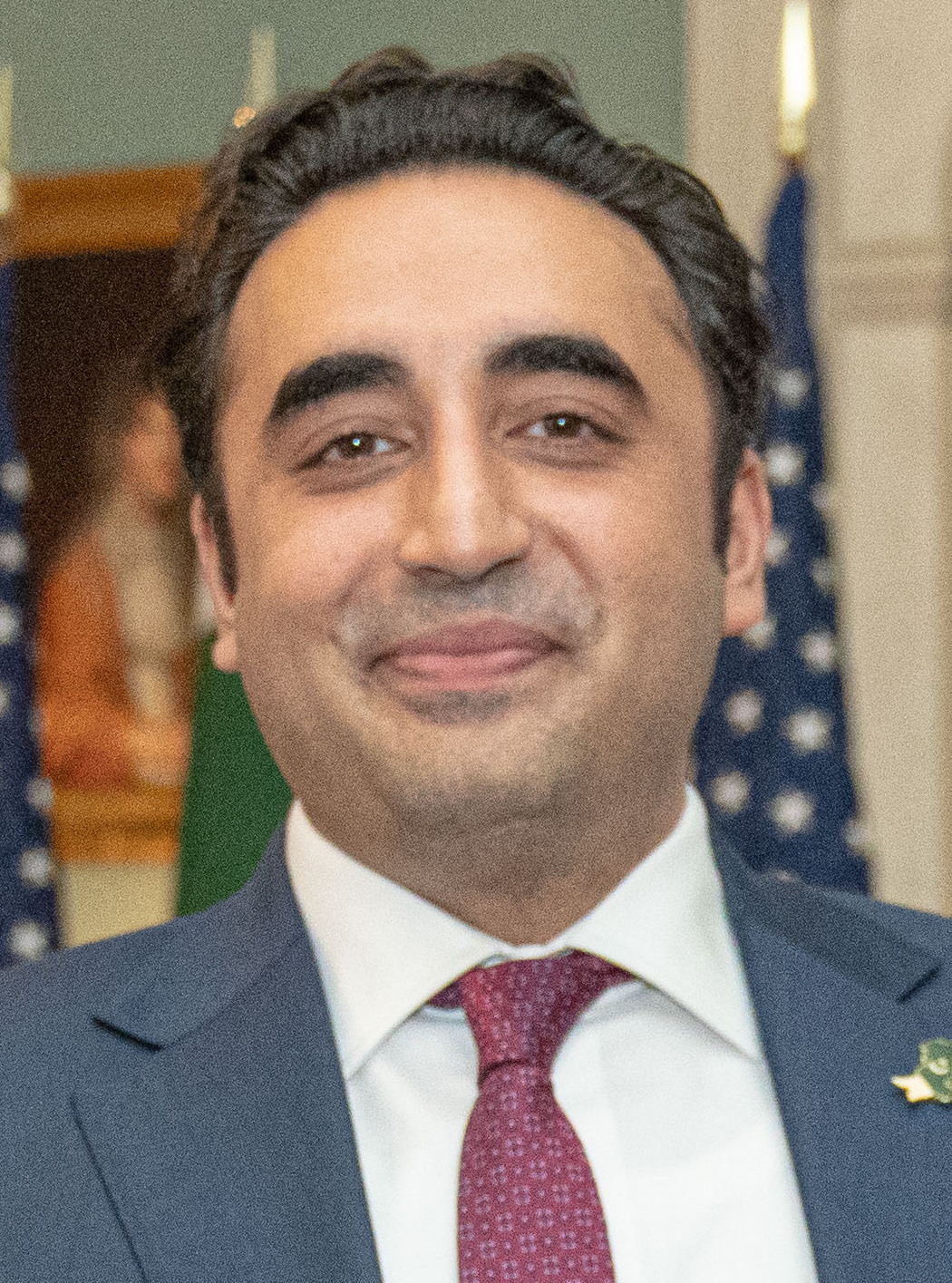
Leader	Shehbaz Sharif	Gohar Ali Khan	Bilawal Bhutto Zardari
Party	PML(N)	PTI	PPP
Last election	108 seats	94 seats	45 seats
Seats needed	▲61	▲75	▲96
- National Assembly constituencies
Incumbent Prime Minister
Shehbaz Sharif
PML(N)

General elections are expected to be held in Pakistan by 28 February 2029. If the National Assembly is upcoming early, elections must be held in Pakistan.

== Background ==
The 2024 Pakistani general election in Pakistan took place on 8 February 2024. During these elections, the Pakistan Muslim League (N) (PML(N)) secured 108 seats, the Sunni Ittehad Council (SIC) secured 81 seats, and the Pakistan People's Party (PPP) secured 68 seats. This equation occurred after independents had joined various political parties and reserved seats had been allocated. On Election Day, independents won a total of 103 seats, with 93 unofficially backed by Pakistan Tehreek-e-Insaf (PTI). However, PTI candidates were unable to contest under the party banner due to the Election Commission of Pakistan's ruling that PTI had failed to conduct intra-party elections in accordance with the party's constitution. Subsequently, 81 members supported by PTI joined SIC after the election.

On 3 March 2024, the election for the position of prime minister occurred. Shehbaz Sharif, representing PML(N), was re-elected as Prime Minister of Pakistan for the second time, securing 201 votes compared to the 92 votes received by Omar Ayub, a PTI candidate. As no single party in the assembly had a clear majority of 169 members, Sharif won with the combined support of PML (N) allies, major of them being the PPP. Khan had backing from SIC members.

On 3 March 2024, Gohar Ali Khan was elected unopposed as the chairman of PTI, and took on the leadership role in accordance with the party's constitution. On 2 April 2024, Omar Ayub Khan was designated as the leader of the opposition in the National Assembly of Pakistan.

By-elections for a combined total of 22 seats across the National Assembly of Pakistan and three provincial assemblies (Punjab, Balochistan, and Khyber Pakhtunkhwa) took place on 21 April 2024. PML(N) secured the most seats with 12 wins, while PPP, SIC, and independent candidates each garnered 2 seats. Additionally, PML(Q), ANP, BNP(M), and IPP each claimed one victory.

After the disqualification of 12 PTI-affiliated members and a resignation of one PPP member, by-elections were held on 23 November 2025 for 13 seats across the National Assembly and the Provincial Assembly of Punjab. PML(N) again secured the most seats, gaining the 12 vacated seats from PTI, while PPP was able to hold its one seat.

On 11 October 2026, a state of emergency was declared in PTI-led Khyber Pakhtunkhwa by the President of Pakistan Asif Ali Zardari under Article 232 of the Constitution of Pakistan. A Governor's rule was also imposed under Article 234 of the Constitution. The Governor of Khyber Pakhtunkhwa Faisal Kundi assumed all the functions of the provincial government and the federal government appointed an 11-member technocratic Advisory Council to assist him in that regard.
