= Sardar Muhammad Iqbal =

Pakistani jurist

Federal Ombudsman of Pakistan
- In office 8 August 1983 – 7 August 1987

Chief Justice of the Lahore High Court
- In office December 1972 – January 1976

Personal details
- Born: 1922
- Died: 4 May 2008 (aged 85–86) Lahore, Punjab, Pakistan
- Profession: Jurist

Sardar Muhammad Iqbal (1922 – 4 May 2008) was a Pakistani jurist who served as chief justice of the Lahore High Court from 1972 to 1976 and later became the first Federal Ombudsman of Pakistan.

== Early life ==
Iqbal was born in 1922 in Poonch. He obtained his LL.B. from the University of the Punjab in 1949 and was enrolled as an advocate of the Lahore High Court in 1950.

He later taught at the Punjab University Law College for about two decades and was associated with the university as a member of its syndicate.

== Career ==
Iqbal was elected a member of the West Pakistan Bar Council in 1958 and again in 1962. In 1962, he was appointed a permanent judge of the West Pakistan High Court. He later served as a member of the Election Commission of Pakistan from 1964 to 1967.

In 1972, he was elevated as chief justice of the Lahore High Court. He retired in January 1976 when a constitutional amendment made the office of chief justice a four-year tenure post.

Iqbal became the first Wafaqi Mohtasib (Federal Ombudsman) of Pakistan, serving from 8 August 1983 until 7 August 1987.
