= 1997 Pakistani presidential election =

- 31 December 1997

457 votes in the Electoral College 229 votes needed to win
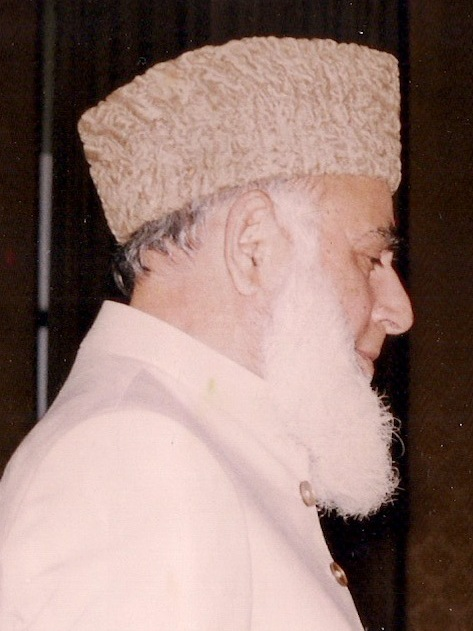

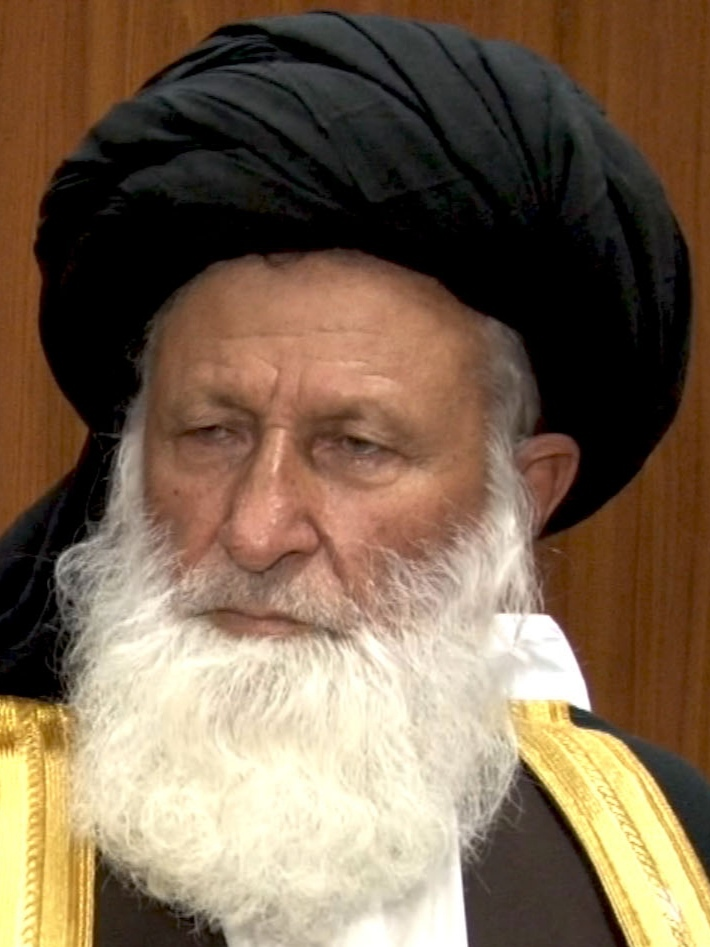
Candidate	Rafiq Tarar	Aftab Shaban Mirani	Muhammad Khan Sherani
Party	PML(N)	PPP	JUI (F)
Home state	Punjab	Sindh	Balochistan
Electoral vote	374	31	22
Percentage	81.84%	6.78%	4.81%
President before election
Wasim Sajjad (Acting)
PML(N)
Elected President
Rafiq Tarar
PML(N)

An indirect presidential election was held on 31 December 1997 in Pakistan. The Electoral College of Pakistan – a joint sitting of the Senate, National Assembly and Provincial Assemblies – elected a new president after the resignation of President Farooq Leghari. As required by the constitution, Wasim Sajjad (in his position as Chairman of the Senate of Pakistan) automatically became acting president on 2 December 1997, upon the resignation of Leghari. Muhammad Rafiq Tarar, a candidate supported by Pakistan Muslim League (N) (PML-N) won the election with 374 votes, defeating Aftab Shaban Mirani and Muhammad Khan Sherani, candidates supported by Pakistan People's Party (PPP) and Jamiat Ulema-e-Islam (F) (JUI-F), respectively.

== Background ==
Farooq Leghari, the previously elected president, served amid a constitutional crisis that had put the government of Prime Minister Nawaz Sharif at odds with the judiciary, led by Chief Justice Syed Sajjad Ali Shah. Leghari had supported the judiciary and as a result, faced the threat of impeachment. Therefore, he resigned on 2 December 1997, soon followed by Shah's dismissal from his office, ending the crisis.

== Candidates ==
The Pakistan Muslim League (N) (PML-N) nominated Muhammad Rafiq Tarar, a former judge who served as the Chief Justice of the Lahore High Court and a Senior Justice of the Supreme Court. After he retired from the judiciary in 1994, he joined politics as a legal advisor to Nawaz Sharif, who was then serving as the Leader of the Opposition. He was elected to the Senate as a candidate of the PML(N) from Punjab in March 1997 and served in that body until his election to the presidency. His candidacy was initially rejected by the Election Commission of Pakistan (ECP), but he was granted a stay through an order by a larger bench of the Lahore High Court.

The Pakistan People's Party (PPP) nominated Aftab Shaban Mirani, the former Minister of Defence and Chief Minister of Sindh. On the other hand, the Jamiat Ulema-e-Islam (F) (JUI-F) nominated Muhammad Khan Sherani, a member of the National Assembly from NA-200 Zhob and former Nazim of Zhob District.

== Results ==
Tarar won the election in a landslide, receiving 374 votes out of the 457 available. On the other hand, Mirani and Sherani, only got 31 and 22 votes, respectively. Tarar's victory was expected due to the PML(N)'s supermajority in the Electoral College, which they gained due to a landslide win in the 1997 general elections.

== Aftermath ==
Tarar was sworn in as Pakistan's ninth president on 1 January 1998 during a "simple ceremony" at the Aiwan-e-Sadr.

Soon after his election, Benazir Bhutto delivered a speech in London to the Commonwealth Ethnic Bar Association, accusing him of dishonesty and criticizing his election. She claimed that he "dishonestly legitimized the overthrow of [her] first government" and referenced former President Leghari's accusation "of "taking briefcases of money" to bribe other judges in the famous 1997 case". She also spoke of how Malik Mohammad Qayyum, a Justice of the Lahore High Court rushed back from his mother's funeral to grant a stay on the ECP's rejection of Tarar's nomination.

== See also ==
- Former President of Pakistan Muhammad Rafiq Tarar
