= Lalak Jan =

Pakistani military person and Nishan-e-Haider recipient (1967–1999)

Havildar Lalak Jan NH
- حولدار لالک جان
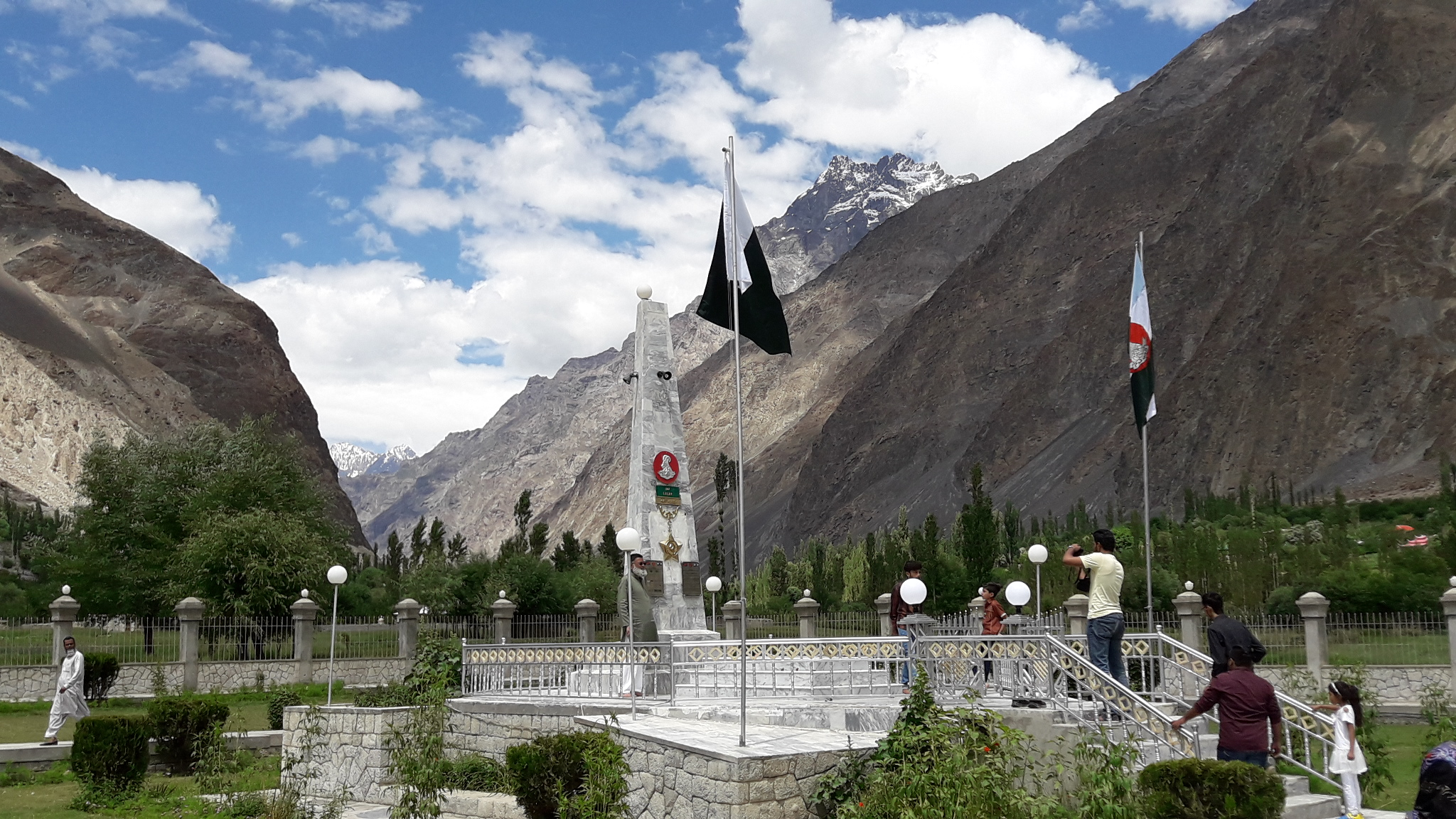
- Tomb of Lalak Jan, Yasin Valley, Gilgit-Baltistan
- Born: 1 April 1967; Yasin Valley, Gilgit–Baltistan, West Pakistan
- Died: 7 July 1999 (aged 32)
- Burial place: Hundur, Yasin Valley, Gilgit-Baltistan
- Military career
- Allegiance: Pakistan
- Branch: Pakistan Army
- Service years: 1984–1999
- Rank: Havildar
- Unit: 12 Northern Light Infantry
- Conflicts: Kargil War † with India in 1999
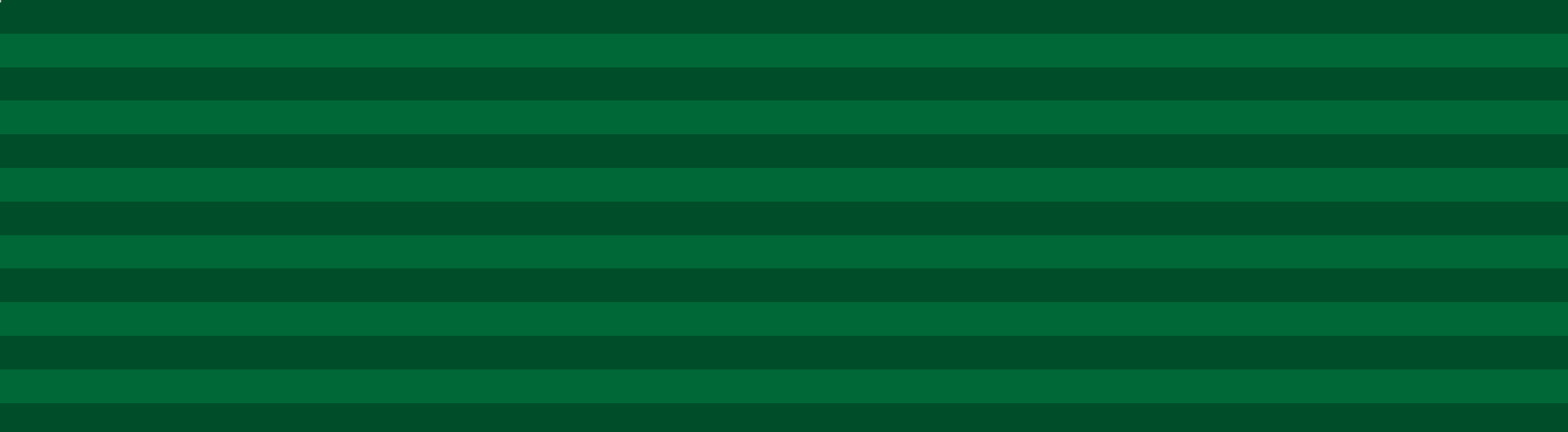
- Awards: Nishan-e-Haider (Mark of the Lion) by the Government of Pakistan in 1999

Havaldar Lalak Jan NH (Urdu: حولدار لالک جان) (1 April 1967 – 7 July 1999) was a Pakistani non-commissioned officer and posthumous recipient of Pakistan's highest military award, Nishan-e-Haider (Mark of the Lion). Belonging to the Northern Light Infantry regiment of the Pakistan Army, he was the 11th and most recent recipient of the Nishan-e-Haider and was awarded for his bravery and gallant actions during the Kargil War of 1999, where he was killed in action.

== Early life ==
Lalak Jan was born on 1 April 1967 in Yasin, in the Gupis-Yasin District of Gilgit-Baltistan. After completing his education, he joined the Pakistan Army on 10 December 1984 and eventually rose to the rank of Havaldar.

== Battle and death ==
Lalak Jan enlisted in the Pakistan Army on 10 December 1984. Lalak Jan was serving in the Northern Light Infantry (NLI) when the Kargil War began in May 1999. He volunteered for deployment on the front lines in May 1999. Later that year, his post came under numerous attacks from the Indian Army, which he successfully repelled. He was killed on 7 July 1999 after succumbing to serious injuries from heavy shelling on his position by Indian forces.

== Burial ==
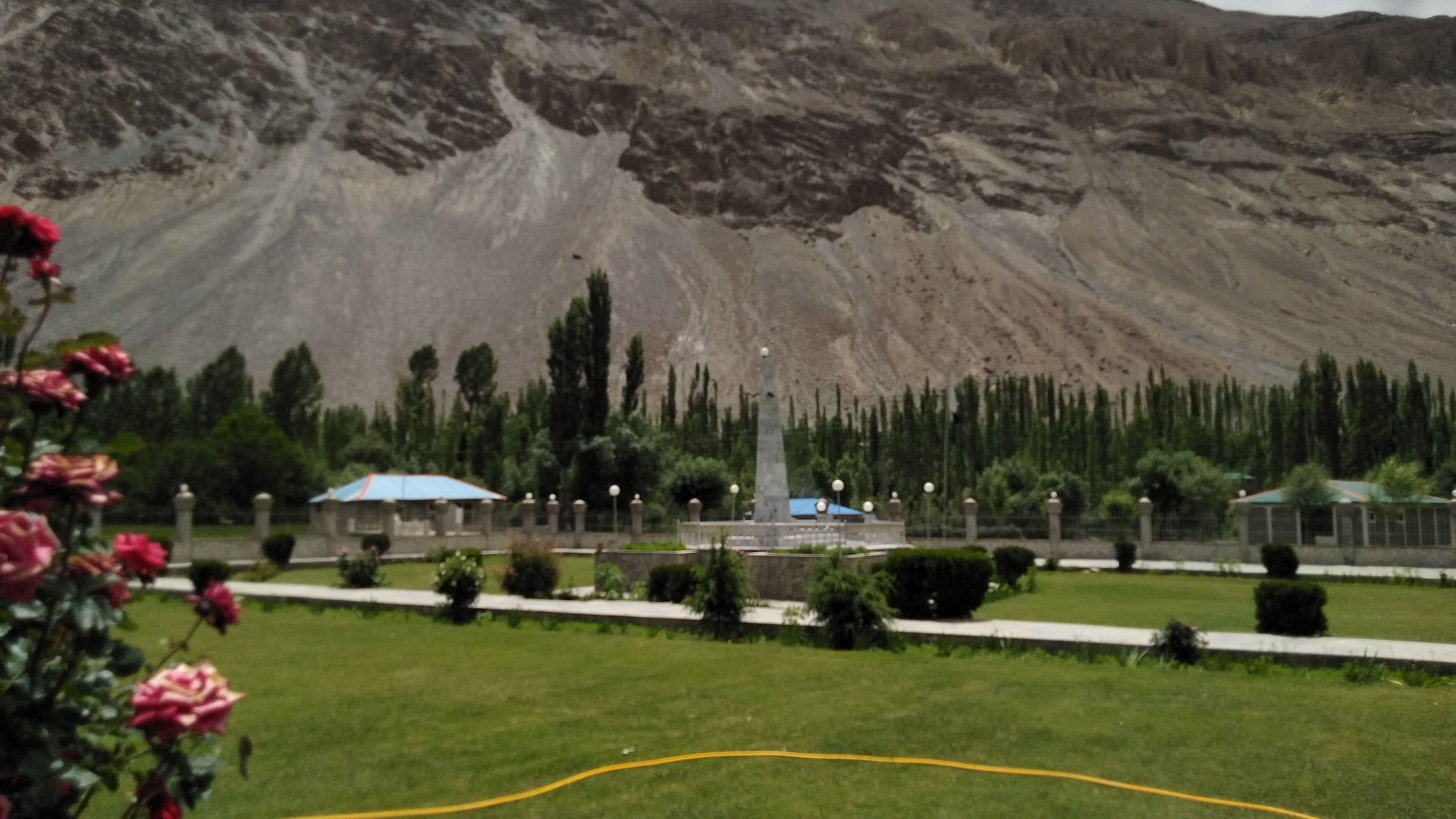
The place where Lalak Jan was buried.

Lalak Jan was buried in his hometown, Hundur, in the Yasin Valley, Gupis-Yasin District, Gilgit-Baltistan. Each year, officials from the Government of Pakistan, Pakistan Armed Forces, and local residents visit his tomb to offer prayers and lay wreaths.

== Awards and decorations ==
The Government of Pakistan awarded him the Nishan-e-Haider (Mark of the Lion), the country's highest honour for extraordinary gallantry in 1999.

Nishan-e-Haider Award Recipient
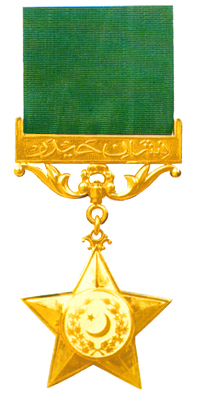
- Lalak Jan was the recipient of the Nishan-e-Haider award
- Date: 1999
- Country: Islamic Republic of Pakistan
- Presented by: Muhammad Rafiq Tarar
