= Federal Ombudsman of Pakistan =

Governmental institution in Pakistan

Wafaqi Mohtasib (Federal Ombudsman)
- وفاقی محتسب

Agency overview
- Formed: 1983
- Jurisdiction: Government of Pakistan
- Headquarters: Constitution Ave, G-5/2 G-5, Islamabad, Pakistan
- Agency executive: Ejaz Ahmad Qureshi, Wafaqi Mohtasib (Ombudsman) of Pakistan
- Parent department: President of Pakistan
- Website: www.mohtasib.gov.pk

Wafaqi Mohtasib, (Urdu: وفاقی محتسب), also known as the Federal Ombudsman, is a governmental institution in Pakistan established by Presidential Order I of 1983, during the tenure of President General Zia ul Haq. The primary mandate of the Wafaqi Mohtasib is to identify, investigate, and address instances of injustice stemming from the maladministration of federal government agencies. Its role is crucial in ensuring accountability and fairness in the public sector, serving as a mechanism for citizens to seek redress for grievances caused by administrative lapses.

== Overview ==
In Pakistan, the concept of establishing an ombudsman institution gained momentum over time, culminating in the inclusion of Article 276 in the Interim Constitution of 1972, which laid the groundwork for the appointment of both Federal and Provincial Ombudsmen. Subsequently, the Constitution of 1973 further solidified the provision for a Federal Ombudsman. The actual establishment of the institution occurred through the enactment of the Establishment of the Office of Wafaqi Mohtasib (Ombudsman) Order, 1983 (President’s Order No. 1 of 1983). This order, now enshrined in the Constitution of Pakistan under Article 270-A, officially brought the institution of the Wafaqi Mohtasib into existence, with operations commencing on 8th August 1983.

Headquartered in Islamabad, the Wafaqi Mohtasib operates with a network of regional offices located in Lahore, Sukkur, Dera Ismail Khan, Faisalabad, Multan, Quetta, Peshawar, Karachi and Hyderabad. This extensive coverage ensures accessibility and facilitates the institution's mandate to address grievances across the country.

In addition to the Wafaqi Mohtasib, Pakistan boasts several other specialized ombudsman agencies at both the federal and provincial levels. These include:

- Banking Mohtasib Pakistan: This institution focuses on addressing grievances related to banking services, ensuring fairness and transparency in the banking sector.
- Federal Insurance Ombudsman: Responsible for handling complaints and disputes concerning insurance services provided by federal entities, this ombudsman agency plays a vital role in safeguarding consumer interests in the insurance industry.
- Federal Tax Ombudsman: Tasked with the oversight of tax-related matters at the federal level, this ombudsman agency ensures accountability and fairness in tax administration, providing a platform for taxpayers to resolve disputes and grievances.
- Federal Ombudsman Secretariat for Protection Against Harassment: Under the Protection against Harassment of Women at Workplace Act 2010 (PAHWA), the Federal Ombudsman Secretariat for Protection Against Harassment (FOSPAH) was established. PAHWA provides for similar offices at the provincial level.

At the provincial level, each province in Pakistan has its own Provincial Ombudsman's office, known as Mohtasib-e-Aala, dedicated to addressing grievances specific to that region. These offices operate in Punjab, Sindh, KPK and Balochistan.

Additionally, the regions of Azad Jammu and Kashmir also host an Ombudsman office, extending the reach of ombudsman services to residents of that area.

The various ombudsman agencies participate in the Forum of Pakistan Ombudsman (FPO), and the federal bodies are affiliated with Asian Ombudsman Association (AOA) and the International Ombudsman Institute (IOI).

== Historic Background ==
The office of Mohtasib was established in many early Muslim states to ensure that no wrongs were done to citizens. Appointed by the president, the Mohtasib holds office for four years; the term cannot be extended or renewed. The Mohtasib's purpose is to institutionalize a system for enforcing administrative accountability, through investigating and rectifying any injustice done to a person through maladministration by a federal agency or a federal government official. The Mohtasib is empowered to award compensation to those who have suffered loss or damage as a result of maladministration. Excluded from jurisdiction, however, are personal grievances or service matters of a public servant as well as matters relating to foreign affairs, national defence, and the armed services. This institution is designed to bridge the gap between administrator and citizen, to improve administrative processes and procedures, and to help curb misuse of discretionary powers.

== See also ==
- Federal Tax Ombudsman (Pakistan)
- Federal Ombudsman Secretariat for Protection Against Harassment
- President of Pakistan
- List of federal agencies of Pakistan
