= President of Pakistan =

Head of state

- صدرِ پاکستان s̤adr-e Pākistān
- Emblem of President of Pakistan

- Presidential Standard of Pakistan

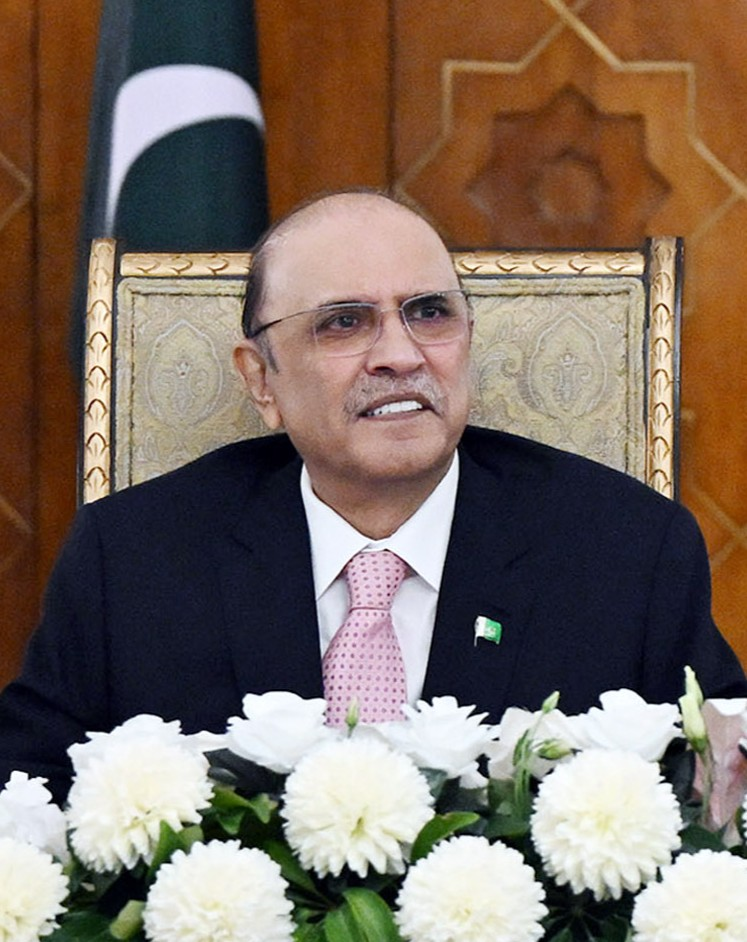
- Incumbent; Asif Ali Zardari since 10 March 2024
- Head of the Pakistani Federation; Executive branch of the Federal Government
- Style: Honourable President (formal); His Excellency (diplomatic); Mr President (informal)
- Type: Head of state Commander-in-chief
- Residence: Aiwan-e-Sadr
- Seat: Islamabad
- Appointer: Electoral College
- Term length: Five years, renewable once consecutively
- Constituting instrument: Constitution of Pakistan (1973)
- Precursor: Monarch of Pakistan
- Inaugural holder: Iskander Mirza
- Formation: 23 March 1956; 70 years ago
- Succession: Line of succession
- Deputy: Chairman of the Senate
- Salary: ₨847,000 per month
- Website: President of Pakistan

The President of Pakistan (Note: Urdu: صدرِ پاکستان, romanised: s̤adr-e Pākistān: also commonly referred to as s̤adr-e mumlikat (صدرِ مملکت) in Urdu, translating to Head of State.) is the head of state of the Islamic Republic of Pakistan. The president is the nominal head of the executive and the federal parliament, the first citizen of the country, and the supreme commander of the Pakistan Armed Forces. Serving as the ceremonial head of the federation, the president is bound to act on advice of the prime minister and the federal cabinet. Asif Ali Zardari is the 14th and current president, having assumed the presidency on 10 March 2024.

The office of president was created upon the proclamation of the Islamic Republic on 23 March 1956. The then serving governor-general, Major General Iskander Mirza, assumed office as the first president. Following the 1958 coup d'etat, the office of prime minister was abolished, leaving the Presidency as the most powerful office in the country. This position was further strengthened when the 1962 Constitution was adopted. It turned Pakistan into a Presidential Republic, giving all executive powers to the president. In 1973, the new Constitution established Parliamentary democracy and reduced the president's role to a ceremonial one. Nevertheless, the military takeover in 1977 reversed the changes. The 8th Amendment turned Pakistan into a semi-presidential republic and in the period between 1985 and 2010, the executive power was shared by the president and prime minister. The 18th Amendment in 2010 restored Parliamentary Democracy in the country, and reduced the presidency to a ceremonial position.

The constitution prohibits the president from directly running the government. Instead, the executive power is exercised on his behalf by the prime minister who keeps him informed on all matters of internal and foreign policy, as well as all legislative proposals. The Constitution however, vests the President with the powers of granting pardons, reprieves, and the control over military; however, all appointments at higher commands of the military must be made by the President on a "required and necessary" basis, upon consultation and approval from the prime minister.

The President is indirectly elected by the Electoral College for a five-year term. The Constitution requires the president to be a "Muslim of not less than forty five (45) years of age". The president resides in an estate in Islamabad known as Aiwan-e-Sadar (President's House). In his absence, the chairman of Senate exercises the responsibilities of the post, until the actual president resumes office, or the next office holder is elected.

There have been a total of 14 presidents. The first president was Iskander Ali Mirza who entered office on 23 March 1956. The current President is Asif Ali Zardari, who took charge on 10 March 2024, following his controversial victory in the 2024 election.

== Powers and authority ==
=== Role of the President ===
The Official Residence and the Workplace of the President is Aiwan-e-Sadr— the presidential palace located in northeastern Islamabad. The presidency forms the vital institutional organ of state and is part of the bicameral Parliament.

Powers to exercise the authority are limited to the ceremonial figurehead, and required to address the Parliament to give a direction for national policies before being informed of its key decisions.

In addition, the president is also the commander-in-chief of the Pakistan Armed Forces, with Chairman of the joint chiefs being its chief military adviser to maintain the civilian control of the Pakistani military. After a thorough confirmation comes from the Prime minister, the President confirms the judicial appointments in the national court system. In addition, the Constitution allows the president to grant pardons, reprieves, and clemency in cases recommended to him by the executive and the judiciary. The president himself has absolute constitutional immunity from criminal and civil proceedings, and no proceedings can be initiated or continued against him during the term of his office.

There shall be a President of Pakistan who shall be the Head of State and shall represent the "unity of the Republic."

— Article 41 in Chapter 1: The President of Part III: The Federation of Pakistan in the Constitution of Pakistan, source

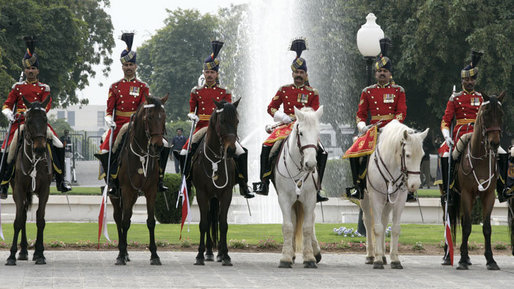
The Ceremonial guard of honour at the Aiwan-e-Sadr.

=== Legislative powers ===
- According to Article 50 of the Constitution the Parliament of Pakistan consists of the president and two Houses known as the National Assembly and the Senate.
- The president shall assent to a bill within ten days after it has been presented to him for assent. if the president fails to do so he shall be deemed to have assented to the bill at the expiration of the period. When the president has assented or is deemed to have assented to a bill, it shall become law and be called Act of Parliament.
- He can prorogue and summon sessions of Parliament both National Assembly and Senate.
- The president may address either House or both Houses of Parliament jointly and may for that purpose oblige the attendance of the Members.
- The president may refer back to Parliament for revision any law or any of its provisions which has come to him for signature after the approval of Parliament.
- The president has the right to speak in parliament.
- The president may send a message to Parliament about a Bill pending in the parliament. The House to which the message is sent shall take into consideration the matter of the message as soon as possible.
- He can dissolve National Assembly on advice of the prime minister. The president may dissolve the National Assembly in his discretion where, a vote of no-confidence having been passed against the prime minister, no other member of the National Assembly commands the confidence of the majority of the members of the National Assembly in accordance with the provisions of the Constitution, as ascertained in a session of the National Assembly summoned for the purpose.
- He can promulgate ordinances when he is satisfied that Parliament is not in session on advice of the Cabinet or the prime minister.
- He can summons a joint sitting of the National Assembly and Senate.
- He also assents the Federal Finance bill passed by Parliament.
- He also assents constitutional amendment bills passed by Parliament.

=== Executive powers ===
- He is the constitutional and ceremonial head of the state. All executive powers are exercised by the federal government consisting of the prime minister and the federal Cabinet on his behalf. He is bound to act on advice of the prime minister or the Cabinet. He can act in his discretion where constitution allows him to do those things in his discretion.
- The duties of the president under their oath is to protect, defend and preserve the constitution and the law.
- The president shall appoint federal ministers and ministers of the state from amongst the members of Parliament on the advice of the prime minister.
- President appoints advisers on the advice of the prime minister.
- He also appoints caretaker prime ministers and caretaker federal Cabinets on advice of caretaker prime ministers.
- President appoints the governors of provinces on advice of the prime minister.
- He appoints the chief election commissioner and members of Election Commission of Pakistan after consultation with the prime minister and the leader of opposition.
- He can remove the prime minister in his discretion when the prime minister fails a confidence vote from the National Assembly.
- The prime minister shall keep the president informed on all matters of internal and foreign policy and on all legislative proposals the federal government intends to bring before Majlis-e-Shoora (Parliament).
- He receives credentials of foreign ambassadors and high commissioners.
- It is also the power of the president to assign rights to ambassadors sent to different countries and to host different heads of state visiting the country.
- He takes the oaths from the prime minister, federal ministers, ministers of state, and advisers and also from the caretaker prime minister and the caretaker Cabinet.
- The functions of the cabinet and the prime minister shall be aid and advice the president.
- The president of Pakistan may cause the issue to be referred to as a referendum in the form of a question that is capable of holding a referendum on advice of prime minister.
- He has authority to promulgate orders on advice of the prime minister or respective ministries and departments.
- He also takes oath from chairmen and heads of different organisations like the chairman of the Federal Public Service Commission and the federal ombudsman.
- When the president dissolves the National Assembly, he is bound to fix a date, not later than 90 days from the date of such dissolution for the holding of the general elections to the Assembly.
- When the National Assembly is dissolved for any reason or completes its constitutional term, the president conducts general elections under his supervision.

=== Judicial powers ===
- He can appoint Chief Justice of Supreme Court on recommendations of an parliamentary committee consisting of members of National Assembly and Senate. Parliamentary Committee send name of selected Chief Justice to Prime Minister and Prime Minister advises President to appoint that Chief Justice to the Supreme Court of Pakistan.
- He appoints Chief Justices of High Courts of Provinces and Islamabad High Court.
- He can also appoint Judges and ad hoc Judges of Supreme Court as well as Judges and Additional Judges of High Courts on recommendations of Judicial Commission of Pakistan.
- He can remove any judge from their position when Supreme Judicial Council recommends President removed that judge after that judge is proven guilty by Supreme Judicial Council.
- The President determines and approves the salaries of Judges of the Supreme Court and High Courts and Federal Constitution Court of Pakistan.
- He also appoint chief justice and justices of Federal Constitutional Court of Pakistan.
- The President of Pakistan may transfer any judge of a High Court from one High Court to another, on recommendation of Judicial Commission of Pakistan and after discussion by the President with the Chief Justice of Pakistan and the chief Justices of both High courts.
- The President of Pakistan shall have the power to Grant Pardon, acquittal and relief and to remit, postpone or convert any punishment passed by any court, tribunal or other Authority.
- He also appoints Chief Justice and Judges of Federal Shariat Court.
- He can also file reference against any judge of Supreme Court and High Court on advice of cabinet or relevant authority.
- This is the power of the president to refer any law made by parliament to the Islamic ideology council for review and recommendation.
- He also takes oath from Chief Justice of Pakistan and Chief Justice of Islamabad High Court and Chief Justice of Federal Constitution Court of Pakistan.

=== Appointing powers ===
- He appoints Attorney General on advice of Prime Minister.
- He appoints Auditor General on advice of Prime Minister.
- He appoints Controller General of Accounts on advice of Prime Minister.
- He appoints Advocate General Islamabad on advice of Prime Minister.
- He also appoints members and chairman of Council of Islamic Ideology, Council of Common Interest, and National Economic Council and National Finance Commission.
- He appoints Governor of State Bank of Pakistan.
- He also appoints Federal Ombudsman, Federal Insurance Ombudsman, Federal Tax Ombudsman, Banking Mohtasib Pakistan and Federal Ombudsperson for Women and Workplace.
- As a chancellor of federal public sector universities, he appoints vice chancellors of that universities.
- He also appoints chairman and members of Federal Public Service Commission

=== Military powers ===
- He is Supreme Commander of Armed forces of the country.
- He appoints Chief of Army Staff concurrently Chief of Defence Forces, Chief of Naval Staff and Chief of Air Staff on advice of Prime Minister.
- The President shall have the power to raise and maintain the Military, naval, and air force of Pakistan and the reserves of such forces.
- The President shall also have the power to determine their salaries and allowances.
- The President shall have the power to grant commission to such forces.
- He can send military troops to other countries and United Nations on advice of Prime Minister.
- He can declare war and peace settlements on advice of Prime Minister.

=== Emergency powers ===
Article 232: Emergency due to war, external or internal disturbance:

- If the president has reached a conclusion that a grave emergency exists in which the security of Pakistan, or any part therefore, is threatened by warfare or external aggression, or by internal trouble and disturbance, beyond the power of a Provincial Government to control, he may issue a proclamation of Emergency.

Article 233: Suspension of Fundamental Rights:

- After the proclamation of Emergency, the president may suspend Articles 15 to 19 and 24 (fundamental rights) through a separate order and this order too is to be laid before the joint sitting of parliament for approval as soon as possible.

Article 234: Emergency due to the breakdown of constitutional machinery:

- Article 234 of the constitution envisages a situation in which constitutional machinery breaks down in a province, as when no political party or coalition has a clear majority in the province to form a government or the law-and-order situation has deteriorated to an extent that provincial Government cannot, in spite of its majority in the Assembly, function in the province.

Article 235: Financial Emergency:

- Article 235 of the constitution of Pakistan. When the economic life, financial stability or credit of the country is threatened, the president, after consultation with the Governor, may issue a proclamation to extend the authority of federation to the giving of direction to any province to observe such principles of financial propriety as is deemed necessary. Even the salaries may be required to be reduced.

President can impose governor rule in any province. He can run provincial government directly.

He can use emergency powers on advice of Prime Minister and cabinet.

From 2000 until 2009, the President was the Chairman of the National Security Council who had authority and control over the nuclear and strategic arsenals; however, the chairmanship and the powers transferred back to the prime minister. Furthermore, the presidential powers have significantly declined with Pakistan's government reversed to a parliamentary democratic republic.

=== Powers before the 18th Amendment ===
Before the 18th Amendment to the constitution in 2010, the President was quite powerful.

He had the constitutional authority to choose and appoint the Prime Minister in his discretion who got majority votes from the National Assembly.

Due to Article 58-2(b), he had the authority to dissolve the National Assembly in his discretion when the Government of the Federation cannot carry out it's duties according to the provisions of the Constitution. President Zia Ul Haq, Ghulam Ishaq Khan and Farooq Leghari used this constitutional provision to dissolve the elected Prime Minister's Government. The President is the ceremonial head of state, while the Prime Minister is head of the executive, although this provision made the President more powerful than the Prime Minister, making the PM subordinate to him. If there is any misunderstanding or disagreement between the President and the Prime Minister, the President may use these powers to dismiss the Prime Minister and dissolve National Assembly. Pakistan's Parliamentary system was changed to a Semi-presidential government as a consequence.

- He had the authority to appoint the Governors of Provinces in his discretion.
- He had the authority to appoint the Chief of Army Staff, Chief of Air Staff, Chief of Naval Staff and Chairman Joint Chiefs of Staff Committee in his discretion.
- He was the chairman of the National Security Council, so he had the authority to take decisions related to national security and defense.
- He was also the Chairman of the National Command Authority. He had the authority to take decisions related to nuclear weapons and missile technologies of the country.
- He had the authority to appoint the Chief Election Commissioner in his discretion; he was not bound to consult with Prime Minister and Leader of Opposition.
- He had the authority to appoint a Caretaker Prime Minister and Caretaker cabinet in his discretion after a dissolution of National Assembly and consultation was not required for these appointments.
- He had the authority to appoint Judges of Supreme Court and High Court with consultation from the Chief Justice of Pakistan. He was not bound to appoint judges from recommendations of the Judicial Commission of Pakistan.
- He had the authority to refer to any matter of public importance to the public in form of referendum in his discretion.
- He had the authority to take decisions related to the foreign policy of the country. President Zia ul Haq and President Musharraf exercised these powers because they were the chiefs of Army Staff and because of the 8th and 17th Amendments to the constitution and President Asif Ali Zardari also exercised these powers because he was chairman of Peoples Party as well as president during 2008 to 2013.

== Eligibility and selection process ==
The Constitution of Pakistan sets the principle qualifications that the candidate must meet to be eligible to the office of the president. A president has to be:

- A citizen of Pakistan
- A Muslim
- At least 45 years of age
- Qualified to be elected as member of the National Assembly

Whenever the Aiwan-e-Sadr becomes vacant, the selection of president is done by the electoral college, which consists of both houses of Parliament (the Senate and National Assembly) and the four provincial assemblies. The chief election commissioner has to conduct elections to the office of the president in a special session. Voting takes place in secrecy.

Each elector casts a different number of votes. The general principle is that the total number of votes cast by members of Parliament equals the total number of votes cast by provincial legislators. Each of the provincial legislatures has an equal number of votes to each other, based on the number of members of the smallest legislature, which is the Balochistan Assembly (65 seats).

The constitution further states that election to the office of president will not be held earlier than sixty days and not later than thirty days before the expiration of the term of the president in office.

== Election and oath ==
The president is elected indirectly for a term of five years. The incumbent president is eligible for re-election to that office, but cannot hold that office for more than two consecutive terms. The president is required to make and subscribe in the presence of the chief justice—, an oath or affirmation that the president shall protect, preserve and defend the Constitution as follows:

I, (The name of the President-elect), do solemnly swear that I am a Muslim and believe in the Unity, and Oneness of Almighty Allah, the Books of Allah, the Holy Qur'an being the last of them, the Prophethood of Muhammad (peace be upon him) as the last of the Prophets and that there can be no Prophet after him, the Day of Judgment, and all the requirements and teachings of the Holy Quran and Sunnah:

That I will bear true faith and allegiance to Pakistan:

That, as President of Pakistan, I will discharge my duties, and perform my functions, honestly, to the best of my ability, faithfully in accordance with the Constitution of the Islamic Republic of Pakistan and the law, and always in the interest of the sovereignty, integrity, solidarity, well- being and prosperity of Pakistan:

That I will not allow my personal interest to influence my official conduct or my official decisions:

That I will preserve, protect and defend the Constitution of the Islamic Republic of Pakistan:

That, in all circumstances, I will do right to all manner of people, according to law, without fear or favour, affection or ill- will:

And that I will not directly or indirectly communicate or reveal to any person any matter which shall be brought under my consideration or shall become known to me as President of Pakistan, except as may be required for the due discharge of my duties as President.

May Allah Almighty help and guide me (Ameen).

== Line of succession and removal ==
The Constitution discusses the possibility of an acting president. Certain office-holders, however, are permitted to stand as presidential candidates in case of vacancy as the constitution does not include a position of vice president:

- The chairman of the Senate of Pakistan
- The speaker of the National Assembly of Pakistan.

The president may be removed before the expiry of the term through impeachment. The president can be removed for violation of the Constitution of Pakistan.

The impeachment process may start in either of the two houses of the Parliament. The house initiates the process by levelling the charges against the president. The charges are contained in a notice that has to be signed by either the chairman or the speaker of the National Assembly through a two-thirds majority. The notice is sent up to the president, and 14 days later it is taken up for consideration.

A resolution to impeach the president has to be passed by the two-thirds majority. The speaker of the National Assembly then summons the joint session not earlier than seven days. The president has the right to defend oneself.

If the resolution is passed by the two-thirds majority at the joint session declaring that the president is unfit to hold the office due to incapacity or is guilty of violating the Constitution or of gross misconduct, then the president shall cease to hold office immediately on the passing of the resolution.

No president has been impeached. However, the proceedings have been used in 2008 in an attempt to impeach former president Pervez Musharraf who tendered the resignation after the proceedings above were used.

== Political background ==
Presidential standard (1956–1967)

=== Early origins ===
From 1947 until 1956, the governor-general of Pakistan acted for the head of state: King George VI (until 1952) and Queen Elizabeth II (from 1952). With the promulgation of the first constitution, Pakistan became an Islamic republic in 1956, and the governor-general was replaced with the presidency. The incumbent governor-general, Iskander Mirza, became Pakistan's first president by 1956 Pakistani presidential election. He reportedly suspended the Constitution of Pakistan of 1956 on 7 October 1958, and appointed Commander-in-Chief of the Pakistan Army General Ayub Khan as the first Chief Martial Law Administrator. Two weeks later, Ayub Khan subsequently carried out the 1958 Pakistani coup d'etat and assumed the presidency.

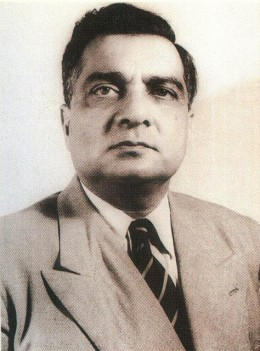
Iskander Mirza became the 1st President of Pakistan in 1956

The Constitution of Pakistan of 1962 introduced by President Ayub Khan, turned the country into a presidential republic without direct elections. Succumbing to internal and international pressure, however, Khan held the 1965 Pakistani presidential election. Khan successfully campaigned against his opponent, Fatima Jinnah, for a second term, but some have alleged that elections were rigged in favour of Ayub Khan.

Presidential standard (1974–1998)

Controversy regarding the U-2 incident (1960), privatisation (1963), and war with India (1965), fuelled a fierce left-wing opposition movement led by Zulfikar Ali Bhutto of the PPP and Bengali nationalist Sheikh Mujibur Rahman who, with the support of demonstrators, aimed to further weaken the presidency. Suffering from paralysis and declining health, Ayub Khan handed over the presidency to army chief General Yahya Khan, who imposed martial law and announced that national elections would be held in 1970. Eventually, general elections were held in 1970 which saw the PPP gaining a majority of seats in West Pakistan (current-day Pakistan) and the Awami League gaining a majority in East Pakistan (current-day Bangladesh).

After he was unable to reach a compromise between the PPP and the Awami League, President Yahya Khan invited Nurul Amin of the Pakistan Muslim League to become the prime minister, and also appointed him as the first vice president. The growing instigated violence against Pakistanis in East Pakistan forced President Yahya Khan to use force in order to maintain order there, which further escalated Bengali resistance (1970). Preemptive strikes against India led to another war in 1971, which freed East Pakistan and created Bangladesh.

Taking personal responsibility for the political isolation and devastation of Pakistan after the fall of East Pakistan, President Yahya Khan stepped down and ceded power to Zulfikar Ali Bhutto. President Bhutto created the current Constitution of Pakistan in 1973, transforming Pakistan into a parliamentary democracy, and reducing presidential powers to that of a ceremonial figurehead.

=== Past Interventions ===
The general elections held in 1977 resulted in an atmosphere of civil unrest instigated by the right-wing alliance, the Pakistan National Alliance. The events leading to it resulted in military intervention by chief of army staff General Zia-ul-Haq and Chairman Joint Chiefs Admiral Mohammad Shariff. Suspending the Constitution in 1977, General Zia-ul-Haq took over the presidency in 1978. Zia's presidency oversaw the modern growth of far-right ideas in the country. Succumbing to domestic pressure to restore the Constitution, President Zia-ul-Haq held a referendum (1984) and called for general elections in 1985. President Zia-ul-Haq appointed Mohammad Junejo as prime minister and assumed more powers through the constitutional amendment. After dismissing Prime Minister Junejo, President Zia-ul-Haq announced that new general elections would be held, but President Zia died in a plane crash in 1988.

The general elections held in 1988 witnessed the victory of PPP in 1988 and appointed Senate chairman Ghulam Ishaq Khan to the presidency. The conflict between Prime Minister Benazir Bhutto and President Ghulam Ishaq Khan arose in two areas regarding the issues of appointments. President Ghulam Ishaq Khan repeatedly intervened in government matters and levelled charges against Prime Minister Benazir Bhutto; thus dismissing Prime Minister Prime Minister Benazir Bhutto in 1990. After holding general elections in 1990, Nawaz Sharif brought up an ideologically conservative government and President Ghulam Ishaq Khan unsuccessfully tried to dismiss Sharif. After a successful intervention by Supreme Court and Chairman of the Joint Chiefs General Shamim Allam, President Ghulam Ishaq Khan and Prime Minister Nawaz Sharif tendered resignations in 1993.

Following the new elections held in 1993, Prime Minister Benazir Bhutto established a strong government after appointing loyalist Farooq Leghari to the presidency. However, the corruption charges and the controversial death of Murtaza Bhutto in 1996 resulted in President Farooq Leghari dismissing Prime Minister Benazir Bhutto. In 1997, President Farooq Leghari could not overcome the heavy mandate bestowed on Prime Minister Nawaz Sharif by the public in 1997. President Leghari unsuccessfully supported Chief Justice Sajjad Ali Shah— both of them resigned, ending the conflict between the Judiciary, the Executive, and the Parliament. After appointing Rafiq Tarar, the Parliament successfully passed constitutional amendment to decisively limit the presidency. After staging a controversial self coup in 1999, General Pervez Musharraf dismissed Prime Minister Nawaz Sharif and President Rafiq Tarar in 2001 while assuming more powers to the presidency. In January 2004, the Electoral College elected Musharraf, and as a result he was, according to the Constitution, "deemed to be elected".

President Musharraf's repeated unconstitutional intervention resulted in a standoff with the Judiciary, and declared a state of emergency in 2007, after dismissing the senior justices of the Supreme Court. Although Musharraf was elected in 2007, the constitutional legality of Musharraf's rule was found dubious. A populist constitutional movement eventually resulted in Musharraf's departure. On 22 August 2008, the electoral commission called for presidential nominations to be delivered by 26 August 2008 and for elections to be held on 6 September 2008.

=== Figurehead overview ===
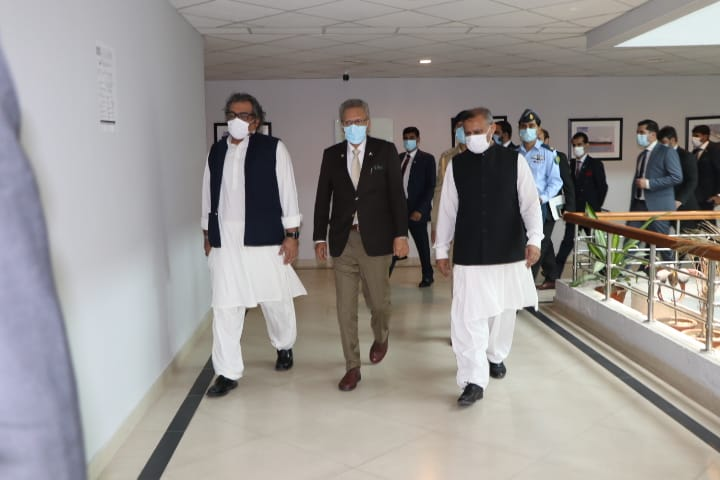
President Arif Alvi visits Maritime Ministry, flanked by Ali Zaidi and Rizwan Ahmed

After the presidential election held in 2008, Asif Ali Zardari lobbied for constitutional amendment to restore the Constitution as it was in 1973. In 2010, the Parliament unanimously and with a large majority, passed the eighteenth amendment of the constitution. It revoked the presidential powers and changed Pakistan from a semi-presidential system of government to a parliamentary republic, with great hopes of governmental stability in the future.

== See also ==
- Principal Secretary to the President of Pakistan
- Air transports of heads of state and government
- Official state car
- Prime Minister of Pakistan
- Chief Justice of Pakistan
- Chief Justice of the Federal Shariat Court
- Chief Minister of Sindh
- Chief Minister of Punjab (Pakistan)
- Chief Minister of Balochistan
- Chief Minister of Khyber Pakhtunkhwa
- Chief Minister of Gilgit-Baltistan
- Prime Minister of Azad Kashmir
- Governor of Sindh
- Governor of Punjab (Pakistan)
- Governor of Balochistan
- Governor of Khyber Pakhtunkhwa
- Governor of Gilgit Baltistan
- President of Azad Kashmir
- Chief of Army Staff of the Pakistan Army
- Constitution of Pakistan
- Wafaqi Mohtasib (Federal Ombudsman)
- Foreign Minister of Pakistan
- Finance Minister of Pakistan
- Interior Minister of Pakistan
- Minister of Defence (Pakistan)
- Vice President of Pakistan
