= Government Islamia College, Gujranwala =

College in Gujranwala, Punjab, Pakistan

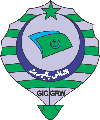

Information
- Type: Public college
- Established: 1912 – Khalsa High School Gujranwala; 1918 – Guru Nanak Khalsa College Gujranwala; 1947 – Islamia College, Gujranwala; 1972 – Government Islamia College, Gujranwala
- Founder: Sir Louis Dane; Sant Attar Singh
- Head teacher: Prof. Pervaiz Akhtar
- Enrolment: 4,000 (2017)
- Colours: Green, Blue
- Affiliations: University of the Punjab
- Website: gicg.edu.pk

Government Islamia College, Gujranwala, officially Government Postgraduate Islamia College Gujranwala, founded as Guru Nanak Khalsa College, is an educational institution in the city of Gujranwala in the Punjab province of Pakistan. It is a well-known institute located in the heart of Gujranwala.

== History ==
Islamia College Gujranwala was established in 1912 as Khalsa High School Gujranwala with the donation of Khalsa Committee, a Sikh educational trust. Sir Louis Dane, the 13th governor of Punjab, laid its foundation. Just six years later on 30 March 1918, it was upgraded to the status of a college and named Guru Nanak Khalsa College Gujranwala. It is one of the oldest colleges of the Punjab.

After the partition of India, Anjuman-i-Islamia Gujranwala took possession of this college and after migration Khalsa Education Council established a new college with same name called Gujranwala Guru Nanak Khalsa College. On 25 November 1947, the institution was renamed Islamia College Gujranwala.

In September 1972, the college was nationalized and in 1990 it was upgraded to post-graduate level.

== Affiliation with Punjab University ==
Islamia College Gujranwala is affiliated with the University of the Punjab, Lahore, Pakistan.

== Notable alumni ==
- Muhammad Rafiq Tarar, former President of Pakistan
- Altaf Gauhar, civil servant and administrator
- Wajahat Masood, journalist, political analyst

Waheed uz Zaman Tariq, a writer

== See also ==
- Government College Gujranwala
