= October 2018 Pakistani by-elections =

By-elections were held in Pakistan on 14 October 2018 and 21 October 2018. These elections were held on twelve constituencies for the National Assembly of Pakistan and twenty-seven constituencies belonging to four provincial assemblies of Pakistan namely Provincial Assembly of Punjab, Provincial Assembly of Sindh, Provincial Assembly of Khyber Pakhtunkhwa, and Provincial Assembly of Balochistan.

== See also ==
- 2013 Pakistani by-elections
