= Federal Tax Ombudsman (Pakistan) =

Pakistani government agency

- وفاقی ٹیکس محتسب پاکستان
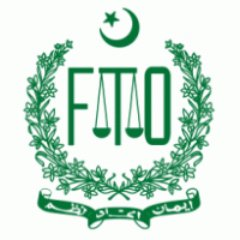

Department overview
- Formed: 2000
- Type: Tax Ombudsman
- Headquarters: Federal Tax Ombudsman Secretariat 5A, Constitution Avenue, Islamabad, Capital Territory, Pakistan. 44000
- Department executives: Mr. Muhammad Zafar Hijazi, Federal Tax Ombudsman of Pakistan; Mr. Jameel Ahmad, Secretary (Acting); Mr. Almas Ali Jovindah, Advisor Legal, FTO Secretariat; Mr. Shoukat Mehmood, Advisor Sales Tax, FTO Secretariat; Mr. Naseer Butt, Advisor Income Tax, FTO Secretariat; Mr. Tanveer Akhtar, Advisor (Appraisment) and Income Tax, FTO Secretariat; Dr. M. Qamar Ud Din Zia Ghaznavi, Advisor Media, FTO Secretariat; Mr. Khaldun ul Haq, Director General
- Website: www.fto.gov.pk

The Federal Tax Ombudsman (FTO, Urdu: وفاقی ٹیکس محتسب پاکستان) is an institution in Pakistan that evaluates complaints against federal tax agencies. Article 37 of the Constitution of Pakistan calls for the State to promote inexpensive and expeditious justice. The Federal Tax Ombudsman Ordinance of 2000 and the Federal Ombudsman Institutional Reforms (FOIR) Act of 2013 confer powers, including administrative and financial autonomy. This aligns with the separation of Pakistan's judiciary and executive branches in accordance with the Constitution.

== History ==
The institution of Ombudsman was first envisaged for Pakistan under Article 276 of the Interim Constitution of 1972, and later carried into the Constitution of 1973, which provided for a Federal Ombudsman. This provision took institutional form through the Establishment of the Office of Wafaqi Mohtasib (Ombudsman) Order, 1983 — the first Presidential Order issued that year — and the Wafaqi Mohtasib began functioning on 8 August 1983.

A dedicated tax-focused ombudsman was created seventeen years later. The Establishment of the Office of Federal Tax Ombudsman Ordinance, 2000 set up the FTO as a distinct institution mandated to diagnose, investigate, and rectify injustice arising from maladministration by officials administering federal tax laws. Justice (Retd.) Saleem Akhtar served as the first Federal Tax Ombudsman, with his term concluding on 18 September 2004.

Over the following two decades, the FTO's statutory footing was broadened by the Federal Ombudsmen Institutional Reforms Act, 2013, which strengthened the office's administrative and financial autonomy and gave it explicit review and stay powers. The institution's regional footprint also expanded considerably in this period, from an initial handful of cities to more than a dozen regional offices as of the mid-2020s.

In December 2025, President Asif Ali Zardari appointed Muhammad Zafar-ul-Haq Hijazi, a former Chairman of the Securities and Exchange Commission of Pakistan, as Federal Tax Ombudsman for a four-year term, succeeding Dr. Asif Mahmood Jah. In July 2026, a lawyers' advocacy group, the Judicial Activism Panel, publicly questioned the transparency of the process behind that appointment, citing precedent on merit-based public appointments; the matter has not been adjudicated by any court.

== Institution of Ombudsman in Pakistan ==
In Pakistan, the establishment of an Ombudsman institution was advocated in Article 276 of the Interim Constitution of 1972, which provided for the appointment of a Federal Ombudsman and Provincial Ombudsmen. The Constitution of 1973 provided for the establishment of Federal Ombudsman, and the institution was eventually created through the Establishment of the Office of Wafaqi Mohtasib (Ombudsman) Order of 1983, which was the President's first order of 1983.

On 8 August 1983, the Ombudsman began functioning. Other Ombudsman institutions in Pakistan include Provincial Ombudsman offices in Khyber Pakhtunkhwa, Punjab, Baluchistan, Sindh, and Azad Jammu and Kashmir; Federal Banking Ombudsman; Federal Insurance Ombudsman; Federal Tax Ombudsman; Federal Ombudsman for Protection of Women against Harassment at Workplace; and Provincial Ombudsman for Protection of Women against Harassment at Workplace in Punjab and Sindh. All Ombudsmen institutions informally collaborate through the Forum of Pakistan Ombudsmen (FPO). They are also affiliated with the Asian Ombudsman Association (AOA), the International Ombudsman Institute (IOI), and the OIC Ombudsman Association.

== International affiliations ==
The Federal Tax Ombudsman represents Pakistan at several national and international ombudsman forums. Domestically, the FTO is a member of the Forum of Pakistan Ombudsman (FPO), an informal coordinating body of Pakistan's federal and provincial ombudsman institutions. Regionally, it is a member of the Asian Ombudsman Association (AOA), and internationally it belongs to the International Ombudsman Institute (IOI).

Pakistan played a founding role in establishing the OIC Ombudsman Association (OICOA), first proposing the networking of ombudsman institutions across OIC member states at the 39th session of the OIC Council of Foreign Ministers in 2012; the association was formally founded in Islamabad in 2014, and moved from a formative to fully operational stage after its by-laws were approved in Turkey in November 2019. Under OICOA's by-laws, the Federal Tax Ombudsman of Pakistan holds the Secretariat of the association on a permanent basis, with the incumbent FTO serving concurrently as OICOA's Secretary General.

== Legal framework ==
The FTO operates under three principal legal instruments. The Establishment of the Office of Federal Tax Ombudsman Ordinance, 2000 created the office and defines "maladministration" for the purposes of a complaint. The Federal Tax Ombudsman Investigation and Disposal of Complaints Regulations, 2001 set out the procedure by which complaints are registered, investigated, and decided. The Federal Ombudsmen Institutional Reforms Act, 2013 extended to all federal ombudsman institutions, including the FTO, a common framework of powers, among them the authority to stay an impugned order for up to sixty days and to hear review petitions.

In exercising these powers, the FTO is vested with the same authority as a civil court under the Code of Civil Procedure, 1908, including the power to summon and examine witnesses on oath, compel production of documents, and receive evidence on affidavit.

== Mandate and jurisdiction ==
The FTO entertains complaints against functionaries of the Federal Board of Revenue and the Revenue Division administering income tax, sales tax, customs duties, and federal excise duty. Under Section 2(3) of the FTO Ordinance, 2000, any aggrieved person, whether an existing or prospective taxpayer, may lodge a complaint over an action or inaction of a Revenue Division functionary that amounts to injustice or maladministration. Beyond individual complaints, the office also acts on references from the President of Pakistan, references from the Supreme Court or High Courts, and on its own motion.

Certain categories of complaint fall outside the FTO's jurisdiction: matters that are sub judice before a court, tribunal, or authority; matters of tax assessment, liability determination, or valuation where an appeal remedy already exists (unless maladministration is clearly intermingled); service matters raised by tax department employees; anonymous or pseudonymous complaints; and complaints filed more than six months after the complainant first had notice of the matter, though the Ombudsman may condone a time-barred complaint in the interest of justice.

== Organizational structure ==
The FTO Secretariat is headed by the Federal Tax Ombudsman, appointed by the President of Pakistan for a non-renewable four-year term under Section 3 of the FTO Ordinance, 2000. The Ombudsman is supported by a Secretary, who heads the day-to-day administration of the Secretariat, and by a team of Advisors drawn from the civil service and the legal profession, each typically assigned to a functional area such as Legal, Sales Tax, Customs, or Advisory Committee and Research matters.

Mr. Jameel Ahmed, Secretary (Acting), Mr. Khalid Javed, Advsior/Registrar, Mr. Muhammad Tanvir Akhtar, Advsior Appraisement, Mr. Almas Ali Jovindah, Advisor Legal, Mr. Muhammad Saleem, Advisor Customs and FE, Mr. Muhammad Naseer Butt, Advsior Income Tax, Mr. Shoukat Mehmood, Advsior Sales Tax and Dr. Muhammad Qamar ud Din Zia Ghaaznavi, Advisor Media.

The Secretariat is organized into functional wings that handle legal affairs, investigation of complaints, research and outreach, and administration, in addition to a Registry that processes incoming complaints.

== Complaint procedure ==
A complaint may be filed online, by e-mail, by post, by courier, or in person, using the FTO's prescribed "Form A," available from the Secretariat and its regional offices. An affidavit must accompany the complaint; blank affidavits are available free of charge at FTO offices.

Under Section 10(3) of the Ordinance, a complaint must be filed within six months of the complainant first becoming aware of the matter complained of. Once a complaint is registered, the concerned agency is required under Section 9(1) of the Federal Ombudsmen Institutional Reforms Act, 2013 to submit written comments within fifteen days, extendable by seven days for sufficient cause. The Ombudsman is then required, under Section 11(1) of the Ordinance and Section 9(5) of the 2013 Act, to decide the complaint within sixty days of its receipt.

An aggrieved party may seek review of a decision within thirty days, which the Ombudsman must decide within forty-five days under Section 13(2) of the 2013 Act. A further representation may be filed with the President of Pakistan within thirty days of the Ombudsman's decision; the operation of the impugned order remains suspended for sixty days pending that representation, which the President is required to decide within ninety days under Section 14 of the 2013 Act.

== List of Federal Tax Ombudsmen ==
#	Name	Term of office	Background / notes
1	Justice (Retd.) Saleem Akhtar	c. 2000 – 18 September 2004	First FTO following the office's establishment in 2000
2	Justice (Retd.) Munir A. Shaikh	December 2004 – c. 2008/2009	Former Supreme Court judge; sworn in at Aiwan-e-Sadr
3	Dr. Muhammad Shoaib Suddle	June 2009 – 2 June 2013	Former police officer (PSP)
4	Abdul Rauf Chaudhry	6 July 2013 – 8 September 2017	Career civil servant (PAS), District Management Group
5	Mushtaq Ahmad Sukhera	8 September 2017 – September 2021	Former IGP Punjab (PSP); briefly removed by the Law Ministry in June 2019 over the Model Town case reference, reinstated by the Islamabad High Court in September 2019
6	Dr. Asif Mahmood Jah	21 September 2021 – December 2025	Former Pakistan Customs Service (BS-21) officer; took premature retirement to accept the post
7	Muhammad Zafar Hijazi	December 2025 – present	Former SECP Chairman (2014–2017); concurrently Secretary General, OICOA and President, Forum of Pakistan Ombudsman

== Scope of FTO ==
The FTO manages complaints by aggrieved existing or prospective taxpayers, references by the Hon’ble President of Pakistan, references by the Supreme Court of Pakistan or High Courts, and Own Motion Notices.

== Role of FTO ==
The FTO's roles include an accountability mechanism for maladministration, a support mechanism for Federal Board of Revenue (FBR) and revenue division, and the promotion of good governance.

== Jurisdiction of FTO ==
FTO entertains complaints against the functionaries of FBR administering laws relating to: income tax, sales tax, customs duties, and federal excise duties.

== Access ==
As defined in Section 2(3) of the FTO Ordinance of 2000, any person can file a complaint with the FTO if he or she feels aggrieved by any action or inaction of any functionary of the Revenue Division or FBR or its field formations which involve injustice and maladministration.

Complaints that cannot be lodged include those that are subjudice before a court or tribunal or authority on the date of receipt of the complaint; relate to assessment of income, determination of liability of tax or duty, classification or valuation of goods, interpretation of law in respect of which legal remedies of appeal are available (unless clearly intermingled with maladministration); are submitted by tax employees concerning service matters; are anonymous or pseudonymous complaints; or are time-barred complaints older than six months. (However, a time-barred complaint can be condoned by the Hon’ble FTO, if he deems it proper in the interest of justice.)

A complaint may be filed online, by email, by post, through a courier service, or in-person. A complaint may be filed on FTO's "Form A", which are available on FTO's website. An affidavit is required with the complaint and are available for free at FTO offices.

== Timeliness ==
According to Section 10(3) of the Ordinance, a complaint is to be made no later than six months from the day on which the person aggrieved first had the notice of the matter. According to Section 9(1) of FOIRA of 2013, the agency is to submit written comments within 15 days, which is further extendable for seven days on a sufficient cause.

According to Section 11(1) of the Ordinance and Section 9(5) of FOIRA of 2013, The FTO is to make a decision within a period of 60 days of the receipt of the complaint. The Revenue Division is to inform the action taken within the specified time. The FTO has power to review, within 30 days, the findings or orders on a review petition made by an aggrieved party. According to Section 13(2) of FOIRA of 2013, the FTO shall decide the review petition within 45 days. According to Section 14(1) of FOIRA of 2013, representation may be filed to the President within thirty days of the decision of the FTO. According to Section 14(2) of FOIRA of 2013, the operation of the impugned order shall remain suspended for 60 days in case of filing of representation before the President of Pakistan. According to Section 14(5) of FOIRA of 2013, the Representation shall be decided within 90 days.

== Special investigations ==
The FTO's special investigations include the Smuggled Vehicles Amnesty Scheme, the ISAF Container Scam, and the One Man Inquiry Commission Third Interim Report.

== Special initiatives ==
Alongside its complaint-resolution mandate, the FTO Secretariat has run a number of youth-facing outreach programmes. In 2025 it launched its first Campus Ambassador Programme, selecting 39 students from 32 universities out of nearly 2,000 applicants for a six-month engagement aimed at building awareness of taxpayer rights and the Ombudsman institution among their peers. The programme, run jointly with the Forum of Pakistan Ombudsman, was renewed for a second cohort in 2026.

The Secretariat has also established a Youth Engagement and Diplomatic Grievance Redressal Cell, and runs an annual internship programme; over 150 students took part in complaint handling, research, and outreach work through the 2025 cohort.

== Regional FTO Offices ==
The FTO has regional offices in Lahore, Karachi, Quetta, Peshawar, Sargodha, Faisalabad, Multan, Sialkot and Hyderabad.

== See also ==
- Federal Ombudsman of Pakistan
- Ombudsmen in Pakistan
- Federal Board of Revenue
- Taxation in Pakistan
