= 2026 Khyber Pakhtunkhwa state of emergency =

On 11 October 2026, a state of emergency was declared in Khyber Pakhtunkhwa province of Pakistan by President Asif Ali Zardari under Article 232 of the Constitution of Pakistan. A Governor's rule was also imposed under Article 234 of the Constitution.

On the same day, the federal government, through a Statutory Regulatory Order (SRO) issued by the Ministry of Interior under Article 245 of the Constitution, authorised the deployment of Pakistan Army troops and assets in aid of civil power in Khyber Pakhtunkhwa.

The Chief Minister of Khyber Pakhtunkhwa, Sohail Afridi, was taken into preventative detention.

On 14 October 2026, the Minister for Parliamentary Affairs Tariq Fazal Chaudhry tabled the motions regarding the proclamation of emergency before the National Assembly and the Senate. Subsequently, both the houses passed a resolution endorsing the federal government’s imposition of emergency in Khyber Pakhtunkhwa.

On 15 October 2026, a joint sitting of Parliament passed resolutions providing its approval to the government’s imposition of emergency and governor’s rule in Khyber Pakhtunkhwa.

On 4 November 2026, the federal cabinet approved the transfer of powers delegated to the Chief Minister of Khyber Pakhtunkhwa to the Governor of Khyber Pakhtunkhwa.

== Background ==
On 29 September 2026, The Express Tribune reported the Law Minister Azam Nazeer Tarar stating a day earlier that "If such circumstances arise, or if they already exist, in which the Constitution allows governor's rule or an emergency to be imposed, then it can be done".

== Proclamation ==
According to the Gazette of Pakistan notification, the Government of Pakistan may direct the Governor of Khyber Pakhtunkhwa to assume, on behalf of the federal government, all or any of the functions of the Government of Khyber Pakhtunkhwa and the powers vested in or exercisable by any body or authority in the Khyber Pakhtunkhwa province, other than the Provincial Assembly of Khyber Pakhtunkhwa.

The proclamation further provides that the powers of the provincial assembly of Khyber Pakhtunkhwa shall be exercisable by, or under the authority of, the Parliament of Pakistan.

Moreover, the Chief Minister of Khyber Pakhtunkhwa, Sohail Afridi, along with the provincial ministers, advisers, special assistants and advocate general, shall immediately cease to hold office.

The notification states that the proclamation shall come into force immediately.

== Khyber Pakhtunkhwa Advisory Council ==
On 11 October 2026, an 11-member technocratic Khyber Pakhtunkhwa Advisory Council was formed by the federal government to assist the governor in exercising the functions of the provincial government on its behalf, as part of the emergency measures under Article 232 of the Constitution.

Khyber Pakhtunkhwa Advisory Council
Post	Member
Advisor for Home and Tribal Affairs	Kifayatullah Khan
Advisor for Finance, Revenue, Excise and Taxation	Tariq Mahmood Pasha
Advisor for Information and Broadcasting	Samar Haroon Bilour
Advisor for Law and Parliamentary Affairs	Amir Javed
Advisor for Health	Nigar Johar
Advisor for Education	Dr Syed Amir Abdullah
Advisor for Auqaf and Religious Affairs	Maulana Tayyab Qureshi
Advisor for Energy and Power, Planning and Development	Osman Saifullah Khan
Advisor for Communication and Works, Local Government, Housing and Transport	Asif Rafiq Afridi
Advisor for Industries and Commerce	Dr Muhammad Irshad
Advisor for Mines and Minerals	Dr Sarfaraz Ali Shah

== Reactions ==
The Human Rights Commission of Pakistan cautioned the federal government and Parliament in a statement that "declaring an emergency or imposing governor’s rule in Khyber Pakhtunkhwa risks further deepening political tensions and undermining democratic processes". It further added that "We strongly urge the federal government and the PTI to resume a meaningful political dialogue immediately and ensure that citizens' fundamental rights are not suspended under any pretext".

The Tehreek-i-Tahafuz Ayin-i-Pakistan (TTAP) condemned the imposition of an emergency and governor’s rule in Khyber Pakhtunkhwa.

During a press conference, the Leader of the Opposition in the National Assembly, Mahmood Khan Achakzai, and the Leader of the Opposition in the Senate, Raja Nasir Abbas Jafri, criticized the federal government for imposing an emergency in Khyber Pakhtunkhwa.

On 14 October 2026, Pakistan Tehreek-e-Insaf Chairman Barrister Gohar Ali Khan filed a petition in the Peshawar High Court challenging the proclamation of emergency.

== See also ==
- 2007 Pakistani state of emergency
