= 2004 Pakistani confidence vote =

2004 Pakistani presidential election
- January 1, 2004

702 votes in the Electoral College 352 electoral votes needed to win
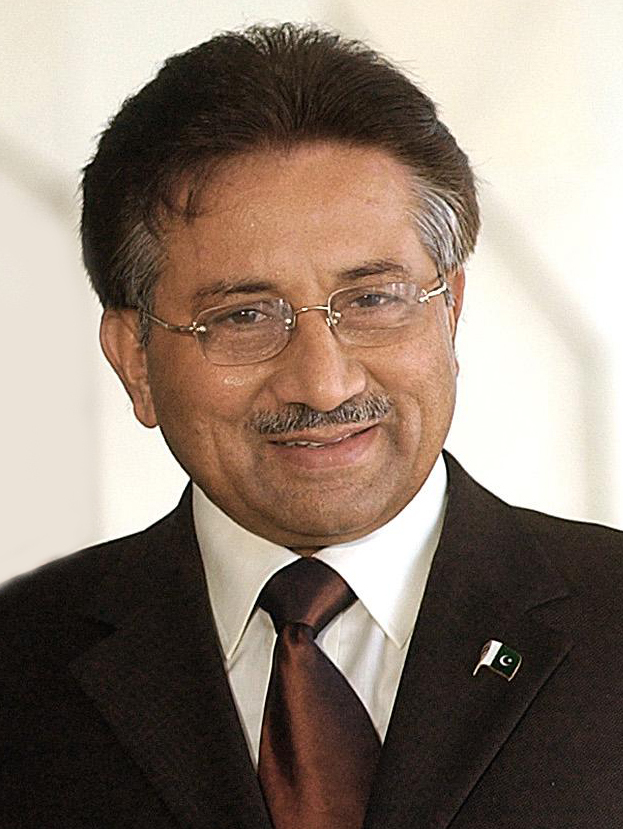
Nominee	Pervez Musharraf
Party	PML(Q)
Home state	Sindh
Electoral vote	374
States carried	2 + ICT (Note: Only includes the provinces where votes in favour of Musharraf were higher than votes against him, abstentions, or absent votes.)
Percentage	53.28%
- A map of the results, by each chamber
President before election
Pervez Musharraf
Elected President
Pervez Musharraf
PML(Q)

A confidence vote was held by the Electoral College of Pakistan on 1 January 2004, in which Pervez Musharraf won 374 out of 702 votes. As a result, according to Article 41(8) of the Constitution of Pakistan, he was "deemed to be elected" to the office of President until October, 2007.

== Composition of the Electoral College ==
The Electoral College of Pakistan is formed by a joint sitting of the six leading political bodies in Pakistan:

- the Senate of Pakistan,
- the National Assembly of Pakistan,
- the Provincial Assembly of the Punjab,
- the Provincial Assembly of Sindh,
- the Provincial Assembly of Balochistan and
- the Provincial Assembly of the North-West Frontier Province

So that each province has an equal vote, all provincial assemblies are given exactly 65 votes in the electoral college. This mean that the each member of the Punjab Assembly has 65/371 = 0.175 votes, each member of the Sindh Assembly has 65/168 = 0.387 votes, each member of the NWFP Assembly has 65/124 = 0.524 votes and each member of the Balochistan Assembly has 65/65 = 1 vote.

== Results ==
The below table shows the results of the confidence vote by each chamber. For the four provinces, the results show the weighted votes (i.e. pro-rated to a total of 65 votes).

Legislature	Votes	Absent	Abstained	Against	For
Senate	100	43	0	1	56
National Assembly	342	93	58	0	191
Punjab Province	65	19.27	1.23	0	44.50
Sindh Province	65	10.45	16.25	0	38.30
North-West Frontier Province	65	14.15	35.12	0	15.73
Balochistan Province	65	36	1	0	28
Total (rounded)	702	215	112	1	374
