= Rafiq Tarar =

President of Pakistan from 1998 to 2001

- رفیق تارڑ
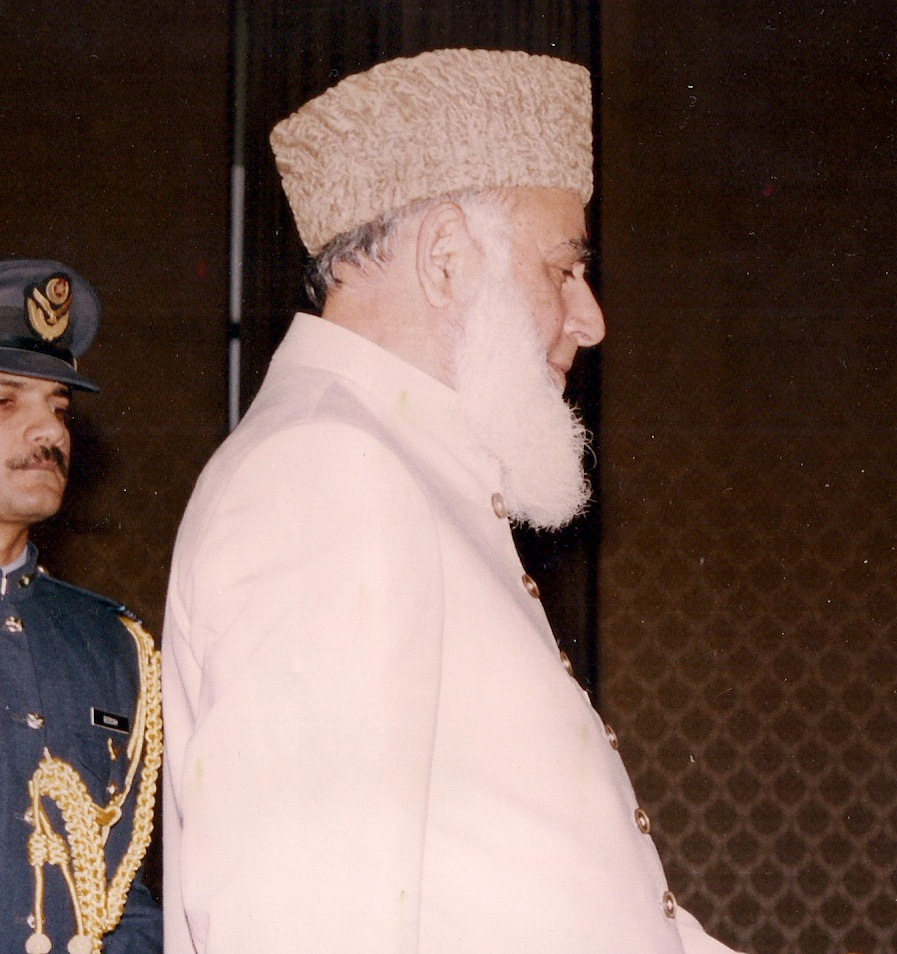
- Tarar in 2000

9th President of Pakistan
- In office 1 January 1998 – 20 June 2001
- Prime Minister: Nawaz Sharif (1998–1999)
- Chief Executive: Pervez Musharraf (1999–2001)
- Preceded by: Wasim Sajjad (Acting)
- Succeeded by: Pervez Musharraf

Member of Senate of Pakistan
- In office 1996–1998
- Succeeded by: Rafique Rajwana

Senior Justice of the Supreme Court of Pakistan
- In office 17 January 1992 – 1 November 1994
- Nominated by: Benazir Bhutto
- Appointed by: Ghulam Ishaq Khan

Chief Justice of the Lahore High Court
- In office 6 March 1989 – 31 October 1991
- Appointed by: Tikka Khan
- Preceded by: Abdul Shakurul Salam
- Succeeded by: Mian Mahboob Ahmad

Personal details
- Born: Muhammad Rafiq; 2 November 1929 Mandi Bahauddin, Punjab, British India
- Died: 7 March 2022 (aged 92) Lahore, Punjab, Pakistan
- Party: Pakistan Muslim League (N)
- Relatives: Saira Afzal Tarar (daughter-in-law); Attaullah Tarar (grandson); Bilal Farooq Tarar (grandson)
- Education: Government Islamia College, Gujranwala (BA); University of the Punjab (LLB)
- Profession: Jurist
- Cabinet: Sharif Cabinet

Muhammad Rafiq Tarar (Note: /rəˈfiːk təˈrɑːr/; Punjabi, Urdu: محمد رفیق تارڑ) (2 November 1929 – 7 March 2022) was a Pakistani politician and jurist who served as the ninth president of Pakistan from 1998 until he left office in 2001. He also served as a senator from Punjab in 1997; and, before entering politics, as a senior justice of the Supreme Court of Pakistan from 1992 to 1994 and as the chief justice of the Lahore High Court from 1989 to 1991.

Tarar was born in Mandi Bahauddin, and graduated with LLB from University of the Punjab in 1951, before starting practice as a lawyer in Lahore High Court the following year. In 1966, he pursued a career as a jurist. Tarar later served as a justice in Pakistan's highest courts. After his retirement at 65, he started a political career as a legal advisor to Nawaz Sharif. Tarar became a senator from Punjab in 1997 and was nominated the same year as presidential candidate by PML-N, but his nomination papers were rejected by the Acting Chief Election Commissioner. Barrister Ijaz Husain Batalvi assisted by M. A. Zafar and Akhtar Aly Kureshy Advocate, challenged the rejection of his nomination papers in Lahore High Court and the Full Bench set aside the rejection order of the Election Commission and he was elected president of Pakistan in the presidential election by a margin of 374 out of 457 votes of the Electoral College.

Tarar assumed office in January 1998 with heavy criticism by opposition especially from former Prime Minister Benazir Bhutto who accused him of illegally legitimizing dismissal of her government as a judge of the Supreme Court of Pakistan. As head of state, Tarar shifted Pakistan's system of government from semi-presidential system to parliamentary democratic system by signing the Thirteenth Constitutional Amendment. He surrendered his reserve power of dismissing the Prime Minister, triggering new elections and dissolving the National Assembly. He also signed the Fourteenth and Fifteenth amendment to the constitution that limited the powers of the presidency from executive to a figurehead.

Tarar was ultimately succeeded by Musharraf as President through a referendum held in 2002. Twenty months after seizing power in a coup, General Musharraf took the head of state's oath and became the fourth military ruler to become president. In 2003, Tarar claimed he was still the President.

== Early life and education ==
Muhammad Rafiq Tarar was born in Mandi Bahauddin, British India, on 2 November 1929 to a Tarar family. Tarar was influenced by Syed Ata Ullah Shah Bukhari and he took a part in political sessions of Majlis-e-Ahrar-e-Islam during British colonial rule. In his college years, he was also an activist for the All-India Muslim League and was a follower of Muhammad Ali Jinnah. During the partition of India, Tarar performed voluntary duty as a relief worker in camps set up by the All India Muslim Students Federation for Indian emigrants. He graduated with BA in Islamic Studies from Government Islamia College, Gujranwala in 1949. He acquired LLB degree in 1951 from Punjab University Law College.

== Judicial and political career ==
Tarar started a career as a lawyer, soon after completion of his studies. In 1951, he enrolled as a pleader in the Lahore High Court. He started practicing as an advocate in the same court, in later years. He established a Gujranwala-based legal aid firm in 1960s and excelled at advocacy. In 1966, Tarar started a judicial career after he appeared and passed the competitive exams to be elevated as session judge in District Courts. In 1971, he became Chairman of the Punjab Labor Court. Tarar was appointed a judge at Lahore High Court, highest appellate judicial court of Punjab province, in October 1974.

Tarar served in the Lahore High Court as a justice for decades. He was also a member of the Election Commission of Pakistan where he represented Punjab. He was appointed the 28th Chief Justice of Lahore High Court where he served from 1989 to 1991 until his appointment as a judge in the Supreme Court of Pakistan. His appointment was made by then president Ghulam Ishaq Khan with the consent of Supreme Judicial Council. He served as a senior justice of the Supreme Court of Pakistan from January 1992 to November 1994. He was also an awaiting candidate of the Chief Justice of Pakistan but he retired earlier on attaining the age of 65 years and started a political career. In 1994, following his retirement from the judiciary, Tarar entered into politics and started a political career as a legal adviser and close aide to then opposition leader Nawaz Sharif. In March 1997, he became a senator and represented Punjab in the upper-house of Pakistan until his resignation in December 1997. He was nominated as the presidential candidate by the PML(N) in the same year and secured a historical victory in the presidential election.

== Presidency (1998–2001) ==
=== Initial days ===
After Farooq Leghari's resignation in 1997, he was nominated as a candidate for the president of Pakistan. On 31 December 1997, in an indirect election, Tarar was elected by a huge margin, getting 374 of 457 votes of the Electoral College against Aftab Mirani of PPP (a PML(N)'s rival) who got 31 votes, and Muhammad Khan Shirani of JUI(S) who got 22 votes. This was the largest margin in such elections. Upon his election, former Prime Minister Benazir Bhutto delivered a speech in London to the Commonwealth Ethnic Bar Association and criticized his election. She accused him of being dishonest by saying "A former judge [Tarar] who dishonestly legitimized the overthrow of my first government was elected president of Pakistan. This same man stands accused by a former President Farooq Leghari of taking briefcases of money to bribe other judges in the famous 1997 case. The Election Commission rejected Justice Tarar's nomination for the presidency. Justice Qayyum, on leave for his mother's funeral, rushed back to grant a stay, and Tarar was elected. As for the bribery charges, Tarar, as a former judge, like former generals, is immune to prosecution in real terms."

=== Constitutional reforms ===
Upon becoming President, Tarar was an unassuming and merely ceremonial figurehead who kept a low profile, and avoided news media, and he remained a devoted servant and loyalist of the Sharif family. He readily signed the Thirteenth, Fourteenth, and Fifteenth amendments to the Constitution of Pakistan that limited the powers of the presidency.

The President of Pakistan's powers had thus been slowly removed over the years, culminating in the 1997 Thirteenth Amendment to the Constitution of Pakistan which removed virtually all remaining reserve powers, making the office almost entirely symbolic in nature as per the true spirit of the Pakistani constitution.

=== Last day in office ===
On 20 June 2001, Chief Executive General Musharraf called on Tarar at the Aiwan-e-Sadr and thanked him for supporting him. At the end of the meeting, Tarar wished Musharraf "all the best" and hoped Musharraf would succeed in making Pakistan prosperous. Tarar then left the President's official residence at around 2.30pm and was escorted by police to his hometown of Lahore with his family.

== Death ==
Tarar retired from politics and settled in Lahore, where he died after a long illness on 7 March 2022, at the age of 92.

== See also ==
- Supreme Court of Pakistan
- Supreme Court Bar Association of Pakistan

== Notes ==
Legal offices
Preceded by Abdul Shakurul Salam	Chief Justice of Lahore High Court; 1989–1991	Succeeded by Mian Mahboob Ahmad
Political offices
Preceded by Wasim Sajjad; Acting	President of Pakistan; 1998–2001	Succeeded by Pervez Musharraf
