= 2013 Pakistani by-elections =

Pakistani by election in 2013

← 2008	22 Aug 2013	2018 →

15 seats National Assembly 15 seats needed for a majority
- Turnout: 55.0%(▲10.68pp)
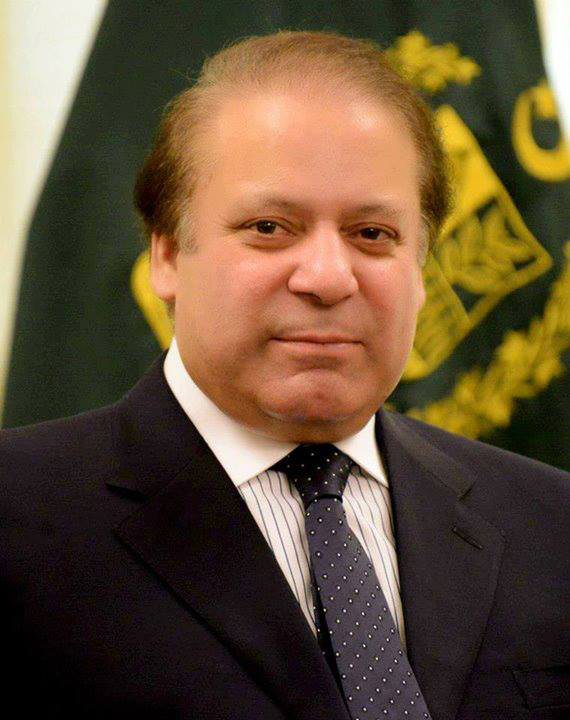

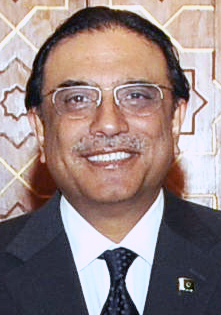

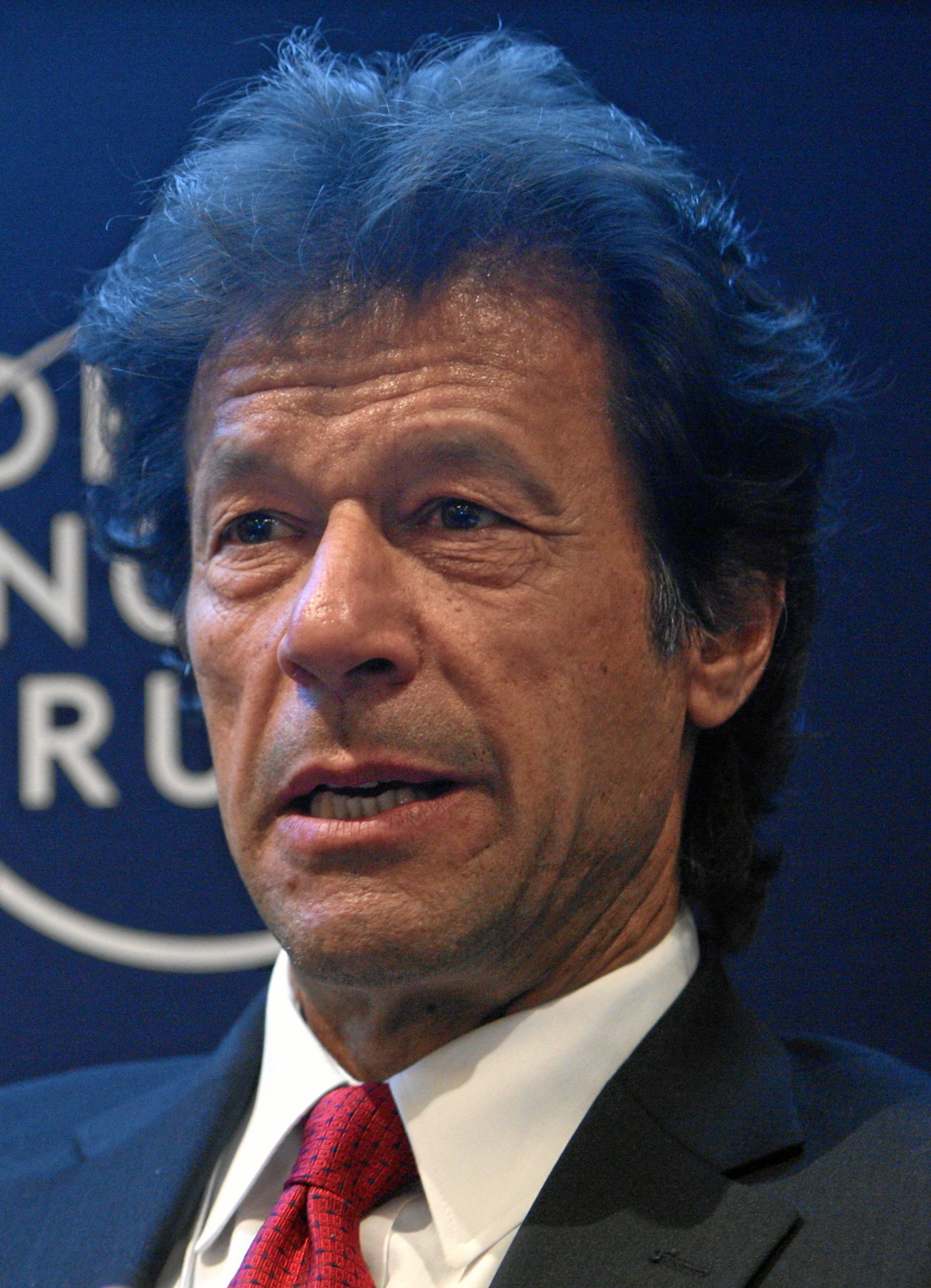
	First party	Second party	Third party
Leader	Nawaz Sharif	Asif Ali Zardari	Imran Khan
Party	PML(N)	PPP	PTI
Seats won	5	3	4
Seat change	▲	▼	New
Swing		▼15.47pp	New
Prime Minister before election
Raja Pervez Ashraf
PPP
Elected Prime Minister
Nawaz Sharif
PML(N)

Results of the 2013 Pakistani by-Election Pakistan Muslim League (N) Pakistan Peoples Party Pakistan Tehreek-e-Insaf Muttahida Qaumi Movement Jamiat Ulema-e-Islam Pakistan Muslim League (F) Pakhtun-khwa Milli Awami Party Jamaat-e-Islami National Peoples Party Pakistan Muslim League (Q) Qaumi Watan Party All Pakistan Muslim League National Party (Pakistan) Balochistan National Party Awami Jamhuri Ittehad Pakistan Awami Muslim League Pakistan Muslim League (Z) Awami National Party Independents Repoll ordered Postponed/terminated/withheld

On May 11, 2013, Pakistan held by-elections to fill 10 vacant seats in each of the four provincial assemblies and 29 vacant seats in the country's National Assembly. Following the 2013 general elections, in which the Pakistan Muslim League-Nawaz (PML-N) won the most seats in the National Assembly (166), the elections were held.

The 2013 Pakistani by-elections were held for 15 various seats in the National Assembly and four provincial assemblies. The by-elections were held to fill the seats vacated by the death, resignation, or disqualification of the elected representatives.

The PML-N government had been in power for a little over a year, and the by-elections were widely considered as a referendum on its performance. 18 of the 29 seats in the National Assembly and 7 of the 10 open seats in the provincial assemblies were won by the PML-N. Six seats in the National Assembly and two in the provincial assemblies were gained by the Pakistan Peoples Party (PPP). The Muttahida Qaumi Movement (MQM) won 2 National Assembly seats.

Allegations of rigging and violence plagued the by-elections. Violence associated with the elections claimed at least 12 lives. Due to irregularities, the Pakistani Election Commission (ECP) rejected the results for two National Assembly seats.

The PML-N's position in the government was bolstered by the results of the by-elections, which gave it a solid majority in the National Assembly. The violence and claims of vote-rigging, however, cast a shadow over the polls and called into doubt the legitimacy of Pakistan's electoral system.

== Background ==
On May 11, 2013, there were general elections. In the National Assembly, the PML-N gained 166 members, followed by the PPP with 33 seats and the MQM with 26 seats. PTI won 25 seats, or Pakistan Tehreek-e-Insaf.

The 29 seats in the National Assembly and the 10 seats in the provincial assemblies up for grabs in the by-elections were vacated for a number of reasons, including as the demise of the incumbent member, their resignation, or their disqualification.

== By-Elections by date ==
By-election 2013 held at various dates in different constitutions;

=== 12-Feb-2018 ===
On the date of 12-Feb-2018 By-election 2013 held in NA-154 Lodhran-1 constitutions.

=== 16-Jul-2017 ===
On the date of 16-Jul-2017 By-election 2013 held in NA-260 Queta-cum-chagai-cum-Nushki-cum-mustang constitutions.

=== 17-Sep-2017 ===
On the date of 17-Sep-2017 By-election 2013 held in NA-120 Lahore-iii constitutions.

=== 26-Oct-2017 ===
On the date of 26-Oct-2017 By-election 2013 held in NA-4 Peshawar IV constitutions.

=== 7-Apr-2016 ===
On the date of 7-Apr-2016 By-election 2013 held in NA-245 Karachi VII central constitutions.

=== 17-Mar-2016 ===
On the date of 17-Mar-2016 By-election 2013 held in NA-153 Multan VI constitutions.

=== 18-Jan-2016 ===
On the date of 18-Jan-2016 By-election 2013 held in NA-218 Matiari-cum-Hyderabad constitutions.

=== 19-Sep-2016 ===
On the date of 19-Sep-2016 By-election 2013 held in NA-162 Sahiwal - iii constitutions.

=== 22-Mar-2016 ===
On the date of 22-Mar-2016 By-election 2013 held in NA-101 Gujranwala-VII constitutions.

=== 28-Apr-2016 ===
On the date of 28-Apr-2016 By-election 2013 held in NA-267 Kachhi-cum-jhal magsi constitutions.

=== 28-Nov-2016 ===
On the date of 28-Nov-2016 By-election 2013 held in NA-258 Karachi-XX malir cum-Karachi west constitutions.

=== 8-Jun-2015 ===
On the date of 8-Jun-2015 By-election 2013 held in NA-108 Mandi bahaudin-i constitutions.

=== 11-Oct-2015 ===
On the date of 11-Oct-2015 By-election 2013 held in NA-122 Lahore-V and NA-144 Okara ii constitutions.

=== 15-Mar-2015 ===
On the date of 15-Mar-2015 By-election 2013 held in NA-137-Nankana sahib iii constitutions.

=== 16-Aug-2015 ===
On the date of 16-Aug-2015 By-election 2013 held in NA-19 haripur constitutions.

=== 23-Apr-2015 ===
On the date of 23-Apr-2015 By-election 2013 held in NA-246 Karachi Viii Central constitutions.

=== 23-Dec-2015 ===
On the date of 23-Dec-2015 By-election 2013 held in NA-154 Lodhran-i constitutions.

=== 6-May-2014 ===
On the date of 6-May-2014 By-election 2013 held in NA-202 Shikarpur constitutions.

=== 12-May-2014 ===
On the date of 12-May-2014 By-election 2013 held in NA-46 Triabl area XI, Khyber agency constitutions.

=== 16-Oct-2014 ===
On the date of 16-Oct-2014 By-election 2013 held in NA-149 Multan -ii constitutions.

=== 23-Jan-2014 ===
On the date of 23-Jan-2014 By-election 2013 held in NA-69 Khushab-i constitutions.

=== 18-Sep-2013 ===
On the date of 18-Sep-2013 By-election 2013 held in NA-25 DIK constitutions.

=== 22-Aug-2013 ===
On the date of 22-Aug-2013 By-election 2013 held in 15constitutions,

1. NA-1 Peshawar I
2. NA-5 Nowshera-1
3. NA-13 Swabi ii
4. NA-27 Lakki Marwat
5. NA-48 Islamabad i
6. NA-68 Sargodha-V
7. NA-71 Mianwali i
8. NA-83 Faislabad ix
9. Na-103 hafizabad II
10. NA-129 Lahore XII
11. NA-177 Muzafarabad ii
12. NA-235 Sanghar-cum-Mirpurkhas-cum-Umarkot
13. NA-237 thatta i
14. NA-254 Karachi XVI east-cum malir
15. NA-262 Killah abdulah

== Results ==
The results of the by-elections were as follows:

- National Assembly
  - PML-N: 18 seats
  - PPP: 6 seats
  - MQM: 2 seats
  - PTI: 1 seat
  - Independent: 2 seats
- Provincial assemblies
  - Punjab Assembly: PML-N: 7 seats
  - Sindh Assembly: PPP: 2 seats
  - Khyber Pakhtunkhwa Assembly: PTI: 1 seat
  - Balochistan Assembly: Independent: 1 seat

== Violence and allegations of rigging ==
Violence associated with the elections claimed at least 12 lives. There was violence throughout the nation, notably in Karachi, Lahore, and Rawalpindi.

Additionally, there were claims that the by-elections had been rigged. The PML-N was accused of manipulating the elections by the PPP and the MQM. Due to anomalies, the ECP invalidated the results for two seats in the National Assembly.

== Impact ==
The PML-N's position in the government was bolstered by the results of the by-elections, which gave it a solid majority in the National Assembly. The violence and claims of vote-rigging, however, cast a shadow over the polls and called into doubt the legitimacy of Pakistan's electoral system.

== Read More ==
- 2013 Pakistani general election
- List of members of the 14th National Assembly of Pakistan
