= Federal Ombudsman Secretariat for Protection Against Harassment =

Ombudsman Secretariat in Pakistan

Federal Ombudsman Secretariat for Protection Against Harassment or Federal Ombudsman Secretariat for Protection Against Harassment At Workplace (FOSPAH) is an autonomous quasi-judicial body in Pakistan working under Act No. IV of 2010 and The Enforcement of Women's Property Rights Act, 2020, for protection against harassment at the workplace. It also has jurisdiction to hear cases related to inheritance of property by women in the country. Kashmala Tariq is the current Federal Ombudsman for Protection Against Harassment. The body was established in 2010.
