= Electoral College (Pakistan) =

President-electing body in Pakistan

An electoral college (Urdu: جماعت انتخاب کنندگان, romanised: Jamā't-e Intikhāb-e Kunindagān) is constituted ad hoc to elect the president of Pakistan as the head of state and federation. It consists of the Senate, the National Assembly, and the four provincial assemblies, under Article 41(3) of the Constitution of Pakistan.

Members of the National Assembly and Provincial Assemblies are directly elected by the people in competitive multi-party elections. Members of the Senate are indirectly elected by the provincial assemblies, for a term of six years.

== Electoral system ==
The President of Pakistan is indirectly elected by the Electoral College of Pakistan – a joint sitting of the Senate, National Assembly and Provincial Assemblies.

The votes of the members of the Senate and National Assembly are counted as single votes. Meanwhile, the votes given by the provincial assembly legislators are adjusted so as to give each province an equal share in the election. This is so because, each provincial assembly has a varying number of members, depending upon population size. The largest province by population size, Punjab, has a total of 371 members in its assembly, whereas the smallest province of Balochistan has a mere 65 members in its legislature. Therefore, the provincial votes are weighted against the Balochistan assembly in the following manner:

Provincial Assembly	Members	Weightage of each vote	Total votes
Balochistan	65	1	65
Khyber-Pakhtunkhwa	145	0.448	65
Punjab	371	0.175	65
Sindh	168	0.387	65

Regarding timing, the constitution states that election to the office of President must be held no earlier than sixty days and no later than thirty days before the expiration of the term of the incumbent president. If assemblies are not present, the constitution allows the election of president to be delayed thirty days after the general election.

The electoral process itself is done via a secret ballot due to the post of the president being constitutionally non-partisan. Therefore, unlike during the election of the Prime Minister, cross-party voting is not liable to be considered defection.

== See also ==
- Elections in Pakistan
- President of Pakistan
- Election Commission of Pakistan
- Constitution of Pakistan
