= Politics of Pakistan =

Politics of Pakistan سیاسیاتِ پاکستان
- State emblem of Pakistan
- Polity type: Federal parliamentary constitutional republic
- Constitution: Constitution of Pakistan

Legislative branch
- Name: Parliament
- Type: Bicameral
- Upper house
- Name: Senate
- Presiding officer: Yusuf Raza Gilani, Chairman
- Appointer: Elected by the Senate
- Lower house
- Name: National Assembly
- Presiding officer: Ayaz Sadiq, Speaker
- Appointer: Elected by the National Assembly

Executive branch
- Head of state
- Title: President
- Currently: Asif Ali Zardari
- Appointer: Electoral College
- Head of government
- Title: Prime Minister
- Currently: Shehbaz Sharif
- Appointer: Election Commission of Pakistan through General Elections: by a Convention that is held in the National Assembly, based on appointee's ability to command confidence among the majority of the members.
- Cabinet
- Name: Cabinet of Pakistan
- Current cabinet: Shehbaz Sharif ministry
- Leader: Prime Minister
- Appointer: President
- Headquarters: Pakistan Secretariat
- Ministries: 30

Judicial branch
- Name: Judiciary of Pakistan
- Supreme Court
- Chief judge: Yahya Afridi
- Seat: Supreme Court Building

The Politics of Pakistan (سیاسیاتِ پاکستان ; ALA-LC: Siyāsiyāt-e-Pākistān) takes place within the framework established by the constitution. The country is a federal parliamentary republic in which provincial governments enjoy a high degree of autonomy and residuary powers. Executive power is vested with the national cabinet which is headed by Prime Minister of Pakistan (Shehbaz Sharif since 3 March 2024), who works with the bicameral parliament and the judiciary. Stipulations set by the constitution provide a delicate check and balance of sharing powers between executive, legislative, and judicial branches of the government.

The head of state is the president who is elected by the electoral college for a five-year term. Asif Ali Zardari is currently the president of Pakistan (since 2024). The president was a significant authority until the 18th amendment, passed in 2010, stripped the presidency of most of its powers. Since then, Pakistan has shifted from a Semi-presidential system to a purely parliamentary government. Since the amendment, the president's powers include the right to pardon and the ability to suspend or moderate any sentence passed by any court or authority.

The government consists of three branches: executive, legislative and judicial. The Executive branch consists of the Cabinet and is led by the Prime Minister. It is totally independent of the legislative branch that consists of a bicameral parliament. The Upper House is the Senate whilst the National Assembly is the lower house. The Judicial branch forms with the composition of the Supreme Court as an apex court, alongside the high courts and other inferior courts. The judiciary's function is to interpret the Constitution and federal laws and regulations.

Pakistan is a multiparty democracy where several political parties compete for seats in the National and Provincial assemblies. However, as an aftermath of the Fall of Dhaka in 1971, a two-party system was developed between the People's Party and Muslim League. There has also been a sharp rise in the popularity of centrist parties such as PML-Q and PTI or AP. The Armed Forces has historically played an influential role in the country's politics, although it has declined in recent years. From the 1950s to 2000s, several coups were staged that overthrew democratic regimes. After the resignation of President Pervez Musharraf in 2008, a sharp line has been drawn between the "military establishment" and politics and Pakistan is moving closer to becoming a democracy after general elections in 2013. Imran Khan ascended to leadership in 2018 with the backing of the military establishment, but was subsequently removed from power in 2022 after losing that support. In the February 2024 general election, independent candidates backed by Khan's PTI won the largest bloc of National Assembly seats, but Khan remained in prison and a PML-N–PPP coalition formed the government, with Shehbaz Sharif elected prime minister on 3 March 2024. No Prime Minister of Pakistan has ever completed their full length tenure.

The Economist Intelligence Unit rated Pakistan an "authoritarian regime" in 2023. According to the V-Dem Democracy indices Pakistan was autocratising in 2024. In 2023, according to Freedom in the World, report by Freedom House, Pakistan is categorised as a "partly free" country, and it is categorised as "not free" in terms of internet freedom.

== Executive branch ==
The current and former Presidents of Pakistan, in keeping with the constitutional provision that the state religion is Islam, must be Muslim. Elected for a five-year term by an Electoral College consisting of members of the Senate and National Assembly and members of the provincial assemblies, the president is eligible for re-election. But no individual may hold the office for more than two consecutive terms. The president may resign or be impeached and may be removed from office due to incapacity or gross misconduct by a two-thirds vote of the members of the parliament. The president generally acts on the advice of the prime minister but has important residual powers.

In the past one of these powers —a legacy of military dictator General Muhammad Zia-ul-Haq— has included the president's discretionary ability to dissolve the National Assembly when "a situation has arisen in which the Government of the Federation cannot be carried on in accordance with the provisions of the Constitution and an appeal to the electorate is necessary." This power has twice been granted —by the Eighth Amendment in 1985 (under the Zia dictatorship) and by the Seventeenth Amendment in 2003 (under the military rule of General Pervez Musharraf) —and has twice been revoked— by the Thirteenth Amendment in 1997 (by the Pakistan Muslim League (N)) and under the Eighteenth Amendment in 2010 (by the Pakistan Peoples Party). Despite this most recent power-stripping, the President remains the ex officio chair of the National Security Council, as per the National Security Act 2004.

The prime minister is appointed by the members of the National Assembly through a vote. The prime minister is assisted by the Federal Cabinet, a council of ministers whose members are appointed by the president on the advice of the prime minister. The Federal Cabinet consists of ministers, ministers of state, and advisers. As of early 1994, there were thirty-three ministerial portfolios: commerce; communications; culture; defence; defence production; education; environment; finance and economic affairs; food and agriculture; foreign affairs; health; housing; information and broadcasting; interior; Kashmiri affairs and Northern Areas; law and justice; local government; minority affairs; narcotics control; parliamentary affairs; petroleum and natural resources production; planning and development; railways; religious affairs; science and technology; social welfare; special education; sports; state and frontier regions; tourism; water and power; women's development; and youth affairs.

== Legislative branch ==
The bicameral federal legislature consists of the Senate (upper house) and National Assembly (lower house). According to Article 50 of the Constitution, the National Assembly, the Senate and the President together make up a body known as the Majlis-e-Shoora (Council of Advisers).

Pakistan's democracy has no recall method. However, past governments have been dismissed for corruption by the President's invocation of Article 58 of the Constitution. The President's power to dismiss the Prime Minister and dissolve the National Assembly was removed by the Thirteenth Amendment and partially restored by the Seventeenth Amendment.

=== Senate ===
The Senate is a permanent legislative body with equal representation from each of the four provinces, elected by the members of their respective provincial assemblies. There are representatives from the Federally Administered Tribal Areas and from Islamabad Capital Territory. The chairman of the Senate, under the constitution, is next in line to act as president should the office become vacant and until such time as a new president can be formally elected. Both the Senate and the National Assembly can initiate and pass legislation except for finance bills. Only the National Assembly can approve the federal budget and all finance bills. In the case of other bills, the president may prevent passage unless the legislature in joint sitting overrules the president by a majority of members of both houses present and voting. Unlike the National Assembly, the Senate cannot be dissolved by the President.

=== National Assembly ===
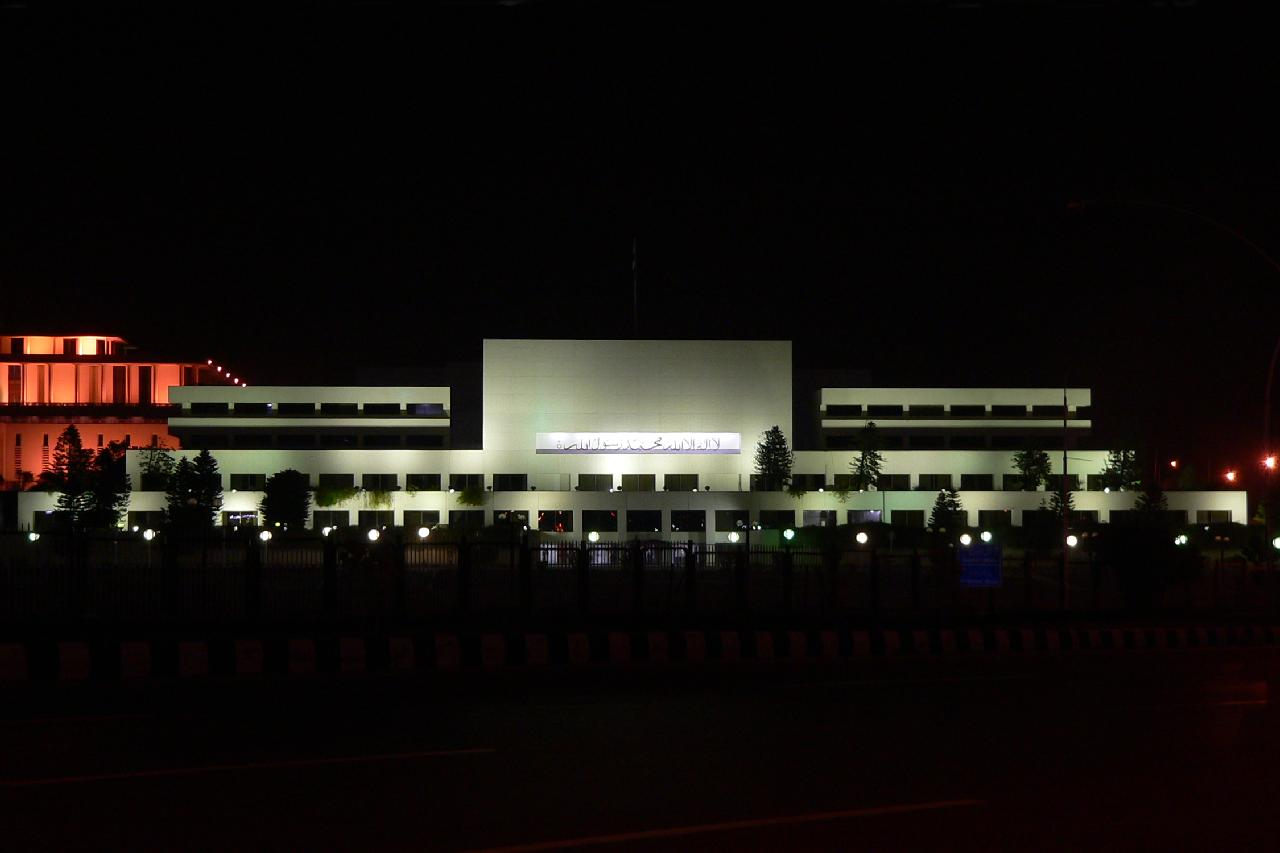
National Assembly of Pakistan

Members of the National Assembly are elected by universal adult suffrage (formerly twenty-one years of age and older but the seventeenth amendment changed it to eighteen years of age.). Seats are allocated to each of the four provinces, the Federally Administered Tribal Areas, and Islamabad Capital Territory on the basis of population. National Assembly members serve for the parliamentary term, which is five years, unless they die or resign sooner, or unless the National Assembly is dissolved. Although the vast majority of the members are Muslim, about 5 per cent of the seats are reserved for minorities, including Christians, Hindus, and Sikhs. Elections for minority seats are held on the basis of separate electorates at the same time as the polls for Muslim seats during the general elections.

== Judicial Branch ==
The judiciary includes the Supreme Court, provincial high courts, District & sessions Courts, Civil and Magistrate courts exercising civil and criminal jurisdiction. Some federal and provincial courts and tribunals such as Services court, Income tax & excise court, Banking court and Boards of Revenue's Tribunals are as well established in all provinces.

=== Supreme Court ===
In reference of ARTICLE 175 (A) APPOINTMENT OF JUDGES

The Supreme Court has original, appellate, and advisory jurisdiction.

(1) There shall be a Judicial Commission of Pakistan, hereinafter in this Article referred to as the commission, for appointment of Judges of the Supreme Court, High Courts and the Federal Shariat Court, as hereinafter provided.

(2) For appointment of Judges of the Supreme Court, the Commission shall consist of---

(i) Chief Justice of Pakistan; Chairman (ii) [four] most senior Judges of the Supreme Court;Member (iii) a former Chief Justice or a former Judge of the Supreme Court of Pakistan to be nominated by the Chief Justice of Pakistan, in consultation with the [four] member Judges, for a term of two years; Member (iv) Federal Minister for Law and Justice;Member (v) Attorney-General for Pakistan; and Member (vi) a Senior Advocate of the Supreme Court of Pakistan nominated by the Pakistan Bar Council for a term of two years.

(3) Now withstanding anything contained in clause (1) or clause (2), the President shall appoint the most senior Judge of the Supreme Court as the Chief Justice of Pakistan. The chief justice and judges of the Supreme Court may remain in office until age sixty-five: now 68 years and this is also another clause of seventeenth amendment.

=== Federal Shariat Court of Pakistan ===
The Federal Shariat Court (FSC) of Pakistan is a court which has the power to examine and determine whether the laws of the country comply with Shari'a law. It consists of 8 Muslim judges appointed by the President of Pakistan after consulting the Chief Justice of this Court, from amongst the serving or retired judges of the Supreme Court or a High Court or from amongst persons possessing the qualifications of judges of a High Court. Of the eight judges, three are required to be Ulema who are well versed in Islamic law. The judges hold office for a period of three years, which may eventually be extended by the President. Appeal against its decisions lie to the Shariat Appellate Bench of the Supreme Court, consisting of three Muslim judges of the Supreme Court and two Ulema, appointed by the President. If any part of the law is declared to be against Islamic law, the government is required to take the necessary steps to amend such law appropriately. The court also exercises revisional jurisdiction over the criminal courts, deciding Hudood cases. The decisions of the court are binding on the High Courts as well as subordinate judiciary. The court appoints its own staff and frames its own rules of procedure. Ever since its establishment in 1980, the Federal Shariat Court of Pakistan has been the subject of criticism and controversy in society. Created as an Islamisation measure by the military regime and subsequently protected under the controversial 8th Amendment, its opponents question the very rationale and utility of this institution. It is stated that this court merely duplicates the functions of the existing superior courts and also operates as a check on the sovereignty of Parliament. The composition of the court, particularly the mode of appointment of its judges and the insecurity of their tenure, is taken exception to, and it is alleged, that this court does not fully meet the criterion prescribed for the independence of the judiciary. That is to say, it is not immune to pressures and influences from the Executive. In the past, this court was used as a refuge for the recalcitrant judges. And whereas some of its judgements, particularly the ones which rely on the Islamic concept of equity, justice and fair play, expanded and enlarged the scope and contents of individual's rights were commended, others that tend to restrict the rights of women, are severely criticised and deplored.

=== Provincial High Courts ===
In every province, there is one High Court. Currently all four provinces Punjab, Sindh, Khyber Pakhtunkhwa and Balochistan have High courts, respectively called Lahore High Court, Sindh High Court, Peshawar High Court, and Balochistan High Court. After the approval of 18th Constitutional Amendment in April 2010, a new High court is established at Federal Capital Islamabad with the name of Islamabad High Court. In 18th Amendment, judges appointments are proposed by a Parliamentary Commission. Judges of the provincial high courts were, previously appointed (The seventeenth amendment give these powers to the president, previously Prime minister exercised them) by the president after consultation with the chief justice of the Supreme Court, as well as the governor of the province and the chief justice of the high court to which the appointment is being made. High courts have original and appellate jurisdiction.

In addition, there are special courts and tribunals to deal with specific kinds of cases, such as drug courts, commercial courts, labour courts, traffic courts, an insurance appellate tribunal, an income tax appellate tribunal, and special courts for bank offences. There are also special courts to try terrorists. Appeals from special courts go to high courts except for labour and traffic courts, which have their own forums for appeal. Appeals from the tribunals go to the Supreme Court.

=== Ombudsman/Mohtasib ===
A further feature of the judicial system is the office of Mohtasib (Ombudsman), which is provided for in the constitution. The office of Mohtasib was established in many early Muslim states to ensure that no wrongs were done to citizens. Appointed by the president, the Mohtasib holds office for four years; the term cannot be extended or renewed. The Mohtasib's purpose is to institutionalise a system for enforcing administrative accountability, through investigating and rectifying any injustice done to a person through maladministration by a federal agency or a federal government official. The Mohtasib is empowered to award compensation to those who have suffered loss or damage as a result of maladministration. Excluded from jurisdiction, however, are personal grievances or service matters of a public servant as well as matters relating to foreign affairs, national defence, and the armed services. This institution is designed to bridge the gap between administrator and citizen, to improve administrative processes and procedures, and to help curb misuse of discretionary powers.

Pakistan has been ruled by both democratic and military governments. The first decade was marred with political unrest and instability, with frequent collapses of civilian democratic governments that eventually led to the 1958 military coup. From 1947 until now, Pakistan has been governed by various of both right-wing conservative governments and left-wing socialistic oriented governments, while neither far-right and far-left had failed to achieve enough majority to claim the exclusive mandate. From 1947 to 1958 as many as seven Prime Ministers of Pakistan either resigned or were ousted. On 7 October 1958 Pakistan's civilian and first President Iskander Mirza in collaboration with General Mohammad Ayub Khan abrogated Pakistan's constitution and declared Martial Law.

General Ayub Khan was the president from 1958 to 1969, and General Yahya Khan from 1969 to 1971, Chief Justice Habib Khan Marvath elected first Chairman Senate of Pakistan. Civilian, yet socialist-oriented autocratic, rule continued from 1972 to 1977 under Zulfikar Ali Bhutto, but he was deposed by General Zia-Ul-Haq. General Zia was killed in a plane crash in 1988, after which Benazir Bhutto, daughter of Zulfikar Ali Bhutto, was elected as the Prime Minister of Pakistan. She was the youngest woman ever to be elected the Head of Government and the first woman to be elected as the Head of Government of a Muslim country. Her government was followed by that of Nawaz Sharif, and the two leaders alternated until the military coup by General Pervez Musharraf in 1999. From the resignation of President Rafiq Tarar in 2001, to his own resignation in 2008, Musharraf was the President of Pakistan. In 2008, Asif Ali Zardari was elected president.

== Form of government ==
Officially a federal Islamic republic, Pakistan has had a long history of alternating periods of electoral democracy and authoritarian military government. Military presidents include General Ayub Khan in the 1960s, General Yahya Khan, General Zia ul Haq in the 1980s, and General Pervez Musharraf from 1999. However, a majority of Pakistan's Heads of State and Heads of Government have been elected civilian leaders. General elections were held in October 2002. After monitoring the elections, the Commonwealth Observer Group stated in conclusion:

We believe that on election day this was a credible election: the will of the people was expressed and the results reflected their wishes. However, in the context of various measures taken by the government we are not persuaded of the overall fairness of the process as a whole.

On 22 May 2004, the Commonwealth Ministerial Action Group re-admitted Pakistan into the Commonwealth, formally acknowledging its progress in returning to democracy.

=== Kashmir in Pakistani politics ===
Kashmir (Azad Kashmir) has its own constitution, the Azad Jammu and Kashmir Interim Constitution Act of 1974, and a locally chosen parliamentary form of government, as described above. The constitution allows for many of the structures that compose a self-governing state, including a legislative assembly elected through periodic elections, a prime minister who commands the majority in the assembly, an indirectly elected president, an independent judiciary, and local government institutions.

However, an override exists in the form of Section 56 of the Jammu and Kashmir Interim Constitution Act (which was drafted by the Federal Ministries of Law and Kashmir Affairs in Islamabad), the Pakistani government can dismiss any elected government in Azad Kashmir irrespective of the support it may enjoy in the AJK Legislative Assembly. The Interim Constitution Act provides for two executive forums—the Azad Kashmir Government in Muzaffarabad and the Azad Kashmir Council in Islamabad.

The latter body, presided over by the Prime Minister of Pakistan, exercises paramount authority over the AJK Legislative Assembly, which cannot challenge decisions of the council. The council is under the numerical control of the federal government in Islamabad, as in addition to the Pakistani prime minister it comprises six other federal ministers, the minister of Kashmir affairs as the ex-officio member, the prime minister of Azad Kashmir, and six Azad Kashmir members elected by the Legislative Assembly.38 The interim constitution act lists fifty-two subjects—virtually everything of any importance—that are under the jurisdiction of the Azad Kashmir Council, which has been described as the "supra power" by the Azad Kashmir High Court. Its decisions are final and not subject to judicial review.

Thus, Azad Kashmir remains for all intents and purposes under Pakistan's strict control, exercising no real sovereignty of its own. From the outset, the institutional set up in the territory was designed to ensure Pakistan's control of the area's affairs. According to the United Nations Commission for India and Pakistan (UNCIP) 39 resolutions, Azad Kashmir is neither a sovereign state nor a province of Pakistan, but rather a "local authority" with responsibility over the area assigned to it under the current 2003 ceasefire line agreement. 40 The "local authority" or Provisional government of Azad Kashmir as established in October 1947 handed over to Pakistan under the Karachi Agreement of 28 April 1949, matters related to defence, foreign affairs, negotiations with the UNCIP and coordination of all affairs relating to Gilgit and Baltistan (strategically important territories that now constitute Pakistan's "Northern Areas").

=== Provincial Governments ===
Pakistan is subdivided into four provinces, one territory, one territory administered by Pakistan as a nominally self-governing entity, and one capital territory. Each province has a Provincial Assembly, a directly elected legislature. Members are elected for five-year terms. Each Assembly elects a Chief Minister, who then selects the ministers of his or her cabinet.

- Islamabad Capital Territory
- Balochistan
- Khyber Pakhtunkhwa
- Punjab
- Sindh
- Gilgit–Baltistan
- Azad Kashmir

=== Municipal Governments ===
Pakistan's provinces are divided into districts called zillas in local languages (counterpart to a county in US or UK terminology). A zilla is further subdivided into tehsils (roughly equivalent to a borough in an integrated multi-tier (federated) systemic context, such as the one to be found in Montreal (Canada, 2002) and Birmingham (UK, 2001 announcement) or known as arrondissements in French context. Tehsils may contain town or municipalities. Pakistan's system is the one that applies an integrated federated systemic framework most comprehensively, so far.

This methodology is not new to the region, as it is similar to what is referred to as the old Panchayat Raj system in India that was introduced by Britain during the colonial era. In the 1890s Britain had become the first nation to adapt the two-tier administrative framework of revolutionary Paris (1790) onto pre-existing parish councils in the urban context (London) and into three tiers in the rural context (county, district, parish councils). In India it was implemented in some regions and not others; and then allowed to lie fallow. It got new life after the very successful West Bengal revival in the 1970s, which eventually inspired the 1990s Constitutional Amendment making it national policy.

The main difference is that Pakistan is the only country with an urban framework, as well, in the region today; and Pakistan's system has common-representational framework between tiers (as Montreal and Birmingham also have in two-tier context—even though Birmingham is working on implementing a three-tier system); and, it has a bottom-up representational framework like the Canadian example. Pakistan had the only three-tier integrated bottom-up common-representational local government system, until it was adapted for another country in 2003. UK, the country which first introduced this methodology in the region, also has the urban examples of London and Birmingham (being implemented in the post-2001 era by building on steps first introduced in the 1980s); as does France (where largest cities and smaller units have created such frameworks either by devolution (Marseilles and Lyon, in addition to Paris) or by integration of neighbouring units (such as the Nantes region pursuant to the Marcellin Act of the 1970s); and Canada.

This methodology is being increasingly adapted, as it delivers greater systemic productivity, being a more inclusive framework that provides greater regional integration. In the US, the seven county Twin Cities (MN) regional system and Portland (OR) Metro are both the most integrated US examples; but, also those often cited in the US for what they have achieved. These US examples — with their multi-county framework — are similar to what is in place in France after regional unit introduction (making France have a three-tier systemic framework also in the Commune (municipal/lowest tier local unit), Department (county), Regional unit context). Multi-county frameworks are suitable for a very suburbanised system like in the US. After France and Britain, the Indian colony of Britain was the third region to see this methodology implemented.

There are over five thousand local governments in Pakistan. Since 2001, the vast majority of these have been led by democratically elected local councils, each headed by a Nazim (mayor or supervisor.) Council elections are held every four years.

== Foreign relations ==
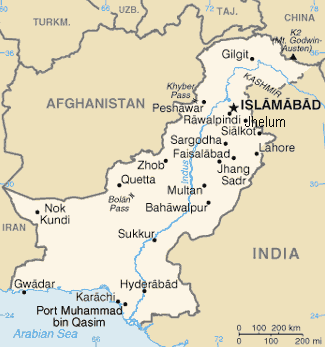
The Map of Pakistan

Pakistan is the second largest Muslim country in terms of population, and its status as a declared nuclear power, being the only Muslim nation to have that status, plays a part in its international role. It is also an active member of the United Nations. Historically, its foreign policy has encompassed difficult relations with India, a desire for a stable Afghanistan, long-standing close relations with the People's Republic of China, extensive security and economic interests in the Persian Gulf and wide-ranging bilateral relations with the United States and other Western countries. Pakistan is also an important member of the Organisation of Islamic Cooperation (OIC). Pakistan has used the OIC as a forum for Enlightened Moderation, its plan to promote a renaissance and enlightenment in the Islamic world.

Wary of Soviet expansion, Pakistan had strong relations with both the United States of America and the People's Republic of China during much of the Cold War. It was a member of the CENTO and SEATO military alliances. Its alliance with the United States was especially close after the Soviets invaded the neighbouring country of Afghanistan.

In 1964, Pakistan signed the Regional Cooperation for Development (RCD) Pact with Turkey and Iran, when all three countries were closely allied with the US, and as neighbours of the Soviet Union, wary of perceived Soviet expansionism. To this day, Pakistan has a close relationship with Turkey. RCD became defunct after the Iranian Revolution, and a Pakistani-Turkish initiative led to the founding of the Economic Cooperation Organization (ECO) in 1985. Pakistan's relations with India have improved recently and this has opened up Pakistan's foreign policy to issues beyond security. This development might completely change the complexion of Pakistan's foreign relations. Pakistan joined Non-Aligned Movement in 1979. But Pakistan's non-alignment is highly contested as it shows significant inclination towards China in all spheres, including politics.

Pakistan's relations are further deteriorating with America and its allies due to closeness of Pakistan with China, as the United States and China are competing over several issues including trade, supply chains, geopolitics and military technology development. Pakistan's decades-long rivalry and conflict with US strategic partner India also poses difficulties for the country's efforts to improve relations with the United States.

=== Involvement of foreigners with Pakistani politics and politicians ===
At times there have been claims of foreigners getting very close to Pakistani political leaderships and deep state dispensations and have had possible indirect influential roles. Nahid Iskander Mirza (1919-2019), also cousin to Nusarat Bhutto, who was allegedly the wife of a military attaché at the Iranian embassy in Pakistan, married Iskander Mirza, erstwhile president of Pakistan and claimed to have been instrumental in meeting out boundary concessions to Iran. Joanne Herring, an American socialite, is widely believed to have influenced General Zia Ul Haq's foreign policies. Since the 2010s another American socialite Cynthia D. Ritchie claims her close association with Pakistani establishment.

In January 2025, a committee of Pakistan's National Assembly was informed that over 22,000 bureaucrats held dual nationality, prompting concerns regarding potential implications for public service integrity. The revelation emerged during a meeting of the NA Standing Committee on Interior. Committee members questioned why dual citizenship was prohibited for judges and parliamentarians but permitted for bureaucrats and called for legislative measures to restrict such practices. Concerns were also raised about the relaxation of dual nationality rules, citing the example of the chairman of the National Accountability Bureau (NAB). The committee further discussed whether the National Database and Registration Authority (NADRA) maintained comprehensive records of dual nationals and their associated countries. Critics argued that this discrepancy allowed influential individuals to retain foreign affiliations without accountability.

==== Allegations against bureaucrats ====
In August 2025, Defence Minister Khawaja Asif alleged that a significant portion of Pakistan's civil bureaucracy, reportedly more than half, had acquired property in Portugal and was seeking its citizenship, linking the trend to widespread corruption within bureaucratic ranks. Asif's statement, made via his official social media account, drew strong reactions from relevant institutions. Both the Establishment Division and the National Accountability Bureau (NAB) stated that they had no evidence or intelligence supporting the minister’s claims and confirmed that no such investigations were underway. Officials emphasised that while corruption had existed in some segments of the bureaucracy, sweeping generalisations were not supported by available records and had negatively impacted institutional morale.

== Sensitive issues ==
=== Judicial Independence ===
Former Justice of the Supreme Court Mansoor Ali Shah remarked that the Twenty-Sixth Constitutional Amendment to the Constitution marked the primary step in "a deliberate campaign to erode judicial independence." After resigning over the Twenty-Seventh Amendment, he stated that the new Federal Constitutional Court (FCC) was created "not by constitutional wisdom, but by political expediency." The International Commission of Jurists also expressed concern over judicial independence by arguing that the appointing body should not be under the direct control of the executive. It stated that that requirement was not met in the appointment of the Chief Justice and the first batch of judges of the FCC.

=== Political neutrality of Military ===
The influence of the Pakistani military in politics has always been a topic of debate. The Freedom House also commented that the military exerts enormous influence over security and policy issues, intimidates the press, and enjoys impunity for indiscriminate or extralegal use of force.

Throughout Pakistan's history, the military consistently maintained a dominant role over the civilian government, a trend that continued into the 2020s. Historical precedent showed that Pakistan’s military rulers, including President Ayub Khan in the 1960s, General Muhammad Zia-ul-Haq in the 1980s, and General Pervez Musharraf in the 2000s, all developed close ties with the United States and were formally received by US presidents only after assuming power as heads of state. This pattern reinforced perceptions of the military as the country’s primary power centre. In this context, the elevation of General Asim Munir to the rank of field marshal was viewed by experts as further evidence of military dominance, despite the formal presence of a civilian government. Analysts noted that Munir’s meeting with US President Donald Trump symbolised the continuation of a military-to-military channel that bypassed civilian authorities, raising concerns about democratic backsliding. Critics argued that such developments undermined public participation and transparency in national decision-making, contributing to broader political and societal disillusionment.

In 2023, political chaos, economic crisis and security threats tested Pakistan’s fragile state as the military sought to retain control. In May, Pakistan witnessed a staggering record inflation rate of 38 per cent compared to the same period the previous year. Between 2022 and 2023, the average inflation rate stood at 30 per cent, significantly impacting the affordability of daily essentials. The economy teetered on the brink of collapse.

On 20 June 2025, Defense Minister Khawaja Asif publicly endorsed what he described as a "hybrid model" of governance, in which the military held significant influence over the civilian government and state affairs through an informal power-sharing arrangement.

In an interview with Dawn, political analyst Dr. Rasul Bakhsh Rais described the Shehbaz Sharif administration as the third iteration of a "hybrid regime" following the ouster of Imran Khan. He argued that, unlike past military-led governments under General Zia-ul-Haq and General Pervez Musharraf which formed political fronts by fragmenting major parties, this model involves the Pakistan Muslim League-Nawaz (PML-N) and Pakistan Peoples Party (PPP) voluntarily serving as a political façade for the military establishment. According to Dr. Rais, this cooperation was driven by the parties' desire to have corruption cases dismissed and to retain political relevance amid the growing popularity of Pakistan Tehreek-e-Insaf (PTI). He further stated that the establishment, by facilitating electoral victories for the PML-N and PPP, had effectively reduced them to "appendages" within the broader hybrid framework.

Ayesha Siddiqa has argued that Pakistan is not just a hybrid regime but a case of "constitutional militarism," sanctioned by a parliament that has legislated away its own relevance.

Article 243 has been a contentious issue as well. Since Zia-ul Haq's presidency, Pakistan’s Constitution has seen shifts in military control. In 1985, Zia, as president, introduced the Revival of the Constitution Order, giving the president supreme command and the power to appoint military chiefs, sidelining the prime minister. The 13th Amendment in 1997 restored the prime minister’s authority over appointments, but the 17th Amendment in 2003, under General Pervez Musharraf, gave the president more control. The 18th Amendment in 2010 once again made military appointments subject to the prime minister’s advice.

The 27th Constitutional Amendment Bill, introduced in Pakistan’s Senate in November 2025, proposed major changes to the military leadership structure by amending Article 243. It abolished the post of Chairman Joint Chiefs of Staff Committee and established the Chief of Army Staff as the constitutionally recognised Chief of Defence Forces. The bill also proposed granting life-long constitutional protection, privileges, and immunities to five-star ranked officials such as the Field Marshal Asim Munir, who himself would be subject to a lifetime immunity. Critics argued that it risked further consolidating military authority and diminishing civilian oversight, potentially upsetting the balance of civil-military relations. The bill was passed on 12 November. Opposition politicians, judges, and experts criticised the 27th Amendment as a sign of democratic decline and increased military dominance, with analyst Shuja Nawaz describing Pakistan’s civil-military system as a "hybrid system" that is "a misalliance and destined to the same fate as most unequal marriages."

=== Censorship and digital crackdown ===
Citing data from the Open Observatory of Network Interference or OONI, a 2025 report by Amnesty International confirmed that just before the 2024 Pakistani general election, several websites were blocked, including the opposition Pakistan Tehreek-e-Insaf (PTI) party website, PTI candidates’ websites, and the investigative news outlet Fact Focus. These internet restrictions, which also involved selective blocking and bandwidth throttling, were observed particularly in the lead-up to the elections and during virtual rallies held by PTI.

== See also ==
- Blasphemy laws in Pakistan
- Censorship in Pakistan
- Secularism in Pakistan
- Court system of Pakistan
- Democracy in Pakistan
- Government of Pakistan
- List of Pakistani political families
- Pakistan National Commission for Minorities
- Political families of Pakistan
- Political history of Pakistan
- Political parties in Pakistan
