= Article 58(2)(b) of the Constitution of Pakistan =

Former constitutional provision of Pakistan

Article 58(2)(b) of the Constitution of Pakistan, commonly written as Article 58(2)(b), was a constitutional provision that empowered the President of Pakistan to dissolve the National Assembly of Pakistan in his discretion if he concluded that the federal government could not be carried on in accordance with the Constitution and that an appeal to the electorate was necessary. The clause was introduced in 1985 under the Revival of the Constitution of 1973 Order, 1985 and was later ratified the same year by the Eighth Amendment. It was omitted by the Thirteenth Amendment in 1997, restored by the Legal Framework Order, 2002, further modified by the Seventeenth Amendment in 2003, and removed when Article 58 was substituted by the Eighteenth Amendment in 2010.

Between 1988 and 1996, Article 58(2)(b) was invoked four times to dismiss governments and dissolve the National Assembly. The most notable judicial challenge followed the 1993 dismissal of Prime Minister Nawaz Sharif, when the Supreme Court of Pakistan restored the Assembly in Nawaz Sharif v. President of Pakistan.

== Text ==
As inserted into Article 58 in 1985, paragraph (b) formed part of the President's power to dissolve the National Assembly. In substance, it authorized dissolution where the President, acting in his discretion, considered that constitutional government at the federal level could no longer be carried on and that a fresh appeal to the electorate had become necessary. After the clause was revived in 2002, the Seventeenth Amendment added a procedural safeguard by requiring the President to refer any dissolution under paragraph (b) to the Supreme Court within fifteen days; the Court was to decide the reference within thirty days, and its decision was declared final.

== Background ==
The Constitution of Pakistan as adopted in 1973 established a parliamentary system in which the prime minister and cabinet were responsible to the National Assembly. On 2 March 1985, however, the Revival of the Constitution Order introduced a broad set of constitutional changes under President Zia-ul-Haq. Later that year, Parliament adopted the Eighth Amendment, and the National Assembly's own historical summary describes Article 58(2)(b) as the significant addition through which the President acquired discretionary power to dissolve the Assembly.

The clause quickly became central to the balance of power between the presidency and the premiership. In April 1997, the Thirteenth Amendment omitted Article 58(2)(b). Its statement of objects and reasons said that the change was intended to strengthen parliamentary democracy and restore powers of the prime minister that had been taken away by the Eighth Amendment.

The provision reappeared under General Pervez Musharraf through the Legal Framework Order, 2002, which reinserted paragraph (b) into clause (2) of Article 58. The Seventeenth Amendment in 2003 validated the constitutional changes made through the Legal Framework Order and added a new clause (3) to Article 58, requiring a Supreme Court reference after any dissolution under paragraph (b).

The provision was finally removed in 2010. The National Assembly passed the Eighteenth Amendment on 8 April 2010, the Senate passed it on 15 April 2010, and it received presidential assent on 19 April 2010. The current official text of the Constitution records that Article 58 was substituted by section 17 of the Eighteenth Amendment.

== Invocations ==
Article 58(2)(b) was invoked against federal governments on the following occasions:

No.	President	Prime minister	Date	Outcome
1	Zia-ul-Haq	Muhammad Khan Junejo	29 May 1988	The National Assembly was dissolved and Junejo's government was dismissed.
2	Ghulam Ishaq Khan	Benazir Bhutto	6 August 1990	The National Assembly was dissolved and fresh general elections were held later in 1990.
3	Ghulam Ishaq Khan	Nawaz Sharif	18 April 1993	The National Assembly was dissolved, but the Supreme Court of Pakistan restored it on 26 May 1993 in Nawaz Sharif v. President of Pakistan.
4	Farooq Leghari	Benazir Bhutto	5 November 1996	The National Assembly was dissolved and Bhutto's government was dismissed.

Following the Supreme Court's restoration of the National Assembly in May 1993, the political crisis continued and the Assembly was later dissolved on the advice of Prime Minister Nawaz Sharif on 18 July 1993.

== Legacy ==
Article 58(2)(b) became one of the most controversial provisions in Pakistan's constitutional history because it gave the presidency a reserve power that could be used to terminate elected governments before the expiry of the National Assembly's normal five-year term. Debates over the clause shaped later constitutional reforms, especially the Thirteenth Amendment and the Eighteenth Amendment, both of which were presented as measures to restore or strengthen parliamentary government.

== See also ==
- Constitution of Pakistan
- Eighth Amendment to the Constitution of Pakistan
- Thirteenth Amendment to the Constitution of Pakistan
- Seventeenth Amendment to the Constitution of Pakistan
- Eighteenth Amendment to the Constitution of Pakistan
