= Constitution (Twenty-sixth Amendment) Act, 2017 =

Proposed legislation in Pakistan

The Constitution (Twenty-sixth Amendment) Act, 2017 was a proposed amendment to the Constitution of Pakistan aimed at restoration of delegation powers of the federal government to its officers or subordinate authorities which weren't included in the Eighteenth Amendment to the Constitution of Pakistan. The Constitution (Twenty-sixth Amendment) Act, 2017, introduced to the National Assembly of Pakistan sought to amend Articles 90, 99, and 139 of the Constitution.

It was never adopted and never officially became part of the constitution.
