= Federal Constitutional Court of Pakistan =

Supreme constitutional court of Pakistan

Federal Constitutional Court
- وفاقی آئینی عدالت
- Interactive map of Federal Constitutional Court
- 33°43′32″N 73°05′49″E
- Established: 13 November 2025; 2 months ago
- Jurisdiction: Constitutional and public law
- Location: Islamabad, Pakistan
- Coordinates: 33°43′32″N 73°05′49″E
- Composition method: Judicial Commission of Pakistan
- Authorised by: Constitution of Pakistan (Twenty-seventh Amendment)
- Appeals from: High Courts of Pakistan
- Judge term length: Compulsory retirement at 68 years of age
- Number of positions: Determined by Parliament of Pakistan
- Website: https://www.fccp.gov.pk/

Chief Justice
- Currently: Aminuddin Khan
- Since: 14 November 2025

The Federal Constitutional Court (abbr. FCC; Urdu: وفاقی آئینی عدالت, romanised: Wafāqī Āʾīnī ʿAdālat) is the constitutional court of the Islamic Republic of Pakistan at the federal level. It was established through the twenty-seventh amendment in the Pakistani constitution, passed by the Parliament of Pakistan in November 2025.

The court exercises exclusive jurisdiction in constitutional interpretation and disputes between the federal and provincial governments. Its creation transferred many of the constitutional functions previously exercised by the Supreme Court of Pakistan to a separate specialised body.

== Establishment ==
The Federal Constitutional Court of Pakistan was created through the Twenty-seventh Amendment to the Constitution of Pakistan, which was passed by Parliament in November 2025. The amendment restructured the higher judiciary, creating the FCCP as a permanent institution with powers to interpret the Constitution of Pakistan and adjudicate intergovernmental disputes. The amendment was introduced by Law Minister Azam Nazeer Tarar and approved by both houses of Parliament, before receiving the assent of President Asif Ali Zardari.

== Jurisdiction and powers ==
The FCC has exclusive authority to:

- Adjudicate disputes between the federal government and any provincial government, or among provinces.
- Interpret provisions of the Constitution of Pakistan and decide questions of constitutional law.
- Hear appeals involving substantial questions of constitutional interpretation arising from the High Courts.
- Exercise jurisdiction in cases involving enforcement of fundamental rights.

Any cases pending before other courts that fall within the FCCP's jurisdiction automatically stand transferred to it. The FCCP's decisions on constitutional interpretation are binding on all other courts, including the Supreme Court of Pakistan.

== Composition and appointments ==
The court is headed by the Chief Justice of the Federal Constitutional Court of Pakistan and composed of judges representing each of Pakistan's four provinces and the Islamabad Capital Territory. Judges retire at the age of 68, and the Chief Justice's term is limited to three years.

The first Chief Justice and the initial batch of judges of the FCC are appointed by the President of Pakistan on the advice of the Prime Minister. Subsequent appointments are made on the recommendation of the Judicial Commission of Pakistan (JCP) and confirmed by a Special Parliamentary Committee. The sanctioned strength of the court in total is 13 judges.

Justice Aminuddin Khan was appointed the inaugural Chief Justice by President Asif Ali Zardari on 14 November 2025.

=== Current bench ===
Order	Name	Appointment	Retirement	Federating unit	Notes
1	Aminuddin Khan	14 November 2025	13 November 2028	Punjab	1st Chief Justice
2	Hasan Azhar Rizvi	14 November 2025	1 February 2030	Sindh	
3	Aamer Farooq	14 November 2025	25 April 2037	Islamabad	
4	Ali Baqar Najafi	14 November 2025	14 September 2031	Punjab	
5	Rozi Khan Barrech	15 November 2025	6 April 2032	Balochistan	
6	KK Agha	17 November 2025	19 September 2032	Sindh	
7	Arshad Hussain Shah	17 November 2025	2032	Khyber Pakhtunkhwa	

== Relationship with the Supreme Court ==
The establishment of the FCCP reduced the Supreme Court of Pakistan's jurisdiction to that of an appellate court for non-constitutional matters. The Supreme Court continues to hear appeals in civil and criminal cases, while the FCCP exercises ultimate authority in constitutional interpretation and federal-provincial disputes.

== Criticism ==
The International Commission of Jurists (ICJ) described the amendment establishing FCC as a "flagrant attack on the independence of the judiciary" and warned that it would "significantly impair the judiciary's ability to hold the executive accountable". Senior judges, including Justice Mansoor Ali Shah of the Supreme Court of Pakistan, wrote in an open letter that the FCC represents a "political device to weaken and control the judiciary" rather than a genuine reform.

== See also ==
- Supreme Court of Pakistan
- Judiciary of Pakistan
- Judicial Commission of Pakistan
- Law of Pakistan
