= Eighth Amendment to the Constitution of Pakistan =

Amendment to the Pakistani constitution

The Eighth Amendment to the Constitution of Pakistan (Urdu: آئین پاکستان میں آٹھویں ترمیم) allowed the President to unilaterally dissolve the National Assembly and elected governments. The National Assembly of Pakistan amended the Constitution of Pakistan in 1985 and the law stayed on the books until its repeal in 1997.

The bill was passed in the absence of the elected Parliament. The eighth amendment was drafted and later enforced by the dictatorship of General Zia-ul-Haq. The eighth amendment changed Pakistan's system of government from a parliamentary democracy to a semi-presidential republic. The eighth amendment strengthened the authority of the President and also granted additional powers to dismiss the elected Prime Minister's government. These powers included the right, expressed in sub-section 2(b) inserted into Article 58, to dissolve the National Assembly (but not the Senate) if, in his or her opinion, "a situation has arisen in which the Government of the Federation cannot be carried on in accordance with the provisions of the Constitution and an appeal to the electorate is necessary." (Constitution of Pakistan, Article 58) with the consequence of dismissing the Prime Minister and his or her Cabinet.

== Text ==
The Eighth Amendment, besides making a number of other changes to the Constitution, introduced the following clause into Article 58 of the Constitution:

(2) Notwithstanding anything contained in clause (2) of Article 48, the President may also dissolve the National Assembly in his discretion where, in his opinion,

(a) a vote of no-confidence having been passed against the Prime Minister, no other member of the National Assembly is likely to command the confidence of the majority of the member’s of the National Assembly in accordance with the provisions of the Constitution, as ascertained in a session of the National Assembly summoned for the purpose; or
(b) a situation has arisen in which the Government of the Federation cannot be carried on in accordance with the provisions of the Constitution and an appeal to the electorate is necessary.

== Effect on democracy ==
General Zia-ul-Haq first used the amendment to dismiss Prime Minister Mohammad Khan Junejo for alleged corruption in May 1988. The prime minister had wanted to roll back Zia's authority. In 1988, Benazir Bhutto pledged to abolish the amendment in her election manifesto. The amendment stayed on the books however, because she did not have a sufficient number of seats in 1988 and again in 1993. From 1988 to 1996, President Ghulaam Ishaq Khan made extensive use of the eight amendment and the Article 58 2(b) to dissolve the National Assembly. President Khan used the amendment to dismiss the elected governments of Prime Ministers Benazir Bhutto and Nawaz Sharif. President Khan first used the VIII Amendment on August 6, 1990, against Bhutto on alleged cases of nepotism and the corruption. In 1993, President Ishaq Khan again used this amendment to dismiss the people-elected government of Prime Minister Nawaz Sharif. In the second instance, Prime Minister Nawaz Sharif was reinstated as prime minister by the Supreme Court, but the resulting stalemate ended with the resignations of both Khan and Sharif. The use of Article 58 2(b) was almost exclusively justified by the president as necessary, for the removal of corrupt governments that, it was asserted, had lost the confidence of the people. Elections were held each time that caused the ruling party to lose its majority or plurality in the National Assembly. It was again used in 1996 by President Farooq Ahmad Khan Leghari against his own party leader Prime Minister Benazir Bhutto in November 1996.

In 1997, the Thirteenth Amendment was passed, stripping the president of the power to dissolve the National Assembly and call for new elections, effectively reducing the presidency to a ceremonial figurehead.

The power of the president's office was partially restored by the Seventeenth Amendment. The power to dissolve the National Assembly and dismiss the Prime Minister was then subject to Supreme Court approval. In 2010, the Eighteenth Amendment was passed by Parliament of Pakistan, repealing the 17th Amendment.

== See also ==
- Zia-ul-Haq's Islamization
- Separation of powers
- Nawaz Sharif
- Pervez Musharraf
