= Twenty-eighth Amendment =

The Twenty-eighth Amendment may refer to:

- Twenty-eighth Amendment of the Constitution of India, 1972 amendment relating to conditions for the civil services of India
- Twenty-eighth Amendment of the Constitution of Ireland (2009), which permitted the state to ratify the Treaty of Lisbon.
- Twenty-eighth Amendment of the Constitution Bill 2008, an unsuccessful proposed amendment to the Constitution of Ireland, which would have permitted the state to ratify the Treaty of Lisbon.
- Constitution (Twenty-eighth Amendment) Act, 2017, an unsuccessful proposed amendment to the Constitution of Pakistan, which would have reauthorized the speedy trial military courts earlier established in accordance with the expired Twenty-first Amendment to the Constitution.
- List of proposed amendments to the Constitution of the United States, proposed amendments that would become the 28th Amendment if ratified
  - Equal Rights Amendment, referred to as the 28th Amendment by President Joe Biden, disputed
