= Twenty-seventh Amendment to the Constitution of Pakistan =

2025 amendment to the constitution of Pakistan

Constitution (Twenty-seventh Amendment) Act, 2025
- State emblem of Pakistan

Parliament of Pakistan
- Enacted by: Senate of Pakistan

Legislative history
- Bill title: The Constitution (27th Amendment) Bill, 2025
- Introduced by: Azam Nazir Tarar (Law Minister)
- Committee responsible: Special Parliamentary Committee, NA
- Committee of the whole: 13 November 2025
- Status: In force

The Twenty-seventh Amendment to the Constitution of Pakistan was passed on 13 November 2025. This package was introduced by the federal government under Prime Minister Shehbaz Sharif in late 2025, aimed at revising key articles governing judicial appointments, the defense command structure and federal-provincial relations. The bill, presented in the Senate by Law Minister Azam Nazir Tarar, created a new Federal Constitutional Court of Pakistan, changed the process of transferring judges, amended Article 243 of the 1973 Constitution of Pakistan relating to the control of the armed forces and reviewed the fiscal and administrative autonomy of the provinces. While the ruling coalition claimed that the reforms were necessary to modernise governance and strengthen national security, opposition parties and legal experts said that the amendment threatened provincial autonomy and judicial independence.

Business leaders cautioned that abrupt constitutional changes introduced without broad consultation could unsettle markets, erode investor confidence, and amplify uncertainty in an already fragile economic environment.

== Background ==
The 1973 Constitution of Pakistan has been amended several times to adjust the balance of powers between the federation and the provinces, redefine institutional roles, and respond to changing political and security realities. The 27th Amendment follows the 26th Amendment, which was passed in October 2024.

After gaining a parliamentary majority, the second Shehbaz Sharif government proposed the 27th Amendment to address a set of issues, i.e., judicial structure (including the formation of the Constitutional Court), federal–provincial relations, military command arrangements (particularly the revision of Article 243), and top appointments in the armed forces.

== Objectives and key proposals ==
According to official statements and media reporting, the key elements of the proposed amendments include:

- Abolition of the Supreme Court's role in hearing constitutional cases
- Establishment of a Federal Constitutional Court of Pakistan to hear constitutional questions, including inter-provincial and federal–provincial disputes
- Restructuring of the process of appointment, transfer and supervision of High Court judges, including giving the Judicial Commission of Pakistan a role in supervising the transfers of judges rather than direct executive discretion
- Raising the minimum threshold for provincial cabinets in smaller provinces from 11% to 13% of the strength of the assembly
- Amendments to Article 243 of the Constitution, which determines the federal government's control and command of the armed forces. The amendment proposes changes to the command structure of the military leadership – including abolishing the post of Chairman of the Joint Chiefs of Staff Committee (CJCSC) from 27 November 2025, and giving broader responsibilities to the Chief of the Army Staff, who will act as the Chief of Defence Forces
- Granting lifetime ranks, privileges and status to officials holding formal senior positions such as Field Marshal of the Army, Marshal of the Air Force, or Admiral of the Fleet
- Reviewing the distribution of federal revenue among provinces through the National Finance Commission (NFC) Award, and the possible transfer of certain subjects (education, population planning) from the provinces to the federation

== Legislative process ==
The federal cabinet approved the draft bill of the 27th Amendment on 8 November 2025. On the same day, the bill was presented in the Senate of Pakistan by Law Minister Azam Nazir Tarar and sent to the Senate and National Assembly Standing Committee on Law and Justice for joint consideration.

During the committee meeting, some lawmakers from the Jamiat Ulema-e-Islam (Fazl) (JUI-F) boycotted the proceedings, stating that some provisions had been revived that had already been scrapped during the discussion on the 26th Amendment. Law Minister Tarar stressed that discussions would continue until a consensus was reached.

Following the Senate presentation, the debate over the amendment reflected a longstanding governance challenge: balancing the federal government's drive for stronger central coordination in fiscal and security matters with public demands for transparency, provincial participation, and institutional legitimacy.

The National Assembly ratified the amendment on 12 November 2025.

The bill was again presented and passed by the Senate on 13 November 2025. It was signed into law by President Asif Ali Zardari later that day.

== Reactions ==
- The main opposition party, Pakistan Tehreek-e-Insaf (PTI), strongly opposes the amendment. It has called the move a strike at the very foundation of the constitutional structure and a "conspiracy against the Constitution".
  - Senator Syed Ali Zafar said the amendment weakens the judiciary and destroys the delicate balance of powers that the 1973 constitution had carefully crafted.
  - Secretary-General Salman Akram Raja called it "a ploy to enslave us ... to turn the judicial system into an instrument of oppression."
- The provincial government of Khyber Pakhtunkhwa (KP), also led by the PTI, expressed its strong disapproval: Chief Minister Sohail Afridi called the amendment a "blatant usurpation of powers" and a "robbery of provincial autonomy", warning that the federal government was undermining the division achieved under the 18th Amendment.
- The opposition alliance Tehreek-e-Tahafuz Aayin Pakistan (TTAP), including PTI, Pashtunkhwa Milli Awami Party (PkMAP), Balochistan National Party-Mengal (BNP-M) and others announced a nationwide protest campaign under slogans like "Long live democracy, down with dictatorship". They asserted that the move undermines the basic structure of the constitution.
- In a reaction to the passage of the amendment, two senior judges of the Supreme Court of Pakistan, namely Mansoor Ali Shah and Athar Minallah, submitted their resignations in a letter to President Asif Ali Zardari on 13 November 2025. The two judges framed their decisions in principle: Justice Shah called the amendment "a serious attack on the Constitution of Pakistan … it abolishes the Supreme Court … and subjects the judiciary to executive control," while Justice Minallah declared that "the Constitution that I swore to uphold … is no more" and that what remains is "a mere shadow".
- The International Commission of Jurists called it "a full-frontal assault on the rule of law" while citing that the appointment of judges would now fall under the executive body, not in line with international standards.
- Mahmood Khan Achakzai, chair of the opposition alliance Tehreek Tahafuz Ayeen-e-Pakistan, said Pakistan no longer had a constitution, an independent judiciary, or a functioning social contract, describing the amendment as an unforgivable crime against the nation and claiming it had effectively elevated one man to the position of a king above all.

== See also ==
- Amendments to the Constitution of Pakistan
- Judicial Commission of Pakistan
- Judiciary of Pakistan
- Law of Pakistan
- Constitution (Twenty-seventh Amendment) Act, 2017
- Constitution (Twenty-eighth Amendment) Act, 2017
