= Legal Framework Order =

Legal Framework Order refers to presidential decrees issued during military rule in Pakistan:

- Legal Framework Order, 1970, issued by Gen. Yahya Khan
- Legal Framework Order, 2002, issued by Gen. Pervez Musharraf.
