= Constitution (Twenty-eighth Amendment) Act, 2017 =

Proposed legislation in Pakistan

The Constitution (Twenty-eighth Amendment) Act, 2017 was an unsuccessful proposed amendment to the Constitution of Pakistan which aimed to reauthorize the speedy-trial military courts that had been established under the expired Twenty-first Amendment to the Constitution of Pakistan (which had a sunset clause and lapsed in January 2017).

It was never adopted and never officially became part of the constitution.

== See also ==
- Twenty-seventh Amendment to the Constitution of Pakistan
