= National Minorities Day =

- Official name: National Minorities Day
- Observed by: Pakistan
- Type: National
- Date: 11 August
- Frequency: annual

National Minorities Day is observed annually on 11 August in Pakistan. The origin of this observance dates back to 2009 when the Government of Pakistan established it with the aim of recognizing the contributions and dedications made by religious minority groups towards the nation's progress. To mark this day, a range of activities such as events, discussions, and communal assemblies are organized nationwide by different religious minority communities along with the involvement of the Ministry of Religious Affairs and Inter-faith Harmony.

== Background ==
The significance behind commemorating National Minorities Day is to underscore the principles advocated by the founder of the nation, Quaid-e-Azam Muhammad Ali Jinnah. He emphasized the concept of granting equal rights to every individual in Pakistan. In his address to the Constituent Assembly on 11 August 1947, Jinnah established the cornerstones of a contemporary, inclusive, and advancing Pakistan that would ensure equal rights for all citizens, irrespective of their beliefs or gender.

== Observance ==
During National Minorities Day, rallies take place throughout the nation to promote understanding of the rights of minority groups. Advocates arrange marches near Islamabad's National Press Club and Karachi's Frere Hall to express their concerns about perceived institutional bias against religious minorities. They also call for measures to address instances of coerced conversions and assaults on places of worship belonging to minority communities.

== See also ==
- Pakistan National Commission for Minorities
- Freedom of religion in Pakistan
- Secularism in Pakistan
