= KK Agha =

British Pakistani jurist and lawyer

Justice of the Sindh High Court
- In office 30 October 2015 – 14 November 2025

Additional Attorney General of Pakistan
- In office 2010–2011

Personal details
- Parent: Agha Fakhruddin Khan (Agha Nazir Ali Khan)

Muhammad Karim Khan Agha, commonly known as KK Agha, is a British Pakistani jurist and lawyer who served as a Justice of the Sindh High Court from 2015 to 14 November 2025. On 15 November 2025, he was appointed as a Justice of the newly constituted Federal Constitutional Court after the controversial 27th Amendment to the Constitution of 1973

Previously, he has served as the United Nations Prosecutor in the Netherlands and Africa and also as an advocate of the Supreme Court of Pakistan. He has also served as an Additional Attorney General, appointed by then Prime Minister of Pakistan, Yusuf Raza Gilani, between 2010 and 2011. Later, he was made the NAB Prosecutor General.

He is known for his affiliation to the Bhutto-Zardari family and was their lawyer when corruption cases were referenced against Benazir Bhutto and Asif Ali Zardari.

Agha holds a citizenship of the United Kingdom (UK). He holds properties in the UK for which a reference was filed against him by the Supreme Judicial Council.
