= 1962 Constitution of Pakistan =

Supreme law of Pakistan from 1962 to 1969

1962 Constitution of Pakistan ۱۹۶۲ آئینِ پاکستان (Urdu) পাকিস্তানের ১৯৬২ সালের সংবিধান (Bengali)
- State emblem of Pakistan (1954–1972)

Overview
- Jurisdiction: Pakistan
- Created: 17 February 1960 – 6 May 1961
- Presented: 6 May 1961 (draft submitted to President Ayub Khan)
- Ratified: 1 March 1962 (promulgated by President Ayub Khan)
- Date effective: 8 June 1962
- System: Federal presidential republic

Government structure
- Branches: Three (Executive, Legislature, and Judiciary)
- Head of state: President of Pakistan
- Chambers: One (National Assembly)
- Executive: Presidential executive, with the President serving as both head of state and head of government
- Judiciary: Supreme court, high courts, and district courts
- Federalism: Yes (two provinces, and later a federal territory from 1967) (Note: Azad Kashmir and six princely states (namely Amb, Chitral, Dir, Hunza, Nagar, and Swat) were not within the federation as they had the status of self-governing autonomous states, while Northern Areas (excluding Hunza and Nagar) was administered directly by the federal government.)
- Electoral college: Yes (Basic democracy for all elections)

History
- Repealed: 25 March 1969 (abrogated by President Yahya Khan through martial law)
- Amendments: 3
- Last amended: 15 June 1965
- Location: Ayub Hall, Rawalpindi
- Commissioned by: President Ayub Khan
- Authors: Constitutional Commission (headed by Muhammad Shahabuddin)
- Media type: Paperback
- Supersedes: 1956 Constitution of Pakistan
- Superseded by: 1973 Constitution of Pakistan

Full text
- Constitution of Pakistan of 1962 at Wikisource

The 1962 Constitution, also known as Ayub's Constitution or the Presidential Constitution, was the fundamental law of Pakistan from 8 March 1962 till 25 March 1969. Drafted under, and promulgated by, president and chief martial law administrator Ayub Khan, it was the country's second constitution since independence. It lasted over 7 years when it was abrogated by president and chief martial law administrator Yahya Khan. Consisting of 12 parts, 250 articles and 3 schedules, the federal constitution promulgated a strong presidential system, with the president possessing all executive authority and serving as both head of state and head of government.

== Background ==
Pakistan became an independent state in 1947. The first document that served as a constitution for Pakistan was the Government of India Act, 1935. The first Pakistani Constituent Assembly was elected in 1947 and after nine years adopted the first indigenous constitution, the short-lived Constitution of 1956. In October 1958, President Iskander Mirza abrogated the constitution. Shortly afterwards General Ayub Khan deposed Iskandar and declared himself president.

From 1958 to 1961, special commissions were established to study various aspects of national life, resulting in reforms across land tenure, the legal system, administration, and education. On 17 February 1960, Ayub Khan appointed a commission to report on the future constitutional framework for the country. The commission was headed by the former Chief Justice of Pakistan, Muhammad Shahabuddin, and had ten other members, five each from East Pakistan and West Pakistan, composed of retired judges, lawyers, industrialists and landlords. The report of the Constitution Commission was presented to President Ayub on 6 May 1961 (according to some writers report was presented on 29 April 1961) and thoroughly examined by the president and his Cabinet. A significant development was the creation of a uniform local government structure through a presidential order on October 27, 1959, which led to a referendum authorizing President Ayub to draft a new constitution.

In January 1962, the Cabinet finally approved the text of the new constitution. It was promulgated by President Ayub on 1 March 1962 and finally came into effect on 8 June 1962. The Constitution contained 250 articles divided into twelve parts and three schedules. With the enforcement of this Constitution after 44 months, martial law came to an end.

== Provisions ==
The constitution provided for a federal system with the principle of parity between East Pakistan and West Pakistan. Both provinces would run their separate provincial governments. The responsibilities and authority of the centre and the provinces were listed in the constitution. The central legislature had one house known as the National Assembly. There were 157 members of the National Assembly. The equality between the two wings was maintained in it.

The constitution provided for a presidential form of government, as opposed to the parliamentary form of government under the 1956 Constitution. The president, who had to be a Muslim not less than 35 years of age and qualified for election as a member of the National Assembly, was to be elected indirectly by an electoral college following the provisions outlined in the Constitution. The Electoral College was formed by not less than 80,000 Basic Democrats, equally distributed between the two provinces. Under the Constitution of 1962, if the number of candidates for election to the office of president exceeded three, the Speaker of the National Assembly was to convene a joint session of the members of the National and Provincial Assemblies to select only three candidates for election, the remaining candidates then would not be eligible. This screening did not apply to a person who was holding the office of the president, so if the sitting president was also a candidate the number of candidates would be four.

The term of the president was five years to act as head of state as well as chief executive, solely responsible for the country's administration. Governors and ministers were appointed and removed by him. He was eligible to promulgate ordinances and veto against legislated laws only overridable by two-thirds of the National Assembly. However, the president was not empowered to dissolve the Assembly except at the cost of his office also. On a charge of violating the Constitution or gross misconduct, the president might be impeached by the National Assembly for which one-third of the total members of the National Assembly must give written notice to the speaker for the removal of the president. The president was to be removed from office if the resolution for impeachment was passed by votes of not less than three-fourths of the total members of the Assembly. A significant feature of the impeachment procedure was that if the resolution for the removal of the president failed to obtain one-half of the total number of members of the National Assembly, the movers of the resolution would cease to be members of the Assembly.

There was no restriction on religion for a person holding the office of the speaker of the National Assembly. Also, if the president resigned from his office or vote of no-confidence passes against him, according to the Constitution, the speaker would act as the president of the state till the election of the new president. Under these special circumstances, a non-Muslim might get the chance to be an acting president of Pakistan.

The Constitution of 1962 provided for elections of the central and provincial legislatures for a term of five years. The members of the assemblies were elected by the Basic Democrats. The National Assembly was exclusively empowered to legislate for the central subjects. However, it could legislate on matters falling under provincial jurisdiction. The power to impose taxes was laid with the central legislature. The Assembly had to serve as a court in cases of impeachment or conviction or declare the president incapacitated. It could amend the Constitution with a two-thirds majority. However, if the president's veto was overridden, he had the right to ask for the assent of the Electoral College. The provincial assemblies' procedure was identical to that of the National Assembly.

Urdu and Bengali were recognised as national languages.

=== Salient features of 1962 Constitution ===
1. Federal System: Under the constitution of 1962 federal system was adopted. The powers of the central government were enumerated in the Federal List while all the residuary powers were given to the provinces to meet the demand of provincial autonomy. However, within this federal structure, the central government was made domineering even at the cost of provincial autonomy. Besides administrative matters, centralism was reflected. The provincial governors were the appointees of the president and were accountable to him: Hence the provincial executive was under the control of the centre. This centralism bore more disastrous results in respect of provincial autonomy. Consequently, the federal structure practically seemed unitary due to which the demand of provincial autonomy became more popular and widespread which threatened our solidarity in the later stage.

2. A Written and Detailed Document: The 1962 constitution was written in nature and character. It consisted of 250 Articles and 3 Schedules. Thus, it was a comparatively detailed document. Keeping in view the lack of democratic values and established norms it was thought expedient to give a detailed code of constitutional law as could regulate the conduct of different political institutions.

3. Islamic Provisions: Like the previous constitution of 1956, the Objective Resolution was included in the Constitution's Preamble. The teachings of the Quran and Islamiyat were to be made compulsory. The president was to be Muslim. Pakistan was declared an Islamic republic through the first amendment. No un-Islamic law would be enacted, and all the existing laws would be Islamized etc.

4. Position of the President: Under the Constitution of 1962 US-type presidential system was enforced to overcome political instability and establish a firm socio-economic and political order. All the executive authority was vested in the president, who was unanimously responsible for the business of the central government. All the ministers were appointed by him, and they were accountable to him alone. They could participate in the deliberations of the legislature, but they were not responsible for it. Along with the provincial governors, all the top-ranking officials were appointed by him. The president also enjoyed certain legislative, military and judicial powers. The provincial setup also followed the central structure. In short, it was the president who was all in all.

5. Unicameral Legislature: The 1962 Constitution like the previous constitution provided for a unicameral legislature called National Assembly. Its total strength was 156 (later 218 and then 313, who were elected by the electoral college of Basic Democrats. Besides, certain seats were also reserved for women. Its term was 5 years, which was fixed. The members were elected based on parity of representation between the East and West wings. The proceedings of the Assembly might not be challenged in any court of law. Unlike the previous practices, the members of the cabinet were not members of the legislature. The ministers could attend its meetings but like the US system, neither the president nor his cabinet colleagues were responsible.

6. Indirect Election: It was an innovation in the 1962 Constitution. It was a general impression that one of the causes of the failure of the constitutional machinery was the direct and adult suffrage and without proper and necessary political education and training. Hence this constitution provided an indirect method of election for President and the legislative assemblies was envisaged. Accordingly, the primary voters would elect the Basic Democrats who had then to elect the representatives to higher positions.

7. Independence of Judiciary: Proper safeguards were introduced in the 1962 Constitution to ensure the independence of the judiciary. Judges of the superior courts were appointed by the president and were ensured the security of service. They could be removed from the inquiry report submitted by the Supreme Judicial Council on the ground of misbehaviour or physical or mental inability to perform their duties. By induction of the first amendment, the judiciary had full, power to pass judgment over the views of the legislature. Moreover, the court also enjoyed the power of judicial review of executive actions.

8. Fundamental Rights add Principles of Policy: In the original constitution, there was no list of fundamental rights. It was due to the first amendment in the constitution in 1963 that these were included and made their part, before that these were laid down in the directive principles of policy. The list of fundamental rights contained almost all the rights secured to its citizens by a modern state. The Principles of Policy were also incorporated into the Constitution. Most of the Islamic provisions were made a part thereof. These principles of policy dealt with such matters as the Islamic way of life, national integration and solidarity, social welfare, protection of the rights of minorities, development of backward areas etc.

9. Provincial Governments: Each province had a provincial assembly organized on the lines of the National Assembly. The relationship of the provincial governors with their assemblies was the same as that of the president with the National Assembly. The East and West Pakistan assemblies used to meet at Dacca and Lahore respectively. Each had 155 members, at least of who were women. The governors appointed by the president, had a council of ministers in the same manner, as the president, who belonged to their respective provinces.

Although the 1962 constitution of Pakistan had transferred several responsibilities to the provincial governments but in actual practice the central government or its representatives used to exercise these powers.

=== Islamic provisions ===
- The preamble of the Constitution of 1962 was based on the Objectives Resolution.
- The Constitution laid down simply that the state of Pakistan shall be an Islamic republic under the name of the Republic of Pakistan.
- According to the principles of policy, steps were to be taken to enable the Muslims of Pakistan individually and collectively, to order their lives following the fundamental principles and basic concepts of Islam, and should be provided with facilities whereby they may be enabled to understand the meaning of life according to those principles and concepts.
- No law shall be enacted which is repugnant to the teachings and requirements of Islam as set out in the Qur'an and Sunnah and all existing laws shall be brought in conformity with the Qur'an and Sunnah.
- Only a Muslim could be qualified for the election as president.
- Teaching of the Quran and Islamiyah to the Muslims of Pakistan was made compulsory.
- Proper organization of Zakat, waqf, and mosques was ensured.
- Practical steps were to be taken to eradicate what was seen as social evils by Islam, such as the use of alcohol, gambling, etc.
- A novel Islamic provision in the 1962 Constitution had introduced an Advisory Council of Islamic Ideology to be appointed by the president. The functions of the council were to make recommendations to the government as to means which would enable and encourage the Muslims of Pakistan to order their lives by the principles and concepts of Islam and to examine all laws in force to bring them into conformity with the teachings and requirements of Islam as set out in the Qur'an and Sunnah.
- There shall be an organization to be known as Islamic Research Institute, which shall be established by the president. The institute's function was to undertake Islamic research and Instruction in Islam to assist in the reconstruction of Muslim society on a truly Islamic basis.
- The state should endeavour to strengthen the bonds of unity among Muslim countries.

== Demise ==
The second martial law was imposed on 25 March 1969 by General Agha Mohammad Yahya Khan, after General Ayub Khan handed over power to the army commander-in-chief, and not the speaker of National Assembly as laid down by the constitution. On assuming the presidency, General Yahya Khan acceded to popular demands by abolishing the one-unit system in West Pakistan on 1 July 1970 and ordered general elections on the principle of one man one vote. The first-ever general elections were held in December 1970, however, the government was not transferred to the Awami League Elections. This resulted in the destruction of national unity and eventually, the separation of East Pakistan was fought.

== Chronology of the Constitution ==
1959: The Basic Democracy (BD) was introduced through the Basic Democracy Order.

1960 February 17: General Ayub Khan appointed a constitution commission under the supervision of Shahabuddin.

1961 May 6 (some claim April 29): Constitutional Commission submitted its report to the president.

1962 June 8: Ayub Khan enforced the constitution.

1969 March 25: Constitution of 1962 was abrogated by General Yahya Khan.

== See also ==
- Secularism in Pakistan
- History of Pakistan
- Politics of Pakistan
- Constitution of Pakistan of 1956
- Constitution of Pakistan
- Political history of Pakistan
- Administrative units of Pakistan
- Government of East Pakistan
