= Fourteenth Amendment to the Constitution of Pakistan =

Pakistani constitutional amendment

The Fourteenth Amendment to the Constitution of Pakistan (Urdu: آئین پاکستان میں چودہویں ترمیم) was an amendment to the Constitution of Pakistan passed in 1997, during the government of Prime Minister Nawaz Sharif, leader of the Pakistan Muslim League party. It subjected Members of Parliament to very strict party discipline. Party leaders received unlimited power to dismiss any of their legislators from Parliament if they spoke or voted against their party. The fourteenth amendment to the constitution of Pakistan was to prevent the switching of parties to form a strong coalition government or to become a strong opposition.

Since Nawaz' party had an overwhelming majority in Parliament, the Fourteenth Amendment effectively prevented the Prime Minister from being dismissed by a no confidence vote. A few months earlier, the Thirteenth Amendment took away the President's reserve power to remove a Prime Minister by dissolving Parliament and calling new elections. The amendments removed nearly all checks and balances on the Prime Minister's power, since there was virtually no way he could be legally dismissed.

In Pakistan, once legislators are elected to national or provincial assemblies, there is no way for the people to recall them before the end of their five-year terms. In the past, this has contributed to a sense of immunity on the part of members of the ruling party, and to rampant corruption among leading politicians. The Fourteenth Amendment increased this perception, and contributed to the overwhelming popular support for General Pervez Musharraf's coup in 1999. The Supreme Court subsequently validated the coup on the grounds that the Thirteenth and Fourteenth amendments created a situation for which there was no constitutional remedy.
