= Inheritance law in Pakistan =

Pakistani law of succession

Inheritance law in Pakistan govern how property is passed on after death. Article 23 of the 1973 Constitution of Pakistan guarantees all citizens the right to own property. Women have often faced challenges to asserting these rights. To address this, the government has introduced initiatives aimed to educating and assisting women with inheritance matters.

== Inheritance law ==
Inheritance is the right of an heir to succeed to property on the death of an ancestor or something that may legally be transmitted to an heir according to William James Stewart. "According to the research carried out by the National Commission on the Status of Women under United Nations Development Programme (UNDP) revealed that the concept of inheritance was evolved centuries ago as a deviation from the custom of burying wealth, widows, and slaves along with the deceased and continued to persist strictly under the patriarchal domain."

Article 23 of the 1973 Constitution of Pakistan states: "Every citizen shall have the right to acquire, hold and dispose of property in any part of Pakistan, subject to the Constitution and any reasonable restrictions imposed by law in the public interest". Pakistan being an Islamic country tends to follow Islamic Inheritance Jurisprudence particularly with regards to the matters of inheritance.

According to Sharia, the legal heirs that are blood relations have a right to inherit from the property of the ancestor or a relative after their death. Chapter four of the Quran, called Surah An-Nisa, narrates the appropriate method that must be followed to determine the share in inheritance.

The practice of acquiring property rights for women in Pakistan is however not effortless despite the constitutional law claiming otherwise.

== Prevention of denial of inheritance rights to women ==
The West Pakistan Muslim Personal Law also known as Shariat Act 1962 and Muslim Family Law Ordinance of 1961, protect the rights of legal heirs.

According to the Section 498-A of the Prevention of Anti-Women Practices Act of 2011 (Criminal Law Amendment), depriving women of inheriting property by deceitful or illegal means shall be punished with imprisonment which may extend to a time period of ten years but not less than five years. The convicted person may be fined of one million rupees and imprisoned at the same time.

Pakistan has also ratified several international conventions promoting gender equality such as the Convention on the Elimination of all Forms of Discrimination Against Women CEDAW and International Labor Organization ILO core convention 100 on equal remuneration for women.

While the Islamic and municipal law promise equal rights to women, the societal practice makes no such guarantee. A survey conducted in January 2017 and released in a press release by the non-governmental organisation AGHS Legal Aid Cell, 80 percent of women reported not getting their legal share in inheritance.

The denial and inaccessibility of property share to women is highest in Balochistan, as restriction on selection of profession is 66 percent, selection of spouse 77.1 percent, freedom of traveling 66.13 percent, problem in keeping contacts with others 64.97 percent and the denial of the right to inheritance is 100 percent. In Balochistan, no inheritance for women exist where especially male offspring are part of the family. There have also been incidents of male relatives using force or resorting to murder, when their female relatives approach a court of law to claim their share in inheritance or refuse to give up their legal rights. Courts in Pakistan have been upholding the rights of women to inherit property; however, very few cases are actually brought to the notice of courts.

=== Noor Jahan: an exceptional case ===
In 2016, the Supreme Court ruled in the favor of Noor Jahan by allowing her the rightful share from the property of her deceased father, which was contested by Jahan's brothers. The decision was however reached long after the death of Jahan.

The case had been dragging on for about a quarter of a century, was finally laid to rest by a two-member bench, consisting of Justice Ejaz Afzal Khan and Justice Qazi Faez Isa. In its final order, the bench observed, "A sister, to claim her rightful inheritance, was compelled to go to court and suffered long years of agony. However, before [she] could get what was rightfully hers, she too departed from this world... A quarter of a century has elapsed since the death of Haji Sahraney (the deceased father). Such a state of affairs, to say the least, is most unfortunate."

The family dispute had started between the brothers and their only sister right after the death of their father around 1990–91. "The deceased owned a house [and] four shops," in addition to agricultural lands in Swat, which were supposedly gifted by the late father to his three sons, Islamuddin, Rehmanuddin and Shahabuddin, on June 26, 1989.

== Government initiatives ==
In September 2018, the Ministry of Human Rights of Pakistan launched an awareness campaign to educate citizens on women's rights to inheritance as outlined by Islamic jurisprudence and the Constitution. The awareness campaign placed significant emphasis on Article 23 of the 1973 Constitution which states that every citizen has equal right to acquire property regardless of gender discrimination. The ministry aimed to educate people about the religious and legal protection provided to women in the country via this drive.

"When amendments were made to inheritance laws in 2012 and 2015, we conducted a study in 2016 to gauge the impact. Our findings revealed that the amendments made a difference," said Fauzia Viqar, Status of Women (PCSW) Chairperson. "There is no time limit. A woman can file an inherited property claim at any age," she reiterated. Viqar agreed that once the case goes to court, it can become a time taking process to settle the legal disputes. It is mandatory to speed up the judicial process by increasing the number of judges assigned and available for all cases. However, this does not mean that a woman should forfeit her legal right, Viqar maintained. Commenting on the effectiveness of such campaigns, Viqar says that drives like these help in creating awareness.

Since the government launched this campaign, PCSW is said to have received countless calls about inheritance rights, she quoted. "Most women ask two questions; what are my rights and how can I claim them." Consequently, Viqar took up the initiative to set up a helpline for protecting and promoting women's inheritance rights in the province.

PCSW Senior Legal Adviser Imran Javed Qureshi mentioned that the commission received most of the calls from areas where there is a higher literacy rate among women. Lahore topped the list next to Rawalpindi followed by Faisalabad. "We also receive calls from far-flung areas such as Rajanpur, Layyah and Bhakkar," he adds. "Women can ring up the helpline and share their cases with legal advisors deputed round-the-clock from the comfort of their home," he maintains. After the person informs us of the intricacies of the case and files a complaint, we register it and send the information to the concerned authorities, he adds. "The helpline works as a bridge between the women and official authorities," he says.

President Dr Arif Alvi in December 2018, quoted: "There cannot be women empowerment without economic independence and giving them their due right to inheritance". "By giving women their rightful share in inheritance according to the injunctions of Islam, we can make them economically independent and that will be vital step towards their empowerment," he said while talking to a delegation of Khyber Pakhtunkhwa Commission on the Status of Women led by its chairperson Neelum Toru.

The government is intervening by having proposed law amendments and suggesting methods to curb the inheritance challenge faced by women, but the statistics showing women who actually inherited from ancestral property remains low.

== Bibliography ==
- Rasool, Abdul; et al. (2021). "Hurdles to Women's Inheritance Rights Among Various Societies of Pakistan (A Sociological Investigation)". European Journal of Agricultural and Rural Education. 2 (4): 33–38.
