= Ali Baqar Najafi =

Pakistani jurist

Justice Justice Ali Baqar Najafi
- علی باقر نجفی

Judge of the Federal Constitutional Court of Pakistan
- Incumbent
- Assumed office 14 November 2025

Judge of the Supreme Court of Pakistan
- In office 16 April 2025 – 14 November 2025

Judge of the Lahore High Court
- In office 16 April 2012 – 16 April 2025

Personal details
- Occupation: Jurist

Justice Ali Baqar Najafi (Urdu: علی باقر نجفی) is a Pakistani jurist currently serving as a Judge of the Federal Constitutional Court of Pakistan since 14 November 2025. He previously served as a judge of the Supreme Court of Pakistan (2025) and a Judge of the Lahore High Court (2012–2025). Prior to joining the judiciary, he practiced law for over two decades and taught at the Punjab University Law College.

== Early life and education ==
Justice Ali Baqar Najafi obtained his early education in Lahore. He completed his LL.B. from the Punjab University Law College (University of the Punjab). He later joined the Faculty of Law at Punjab University Law College as a lecturer.

== Legal career (1989–2012) ==
Justice Najafi began his legal practice in 1989. He practiced before the trial courts, High Courts and Supreme Court of Pakistan, specialising in:

- criminal law
- civil litigation
- constitutional matters
- service and administrative disputes
- family and taxation law

== Judicial career ==
=== Federal Constitutional Court of Pakistan (14 November 2025–present) ===
Justice Najafi took oath as a Judge of the Federal Constitutional Court on 14 November 2025, shortly after the Court’s establishment under 27th constitutional amendment.

=== Supreme Court of Pakistan (16 April 2025 - 14 November 2025) ===
Justice Najafi was elevated to the Supreme Court of Pakistan on 16 April 2025 and served until 14 November 2025. His tenure included work on criminal law, fundamental rights, and administrative law matters.

=== Lahore High Court (2012–2025) ===
Justice Najafi was elevated as a Judge of the Lahore High Court on 16 April 2012. During his thirteen-year tenure, he delivered numerous reported judgments across constitutional, criminal, civil, family, taxation, service, environmental, and international law.

He became widely known for authoring the Model Town Inquiry Report (2014). He also supported:

- digitisation of judicial processes
- jail reforms
- juvenile justice reforms

== Jurisprudence and contributions ==
Justice Najafi has authored significant and influential judgments in:

- constitutional interpretation
- criminal justice and procedure
- civil and commercial law
- family and guardianship matters
- environmental law
- service and administrative regulation
- taxation law
- juvenile justice
- international law

== International representation ==
Justice Najafi has represented Pakistan at various international legal conferences, including events held in Rio de Janeiro and Washington.

== See also ==
- Federal Constitutional Court of Pakistan
- Supreme Court of Pakistan
- Lahore High Court
- Judiciary of Pakistan
