= Prime Minister of Pakistan =

Head of government

- وزِیرِ اعظم پاکستان
- State Emblem of Pakistan

- Prime ministerial standard

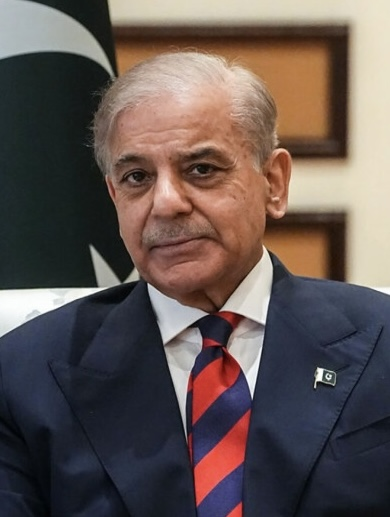
- Incumbent; Shehbaz Sharif since 4 March 2024
- Executive branch of the Government of Pakistan
- Style: The Honourable; Mr. Prime Minister (informal); His Excellency (diplomatic)
- Type: Head of government
- Status: Leader of the House
- Abbreviation: PM
- Member of: Cabinet National Assembly Common Interests Council
- Reports to: President of Pakistan; Parliament of Pakistan
- Residence: Prime Minister House
- Seat: Islamabad
- Nominator: National Assembly of Pakistan
- Appointer: President of Pakistan
- Term length: At the pleasure of the president subject to Article 91(7) of the Constitution.
- Constituting instrument: Constitution of Pakistan
- Inaugural holder: Liaquat Ali Khan (1947–1951)
- Formation: 14 August 1947; 79 years ago
- Deputy: Deputy Prime Minister of Pakistan
- Salary: PKR 2,412,000, annual (Note: The salary of Prime Minister of Pakistan is 2 Lakhs 1 thousand per month (9,50,574/month equivalent US$1,323) inclusive of all allowances and exclusive of the taxes, He is not receiving any payment from government. The salaries of federal ministers, state ministers, senators, high court judges, and president is more than the prime minister of Pakistan.)
- Website: pmo.gov.pk

The prime minister of Pakistan (Note: Urdu: وزِیرِ اعظم پاکستان, romanized: Wazīr-e-Aʿẓam, lit. 'Grand Vizier', Urdu pronunciation: [ʋəˈziːr-ˌeː ˈɑː.zəm]) is the head of government of the Islamic Republic of Pakistan. Executive authority is vested in the prime minister-led and appointed cabinet, with the president of Pakistan serving as the nominal head of executive and state. The prime minister is often the leader of the party or the coalition with a majority in the lower house of the federal parliament, the National Assembly, where he serves as leader of the House. Prime minister holds office by virtue of their ability to command the confidence of the National Assembly. The prime minister is designated as the "chief executive of the Islamic Republic". Despite the prime minister's authority as the head of government, due to the influence of the military, the chief of the army staff is seen as the de facto most powerful office in the country, above the Prime Minister. (Note: Sources:)

Pakistan's prime minister leads the executive branch of the federal government, oversees the state economy, leads the National Assembly, heads the Council of Common Interests as well as the Cabinet, and is charged with leading the National Command Authority over Pakistan's nuclear weapons arsenal. This position places its holder in leadership of the nation and in control over all matters, both internal affairs and foreign policy. The prime minister is elected by the members of the National Assembly and is therefore usually the leader of the majority party in the parliament. The Constitution of Pakistan vests executive powers in the prime minister, who is responsible for appointing the Cabinet as well as running the executive branch, taking and authorizing executive decisions, appointments, and recommendations that require prime ministerial confirmation.

Constitutionally, the prime minister serves as the chief adviser to the president of Pakistan on critical matters; and plays an influential role in appointment in each branch of the military leadership as well as ensuring civilian control of the military through chairman joint chiefs, although this does not necessarily happen in tandem. Prime ministerial powers have significantly grown with a delicate system of check and balance by each branch. The position was absent during the years of 1958–1973, 1977–1985, and 1999–2002 due to imposed martial law. In each of these periods, the military junta led by the president had the powers of the prime minister. As of 2025, no prime minister of Pakistan has completed a full five-year term in office.

== History ==
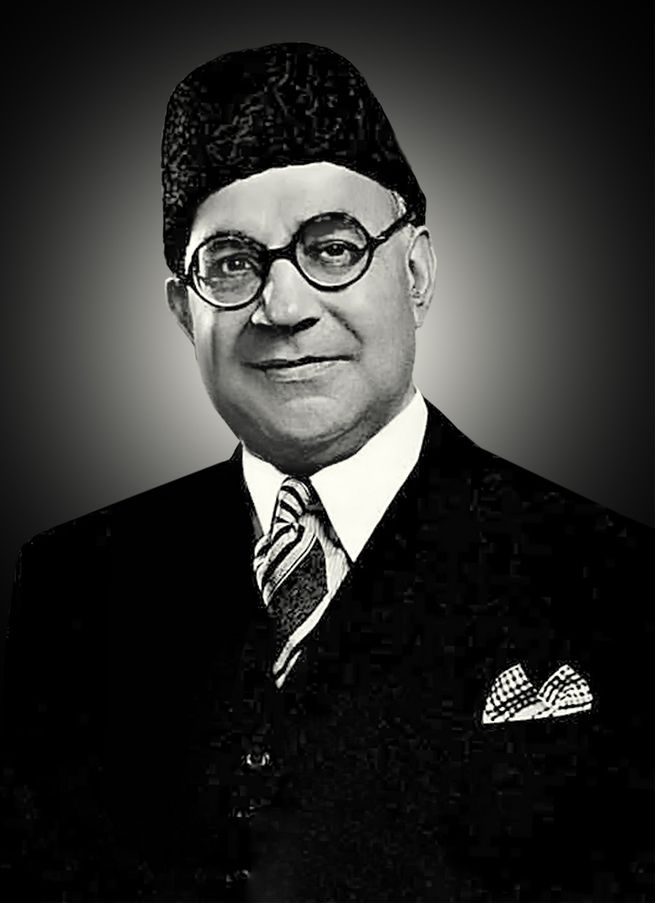
Liaquat Ali Khan, served as the first prime minister of Pakistan after independence (1947–1951).

The office of the prime minister was created on immediate effect after the partition and the establishment of Pakistan in 1947; the prime minister existed alongside the governor-general who was the representative of the British monarchy. The first prime minister, Liaquat Ali Khan, exercised central executive powers until his assassination in 1951. The powers slowly began to be reduced as a result of constant intervention by the governor-general. Despite the first set of the Constitution giving central power in 1956, the next six prime ministers were dismissed by the governor-general from 1951 till 1957. The first set of the Constitution had evolved the governor-general into the president of Pakistan whilst declaring the country an "Islamic republic". In 1958, President Iskandar Mirza dismissed the seventh prime minister to impose martial law in a mere two weeks, President Mirza was ousted by army chief General Ayub Khan who had for a brief period held the post of prime minister.

In 1962, the second set of the Constitution completely dissolved the office of prime minister as all powers were transferred to the president of Pakistan. Criticism over the presidency after the presidential election held in 1965 over the centralizing of powers. After the general elections held in 1970, the office was established with Nurul Amin becoming the prime minister who was also the vice-president. Negotiations that fall apart between Zulfikar Ali Bhutto, Mujibur Rehman, and Yahya Khan that prompted to liberation movement in the East Pakistan. With India intervening in East Pakistan and Pakistan conceding defeat to end the war led to the collapse of the presidential system in 1971.

As the comprehensive Constitution reinstated in 1973, the post was reestablished with more central powers as the constitution provided a parliamentary system with President of Pakistan as figurehead. Amid agitation instigated by the right-wing alliance invited the military intervention in 1977 which suspended the post.

The general elections held in 1985 restored the post, with Muhammad Junejo becoming the prime minister. Later that year, the National Assembly passed the controversial eighth amendment to the Constitution, giving the president the power to dismiss the prime minister and the National Assembly without prior consultation. The general elections in 1988 resulted in the Pakistan Peoples Party's Benazir Bhutto becoming the first woman prime minister elected in a Muslim country.

From 1988 to 1993, the power struggle between the prime minister and presidency continued with the president dismissing the National Assembly on three different occasions. At the 1997 elections, the PML(N) secured a two-thirds majority in the Parliament and drafted the XIII and XIV Amendments to reverse the eighth amendment to the Constitution; this allowed Nawaz Sharif to centralize more executive powers. After the draw down of civil-military relations in 1999, Chairman joint chiefs General Pervez Musharraf staged a coup d'état against the PML(N)'s government and held nationwide elections in 2002.

With no party gaining a majority, a coalition was formed with the PML(Q) – a breakaway of the PML(N) and a pro-Musharraf party – leading with MQM. After some political wrangling, Zafarullah Jamali became the prime minister, and passed the XVII amendment which partially restored the power of the president to dissolve the National Assembly, but made the dissolution subject to the Supreme Court of Pakistan's approval.

Over the authority issues, Prime Minister Jamali resigned in 2004 and Shaukat Aziz was eventually appointed as prime minister, securing 151 out of 191 votes in the National Assembly. The XVII amendment featured a semi-presidential system allowing the presidency to keep the interference executive and the judiciary. The general elections in 2008 resulted in the PPP coming to power and supporting the movement to oust Pervez Musharraf. A populist intellectual movement leading to the departure of Pervez Musharraf allowed Asif Zardari to become president. In 2010, the XVIII Amendment to the Constitution of Pakistan was passed to reverse the XVII amendment; it returned the country to being a parliamentary democratic republic. The XVIII Amendment removed all powers of the presidency to dissolve the Parliament unilaterally and sweep away the powers amassed by the former presidents Pervez Musharraf and Zia-ul-Haq to maintain a delicate check and balance.

Following a contempt of court case, the Supreme Court permanently disqualified Prime Minister Yousuf Raza Gillani. Originally, the PPP nomination was Makhdoom Shahbuddin, but he was forced to withdraw after the ANF issued non-bailable arrest warrants against him. Raja Pervaiz Ashraf became the prime minister and remained in office until 2013. The general election held in 2013 saw the PML(N) almost achieve a supermajority. Following this, Nawaz Sharif was elected as prime minister, returning to the post for the third time after a fourteen-year absence, in a democratic transition. In July 2017, Nawaz Sharif was disqualified as prime minister, not on the corruption charges linked to Panama papers leak that he was questioned for in extension due to his sons, but for failing to declare as in his nomination papers, salary from a company owned by his son. His lawyer insisted that though the ousted prime minister was designated chairman of the company, he had never drawn any salary from the company, however, the judges consulting Black's Law Dictionary chose to disqualify Nawaz Sharif for not paying taxes on an asset he never held but could have.

On 18 August 2018, Imran Khan was sworn in as the country's 22nd prime minister. On 10 April 2022, a constitutional crisis culminated in Khan losing a motion of no confidence with 174 votes cast against him, ending his premiership and making him the first prime minister of Pakistan to be legitimately removed from office, through a motion of no confidence.

On 11 April 2022, Shehbaz Sharif was elected as the country's 23rd Prime Minister. He won by majority 174 votes in the National Assembly of Pakistan. Sharif served two years to fulfill Imran Khan's term until the 2024 Pakistani General Election. The elections were originally meant to be conducted in 2023 but were delayed due a pertaining legal issue between PTI and Election Commission of Pakistan.

On 3 March 2024, Shehbaz Sharif was re-elected for the second time as the country's 24th Prime Minister. He won by majority in the National Assembly of Pakistan against Omar Ayub Khan in a disputed elections.

== Constitutional law ==
The Constitution envisages a scheme of affairs in which the president of Pakistan is the head of state who represents the "unity of the Republic." The system of government in Pakistan is based on codified constitution which sees the prime minister as "chief executive of the Republic".

Subject to the Constitution the Federation shall be exercised in the name of the President by the Federal Government, consisting of the Prime Minister and the Federal Ministers, which shall act through the Prime Minister, who shall be the chief executive of the Federation."

— Article 90(1) in Chapter 3: The Federal Government of Part III: The Federation of Pakistan in the Constitution of Pakistan, source

The prime minister is also the chairman of the Council of Common Interests as set by:

1 There shall be a Council of Common Interests, in this Chapter referred to as the Council, to be appointed by the President

(2) The Council shall consist of-
(a) the Prime Minister who shall be the Chairman of the Council;
(b) the Chief Ministers of the Provinces;

(c) three members from the Federal Government to be nominated by the Prime Minister from time to time.

— Article 153 in Chapter 3: Special Provisions of Part V: Relations between Federation and Provinces in the Constitution of Pakistan, source

As in most of the parliamentary democracies, a head of state's duties are mostly ceremonial. The prime minister of Pakistan is the head of government and has the responsibility for executive power. With Pakistan following a parliamentary system of government, the Prime minister is generally the leader of a party (or coalition of parties) that has a majority in the National Assembly —the lower house of the Parliament of Pakistan. The prime minister, in common with all other ministers, has to be a member of National Assembly.

=== Role and powers ===
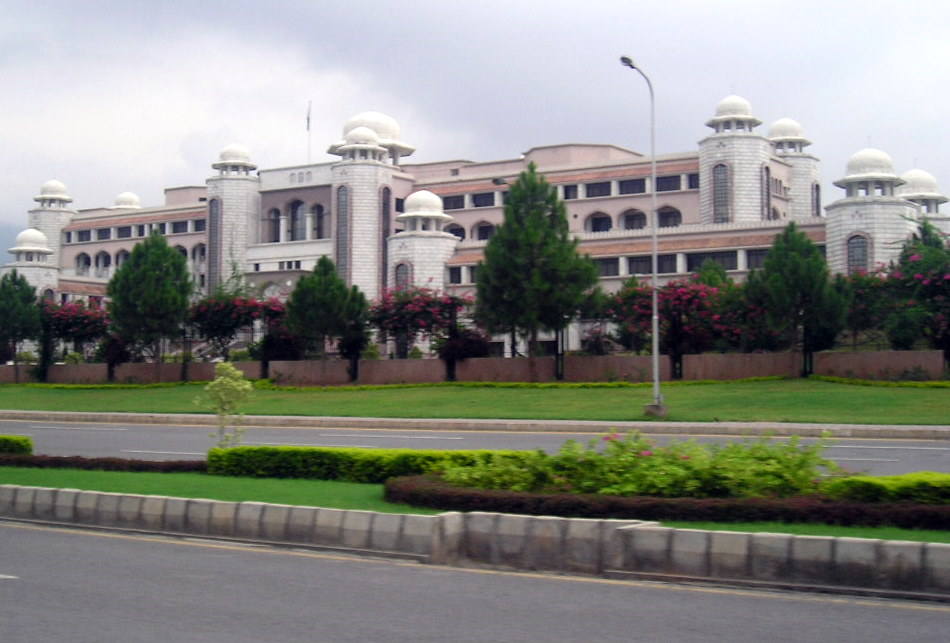
Prime Minister's Office in Islamabad, the principal workplace of the prime minister.

The principal workplace of the prime minister is the Prime Minister's Office located in northeast Islamabad. The official residence, known as Prime Minister Enclave, is near the Prime Minister's Office. The prime minister is the chief executive who heads and exercises the authority of the Government of Pakistan. After obtaining a vote of confidence, the prime minister is invited by the president to take the oath of office and form the government. In practice, the prime minister nominates the members of the Cabinet who supervise the important functions and ministries of the Government of Pakistan and communicates to the president all decisions of the Cabinet relating to the administration of affairs of state and proposals for legislation.

The prime minister, in consultation with the Cabinet, schedules and attends the sessions of the Parliament and is required to answer questions from members of parliament to the ministers. The prime minister makes appointments on various important positions, including:

- The federal secretaries as head of cabinet-level ministries
- The chief secretaries of the provinces
- Key administrative and military personnel in the Pakistan Armed Forces
- The chairmen of large public sector organisations and corporations such as NHA, PIA, PNSC etc.
- The chairmen and other members of the federal commissions and public institutions
- Ambassadors and High Commissioners to other countries

Some specific ministries are usually allocated to the prime minister:

- Planning Commission
- National Command Authority
- National Security Council
- Economic Coordination Committee
- Cabinet Committee on National Security

The prime minister is vested with command authority over the Pakistani nuclear arsenal and represents the country in various delegations, high-level meetings, and international organisations that require the attendance of the highest government office and also addresses the nation on various issues of national importance.

=== Eligibility ===
The Constitution of Pakistan requires that the prime minister be a member of the National Assembly. As well as this, one must:

- be a citizen of Pakistan.
- be a Muslim
- be above 25 years of age
- be able to prove good conduct of character and be not commonly known to violate Islamic injunctions
- have adequate knowledge of Islamic teachings and practice obligatory duties prescribed by Islam, as well as abstaining from major sins
- have not, after the establishment of Pakistan, worked against the integrity of the country or opposed the ideology of Pakistan.

=== Selection and removal ===
The candidates for the prime minister are members of the National Assembly who were chosen through direct elections by popular vote following campaigning on the party platforms. Usually, the leader of the majority party in the parliament retains the office of prime minister, and forms the government either by coalition or by simple majority. The candidate must retain the vote of confidence of the members of the parliament before being invited by the president to form the government.

The prime minister can be removed before the expiry of the term through a vote of no confidence in the parliament. If the vote of no confidence is passed by the National Assembly by a simple majority, the prime minister ceases to retain the office. In the past, prime ministers (and their governments) have been dismissed by the president exercising the VIII Amendment to the Constitution of Pakistan (1985), but this was repealed by the XVIII Amendment to the Constitution of Pakistan (2010). The prime minister has absolute constitutional immunity from criminal and civil proceedings, and no proceedings can be initiated or continued against him during the term of his office.

In 2012, the Supreme Court of Pakistan has ceased at least one prime minister from retaining the office due to contempt of court after retroactively disqualifying the membership of the parliament permanently.

On 28 July 2017, the Supreme Court of Pakistan disqualified the prime minister Nawaz Sharif from retaining the office due to his failure in fulfilling the eligibility requirements as enshrined in Articles 62 of the Constitution. This was in the aftermath of the Supreme Court hearing regarding the Panama Papers Case. This also resulted in him being permanently disqualified from membership of the parliament.

The prime minister is elected by the National Assembly. The National Assembly meets on the twenty-first day after a general election (at least every five years) unless the president calls for a vote of no confidence. Whichever member of the National assembly is chosen serves as the prime minister until the next election or until he fails to maintain the confidence of the National Assembly.

91. The Cabinet:

(1) There shall be a Cabinet of Ministers, with the Prime Minister at its head, to aid and advise the President in the exercise of his functions.

(2) The National Assembly shall meet on the twenty-first day following the day on which a general election to the Assembly is held unless sooner summoned by the President.

(3) After the election of the Speaker and the Deputy Speaker, the National Assembly shall, to the exclusion of any other business, proceed to elect without debate one of its Muslim members to be the Prime Minister.

(4) The Prime Minister shall be elected by the votes of the majority of the total membership of the National Assembly:

Provided that, if no member secures such majority in the first poll, a second poll shall be held between the members who secure the two highest numbers of votes in the first poll and the member who secures a majority of votes of the members present and voting shall be declared to have been elected as Prime Minister:

Provided further that, if the number of votes secured by two or more members securing the highest number of votes is equal, further poll shall be held between them until one of them secures a majority of votes of the members present and voting.

(5) The member elected under clause (4) shall be called upon by the President to assume the office of Prime Minister and he shall, before entering upon the office, make before the President oath in the form set out in the Third Schedule:

Provided that there shall be no restriction on the number of terms for the office of the Prime Minister.

=== Oath of office ===
The prime minister is required to make and subscribe to, in the presence of the president, an oath or affirmation that they shall protect, preserve and defend the Constitution as follows:

I, ____________, do swear solemnly that l am a Muslim and believe in the Unity and Oneness of Almighty Allah, the Books of Allah, the Holy Qura'an being the last of them, the Prophethood of Muhammad (peace be upon him) as the last of the Prophets and that there can be no Prophet after him, the Day of Judgment, and all the requirements and teachings of the Holy Quran and Sunnah:

That I will bear true faith and allegiance to Pakistan:

That, as Prime Minister of Pakistan, I will discharge my duties, and perform my functions, honestly, to the best of my ability, faithfully in accordance with the Constitution of the Islamic Republic of Pakistan and the law, and always in the interest of the sovereignty, integrity, solidarity, well- being and prosperity of Pakistan:

That I will strive to preserve the Islamic Ideology which is the basis for the creation of Pakistan:

That I will not allow my personal interest to influence my official conduct or my official decisions:

That I will preserve, protect and defend the Constitution of the Islamic Republic of Pakistan:

That, in all circumstances, I will do right to all manner of people, according to law, without fear or favor, affection or ill- will:

And that I will not directly or indirectly communicate or reveal to any person any matter which shall be brought under my consideration or shall become known to me as Prime Minister except as may be required for the due discharge of my duties as Prime Minister.

May Allah Almighty help and guide me (A'meen).

== See also ==
- Principal Secretary to the Prime Minister of Pakistan
- Air transports of heads of state and government
- Federal Secretary
- Grade 22
- Deputy Prime Minister of Pakistan
- List of prime ministers of Pakistan
- Prime Minister of Pakistan House
