= Constitution (Twenty-seventh Amendment) Act, 2017 =

Proposed legislation in Pakistan

The Constitution (Twenty-seventh Amendment) Act, 2017, was an unsuccessful proposed amendment to the Constitution of Pakistan, which aimed to implement changes recommended by the Parliamentary Committee on Electoral Reforms.

It was never adopted and never became part of the constitution.

== See also ==
- Twenty-seventh Amendment to the Constitution of Pakistan
