= Legal Framework Order, 2002 =

Constitutional restoration in Pakistan

The Legal Framework Order, 2002 was issued by Pakistani president Pervez Musharraf in August 2002. It provided for the general elections of 2002 and the revival of the 1973 Constitution of Pakistan, and added numerous amendments to the Constitution. The following month, the Supreme Court overruled Musharraf, ruling that the amendments would have to be ratified by Parliament in the manner provided in the unamended 1973 Constitution—the amendments would have to be approved by two-thirds of both houses of the bicameral body.

After the October 2002 general elections, although Musharraf's supporters had a majority in Parliament, they did not have the required two-thirds supermajority to ratify the Legal Framework Order. Parliament remained effectively deadlocked for over a year due to strong opposition from Musharraf's critics. In December 2003, a faction was persuaded to vote for a compromise amendment bill, the Seventeenth Amendment to the Constitution of Pakistan. With this amendment, parts of the Legal Framework Order were incorporated into the Constitution.
