= Pakistan National Commission for Minorities =

Commission for religious minorities

The Pakistan National Commission for Minorities is a commission for the preservation of religious minorities in Pakistan. It is under Ministry of Religious Affairs and Inter-faith Harmony. National Minorities Day has been observed annually on 11 August in Pakistan since 2009 to honor the services and sacrifices rendered by religious minorities for the country over the years.

== Background ==
In June 2014, the Supreme Court of Pakistan in the Peshawar church bombing case mandated the federal government to form a national council for minorities. Till 2018 no such Commission was formed. So the Centre for Social Justice, the Human Rights Commission of Pakistan and the Cecil and Iris Chaudhry Foundation filed a public interest litigation in the Supreme Court to have the judgement implemented. On 19 February 2020, the Ministry of Religious Affairs and Inter-faith Harmony requested the Supreme Court to give more time for the formation of the commission and the Court gave 2 months to constitute the commission.

== Structure ==
The commission contains six official and 12 non-official members including the chairman for a term of three years.

The 6 official members are chairman of the Council of Islamic Ideology, secretary of the Ministry of Religious Affairs, one member from the Ministry of Interior, Ministry of Law and Justice, the Ministry of Human Rights and the Federal Education and Professional Training each.

The 12 non-official members include 2 Muslims, 3 Hindus, 3 Christians, 2 Sikh, 1 Parsi and 1 Kalasha members.

== Criticism ==
The Ahmadiya were excluded from the Commission. A resolution seeking their inclusion was submitted in the Pakistan assembly in which it is said that the Ahmadiya to be included in the Commission, if their top leaders submits that the Ahmadiyas are non Muslims.

Advocate Sarwan Kumar Bheel is a Scheduled Caste rights activist who has highlighted the need for representation of the Scheduled Caste community in the National Commission for Minorities in Pakistan. He believes that many of the issues faced by minorities in Pakistan are connected to the Scheduled Caste community, which is often ignored in various decision-making processes and institutional frameworks, The Hindu Sudhar Sabha criticized the commission for excluding Scheduled castes Hindus, who constitute majority of the Hindu community, Peter Jacob, the Catholic director of the Centre for Social Justice said that the minority commission is under the Ministry of Religious Affairs and have no statutory powers. He added that the formation of the minority commission was supposed to be formed as an act of parliament.

Another criticism is about the inclusion of two Muslim members in the a commission for religious minorities. Religious Minority leaders questioned that if non-Muslims cannot be part of the Council of Islamic Ideology, then why include Muslim members in the minority commission.

== See also ==
- National Minorities Day (Pakistan)
- Secularism in Pakistan
