= Law of Pakistan =

The law of Pakistan is the law and legal system existing in the Islamic Republic of Pakistan. Pakistani law is based upon the legal system of British India; thus ultimately on the former colonial common law of England and Wales.

== History ==
Following the establishment of the Dominion of Pakistan in 1947, the laws of the erstwhile British Raj remained in force. At no point in Pakistan's legal history was there an intention to begin the statute book afresh. The founder of Pakistan, Muhammad Ali Jinnah had a vision regarding the law of Pakistan, to implement a system in accordance to Islamic teachings, but it was never fulfilled, although it was fulfilled at the later stage when Pakistan had its first constitution in 1956. This vision, however, did have a lasting effect on later Pakistani lawmakers. During the reign of General Muhammad Zia-ul-Haq, elements of Islamic Sharia law were incorporated into Pakistani law, leading to the institution of a Federal Shariat Court (FSC). In some Federally and Provincially Administered Tribal Areas [(FATA) and (PATA)], a system of law employing traditional methods, which persists at the local level. At this informal level, disputes are settled by a jirga, a council of tribal elders.

== Influences ==
The political ideology was largely sculpted by the likes of individuals such as Muhammad Ali Jinnah, the founder of Pakistan – while studying law at Lincoln's Inn in London, he became an admirer of British liberalism. It was these influences that led to the Pakistani common law being based upon the common law of England and Wales. He took on the role as titular figurehead of Pakistani politics and as a result Pakistan is now a common law system, with an adversarial court procedure and follows other common law practices such as judicial precedent and the concept of stare decisis. However Pakistan differs from the classic common law in many ways. Firstly both the criminal and civil laws are almost completely codified, a legacy from the days of the British Raj, when English laws were extended to India by ways of statute. Jury trials have been phased out in Pakistan since independence, because of judicial and public dissatisfaction with their operation; one Pakistani judge called jury trials as "amateur justice". In constitutional law matters Pakistani jurisprudence has been greatly influenced by the United States legal system, Pakistan has adopted a US-style Federal Structure. Islamic law and traditional jirga-based law has also influenced the country's judicial development.

== See also ==
- Law enforcement in Pakistan
- Family law
- Women's Protection Bill
- Marriage in Pakistan
- Women related laws in Pakistan
- Inheritance law in Pakistan
- Judicial system of Turkey
- Swiss Civil Code
