= Eighteenth Amendment to the Constitution of Pakistan =

2010 amendment to the Pakistani constitution

The Eighteenth Amendment to the Constitution of Pakistan (Urdu: آئین پاکستان میں اٹھارہویں ترمیم) was passed by the National Assembly of Pakistan on April 8, 2010, removing the power of the President of Pakistan to dissolve the Parliament unilaterally, turning Pakistan from a semi-presidential to a parliamentary republic, and renaming North-West Frontier Province to Khyber Pakhtunkhwa. It also gave self-governing, legislative and financial autonomy to provincial authorities. The package was intended to counter the sweeping powers amassed by the presidency under former presidents General Pervez Musharraf and General Muhammad Zia-ul-Haq and to ease political instability in Pakistan. The bill reversed many infringements on the Constitution of Pakistan over several decades by its military rulers. The amendment bill was passed by the Senate of Pakistan on April 15, 2010, and it became an act of parliament when President Asif Ali Zardari signed the bill on April 19, 2010. It was the first time in Pakistan's history that a president relinquished a significant part of his powers willingly and transferred them to parliament and the office of the prime minister.

== Background ==
The power of the president to dissolve the Parliament was enacted by the Eighth Amendment to the Constitution of Pakistan during the presidency of Gen. Muhammad Zia-ul-Haq, before it was removed by then-prime minister Nawaz Sharif during his second term by the Thirteenth Amendment. It was finally restored during the presidency of Gen. Pervez Musharraf by the Seventeenth Amendment. This bill is the first bill since 1973 to decrease the powers of the president.

Back then, this amounted to the only democratically elected parliament to fully complete its tenure in the history of Pakistan from 2003 to 2008, albeit under Musharraf. The second complete parliamentary term was completed by the PPP led government from 2008–2013 which had in fact passed the 18th Amendment. However, this 2008–2013 term is often touted to be the first complete democratic change of power without a military president or a coup d'état in Pakistan.

== Changes to the Constitution ==
The major new features were also introduced into the constitution, including the following:

- The name of the former president of Pakistan, Gen Zia-ul-haq, has been removed from the text of Constitution
- The 17th Amendment and Legal Framework Order as introduced by Musharraf has been repealed
- Turning Pakistan from a semi-presidential to a parliamentary republic
- The Self-governing, legislative and financial autonomy was granted to the Provinces
- North-West Frontier Province has been renamed to Khyber Pakhtunkhwa with effect from 9 November 2010
- The ban on third time prime ministership and chief ministership has been lifted
- Holding constitution in abeyance is tantamount to high treason
- The Council of Common Interests (CCI) has been reconstituted with the prime minister as its chairperson and the body should meet at least once in 90 days
- The restructuring of National Finance Commission Award (NFC Award)
- An independent judicial commission will recommend the appointment procedure of superior judges and the final names of judges will be decided by parliamentary commission
- A Chief Election Commissioner will be appointed through consensus between treasury and opposition
- Establishment of Islamabad High Court and benches of high courts in Mingora and Turbat
- Recognition of the children's right to education and insertion of a new section under Article 25A to provide constitutional guarantee that state will provide free and compulsory education to all girls and boys up to age 16.
- The power to dissolve the parliament was withdrawn from the President.

== Impact ==
292 of the 342 members of the National Assembly, the lower house of Parliament, voted in favour of the amendment. The amendment turns the President into a ceremonial head of state and transfers power to the Prime Minister, and removes the limit on a Prime Minister serving more than two terms, opening the way for Nawaz Sharif and Asif Zardari to run again. The North-West Frontier Province is renamed Khyber Pakhtunkhwa, in accordance with the wishes of its Pashtun-majority population, with effect from 9 November 2010. Among other changes, courts will no longer be able to endorse suspensions of the constitution, a judicial commission will appoint judges, and the president will no longer be able to appoint the head of the Election Commission. The bill also enhances provincial autonomy. The President will no longer be able to declare emergency rule in any province unilaterally.

=== Devolved ministries ===
The following ministries were devolved at federal level and were given to the provinces.

According to 18th Amendment:

1. Ministry of Education became Ministry of Federal Education and Professional Training
2. Ministry of Archaeology and Culture became Ministry of Culture
3. Ministry of Environment became Ministry of Climate Change
4. Ministry of Health became Ministry of National Health Services, Regulation and Coordination
5. Ministry of Special Initiatives abolished at federal level.
6. Ministry of Labour and Manpower became Ministry of Overseas Pakistanis & Human Resource Development
7. Ministry of Local Government and Rural Development abolished at federal level.
8. Ministry of Minorities’ Affairs merged with the Ministry of Religious Affairs
9. Ministry of Population Welfare abolished at federal level.
10. Ministry of Social Welfare and Special Education abolished at federal level.
11. Ministry of Sports became Pakistan Sports Board at federal level and given to provinces.
12. Ministry of Tourism's Powers given to Pakistan Tourism Development Corporation
13. Ministry of Women Development abolished at federal level.
14. Ministry of Youth Affairs abolished at federal level.
15. Ministry of Zakat and Ushr abolished at federal level given to provinces.

== Response ==
Ahmed Kurd, former president of the Supreme Court Bar Association of Pakistan, said "We fully support the 18th Amendment. It is tantamount to the overhauling of the constitution, which had been subverted by military dictators since its inception. In the past, parliaments have just been 'rubber stamps', whereas the present parliament seemed to be well aware of its obligations, and therefore, was 'throwing out' the 'unconstitutional' amendments."

== See also ==
- Amendments to the Constitution of Pakistan
