= Thirteenth Amendment to the Constitution of Pakistan =

Constitutional amendment from 1997

The Thirteenth Amendment to the Constitution of Pakistan (Urdu: آئین پاکستان میں تیرہویں ترمیم) was a short-lived amendment to the Constitution of Pakistan, adopted by the Parliament of Pakistan in 1997 by the civilian government of Prime Minister Nawaz Sharif. It stripped the President of Pakistan of his reserve power to dissolve the National Assembly, and thereby triggering new elections and dismissing the Prime Minister. The Constitutional Amendment was supported by both the government and the opposition, and was thus passed unanimously. With the enforcing of this amendment, Pakistan's system of government was shifted from Semi-presidential system to Parliamentary democratic republic system.

The amendment removed Article 58(2)(b) of the Constitution, which gave the President the power to:

dissolve the National Assembly in his discretion where, in his opinion ... a situation has arisen in which the Government of the Federation cannot be carried on in accordance with the provisions of the Constitution and an appeal to the electorate is necessary.

In Pakistan, once legislators are elected to national or provincial assemblies, the people cannot recall them before the end of their five-year terms. In the past, this has contributed to a sense of immunity on the part of members of the ruling party, and to a public perception of rampant corruption among leading politicians – in 1997, Pakistan received the second-worst score in the world on Transparency International's Corruption Perceptions Index.

A few months later, the Fourteenth Amendment was passed, which subjected Members of Parliament to very strict party discipline by giving party leaders unlimited power to dismiss legislators who failed to vote as directed. This virtually eliminated any chance of a Prime Minister of being thrown out of office by a motion of no confidence. The amendments removed nearly all institutional checks and balances on the Prime Minister's power, by effectively removing the legal remedies by which he could be dismissed.

Nawaz Sharif's government became increasingly unpopular after the passage of these amendments, even though it was the election of his Pakistan Muslim League by a heavy majority that enabled him to alter the Constitution in the first place. A few months later, Nawaz Sharif's partisan stormed the Supreme Court of Pakistan and forced the resignation of the Chief Justice. This strengthened the perception that the country was becoming a civilian dictatorship.

In 1999, General Pervez Musharraf assumed power in a military-led bloodless coup. Among the reasons he gave for doing so were the destruction of institutional checks and balances, and the prevailing corruption in the political leadership. The coup was widely welcomed in Pakistan. Amongst the Opposition, ex-Prime Minister Benazir Bhutto was one of the first leaders to congratulate General Pervez Musharraf for removing Nawaz Sharif. The Supreme Court later validated the removal on the grounds that the Thirteenth and Fourteenth Amendments resulted in a situation for which there was no constitutional remedy.

In October 2002, elections were held in Pakistan. In December 2003, Parliament passed the Seventeenth Amendment, which partially restored the President's reserve power to dissolve Parliament and thus remove the Prime Minister from office, but made it subject to Supreme Court approval.
