= Constitution of Pakistan =

Supreme law of Pakistan

Constitution of Pakistan آئینِ پاکستان
- State emblem of Pakistan

Overview
- Jurisdiction: Pakistan
- Created: 20 October 1972; 54 years ago
- Presented: 20 October 1972
- Ratified: 10 April 1973; 53 years ago
- Date effective: 14 August 1973; 53 years ago
- System: Federal parliamentary constitutional republic

Government structure
- Branches: Three (Executive, Legislature, and Judiciary)
- Head of state: President of Pakistan
- Chambers: Two (Senate and National Assembly)
- Executive: Prime minister–led cabinet responsible to the lower house of the parliament
- Judiciary: Supreme court, constitutional court, high courts, and district courts
- Federalism: Yes (four provinces and a federal territory) (Note: Azad Kashmir and Gilgit-Baltistan, despite being part of the country, are not within the federal system; and have their own separate systems, established by the Parliament of Pakistan. Gilgit-Baltistan acts as a 'semi-province', while Azad Kashmir is completely autonomous.)
- Electoral college: Yes, for presidential elections

History
- Amendments: 27
- Last amended: 13 November 2025
- Location: Parliament House, Islamabad
- Commissioned by: Parliament of Pakistan
- Author: Parliament of Pakistan
- Signatories: 145 (out of 150) members of the fifth Parliament
- Media type: Paperback
- Supersedes: Constitution of Pakistan, 1962; Legal Framework Order, 1970

The Constitution of Pakistan (Urdu: آئینِ پاکستان, romanised: Ā'īn-e-Pākistān; also known as the 1973 Constitution) is the supreme law of Pakistan. The document guides Pakistan's law, political culture, and system. It sets out the state's outline, the fundamental rights of the population, the state's law and orders, and also the structure and establishment of the institutions and the armed forces. Drafted by the government of Zulfikar Ali Bhutto, with additional assistance from the country's opposition parties, it was unanimously approved by the 5th Parliament on 10 April and ratified on 14 August 1973. The first three chapters establish the rules, mandate, and separate powers of the three branches of the government: a bicameral legislature; an executive branch governed by the prime minister as chief executive; and an apex federal judiciary headed by Supreme Court. The Constitution designates the president of Pakistan as a ceremonial head of state who is to represent the unity of the state. The first six articles of the constitution outline the political system as a federal parliamentary republic system; as well as Islam as its state religion. The Constitution also encapsulates provisions stipulating the legal system's compliance with Islamic injunctions contained in the Quran and Sunnah.

The Parliament cannot make any laws which may be repugnant or contrary to the Constitution; however, the Constitution itself may be amended by a two-thirds majority in both the houses of the bicameral Parliament, unlike the previous legal documents of 1956 and 1962. It has been amended over time, and most recent impulses for political upgrades and reforms has been amended. Although enforced in 1973, Pakistan, however, celebrates the adoption of the constitution on 23 March—when the first set was promulgated in 1956 each and every year as Republic Day. Technically there are 27 amendments but 23 amendments were made in constitution and three were not passed by the parliament as the three amendments collapsed.

Currently the promulgated Constitution of Pakistan, in its amended form, stands as the 6th lengthiest constitution of the world with a word count of 56,240 Words.

== Origins and historical background ==
In a radio talk addressed to the people of Pakistan, broadcast in February 1948, Jinnah expressed his views regarding Pakistan's constitution-to-be in the following way:

The Constitution of Pakistan is yet to be framed by the Pakistan Constituent Assembly, I do not know what the ultimate shape of the constitution is going to be, but I am sure that it will be of a democratic type, embodying the essential principles of Islam. Today these are as applicable in actual life as these were 1300 years ago. Islam and its idealism have taught us democracy. It has taught equality of man, justice and fair play to everybody. We are the inheritors of these glorious traditions and are fully alive to our responsibilities and obligations as framers of the future constitution of Pakistan.

Pakistan was founded in 1947 as a Dominion (an independent realm or kingdom) within the British Commonwealth. The same was true in independent India. During its first few years of existence the British monarch was also Pakistan's head of state, as is still the case in Canada, Australia, etc. Before writing a constitution, a Constituent Assembly passed the Objectives Resolution, on the insistence of the ulama and Jamaat-e-Islami, in March 1949 to define the basic directive principles of the new state and to declare state recognition of the sovereignty of Allah over the universe. The Objectives Resolution affirmed the role of democracy and contained religious provisions to enable society to adhere to the teachings of the Quran and Sunnah. The Objectives Resolution has henceforth been inserted as a preamble into each of Pakistan's subsequent constitutions.

The country became a republic when its first constitution was approved in 1956 but this was abrogated in 1958 after a military Coup d'état. ,Pakistan's second constitution was approved in 1962. It granted executive power to the president and abolished the office of the prime minister. It also institutionalised the intervention of military in politics by providing that for twenty years, the president or the defence minister must be a person who had held a rank not lower than that of lieutenant-general in the army. The 1962 constitution was suspended in 1969 and abrogated in 1972.

The 1973 constitution was the first in Pakistan to be framed by elected representatives. Unlike the 1962 constitution it gave Pakistan a parliamentary democracy with executive power concentrated in the office of the prime minister, and the formal head of state—the president—limited to acting on the advice of the prime minister.

The Constitution states that all laws are to conform with the injunctions of Islam as laid down in the Quran and Sunnah. The 1973 Constitution also created certain institutions such as the Shariat Court and the Council of Islamic Ideology to channel the interpretation and application of Islam.

After another coup d'état in 1977, the constitution was held in abeyance until it was "restored" in 1985 but with an amendment (the Eighth) shifting power from the parliament and Prime Minister to the president. Another Amendment (Seventeenth) in 2004 continued this shift, but in 2010, the Eighteenth amendment reduced presidential powers, returning the government to a parliamentary republic.

=== Previous legislation as source ===
The successful independence movement led the establishment of Pakistan, independent from the British Raj in 1947. The British Empire divided the Raj into two parts, India and Pakistan.

The provisions of the Government of India Act, 1935, had greatly influenced the state and served as its basic legal document until 1956. In 1950, Prime Minister Liaquat Ali Khan authored the first annexe that would pave a path to the drafting of the Constitution. Elected in 1947, the first Constituent Assembly drafted and adopted its first constitution in 1956.

==== 1956 Constitution ====
Following the adoption of a constitution in India in 1950, Pakistan's lawmakers were incentified to work on their constitution. Prime Minister Chaudhry Muhammad Ali and his government officials worked with the opposition parties in the country to formulate a constitution for Pakistan.

Finally, the joint work led to the formulation of the first set of the constitution on 23 March 1956—a day when Pakistan celebrates its Republic Day over the adoption of the constitution. The constitution provided for parliamentary form of government with a unicameral legislature. It officially adopted Pakistan as "Islamic Republic" and the principle of parity was introduced. Its features were:

- Islamic Republic of Pakistan – Official name of the country was adopted
- Objectives Resolution – The objective resolution was included as preamble by the constitution.
- System of government – Parliamentary with a prime minister as head of government.
- Unicameral Legislature – A single house, only a National Assembly that would consist of 300 members; 150 members from each East and West Pakistan
- President – Required to be a Muslim and ceremonial head of state. In case of internal or external danger she/he could declare a state of emergency in the country.
- Islamic law – No law would be passed against the teachings of the Quran and Sunnah.
- Independent Judiciary – The Supreme Court as an apex court – a final arbitrator of all the decisions.
- Fundamental rights included freedoms of movement, speech and, profession and profess religion, right to life, liberty, and property.
- Language – English, Urdu and Bengali were made national languages.

By the Constitution, Iskander Mirza assumed the presidency but his constant personal involvement in national affairs, contrary to the Constitution, resulted in the dismissal of four elected prime ministers in two years. On 7 October 1958 Mirza staged a coup d'état, imposed martial law, abrogated the Constitution, and appointed the army chief General Ayub Khan as the Chief Martial Law Administrator. Shortly afterwards on 27 October 1958, General Ayub Khan deposed Mirza and declared himself president.

==== 1962 Constitution ====
General Ayub Khan appointed a Constitution Commission to draft another part of the constitution under Chief Justice Muhammad Shahabuddin. Submitted its considerations on 6 May 1961, Ayub Khan altered the entire version of the constitution which was entirely different from the one recommended by Chief Justice Muhammad Shahabuddin. It was promulgated on 8 June 1962. Main feature of this set was the introduction of the presidential system and more consolidated powers to the President. No further changes were carried out to oppose the 1956 document. Its features includes:

- More powers to the President of Pakistan.
- Strengthening of the Islamic Ideology Council.

==== 1970 Legal Framework Order ====
President Ayub Khan invited Chief of Army Staff General Yahya Khan to enforce the martial law in the country. On assuming the presidency, General Yahya Khan acceded to popular demands by abolishing the one-unit system in West Pakistan and ordered general elections on the principle of one man, one vote.

The military government and President Yahya himself made no efforts to frame a constitution, aside from issuing the extrajudicial order in 1970. Across the country, the expectations were that a National Assembly would be set up by holding a free and fair election. To hold the proposed elections, President Yahya promulgated a Legal Framework Order on 30 March 1970 that also spelled out the fundamental principles of the proposed constitution and the structure and composition of the national and provincial assemblies.

In December 1970, nationwide general elections were held simultaneously for both the national and five provincial assemblies. The nationalist Awami League (AL) secured the mandate of East Pakistan but failed to perform in any four provinces of Pakistan. The socialist Pakistan People's Party (PPP) under the leadership of Zulfikar Ali Bhutto gained a mandate in Punjab and Sindh but failed in East Pakistan, NWFP and Balochistan.

==== 1970 constitutional crisis ====
Constitutional crisis grew further when the AL refused to make concessions over its six points to draft the constitution and instead maintaining that the AL was able to frame a constitution and to form a central government on its own.

The PPP was not willing to dilute the authority of the federal government in spite of assuring full provincial autonomy for all the provinces of Pakistan. Negotiations on framing the work on constitution were held between January and March 1971 between leaders of the PPP, the AL, and the military government of Yahya Khan, which turned out to be a failure. Under the LFO, the President was to decide when the National Assembly was to meet. By 13 February 1971, the President Yahya announced that the National Assembly was to meet at Dhaka on 3 March 1971. By this time the differences between the main parties to the conflict had already crystallised. Over the six-point issue, the PPP was convinced that a federation based on the six points would lead to a feeble confederation in name only and was part of a larger Indian plan to break up and destroy Pakistan. These fears were evidently shared by the military leaders in the west, including President Yahya Khan who had publicly described Sheikh Mujibur Rehman as the 'future Prime Minister of Pakistan' on 14 January 1971. Bhutto announced on 15 February that his party would not attend the National Assembly unless there was 'some amount of reciprocity' from the Awami League. Sheikh Mujib replied at a press conference on 21 February, asserting that "Our stand is absolutely clear. The constitution will be framed on the basis of the six points".

Such an announcement led the PPP to demand the removal of the National Assembly session, or the opening session to be postponed. The PPP threatened to stage a large scale general strike all over the country. Under pressure by the PPP, President Yahya postponed the National Assembly session on 25 March which came as a shattering disillusionment to the AL and their supporters throughout East Pakistan. It was seen as a betrayal and as proof of the authorities of Pakistan to deny them the fruits of their electoral victory. This resulted in the outbreak of violence in East Pakistan. The Awami League launched a non-cooperation movement as they virtually controlled the entire province. Due to disturbances in East Pakistan, no National Assembly session was called and the military moved into East Pakistan and executed Operation Searchlight. The civil disobedience movement turned into an armed liberation movement backed by India.

With India successfully intervening in the conflict, the Pakistan military surrendered to the Indian military and almost 93,000 military personnel were taken as prisoners of war on 16 December 1971. Demoralised, gaining notoriety in the country, and finding himself unable to control the situation, President Yahya ultimately handed over the national power to the PPP, whose leader Zulfikar Ali Bhutto was sworn in on 20 December 1971 as President and as the (first civilian) Chief Martial Law Administrator.

== Constitutional convention ==
After Bangladesh was formed in 1971, the PPP formed the government and partially enacted the 1962 constitution. President Zulfikar Ali Bhutto called for a constitutional convention and invited the leaders of the all political parties to meet him on 17 April 1972. Leaders and constitutional experts of the Islamic political parties, conservative parties, socialists and communist parties were delegated to attend the constitutional convention in 1972.

=== Drafting and ratification ===
The law experts, constitutional analysts, and country's reputed clergymen worked on formulating a constitution that they hoped would represent the will and desire of people. Unlike earlier attempts, the convention was not meant for new laws or piecemeal alterations, but for the "sole and express purpose of revising the 1956 articles." Also, the convention was not limited to the religion, exigencies of government and the preservation of the State; rather it was intended to maintain delicacy in commerce, finances, issue of loans to federation, and Separation of powers. Several key ideas of the philosophy of John Locke and Islamic provisions on civil rights were interchanged in the Constitution.

The Constitution ultimately established a bicameral Parliament, with the National Assembly as the lower house and the Senate as the upper house. It also established the parliamentary form of government with Prime Minister as its head of government; the elected National Assembly genuinely representing the will of the people. The Constitution truly maintained a delicate balance between traditionalists and modernists and reflected heavy compromises on fundamental religious rights in the country. The fundamental rights, freedoms of speech, religion, press, movement, association, thought, and intellectual, life, liberty and property and right to bear arms were introduced in the new Constitution. Islam was declared as the State religion of Pakistan. Geography and border statue of the country was redefined and "Pakistan was to be a Federation of Four Provinces." The Constitution was written in the point of representing the conservative Islam as well as reflecting a heavy compromise over the religious rights and humanism ideas, advocated by the PPP.

On 20 October 1972, the draft was revived by all leaders of the political parties and signed the declaration of adopting the Constitution in the National Assembly on 2 February 1973. Ratified unanimously on 19 April 1973, the Constitution came into full effect on 14 August 1973. On the same day, the successful vote of confidence movement in the Parliament endorsed Zulfikar Bhutto as the elected Prime Minister after later relinquishing the presidency after appointing Fazal-i-Ilahi to that office.

== Structure ==
=== Fundamental rights ===
Contrary to Constitution of 1956 and Constitution of 1962, several ideas in the Constitution were new, and guaranteed security to each citizen of Pakistan. First part of the Constitution introduced the definition of State, the idea of life, liberty and property, individual equality, prohibition of slavery, preservation of languages, right to fair trial, and provided safeguard as to arrest and detention as well as providing safeguards against discrimination in services.

The due process clause of the Constitution was partly based on the British Common law, as many founding fathers and legal experts of the country had followed the British legal tradition. The fundamental rights are supreme in the Constitution and any law that is ultra vires the fundamental rights can be struck down by the Apex Courts in their constitutional jurisdiction vested on them under Article 199 of the Constitution.

=== Provisions ===
In contrast to the constitutions of India and Bangladesh, the Constitution reflected a heavy compromise over several issues to maintain a delicate balance of power among the country's institutions. The Constitution defined the role of Islam; Pakistan was to be a Federation of Four Provinces and shall be known as the Islamic Republic of Pakistan; introduction of check and balances, separation of powers, and provided the federal system under which the government should govern.

The Constitution established a "Bicameral Parliament" as a legislative authority that consists of the Senate as Upper house (providing equal provincial representation), and National Assembly as Lower house (providing the will and representation of people). The Constitution put stipulation on the eligibility of becoming President and Prime Minister that only "Muslim" of not less than forty-five years of age and is qualified for becoming the Prime Minister. No law repugnant to Islam shall be enacted and the present laws shall also be Islamised. The Constitution also introduced a new institution known as the "Council of Common Interests" consisting of Chief Minister of each four provinces and an equal number of Cabinet ministers of the Government nominated by the Prime Minister. The Council could formulate and regulate the policy in the Part II of the Legislative List. In case of complaint of interference in water supply by any province the Council would look into the complaint.

Another major innovative introduction in the Constitution is the establishment of the National Finance Commission (NFC) consisting of the Provincial and Finance Ministers and other members to advice on distribution of revenues between the federation and the provinces. The Constitution's first parts introduce the Islamic way of life, promotion of local government, full participation of women in national life, protection of minorities, promotion of social and economic well being of the people, and strengthening the bonds with the Muslim world and to work for international peace.

The Islamic laws and Sharia
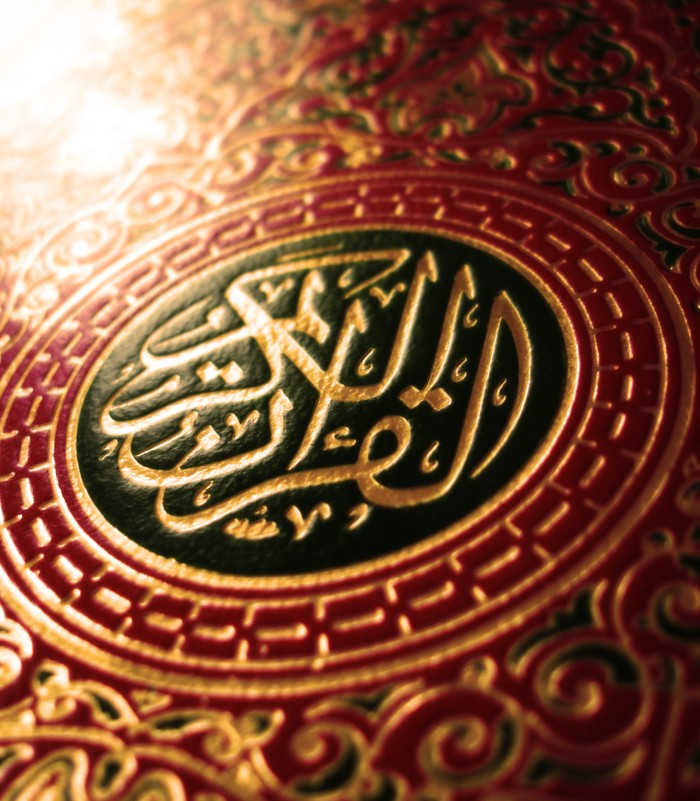
The Quran

Under the Constitution, the Fundamental Rights include security of person, safeguards as to arrest and detention, prohibition of slavery and forced labour, freedom of movement, freedom of association, freedom of speech, freedom to profess religion and safeguards to religious institutions, non-discrimination in respect of access to public places and in service, preservation of languages, script and culture. The judiciary enjoys full supremacy over the other organs of the state. About national languages, Urdu was declared as national languages, and English as official language; all other languages were preserved by the Constitution.

=== Islamic introduction ===
Many key ideas on regarding the role of Islam in the State that were mentioned in 1956 Articles were made part of the Constitution:

- The official name "Islamic Republic of Pakistan" as selected for the state of Pakistan.
- Islam is declared as the state religion of Pakistan.
- Enabling of living life, culture, and customs of Muslims, individually or collectively, in accordance with the fundamental principles and basic concepts of Islam.
- Teachings on Arabic, Quran, and Islamiyat to be compulsory in country's institutions and to secure correct and exact printing and publishing of the Quran.
- Proper organisations of Zakat, Waqf, and mosques is ensured.
- Prevent prostitution, gambling and consumption of alcohol, printing, publication, circulation, pornography, and display of obscene literature and advertisements.
- Required to be a Muslim to run for bid of becoming the President (male or female) and/or Prime Minister (male or female). No restriction as to religion or gender on any other post, up to and including provincial governor and Chief Minister.
- All existing laws shall be brought in conformity with the injunctions of Islam as laid down in the Quran and Sunnah and no law shall be enacted which is repugnant to such injunctions.
- A Council of Islamic Ideology shall be constituted referred to as the Islamic advisory council.
- The Constitution of Pakistan defined a Muslim as a person who believes in the unity and oneness of Allah, in the absolute and unqualified finality of the Prophethood of The Holy Islamic Prophet Hazrat Syedna Muhammad ﷺ, and does not believe in, or recognise as a prophet or religious reformer, any person who claimed or claims to be a prophet, in any sense of the word or of any description whatsoever, after The Holy Messenger Hazrat Syedna Muhammad ﷺ .
- In keeping with this definition, the Second Amendment to the Constitution (1974) declared for the first time the Ahmadiyya Community and/or the Lahori Group as non-Muslims, since their leader, Mirza Ghulam Ahmad, claimed to be prophet of God.
- However, the Fourth Amendment (1975) set aside six seats in the National Assembly for non-Muslim representatives to protect minority rights.
- The state shall endeavour to strengthen the bonds of unity among Muslim countries.
- Islamic revisions were introduced into the Pakistan Penal Code.

=== Parts ===
The individual Articles of the Constitution are grouped together into the following Parts:

- Preamble
- Part I – Introductory [Articles 1–6]
- Part II – Fundamental Rights and Principles of Policy [Articles 7–40]
- Part III – The Federation of Pakistan [Articles 41–100]
- Part IV – Provinces [Articles 101-140A]
- Part V – Relations between Federation and Provinces [Articles 141–159]
- Part VI – Finance, Property, Contracts and Suits [Articles 160–174]
- Part VII – The Judicature [Articles 175–212]
- Part VIII – Elections [Articles 213–226]
- Part IX – Islamic Provisions [Articles 227–231]
- Part X – Emergency Provisions [Articles 232–237]
- Part XI – Amendment of Constitution [Articles 238–239]
- Part XII – Miscellaneous [Articles 240–280]

=== Schedule ===
Schedules are lists in the Constitution that categorise and tabulate bureaucratic activity and policy of the Government.

- First Schedule – Laws exempted from the operation of Article 8(1), 8(2), 8(3b), and 8(4)
- Second Schedule – Election of President" Article 41(3)
- Third Schedule: – Oaths of Office: Article 42, Article 91(5)–92(2), Article 53(2)–61,
- Fourth Schedule: – Legislative Lists
- Fifth Schedule: – Remuneration and Terms and Conditions of Service of Judges: [Article 205]

== Amendments ==
Unlike the previous documents, the Constitution cannot be changed, instead constitutional amendments are passed; altering its effect. Amendments to the Constitution are made through the Parliament, where a two-thirds majority and voting is required in both houses for a constitutional amendment to take its effect, in accordance to the Constitution. In addition to this, certain amendments which pertain to the federal nature of the Constitution must be ratified by a majority of provincial legislatures.

As of 2019, 25 amendments have been made to the Constitution. Among the most important of these are the Eighth (1985) and Seventeenth Amendments (2004), which changed the government from a parliamentary system to a semi-presidential system. By far the largest change to the Constitution was the Eighteenth Amendment made in 2010 which reversed these expansions of presidential powers, returning the government to a parliamentary republic, and also defined any attempt to subvert, abrogate, or suspend the constitution as an act of high treason. Another significant amendment was the Second Amendment which declared Ahmadis to be non-Muslims. It was unanimously passed by parliament in 1974.

In these amendments, the Twenty-Fifth amendment incorporated the former Federally Administered Tribal Areas into the province of Khyber Pakhtunkhwa.

In 2017 the Constitution (Twenty-seventh Amendment) Act, 2017 was proposed to the Constitution of Pakistan. It aimed to implement recommendations of the Parliamentary Committee on Electoral Reforms. It never secured the required constitutional majorities or presidential assent, so it was never adopted and is not part of the Constitution.

In 2024, the Twenty-Sixth Constitutional Amendment was enacted on 21 October, introducing landmark reforms to Pakistan's judicial system, with a focus on the Supreme Court and High Courts and in 2025, the Twenty-Seventh Amendment focused mostly on the military structure and the civil-military relations. It changed Article 243, continuing decades of shifts in civil-military authority. The Twenty-Seventh Amendment abolished the Chairman of the Joint Chiefs of Staff Committee and made the Chief of Army Staff, subject to life-long constitutional immunities, the Chief of Defence Forces with critics arguing that the move further consolidates military authority. Additionally, the amendment proposed giving prime minister the power to appoint or remove the judges of the supreme court and establishment of a Federal Constitutional Court which, analysts claim, reduced the power of the Supreme Court. With the passing of the bill in November, two senior judges of the Supreme Court, Syed Mansoor Ali Shah and Athar Minallah resigned in protest, citing 'crippled judicial independence.' Former Supreme Court judge Shah criticised the constitutional amendments, claiming they have undermined Pakistan's constitutional framework and judicial independence. He described the change as move towards autocracy and proposed a pan to resist them. the amendments, which alter judicial appointments and powers, have sparked ongoing debate between supporters and critics in Pakistan's political and legal circles.

== Original text ==
=== Preamble ===
Whereas sovereignty over the entire Universe belongs to Almighty Allah alone, and the authority to be exercised by the people of Pakistan within the limits prescribed by Him is a sacred trust;

And whereas it is the will of the people of Pakistan to establish an order :-

Wherein the State shall exercise its powers and authority through the chosen representatives of the people;

Wherein the principles of democracy, freedom, equality, tolerance and social justice, as enunciated by Islam, shall be fully observed;

Wherein the Muslims shall be enabled to order their lives in the individual and collective spheres in accordance with the teachings and requirements of Islam as set out in the Holy Quran and Sunnah;

Wherein adequate provision shall be made for the minorities freely to profess and practise their religions and develop their cultures;

Wherein the territories now included in or in accession with Pakistan and such other territories as may hereafter be included in or accede to Pakistan shall form a Federation wherein the units will be autonomous with such boundaries and limitations on their powers and authority as may be prescribed;

Therein shall be guaranteed fundamental rights, including equality of status, of opportunity and before law, social, economic and political justice, and freedom of thought, expression, belief, faith, worship and association, subject to law and public morality;

Wherein adequate provision shall be made to safeguard the legitimate interests of minorities and backward and depressed classes;

Wherein the independence of the judiciary shall be fully secured;

Wherein the integrity of the territories of the Federation, its independence and all its rights, including its sovereign rights on land, sea and air, shall be safeguarded;

So that the people of Pakistan may prosper and attain their rightful and honoured place amongst the nations of the World and make their full contribution towards international peace and progress and happiness of humanity :

Now, therefore, we, the people of Pakistan,

Cognisant of our responsibility before Almighty Allah and men;

Cognisant of the sacrifices made by the people in the cause of Pakistan;

Faithful to the declaration made by the Founder of Pakistan, Quaid-i-Azam Mohammad Ali Jinnah, that Pakistan would be a democratic State based on Islamic principles of social justice;

Dedicated to the preservation of democracy achieved by the unremitting struggle of the people against oppression and tyranny;

Inspired by the resolve to protect our national and political unity and solidarity by creating an egalitarian society through a new order;

Do hereby, through our representatives in the National Assembly, adopt, enact and give to ourselves, this Constitution.

== Signatories ==
All MNAs from West Pakistan elected in the 1970 general election signed the Constitution except Mian Mahmud Ali Kasuri (PPP MNA from Lahore-III constituency) Abdul Hayee Baloch (NAP(W) MNA from Kalat-I constituency), Abdul Khaliq Khan (PPP MNA from Mardan constituency), Haji Ali Ahmed Khan (PPP MNA from Hyderabad-IV constituency), and Nizamuddin Haider (CML MNA from Bahawalpur-I constituency). Sahibzada Muhammad Nazeer Sultan (MJUP MNA from Jhang-III constituency) was the last serving member of the National Assembly who was also elected as the Member of National Assembly in the 1970 elections & was one of the last signatories of 1973 Constitution of the Islamic Republic of Pakistan.

Unlike the Constitution of 1956 (in whose creation 23 Hindus - 20 from East Bengal, 2 from West Punjab, 1 from Sindh, 2 Christians - Peter Paul Gomez from East Bengal & Cecil Edward Gibbon from West Pakistan & 2 women - Begum Shaista Suhrawardy Ikramullah from East Bengal and Shah Nawaz Begum Jahan Ara from West Punjab were involved), the Constitution of 1973 had no representation from the minorities & women.

== See also ==
- History of Pakistan
- Politics of Pakistan
- Constitution Day (Pakistan)
- Constitution of Pakistan of 1956
- Constitution of Pakistan of 1962
- Constitutional economics
- Constitutionalism
- History of democracy
- List of national constitutions
