= Para 66 =

Paragraph number 66 in Musharraf high treason case verdict

- Author: Waqar Ahmed Seth
- Language: English
- Subject: Verdict in Musharraf high treason case
- Publication date: 2019
- Publication place: Pakistan
- English publication date: 19 December 2019

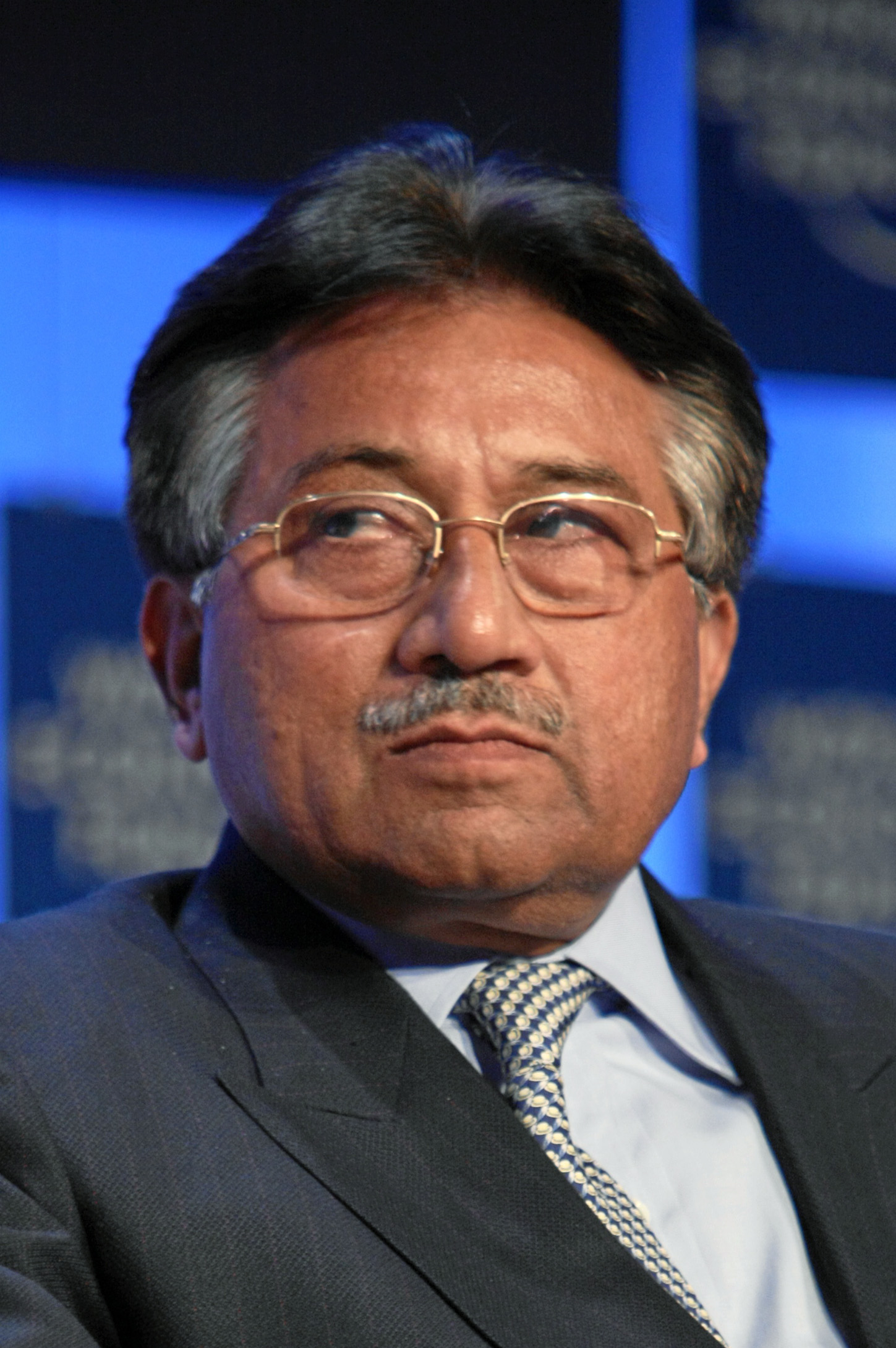
General Musharraf who was sentenced to death and further directed Pakistan's law enforcement agencies to arrest and execute Musharraf and if they are unable to do that and Musharraf dies due to some other cause then they should drag his body to D-Chowk in Islamabad and hang it for three days in front of Parliament building.

Para 66 is a paragraph numbered 66 in the verdict issued in Musharraf high treason case. It described an unusual way of posthumous punishment for Pervez Musharraf. It gained notoriety in Pakistani media and press due to its unusual content.

== Content ==
Paragraph authored by Waqar Ahmed Seth directed Pakistan's law enforcement agencies to arrest and execute Musharraf and if they are unable to do that and Musharraf dies due to some other cause then they should drag his body to D-Chowk in Islamabad and hang it for three days in front of Parliament building. The other judge Shahid Karim who agreed with overall verdict disagreed with the content of paragraph 66.

Due to the fact that no other judge agreed with this paragraph, it is considered an opinionated note of Seth and thus not enforceable.

== Reaction ==
The content and the author of para 66 was widely criticized by all sections of Pakistani society.

- Pakistan Army:
  - Asif Ghafoor: Ghafoor issued veiled threats against judges stating that this is a plot against the country and Armed Forces and Armed Forces know how to defend their dignity and honour. We know where our enemies are externally and internally and who is working on behalf of the enemy. We have a plan to encounter and eradicate our enemies.
- Government of Pakistan:
  - Shehzad Akbar: Akbar, a minister in Government of Imran Khan said that the author of this paragraph or whoever directed it to be included in judgement cannot be a friend of the nation or a patriotic Pakistani. He said that the government will file a reference against Seth is Supreme Judicial Council for his removal.
  - Farogh Naseem: Naseem called the language of the paragraph "despicable", "inhumane", and "unethical". He announced that the government will file a reference in Supreme Judicial Council requesting removal of Seth from judiciary. He also said that the judge is "mentally unfit" and does not have the mental capacity to serve in superior judiciary.
  - Firdous Ashiq Awan: She stated that the judgement of which this paragraph is part, is a plot against the country and Pakistani military.
- Opposition:
  - Bilawal Bhutto Zardari: Bhutto Zardari described the para as personal opinion of the judge.
