= Musarrat Jabeen =

Member of the Provincial Assembly of Sindh (2024–2029)

- مسرت جبیں

Member of the Provincial Assembly of Sindh
- Constituency: Reserved seat for women

Personal details
- Party: Muttahida Qaumi Movement – Pakistan

Musarrat Jabeen (Urdu: مسرت جبیں) is a Pakistani politician who is member of the Provincial Assembly of Sindh.

== Political career ==
Musarrat was allotted a reserved seat for women in Provincial Assembly of Sindh after the 2024 Sindh provincial election as part of the reserved quota for Muttahida Qaumi Movement – Pakistan.

On 13 May 2024, the Election Commission of Pakistan (ECP) suspended her membership as a member of the Provincial Assembly of the Sindh. This action followed a Supreme Court of Pakistan decision to suspend the verdict of the Peshawar High Court, which had denied the allocation of a reserved seat to the PTI-Sunni Ittehad Council bloc.
