= Bsroo Jee =

Member of the Provincial Assembly of Punjab (2024–2029)

- بصرو جی

Member of the Provincial Assembly of Punjab
- Constituency: Reserved seat for minorities

Personal details
- Party: Pakistan People’s Party Parliamentarians

Bsroo Jee (Urdu: بصرو جی) is a Pakistani politician who is member of the Provincial Assembly of Punjab.

== Political career ==
Bsroo Jee was allotted a reserved seat for minorities in Provincial Assembly of Punjab after the 2024 Punjab provincial election as part of the reserved quota for Pakistan People’s Party Parliamentarians.

On 13 May 2024, the Election Commission of Pakistan (ECP) suspended his membership as a member of the Provincial Assembly of the Punjab. This action followed a Supreme Court of Pakistan decision to suspend the verdict of the Peshawar High Court, which had denied the allocation of a reserved seat to the PTI-Sunni Ittehad Council bloc.
