= Chaudhary Waseem Anjum Sandhu =

Pakistani politician

- چوہدری وسیم انجم سندھو

Member of the Provincial Assembly of Punjab
- Constituency: Reserved seat for minorities

Personal details
- Party: Pakistan Muslim League (N)

Chaudhary Waseem Anjum Sandhu (Urdu: چوہدری وسیم انجم سندھو) is a Pakistani politician who is member of the Provincial Assembly of Punjab.

== Political career ==
Sandhu was allotted a reserved seat for minorities in Provincial Assembly of Punjab after 2024 Punjab provincial election as part of the reserved quota for Pakistan Muslim League (N).

On 13 May 2024, the Election Commission of Pakistan (ECP) suspended his membership as a member of the Provincial Assembly of the Punjab. This action followed a Supreme Court of Pakistan decision to suspend the verdict of the Peshawar High Court, which had denied the allocation of a reserved seat to the PTI-Sunni Ittehad Council bloc.
