= Musharraf high treason case =

High treason case involving Pervez Musharraf

Federation of Pakistan v. General (R) Pervez Musharraf
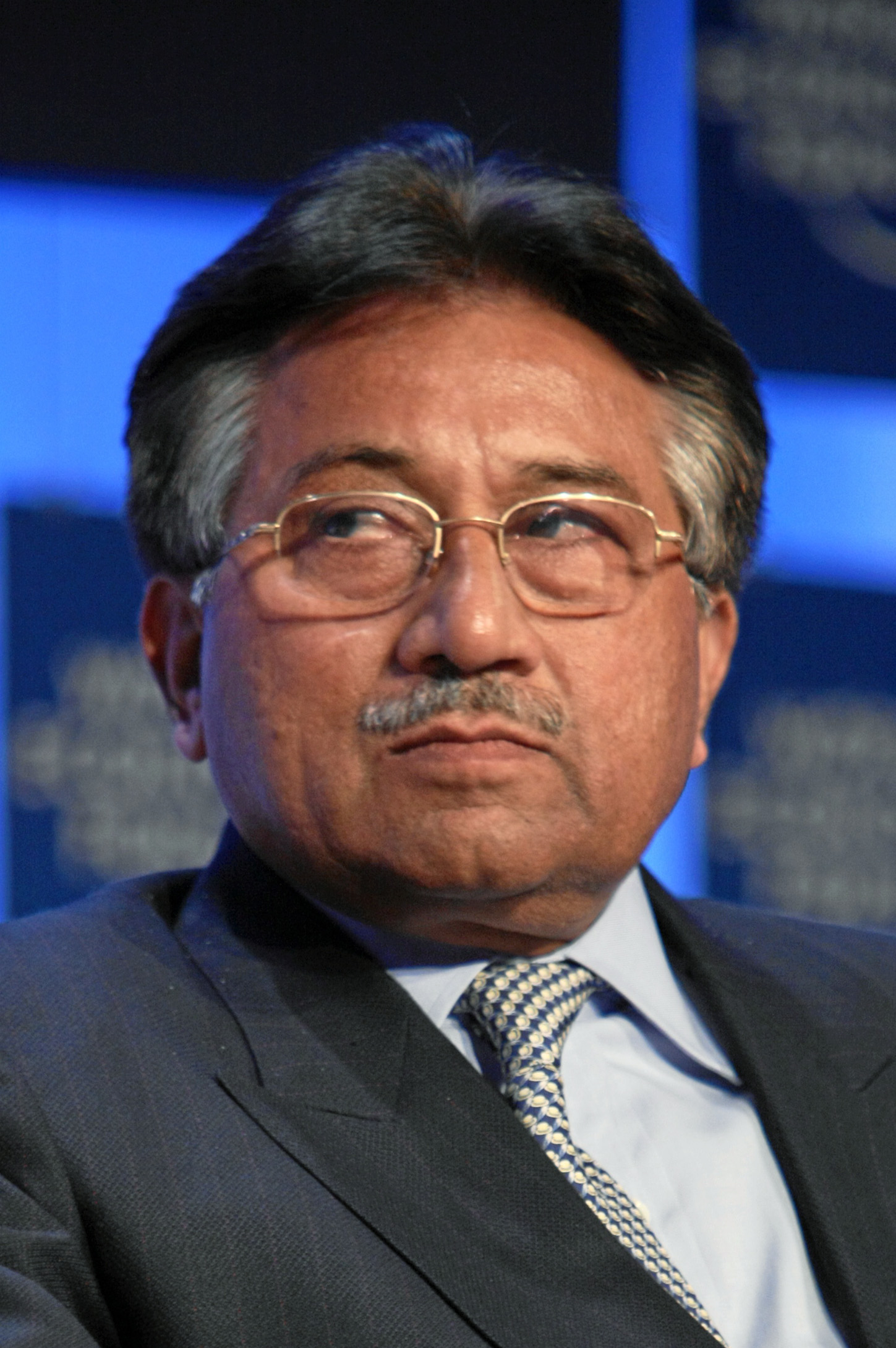
- Court: Special Court of Islamabad
- Decided: December 17, 2019
- Transcript: Detailed verdict

Court membership
- Judges sitting: Waqar Ahmed Seth; Nazar Akbar; Shahid Karim

Case opinions
- Decision by: Waqar Ahmed Seth
- Concurrence: Shahid Karim
- Dissent: Nazar Akbar

The Federation of Pakistan v. General (R) Pervez Musharraf, informally known as the Musharraf high treason case, was a court case, in which General Pervez Musharraf who acted in the capacity as chief of army staff, was tried for high treason stemming from his imposition of unconstitutional state of emergency on 3 November 2007. In this act, Gen. Musharraf, who was also elected as President of Pakistan, subverted and suspended the writ of the Constitution of Pakistan, dismissing the fifteen justices of the Supreme Court of Pakistan and the fifty-six judges of the provincial High Courts while issuing arrest orders to Chief Justice of Pakistan.

Against this state of emergency, the Supreme Court's registrar filed a lawsuit against the Executive Branch by nominating the president and an army chief as defendant, making the first in Pakistan's political history in which a president and an army chief was to stand in a trial for a treason. A special court formed by the Supreme Court to enquire the events of state of emergency with three judges composed from the Peshawar High Court, Sindh High Court, Lahore High Court, found Gen. Musharraf guilty of high treason, and thereby condemning the defendant to a death sentence.

On 13 January 2020, the Lahore High Court three member bench headed by Mazahar Ali Akbar Naqvi annulled the death sentence.

The Supreme Court of Pakistan after hearing an appeal against the Lahore High Court's verdict held in early 2024 that the Lahore High Court's judgment was in sheer violation of the judgments and orders of the Supreme Court, and that the High Court's flawed order was set aside for being without jurisdiction and unconstitutional.

On 10 January 2024, the appeal being heard by the Supreme Court of Pakistan was also dismissed and held that the conviction against deceased Pervez Musharraf by the Special Court subsisted.

Consequently, the Supreme Court's ruling declared Pervez Musharraf as having committed high treason, and upheld his conviction for abrogating the Constitution of Pakistan.

== Background ==
On 31 July 2009, a 14-judge bench of the Supreme Court of Pakistan declared Gen Pervez Musharraf's action of declaring emergency in November 2007, as illegal and unconstitutional in the PCO Judges case's verdict.

On 5 April 2013, the Supreme Court accepted a petition filed against Musharraf that accused him of committing treason under Article 6 of the Constitution. A three-member bench headed by Chief Justice Iftikhar Muhammad Chaudhry was constituted to begin hearing the case from 8 April 2013. However, on 7 April 2013, the CJP Iftikhar Chaudhry recused himself from the bench hearing the petition. On 8 April 2013, a two-member bench led by Justice Jawwad S. Khawaja summoned Musharraf and ordered that his name be put on the Exit Control List (ECL).

On 24 June 2013, in the National Assembly of Pakistan, the-then Prime Minister Nawaz Sharif said that his government intends to file a written request before the Supreme Court to put Musharraf on trial for treason under Article 6 of the Constitution. On 18 November 2013, the Supreme Court accepted the Sharif government's request [in the request 23 of PMLN legislatures were absent] to set up a Special Court to try Musharraf under Section 2 of the High Treason (Punishment) Act 1973 of the constitution. On 19 November 2013, Sharif approved the names of SHC Justice Faisal Arab, BHC Justice Tahira Safdar and LHC Justice Muhammad Yawar Ali for the Special Court set up under Section 4 of the Criminal Law Amendment (Special Courts) Act 1976.

== Case progression ==
On 12 December 2013, the Sharif government submitted an 11-page complaint carrying five charges of high treason against Musharraf for his trial in the Special Court. On 13 December 2013, the Special Court convened its first meeting at Federal Shariat Court and summoned Musharraf to appear before it on 24 December 2013.

On 2 January 2014, Musharraf was taken to the Armed Forces Institute of Cardiology (AFIC) in Rawalpindi while on the way to the special court. On 7 January 2014, the AFIC submitted a medical report to the special court stating that Musharraf was suffering from triple-vessel coronary artery disease.

On 18 February 2014, Musharraf finally appeared in court after avoiding twenty-two consecutive hearings, but no charges were framed against him. On 21 February 2014, the court dismissed Musharraf's plea that had challenged the special court's jurisdiction and had asked that his treason trial be held at a military court. On 31 March 2014, Musharraf was indicted for high treason charges.

In March 2016, Musharraf via his counsel moved an application before the Supreme Court seeking one-time permission to go abroad for medical treatment. On 16 March 2016, the Supreme Court upheld a 2014 SHC ruling that ordered the removal of Musharraf's name from the ECL. Subsequently, on 18 March 2016, Musharraf left the country for Dubai, United Arab Emirates. On 11 May 2016, the special court declared Musharraf an absconder in the treason case for his failure to appear before the court even after multiple summons.

On 19 November 2019, the special court reserved its verdict in the high treason case. On 5 December 2019, the special court said that it would announce the verdict in the high treason case against Musharraf on 17 December 2019.

== Verdict ==
On 17 December 2019, the special court found Musharraf guilty of high treason and sentenced him to death under Article 6 of the Constitution in a 2–1 split verdict. On 19 December 2019, the special court released the 169-page detailed verdict authored by PHC CJ Waqar Ahmed Seth with a dissenting note from Justice Nazar Akbar.

Musharraf had filed a petition in the High court challenging the judgement delivered by the high court. On 13 January 2020, the Lahore High Court annulled the death sentence calling the special court that held the trial as unconstitutional. The court also stated that the case was not framed as per the law. The unanimous verdict was delivered by a three membered full bench consisting of the judges Justice Mazahar Ali Akbar, Justice Muhammad Ameer Bhatti and Justice Chaudhry Masood Jahangir. The verdict given by the special court was called void by the lawyers. Musharraf's political party responded to the verdict stating "supremacy of the law and Constitution has been established".

== See also ==
- Pakistani state of emergency, 2007
- PCO Judges case
