= Hamid Ali Mirza =

Pakistani judge (1940–2017)

Hamid Ali Mirza (Urdu: حامد علی مرزا)

Chief Election Commissioner of Pakistan
- In office 17 March 2009 – 2012
- President: Pervez Musharraf; Asif Ali Zardari

Personal details
- Born: 14 September 1940 Jacobabad, Sindh, Pakistan
- Died: 23 October 2017 (aged 77) Karachi, Sindh, Pakistan
- Education: University of Sindh, Jamshoro
- Profession: Justice of the Supreme Court of Pakistan; Chief Election Commissioner of Pakistan

Hamid Ali Mirza (Urdu: حامد علی مرزا) (14 September 1940 — 23 October 2017) was a Pakistani jurist, who served as a Judge of the Supreme Court of Pakistan and Chief Election Commissioner of Pakistan.

== Education ==
Hamid Ali Mirza was born on 14 September 1940 in Jacobabad, Sindh, Pakistan. He passed matriculation examination from Jacobabad in 1954 and earned degrees of BSc and LLB in 1959 and 1961 respectively from the University of Sindh.

== Professional history ==
=== Lawyer ===
He started his practice as an advocate (Lawyer) in 1961 until he joined the Judicial Service in 1973.

=== Judicial service ===
- Senior Civil Judge and Assistant Sessions

He joined the Provincial Judicial Service on 10 December 1973 as Senior Civil Judge and Assistant Sessions Judge and served in this capacity for almost eight years.

- District and Session Judge

He was promoted as District and Session Judge on 26 January 1983 and he served in this capacity for over twelve years.

- Judge, High Court of Sindh

On 10 April 1995 he was elevated as a Judge of the High Court of Sindh. In addition to his duties as Judge, he also remained as Member Syndicate, University of Sindh, Jamshoro.

- Judge, Supreme Court of Pakistan

On 28 April 2000 he was elevated to Judge of the Supreme Court of Pakistan. He retired in 2005.

- Chief Election Commissioner of Pakistan

He was appointed Chief Election Commissioner of Pakistan on 17 March 2009. As a Member of the Election Commission of Pakistan, he participated in the Workshop for Commonwealth Chief Electoral Officers held in Dhaka, Bangladesh from 7–10 April 1997.
