= Shaheen (Pakistani politician) =

Pakistani politician

Shaheen is a Pakistani politician who has been a Member of the National Assembly of Pakistan since 2024.

== Political career ==
In the 2024 Pakistani general election, she secured a seat in the National Assembly of Pakistan through a reserved quota for women as a candidate of Pakistan Muslim League (N) (PML).

On 13 May 2024, the Election Commission of Pakistan (ECP) suspended the membership of Shaheen as a member of the National Assembly. This action followed a Supreme Court of Pakistan decision to suspend the verdict of the Peshawar High Court, which had denied the allocation of a reserved seat to the PTI-Sunni Ittehad Council bloc.
