= Muhammad Ameer Bhatti =

51st Chief Justice of the Lahore High Court

- محمد امیر بھٹی

51st Chief Justice of the Lahore High Court
- In office 7 July 2021 – 7 March 2024
- Preceded by: Muhammad Qasim Khan
- Succeeded by: Malik Shehzad Ahmed Khan

Justice of the Lahore High Court
- In office 12 May 2011 – 7 March 2024

Personal details
- Born: 8 March 1962 (age 64) Burewala, Punjab, Pakistan

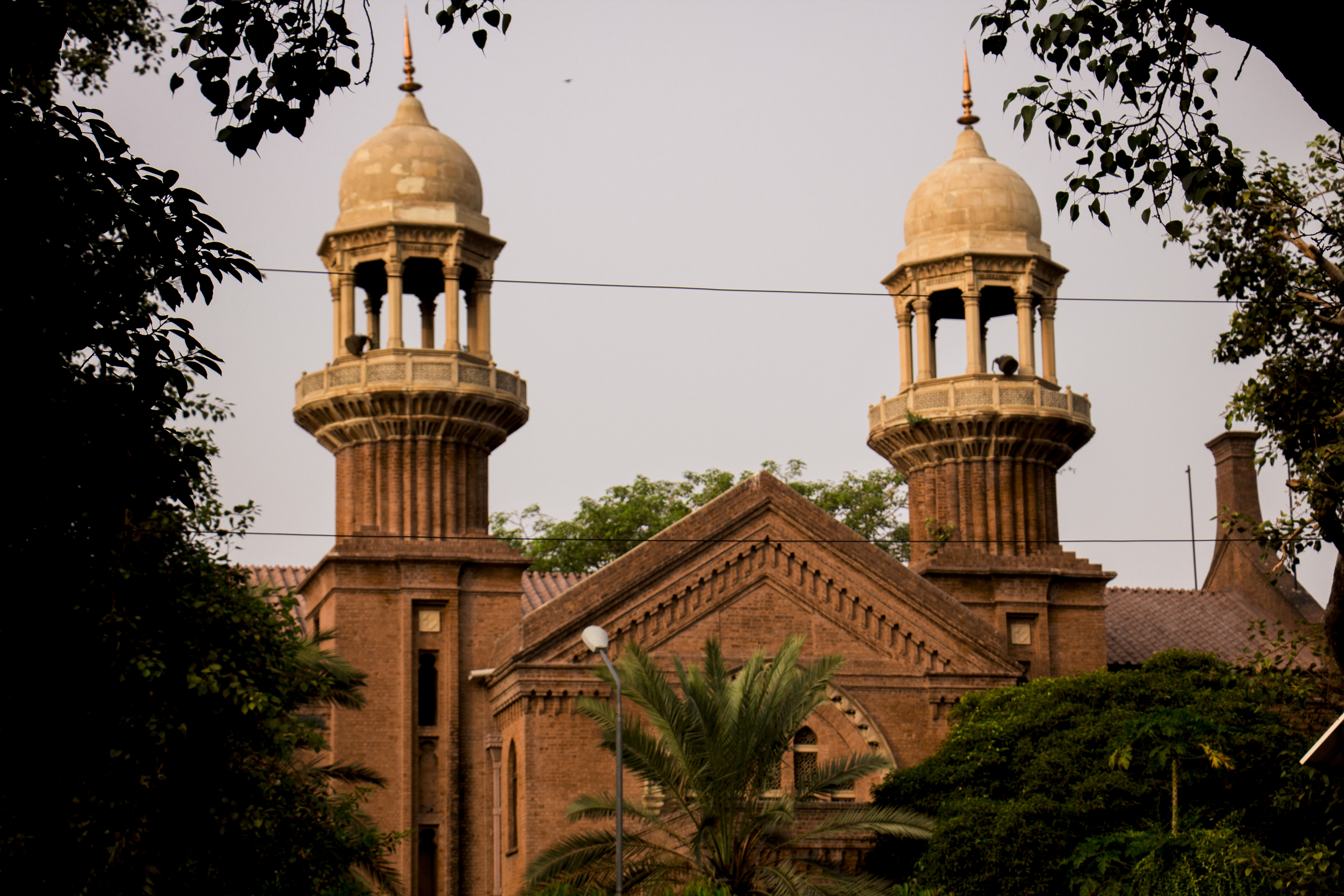
Lahore High Court

Muhammad Ameer Bhatti (Urdu: محمد امیر بھٹی; born 8 March 1962) is a Pakistani jurist who served as the 51st Chief Justice of the Lahore High Court from 7 July 2021 to 7 March 2024.

He became a judge of the Lahore High Court on 12 May 2011 and served until 7 March 2024.

== Career ==
Ameer Bhatti has been a practicing lawyer at Lahore High Court (Multan Bench) for more than 35 years. He was elevated as Justice of the Lahore High Court on 12 May 2011.

== Pervez Musharraf High Treason Case ==
Against the state of emergency imposed in 2007, the Supreme Court of Pakistan registrar filed a lawsuit against the Executive Branch by nominating former President and army chief Pervez Musharraf as accused, marking the first instance in Pakistan's history of a president and an army chief standing trial for treason. A special court formed by the Supreme Court to enquire the events of state of emergency with three judges composed from the Peshawar High Court, Sindh High Court, Lahore High Court, found Gen. Musharraf guilty of high treason, and thereby condemning the defended to sentenced him to death.

On 10 January 2024, the appeal being heard by the Supreme Court of Pakistan against the Special Court's verdict was dismissed, and the apex court annulled and set aside the Lahore High Court's legally flawed verdict. The Supreme Court of Pakistan held in 2024 that the Lahore High Court’s judgment was in sheer violation of the judgments and orders of the Supreme Court, the Lahore High Court's illegal order was set aside for being without jurisdiction and unconstitutional.

The Supreme Court of Pakistan held that the conviction against dictator Pervez Musharraf by the Special Court subsisted. Consequently, the Supreme Court's ruling declared dictator Musharraf as having committed high treason, and upheld the traitor's conviction for abrogating the constitution.
