= Qaiser Rashid Khan =

Pakistani jurist of the Peshawar High Court (1961–2024)

- قیصر رشید خان

Chief Justice of Peshawar High Court
- In office 9 January 2021 – 31 March 2023
- Preceded by: Waqar Ahmed Seth
- Succeeded by: Musarrat Hilali

Acting Chief Justice of Peshawar High Court
- In office 16 November 2020 – 9 January 2021

Senior Justice of Peshawar High Court
- In office 28 June 2018 – 16 November 2020
- Preceded by: Waqar Ahmed Seth
- Succeeded by: Roohul Amin Khan

Justice of Peshawar High Court
- In office 2 August 2011 – 31 March 2023

Personal details
- Born: 31 March 1961 Thana, Malakand District, West Pakistan, Pakistan
- Died: 2 January 2024 (aged 62)
- Education: Islamia College University (F.Sc); Khyber Law College (Law degree); University of Peshawar Political Science (MA); University of Peshawar Journalism (MA)

Qaiser Rashid Khan (31 March 1961 – 2 January 2024) was a Pakistani jurist and the chief justice of Peshawar High Court from 9 January 2021 to 31 March 2023. Born in Thana, Malakand, Khan earned his law degree from Khyber Law College and his Master of Arts degrees in Political Science and Journalism from the University of Peshawar before beginning his career in law. His tenure at the Peshawar High Court began in 2011, and he subsequently held various positions, including Senior Justice and Acting Chief Justice, before his death in 2024.

== Early life and education ==
Qaiser Rashid Khan was born on 31 March 1961 in Thana, Malakand. Khan received his secondary education from Cadet College Kohat in 1976. He did his F.Sc. from Islamia College University in 1978 and graduated in 1981. He earned his law degree from Khyber Law College in 1984 and his Master of Arts degree in political science from the University of Peshawar in 1987 and a Master of Arts degree in journalism from the same university in 1991.

== Career ==
Justice Khan was a judge of the Peshawar High Court from 2 August 2011. He served as the senior justice of Peshawar High Court from 28 June 2018 until 16 November 2020. He was appointed the acting chief justice of Peshawar High Court on 16 November 2020 and served until his retirement on 31 March 2023. He had taken oath as the chief justice of Peshawar High Court on 9 January 2021.

== Death ==
Khan died from complications of a stroke on 2 January 2024, at the age of 62.
