= Gunyar Thana Malakand =

Coordinates: 34°36′25.5″N 72°03′54.9″E

Gunyar
- Village
- Interactive map of Gunyar
- Time zone: UTC+5 (PST)
- Area code: Area code 946

Gunyar or Gul-e-Anaar (Means a Flower of Pomegranate) is a village near Thana, Malakand district, Pakistan. The residents of the village consist mostly of Madey-Khel Miagaan (the ancestors of Madey Baba and Serai Baba). The nearby villages of Gunyar are Thana, Chapai, Maizara, Aladhand Dherai and Nalu. Most of the people of this village also live in Karachi (In Karachi, the population of Gunyari people is greater than in Gunyar village), U.A.E, Saudi Arabia, Qatar and England.

== Medieval history ==
Odigram near Barikot 25 kilometer northeast of Gunyar was the capital of the ancient Swati tribes which was overrun by Alexander in 327BC. The Greek warrior could not establish any durable rule but disturbed the region that called for intervention by the Indian Maurya Empire in 305 BC. Gandhara civilization had flourished under the Kushan Dynasty. Monuments of the Hindu Shahi the likes of Shingardar Stupa (Gunbad) given below is standing tall in the foot hill of Kumbazara forest and other archaeological ruins at Zangal Cheena and Manray Tangay. The Muslim period in the history of Swat had started with excursions of Mahmud Ghaznavi (1001) and the Shaheedan strategically located at the two entrance routes Palosi Shaheedan and the Mutepatay Shaheedan are reminders of that period.

== Contemporary history ==
The patriarch saint and warrior Madhay Baba is known to have come to Swat along with Babar’s troops led by Mirza Balakh Baig in 1519 (the date Babar married Bibi Mubarika daughter of Shah Mansur). He had three sons, namely; Mian Saleh, Mian Syed and Mian Peer Dad. They supported the Yousafzai chieftain Malik Ahmad Khan forces in their struggle for occupation of Swat against Tanoli and Gabar tribes. The grave of Mian Saleh Baba is at Mura Hill and Mian Syed Baba is at Maizara.Shah Mansur a cousin of Malik Ahmad and a prominent leader of the Yousafzai was a follower of Mian Peer Dad and was given endowment of coveted property near Landaki popularly known “Shah Mansur” during the land distribution among the Yousafzai clans (1525-1535) and was given the title “Sarai Baba”. This was the property that the Khan Khel of Thana claimed during 1942-1946 but lost the bid because Quazi Mohammad Yousaf assisted by Sultan Mahmud produced evidence of Madhay Khel ownership in the court of Kenneth Pickman, political Agent Malakand (1942-1944).

== Organizations ==
=== Gunyar Youth Welfare Association (1984) ===
Projects undertook; Social Development (Health & Education); Environment related projects; Livestock Improvement Projects; Seed Production & Distribution Projects; Infrastructure development Project (Bridges; roads & streets): Interaction with International Agencies & Government of Pakistan. Primary School for Boys was built in 1957 and was upgraded to, Middle School in 1993. Primary School for Girls was established in 1988 and was upgraded to Middle School in 2004. The Association trained one of the local girls at the Polyclinic Hospital, Islamabad in nursing and a Basic Health Unit was established in the Community Center where Child & Women Health was profiled. A Handicraft center for women was also established to train young ladies in sewing & knitting. The nurse is now appointed by the Health Department as a Lady Health Visitor for Gunyar and the surrounding villages. The Gunyar Youth planted 100 hectare Community Reserved Forest in line with the objectives of National Conservation Strategy in 1986. The Youth Welfare Association successfully formed a farmers group and initiated a tube-well irrigation project that increased productivity by 10 folds. A farmer described his newfound wealth by saying, 'previously I owned a donkey, now I have a Suzuki Jeep".
