= Sardar Fakhre Alam =

Pakistani jurist (1929–2013)

Sardar Fakhre Alam (1929 – 8 January 2013) was a Pakistani jurist who served as the Chief Justice of the Peshawar High Court from 1987 to 1991 and later as a Chief Election Commissioner of Pakistan. He briefly served as the judge of the Federal Sharia Court from October 1984 to November 1984.
