= Roohul Amin Khan =

Chief Justice of Peshawar High Court
- In office 31 March 2023 – 31 March 2023
- Preceded by: Qaiser Rashid Khan
- Succeeded by: Musarrat Hilali

Senior Justice of Peshawar High Court
- In office 16 November 2020 – 30 March 2023
- Preceded by: Qaiser Rashid Khan

Justice of Peshawar High Court
- In office 20 July 2012 – 31 March 2023

Personal details
- Born: 1 April 1961 (age 65)

Rooh ul Amin Khan (born 1 April 1961) is a retired Pakistani judge and a former Chief Justice of Peshawar High Court.

== Career ==
Khan assumed charge as a judge of the Peshawar High Court on 20 July 2012. He became senior justice of the aforementioned court on 16 November 2020.
