= Waqar Ahmed Khan (judge) =

Justice of the Peshawar High Court

- وقار احمد خان

Justice of the Peshawar High Court
- Incumbent
- Assumed office 19 August 2019

Personal details
- Born: 20 March 1974 (age 52)
- Education: LL.B

Waqar Ahmed Khan (Urdu: وقار احمد خان, born 20 March 1974) is a Pakistani jurist who has bene serving as a judge of the Peshawar High Court (PHC) since 19 August 2019.

== Career ==
Khan was appointed as a civil judge in 1999. He resigned in 2005 to pursue a career in legal practice. He became an advocate of the high court in 2006. Initially serving as an additional advocate general (AAG) in the first Pakistan Tehreek-e-Insaf (PTI) government of Khyber Pakhtunkhwa in 2013, he resumed the AAG role after the formation of the second PTI government in 2018. He represented the government in various cases.

Appointed as an additional judge in the PHC on 19 August 2019, Khan officially took the oath as a confirmed judge of the PHC on 5 August 2021.

== Cases ==
He participated in the bench that, on 27 August 2022, halted the Khyber Pakhtunkhwa cabinet's notification, which had granted a Dera Ismail Khan official the authority to file cases against Pakistan Democratic Movement (PDM) leaders – Nawaz Sharif, Shehbaz Sharif, Maryam Nawaz, and Fazlur Rehman – on charges of spreading hate against state institutions. This decision was made during the tenure of the PTI-led government of Mahmood Khan in Khyber Pakhtunkhwa.

On 2 December 2023, he was part of the bench that issued an order for the issuance of Pakistan Origin Cards to Afghan spouses of Pakistanis.
