= Shujaat Ali Khan =

Justice of the Lahore High Court
- In office 27 March 2012 – 22 April 2026

Personal details
- Born: 23 April 1964 (age 62)

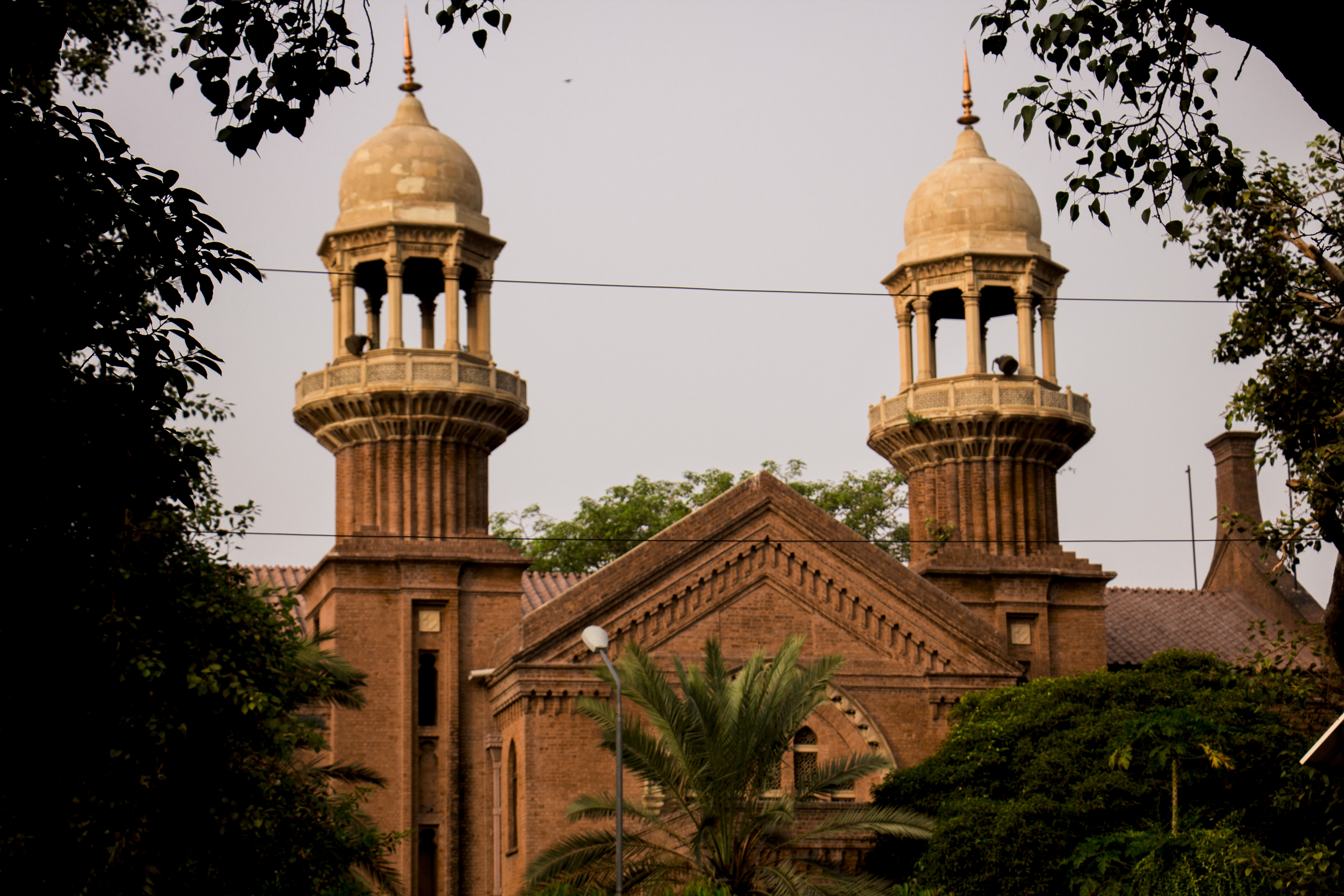
Lahore High Court

Shujaat Ali Khan (born 23 April 1964) is a former judge of the Lahore High Court from 27 March 2012 until 22 April 2026.

Justice Khan served as the acting Chief Justice of the Lahore High Court from June 25, 2024, till July 11, 2024, while the process to appoint a permanent Chief Justice was underway following the elevation of the previous Chief Justice, Malik Shehzad Ahmed Khan, to the Supreme Court of Pakistan.

Justice Khan was superseded and was not appointed as Chief Justice because he was not found to be suitable and fit for consideration to hold the office of the chief justice largely due to the negative public perception regarding his integrity and reputation amongst the judicial and legal fraternity.
