= Dost Muhammad Khan (judge) =

Pakistani politician

Dost Muhammad Khan دوست محمد خان
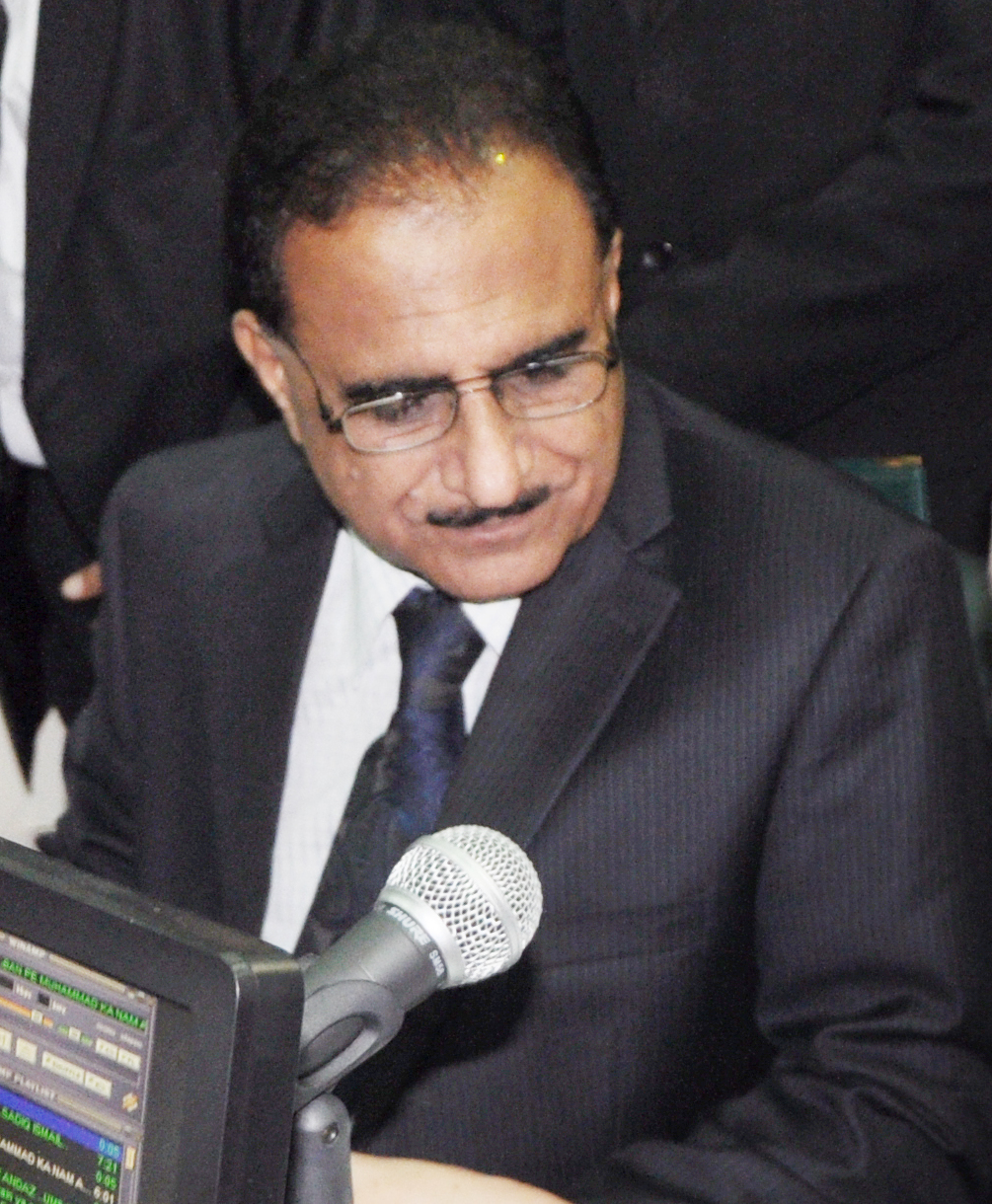
- Dost Muhammad Khan in 2014

Chief Minister of Khyber Pakhtunkhwa (Caretaker)
- In office 6 June 2018 – 16 August 2018
- Governor: Iqbal Zafar Jhagra
- Preceded by: Pervez Khattak
- Succeeded by: Mahmood Khan

Justice of the Supreme Court of Pakistan
- In office 1 February 2014 – 20 March 2018
- Nominated by: Mamnoon Hussain

Chief Justice of Peshawar High Court
- In office 17 November 2011 – 31 January 2014
- Nominated by: Asif Ali Zardari
- Preceded by: Ijaz Afzal Khan
- Succeeded by: Mian Fasihul Mulk

Justice Peshawar High Court
- In office 10 September 2003 – 16 November 2011

Personal details
- Born: 20 March 1953 (age 73) Bannu, Khyber Pakhtunkhwa, Pakistan

Dost Muhammad Khan (Urdu: دوست محمد خان Pashto: دوست محمد خان) (born 20 March 1953) is a Pakistani jurist who remained a senior justice of the Supreme Court of Pakistan from 1 February 2014 to 20 March 2018. Previously, he served as Chief Justice of the Peshawar High Court from 17 November 2011 to 31 January 2014. He refused to take oath under the Provisional Constitutional Order (PCO) 3 November 2007 and rejected many offers.

As Chief Justice of Peshawar High Court and a judge of the Supreme Court, Justice D.M. Khan's judicial interpretation has been described as nationalist and moderate leanings when he delivered several major judgments: terming drone strikes as "war crimes" and ordering the government to raise the issue at the UN; a lifelong disqualification of former president Pervez Musharraf from contesting elections; declaring fuel adjustment charges illegal; taking suo motu notice of women being barred from voting and ordering missing persons be shifted to internment centers. His other achievements include establishment of an alternative dispute resolution (ADR) system, an online complaint system and mobile courts.

On 5 June 2018, Dost Muhammad Khan was appointed as caretaker Chief Minister of Khyber Pakhtunkhwa and he assumed office the following day.

== Early life and education ==
Khan was born on 20 March 1953 in Bannu District of Khyber Pakhtunkhwa. He received his early education from Government High School No. 1, Bannu. He graduated from the Government Post Graduate College, Bannu in 1974 and obtained law degree from Government Sindh Muslim Law College, Karachi in 1976.

In June 2008, he attended the Course "on Reducing Delay in Justice, Administration of Justice and Court Management" held by RIPA International, London, United Kingdom. He also attended Conference at Washington, D.C. on sharing of Judicial Experience on Intellectual Property Rights & International Commercial Arbitration held in October–November 2010.

== Professional career ==
Khan began his career as a lawyer in 1976 and served in lower and high courts as well as the Supreme Court of Pakistan. He remained President of District Bar Association, Bannu from 1986–87 and President of Peshawar High Court Bar Association D.I. Khan Bench from 1999-2000.

== Judicial career ==
Khan was appointed as additional judge on 10 September 2002. He was elevated as permanent Judge of the Peshawar High Court on 10 September 2003 and took oath as Chief Justice of the Peshawar High Court on 17 November 2011, where he served for two years and two months, before being elevated to the Supreme Court of Pakistan on 31 January 2014.

During his tenure as Chief Justice of Peshawar High Court, he delivered several major judgments including; terming drone strikes ‘war crimes’, a lifelong disqualification of former president Pervez Musharraf from contesting elections; declaring fuel adjustment charges illegal; taking suo motu notice of women being barred from voting and ordering missing persons be shifted to internment centers.

== Achievements ==
Khan took initiatives for the provision of "speedy justice". Mobile courts were established to resolve petty civil disputes and criminal cases at the earliest and at the involved parties’ doorsteps. Alternative dispute resolution (ADR) center was established at the Khyber Pakhtunkhwa Judicial Academy for criminal and civil cases pending in courts. The E-citizens Grievances Redressal System was introduced at the PHC’s Human Rights Directorate on 13 January 2014 to enable citizens to file their complaints without having to visit the PHC.

== See also ==
- Peshawar High Court
- Supreme Court of Pakistan

Legal offices
Preceded by Ejaz Afzal Khan	Chief Justice of Peshawar High Court; 17 November 2011 – 31 January 2014	Succeeded by Mian Fasihul Mulk
Political offices
Preceded by Pervez Khattak	Chief Minister of Khyber Pakhtunkhwa (Caretaker); 6 June 2018 – 16 August 2018	Succeeded by Mahmood Khan
