= PCO Judges case =

Supreme Court of Pakistan case

Constitution Petition No. 8 & 9 of 2009
- Court: Supreme Court of Pakistan
- Decided: 31 July 2009
- Citations: (Supreme Court of Pakistan 31 July 2009), Text.

Court membership
- Judges sitting: Chief Justice Iftikhar Muhammad Chaudhry; Javed Iqbal; Sardar Muhammad Raza Khan; Khalil-ur-Rehman Ramday; Mian Shakirullah Jan; Tassaduq Hussain Jillani; Nasir-ul-Mulk; Raja Fayyaz Ahmed; Chaudhry Ijaz Ahmed; Ghulam Rabbani; Sarmad Jalal Osmany; Muhammad Sair Ali; Mahmood Akhtar Shahid Siddiqui; Jawwad S. Khawaja

Case opinions
- All steps taken in the 2007 Pakistani state of emergency are unconstitutional, going against the restraining order imposed by the Supreme Court immediately after the state of emergency was declared.

The Provisional Constitutional Order Judges case (shortened to PCO Judges case) refers to cases heard and decided by the Pakistan Supreme Court pertaining to the High Court and Supreme Court judges who took their oath of offices under the Provisional Constitutional Order in 2007. On 3 November 2007, then-President Pervez Musharraf declared a state of emergency under a Provisional Constitutional Order (PCO) and suspended the Constitution of Pakistan. Under this emergency law, all High Court and Supreme Court judges were asked to take a fresh oath under the PCO. Those who did not were placed under effective house arrest and . A seven-member bench issued a restraining order on the same day, barring the government from implementing emergency rule and urging other government officials to not facilitate associated illegal actions.

The Provisional Constitutional Order Judges case has been examining the constitutionality and legality of the steps taken by Musharraf in declaring a state of emergency, and considering contempt of court charges against justices who took oath under the Provisional Constitutional Order in violation of the restraining order.

== Background ==
On 3 November 2007, Musharraf declared a Provisional Constitutional Order, which suspended the Constitution of Pakistan and declared a state of emergency. High court judges were asked to take oath under the new Provisional Court Order. Approximately 100 judges refused to take this oath, and were placed under house arrest. Chief Justice Iftikhar Chaudhry was one of these judges. He was dismissed and replaced by Chief Justice Dogar. On 3 November 2007, a restraining order was issued by a seven-member bench of the Supreme Court to bar the government from implementing emergency rule. In a statement smuggled out of Chaudhry's residence, Chaudry said:

The whole of the judiciary of Pakistan is struggling for the supremacy of the constitution. The Provisional Constitutional Order (PCO) issued by General Musharraf has been declared a step to interfere in the independence of the judiciary, and therefore a judicial 'restraining' order against it had been issued by a seven-member bench of the Supreme Court, which has to be respected and enforced.

Any action by the government after the passing of this order is illegal, including the detention of lawyers and members of civil society whose only sin is that they opposed the emergency and the PCO. Up to 13 justices of the Supreme Court of Pakistan have refused to take an oath under the PCO. Yesterday morning, the judges of the Supreme Court were stopped as they sought to carry out their judicial duty, including the hearing of a case by the full court regarding the PCO, about which the restraining order had been passed.

This order has been passed and those who defy it, defy the constitution. I and all the judges of the Supreme Court were exercising our jurisdiction in accordance with the law and constitution and are determined to do so in the future.

Dogar almost immediately declared void Chaudry's ruling that the emergency state and Provisional Constitutional Order were unconstitutional.

== Case ==
=== July 2009 ===
In July 2009, the then-Lahore High Court Chief Justice Khawaja Muhammad Sharif referred to the Supreme Judicial Council of Pakistan a list of names of justices who took oath under the 2007 Provisional Constitutional Order, stating that doing so went against the restraining order issued on 3 November 2007. By taking this oath, the judges swore to abide by the 2007 Proclamation of Emergency, the 2007 Provisional Constitutional Order No. 1, and the Code of Conduct established by the Supreme Judicial Council. This referral caused the Supreme Court to first decide it could begin contempt of court charges against many of the higher court justices who took the oath. It also caused President Asif Ali Zardari to issue orders declaring that the 76 judges that had taken the oath would no longer hold office until the decision on 31 July 2009. These judges were spread throughout the Pakistan Supreme Court, Lahore High Court, Sindh High Court, Peshawar High Court, and the Islamabad High Court.

=== After 31 July 2009 verdict ===
Justices Muhammad Ahsan Bhoon and Anwaarul Haq Pannun filed petitions to review the 31 July 2009 verdict. The two justices' complaints included:

- They had not been heard before being condemned
- They had taken oath, but did not take oath under the Provisional Constitutional Order.
- Dogar had taken oath, along with four other judges, which violated the 3 November 2007 restraining order
- This violation made both his appointment and all appointments by his recommendation unconstitutional
- Dogar had taken oath as Chief Justice while another Chief Justice was in office
- The decision was retroactive to the 3 November 2007 Provisional Constitutional Order, but not to that of the 1999 Pakistani coup d'état
- There were those who took oath under the Provisional Constitutional Order who were not being prosecuted
- The judgement did not follow Article 209 of the Constitution, which says that judges must refrain from deciding cases involving their own interests
- The oath administered by Dogar to President Zardari should not be considered to be valid if the oaths administered to other judges are not

After the 31 July decision, contempt of court notices were issued to the judges who took the Provisional Constitutional Order oath. On 9 November 2010, a four-member Supreme Court bench took up the contempt of court charges against the nine justices who have not apologised for taking the oath. Although these judges petitioned the Supreme Court, the Supreme Court rejected the petitions and will go on with the contempt of court proceedings. Objections to the composition of the bench were raised by Justice Abdul Baist against the presence of Justices Sair Ali, Tariq Pervez, and Shahid Siddiqui. Following these objections, Ali refused to be part of the bench and requested Chaudhry create a new bench to hear the case. On 11 December 2010, Dogar also challenged the bench presiding over the case, on the grounds that two of the judges making up the bench had been appointed per his recommendation. However, this challenge was rejected. On 3 March 2011, Dogar and Zahid Hussain apologised to the Supreme Court. Chaudhry accepted their apologies. The Supreme Court has asked Attorney General Maulvi Anwar ul Haq to provide a statement on behalf of the government detailing the legal status of the judges who took the oath.

The Supreme Court has supposedly also issued contempt of court notices to Musharraf, former premier Shaukat Aziz, the former corps commanders, and the current Chief of Army Staff Ashfaq Parvez Kayani. However, this has been denied by Supreme Court Bar Association of Pakistan president Asma Jahangir. She blames this mistake on the media for misinterpreting the Court's decision.

== Decisions ==
=== 31 July 2009 ===
On 31 July 2009, after hearing constitutional petitions concerning PCO judges, the appointment of judges, and the steps taken in declaring the 2007 Pakistani state of emergency, the Pakistan Supreme Court decided the declaration of emergency rule by Musharraf to be unconstitutional under Article 279 of the Constitution of Pakistan. The Supreme Court also declared the steps taken in declaring the state of emergency to be null and void, and specifically stated that the removal of judges was unconstitutional and illegal. This included the removal from office of the Chaudhry and other justices. The appointment of Dogar and of all justices between 3 November 2007 and 24 March 2008 was deemed unconstitutional. Musharraf's increase to the number of justices, accomplished through a finance bill, was declared unconstitutional, and the number of justices was set at seventeen. The verdict did not change the legality of the new government, nor that of the presidential oath taken by Zardari. The verdict also referred the issue of the Provisional Constitutional Order judges to the Supreme Judicial Council.

== Reaction ==
=== 31 July 2009 verdict ===
The 31 July 2009 verdict was warmly received outside of the Supreme Court and across Pakistan. Candy was distributed after the announcement, and people were chanting slogans in support of the decision. The verdict was also welcomed by the spokesperson to Zardari, Farhatullah Babar, who said that "The Supreme Court short order today declaring the November 3, 2007 actions of General Pervez Musharraf as unconstitutional is a triumph of the democratic principles, a stinging negation of dictatorship and is most welcome." Jahangir, president of the Supreme Court Bar Association, spoke out strongly against the issuance of contempt of court notices to the judges, saying that the Supreme Judicial Council, not the Supreme Court, should not be hearing the case. Jahangir was subsequently asked by the Supreme Court Bar Association to keep from issuing statements on the matter, and to not suggest that her personal opinion reflected the opinion of the Supreme Court Bar Association.

== See also ==
- Pakistani state of emergency, 2007
- 1999 Pakistani coup d'état
- Provisional Constitutional Order
- Supreme Court of Pakistan
- President of Pakistan
