= Sahibzada Asadullah =

Justice of the Peshawar High Court

- صاحبزادہ اسد ﷲ

Justice of the Peshawar High Court
- Incumbent
- Assumed office 19 August 2019

Personal details
- Born: 16 April 1972 (age 54) Swabi District
- Education: Master's degree (English literature); LL.B
- Alma mater: Nisar Shaheed College, Risalpur (Intermediate)

Sahibzada Asadullah (Urdu: صاحبزادہ اسد ﷲ, born 16 April 1972), is a Pakistani jurist serving as a Justice of the Peshawar High Court (PHC) since 19 August 2019.

== Early life and education ==
Born on 16 April 1972, in Swabi District, Asadullah completed his secondary school examination in 1989 and his intermediate examination from Nisar Shaheed College, Risalpur, in 1991.

He earned a master's degree in English Literature and later passed the LL.B examination in 1999.

== Career ==
In October 2012, he became an enrolled advocate of the Supreme Court of Pakistan (SCP). Proficient in criminal jurisprudence and constitutional matters, he gained recognition as a prominent lawyer in Khyber Pakhtunkhwa, handling various cases, notably criminal cases in the PHC and SCP.

His involvement in over 40 reported cases across different law journals showcased his expertise.

Initially appointed as an additional judge in the PHC on 19 August 2019, Asadullah took the oath as a confirmed judge of the PHC on 5 August 2021.

== Verdicts ==
Asadullah was part of a bench that overturned the conviction of an individual in a murder case related to honor, specifically the killing of his daughter. The bench issued orders for the acquittal of the accused, who had received a life sentence from a trial court earlier.
