= Chief Election Commissioner of Pakistan =

Pakistani public servant

- Emblem of the Election Commission of Pakistan
- Incumbent; Sikander Sultan Raja since 27 January 2020
- Election Commission of Pakistan
- Seat: Constitution Avenue, Islamabad
- Nominator: Prime Minister of Pakistan and Leader of the Opposition
- Appointer: President of Pakistan
- Term length: 5 Years
- Formation: March 25, 1956; 70 years ago
- First holder: F.M. Khan
- Website: Election Commission of Pakistan

The chief election commissioner is the authority and the appointed chair of the Election Commission of Pakistan— an institution constitutionally empowered to conduct free and fair elections to the national and provincial legislatures.

Before 1973, the commissioners were only appointed from the civil services cadre and appointments came from the president. After the promulgation of much and thoroughly reformed constitution in 1973 in shape of 18th Amendment, the constitutional provisions made mandatory and compulsory that appointments would only come from the judicature branch's judges who were eligible to become chief election commissioner, however later on an amendment to the Constitution allowed civil servants to be appointed to the post as well. The Constitution (or president on different occasions) lays the appointment and oath administered by the chief justice of Pakistan.

== Appointment of the chief election commissioner ==
The president of Pakistan appoints the chief election commissioner and four members of the Election Commission of Pakistan. The prime minister and leader of the opposition in the National Assembly recommend three names for appointment of CEC and for each member to a parliamentary committee for hearing and confirmation of any one person against each post. The parliamentary committee consisting of 12 members is constituted by the speaker of the National Assembly comprising 50% members from treasury benches and 50% from opposition parties out of which one-third shall be from Senate, the chief election commissioner has a tenure of 5 years. The chief election commissioner enjoys the same official status as available to judges of the Supreme Court of Pakistan. The chief election commissioner can be removed by the president of Pakistan or the Supreme Court of Pakistan or through impeachment in National Assembly of Pakistan. In the wake of the current election commissioner, Sikandar Sultan Raja's decision on March 22, 2023, to postpone the provincial elections, giving reasons, despite the Supreme Court's orders to conduct them on time, may result in his impeachment. A legal case is filed by the opposition party, Pakistan Tehrik-e-Insaf (PTI), in the Supreme court requesting the current election commissioner's impeachment under Article 6 of the Constitution of the country and appealed to direct ECP to conduct the elections on time, as per the earlier ruling of the supreme court.

== Duties and functions ==
Under the Constitution of Pakistan the chief election commissioner has the following powers and duties:

- Preparing electoral rolls for elections to the National Assembly and provincial assemblies and revising such rolls annually.
- To organise and conduct election to the Senate and fill casual vacancies in a House or a Provincial Assembly.
- Appointment of election tribunals.
- A commissioner also hears and decides cases of disqualification of members of Parliament and provincial assemblies. And receipt of reference from the chairman or the speaker or head of the political party, as the case may be.
- To hold and conduct election to the office of the president as per Second Schedule to the Constitution of the Islamic Republic of Pakistan
- To hold referendum as and when ordered by the president.
- To make rules providing for the appointment of officers and servants to be employed in connection with the functions of the chief election commissioner or an Election Commission and for their terms and conditions of employment. Under this power the Honorable Chief Election Commissioner framed the Election Commission (Officers & Servants) Rules, 1989

== List of former chief election commissioners of Pakistan ==
The following is the list of former chief election commissioners of Pakistan:

No.	Name	Tenure start	Tenure end	Ref.
1	F.M. Khan	March 1956	April 1962	
2	Akhter Hussain	April 1962	October 1964	
3	G. Moinuddin Khan	October 1964	December 1967	
4	N. A. Farooq	December 1967	April 1969	
5	Justice Abdus Sattar	April 1969	January 1971	
6	Justice Wahiduddin Ahmad	January 1971	October 1973	
7	Justice Sajjad Ahmad Jan	October 1973	July 1978	
8	Justice Dorab Patel	July 1978	September 1979	
9	Justice Maulvi Mushtaq Hussain	September 1979	May 1980	
10	Justice Karam Illahi Chohan	May 1980	March 1982	
11	Justice S.A. Nusrat	March 1982	April 1988	
12	Justice Naeemuddin	April 1988	July 1993	
13	Justice Sardar Fakhre Alam	July 1993	February 1997	
14	Justice Mukhtiar Ahmad Junejo	February 1997	March 1999	
15	Justice A.Q. Chaudry	March 1999	January 2002	
16	Justice Irshad Hasan Khan	January 2002	January 2005	
17	Justice Qazi Muhammad Qazi Muhammad Farooq	March 2006	March 2009	
18	Justice Hamid Mirza	March 2009	July 2012	
19	Justice Fakhruddin G. Ebrahim	July 2012	July 2013	
20	Justice Sardar Muhammad Raza Khan	December 2014	December 2019	
21	Sikandar Sultan Raja	January 2020		

Note: A very small number of chief election commissioners have enjoyed their stipulated three-year term in office. The majority has either served for a shorter term or for extended tenures which were as long as seven years.
