= Qazi Muhammad Farooq =

Pakistani judge (born 1938)

Qazi Muhammad Farooq (born 6 January 1938- 27th Match 2026) was a Pakistani jurist who served on the Supreme Court of Pakistan.

Farooq was previously the Chief Election Commissioner of the Election Commission of Pakistan.

== Early years ==
Born in Abbottabad, Farooq attended the Government Denny's High School in Rawalpindi, where he passed the Matriculation Examination in 1954. He then attended Government Gordon College, graduating in 1958. Farooq obtained his Bachelor of Laws degree from Punjab University Law College, Lahore in 1960.

== Lower courts ==
After getting his law degree, Farooq practiced as a private lawyer for seven years in Abbottabad. In 1967, he joined the Provincial Civil Service (Judicial Branch), working as Civil Judge at Charsadda, Lakki Marwat, Bannu and as Senior Civil Judge, Mardan.

In July 1976, Farooq was promoted to District and Sessions Judge in July 1974, serving at Haripur, Abbottabad and Mansehra. In April, 1977, he participated in 28th advanced Course in Public administration and Development at the National Institute of Public Administration in Lahore;

In April 1977, Farooq was assigned to Mansehra, Bannu and Peshawar. During this period, he attended the 1st advanced Course in Shariah in the Institute of Shariah and Legal Profession, Islamabad as also the 1st advanced Course in Shariah in the Islamic University, Madina Munawara. Farooq was promoted to B.P.S. 20 in August 1982; appointed Provincial Election Commissioner, N.W.F.P. in September, 1982;

== Peshawar High Court ==
Farooq was repatriated to Judiciary in January, 1988 and posted as Registrar, Peshawar High Court; during this period, he participated in the International Visitor Programme administration of Courts in the United States arranged by the United States Information agency. Farooq also attended the LAWASIA Trial Court administrators Conference held in Singapore in April 1989

Farooq was elevated to the Peshawar High Court on 29 September 1991. He visited Iran in 1992 as a member of the Supreme Court Delegation and attended a course on alternate Dispute Resolution in San Francisco (U.S.A) in July 1998. Farooq was appointed as Chief Justice Peshawar High Court on 12 May 1999 and retired on 5 January 2000.

== Supreme Court ==
Farooq was appointed as Judge of the Supreme Court of Pakistan on 4 February 2000. During this period, he remained a member of the Law Reforms Commission, Judge-in-charge, Federal Judicial academy, Islamabad; Farooq visited the People's Republic of China as a member of the Supreme Court Delegation and participated in the Australian Educators Forum held in Philippines on February 11–14, 2003.

Farooq retired from the Supreme Court on 31 December 2003.

Farooq was appointed to the Law and Justice Commission of Pakistan and Chairman, Committee of administration, al-Mizan Foundation in August 2005.

== See also ==
- Election Commission of Pakistan
