= Syed Muhammad Attique Shah =

Justice of the Peshawar High Court

SM Attique Shah

Justice of the Peshawar High Court
- Incumbent
- Assumed office 27 March 2017

Personal details
- Born: 12 October 1968 (age 58)
- Education: University of Peshawar

Syed Muhammad Attique Shah (born 12 October 1968) is a Pakistani jurist who has been serving as a judge of the Peshawar High Court (PHC) since 27 March 2017.

== Early life and education ==
Shah earned his LLB from the University of Peshawar's Faculty of Law between 1991 and 1993.

== Legal career ==
Shah began his legal career as an advocate in the district courts of Pakistan on 23 September 1993. He became an advocate of the PHC on 12 October 1995 and of the Supreme Court of Pakistan on 10 May 2008. He served as the president of the District Bar Association and the general secretary of the Peshawar High Court Bar Association from 2002 to 2003. He was a member of the Khyber Pakhtunkhwa Bar Council in 2004 and held the position of president of the Peshawar High Court Bar Association multiple times in 2006–07, 2009–10, and 2010–11. Additionally, he served as the additional attorney general of Pakistan from 26 July 2013 to 27 March 2017. Shah has expertise in various fields of law, including constitutional law, civil law, criminal law, and corporate law.

== Judicial career ==
Shah was appointed as a justice of the Peshawar High Court on 27 March 2017. He has served as the administrative judge of the banking court, the special court for offenses in banking, the special courts for customs, taxation, and anti-smuggling, the special courts for control of narcotics substances, and the consumer courts. He has also been the chairman of the subordinate justiciary service tribunal and a tribunal member for the election of the Senate of Pakistan (General Seats, Khyber Pakhtunkhwa). Additionally, he has presided over the Green Bench and has been a member of the ADR task force, the chairman of the information technology committee, and a member of the administration committee of the PHC.

In August 2024, he was appointed as a member of the Alternative Dispute Resolution (ADR) Task Force, which operates under the supervision of the Alternative Dispute Resolution Committee, reconstituted by the Chief Justice of Pakistan Qazi Faez Isa. The purpose of the committee was to enhance Pakistan's ADR framework by developing a legal, structural, and organizational framework for dispute resolution. As a member of the ADR Task Force, Shah played a role in ensuring the formulation and implementation of laws related to ADR, along with facilitating the necessary infrastructure and training programs for legal professionals.
