= Naeem Anwar =

Justice of the Peshawar High Court

Muhammad Naeem Anwar
- محمد نعیم انور

Justice of the Peshawar High Court
- Incumbent
- Assumed office 19 August 2019

Personal details
- Born: 15 June 1972 (age 54) Mansehra District

Muhammad Naeem Anwar (Urdu: محمد نعیم انور, born 15 June 1972) is a Pakistani jurist who has been serving as a judge of the Peshawar High Court (PHC) since 19 August 2019.

== Career ==
He obtained the license to practice law in lower courts in 1999 and for the high court and Supreme Court of Pakistan in 2001 and 2014, respectively.

Initially appointed as an additional judge in the PHC on 19 August 2019, Anwar was sworn in as a confirmed judge of the PHC on 5 August 2021.

Anwar was designated for the PHC's Mingora appellate tribunal branch for the 2024 Pakistani general election and the 2024 Khyber Pakhtunkhwa provincial election. This tribunal was established to hear appeals against the acceptance or rejection of candidate nomination papers by returning officers.

== Verdicts ==
He was part of the bench that raised concerns about students, including small children, carrying heavy bags. In April 2019, they directed the Government of Khyber Pakhtunkhwa to establish and enforce a law within four months to establish weight limits for schoolbags.

He participated in the bench that, on 11 July 2020, mandated the immediate release of military court convicts. The decision was based on the belief that these individuals hadn't received a fair trial or the opportunity to defend themselves, having been convicted primarily on confessional statements.
