= Syed Arshad Ali =

Justice of the Peshawar High Court

Justice of the Peshawar High Court
- Incumbent
- Assumed office 16 June 2017

Personal details
- Born: 10 April 1971 (age 55) Swabi District

Syed Arshad Ali (born 10 April 1971) is a Pakistani jurist who has been a judge of the Peshawar High Court since 16 June 2017.

== Early life and education ==
Ali was born in Swabi District on 10 April 1971. He got his LLB degree from Khyber Law College, affiliated with the University of Peshawar, in 1993.

== Judicial career ==
He registered as an advocate of High Court in 1996. Until 2007, he worked with "Afridi, Shah and Minallah", a law firm located in Peshawar. Later, he started his own firm in Peshawar and named it "Syed Arshad Ali and Associates". In 2012, he started practicing as an advocate of Supreme Court. He became Supreme Court Bar Association's member for life. He remained member Peshawar High Court Bar Association and member of Peshawar Bar Association, District Courts. As an advocate, he specialized representing banks, hospitals, and universities. He joined Peshawar High Court (PHC) as an additional judge on 16 June 2017. He became permanent member of the PHC bench on 31 May 2019.
