= Malik Shehzad Ahmed Khan =

Justice of the Supreme Court of Pakistan

Malik Shahzad Ahmed Khan

Justice of the Supreme Court of Pakistan
- Incumbent
- Assumed office 25 June 2024

Chief Justice of the Lahore High Court
- In office 8 March 2024 – 24 June 2024
- Preceded by: Muhammad Ameer Bhatti
- Succeeded by: Aalia Neelum

Senior Justice of the Lahore High Court
- In office 1 December 2022 – 7 March 2024
- Preceded by: Muhammad Ameer Bhatti
- Succeeded by: Shujaat Ali Khan

Justice of the Lahore High Court
- In office 12 May 2011 – 24 June 2024

Acting Chief Justice of the Lahore High Court
- In office 30 June 2022 – 30 July 2022

Personal details
- Born: 25 March 1963 (age 63) Pindigheb, Attock District

Malik Shahzad Ahmed Khan (born 25 March 1963) is a Pakistani jurist who has been serving as a judge of the Supreme Court of Pakistan since 25 June 2024. He previously served as a judge of the Lahore High Court (LHC) from 12 May 2011 to 24 June 2024, and as Chief Justice of the LHC from 8 March 2024 to 24 June 2024.

He had also served as the acting LHC Chief Justice in 2022.
