= Ghulam Safdar Shah =

Pakistani jurist

Chief Justice of the Peshawar High Court
- In office 25 May 1972 – 31 October 1976
- Preceded by: Bashir-ud-Din Ahmad Khan
- Succeeded by: Abdul Hakim Khan

Personal details
- Profession: Jurist

Ghulam Safdar Shah was a Pakistani jurist who served as chief justice of the Peshawar High Court and later as a justice of the Supreme Court of Pakistan.

== Judicial career ==
Shah became chief justice of the Peshawar High Court on 25 May 1972 and remained in office until 31 October 1976.

He later served on the Supreme Court of Pakistan. In 1978 and 1979, he was among the judges who heard Zulfikar Ali Bhutto's appeal and review petition in the murder case arising from the killing of Nawab Mohammad Ahmad Khan Kasuri.

After Bhutto's review petition was rejected, Shah spoke to a BBC correspondent and gave the impression that he would have accepted parts of the defence argument. The military government then initiated proceedings against him and the Supreme Judicial Council took up a reference against him, and he resigned as a judge of the Supreme Court in October 1980.
