= Arshad Malik (judge) =

Pakistani judge (died 2020)

Muhammad Arshad Malik

Personal details
- Born: Rawalpindi, Pakistan
- Died: 4 December 2020 Rawalpindi, Pakistan
- Occupation: Judge

Muhammad Arshad Malik was the former judge of accountability court in Pakistan. He sentenced former Prime Minister Nawaz Sharif in Al-Azizia Steel Mills case. He was dismissed from service by Lahore High Court in 2020 over a videogate following the Nawaz Sharif's sentence in his court. He died due to COVID-19 on 4 December 2020.

== Early life and judicial career ==
Born in Rawalpindi, Malik joined judiciary as civil judge in August 2000. He was promoted to session judge in 2010. He was appointed in Accountability Court Islamabad-II in 2018 by Law Ministry of Pakistan.

During his judicial career he presided over many important cases. Former Prime Minister Nawaz Sharif was disqualified by Supreme Court of Pakistan in Panama case and corruption references were filed against him in accountability courts by National Accountability Bureau. In Arshad Malik's court he was sentenced to seven years prison in Al-Azizia reference while acquitting in Flagship reference.

== Video scandal ==
In July 2019 Maryam Nawaz released a video of Arshad Malik in press conference and claimed that his father's conviction was compromised and judge was blackmailed which was being confessed in video allegedly. Her claim led to inquiry against Malik and he was suspended and later removed from service by Lahore High Court in July 2020. He challenged the dismissal and his hearing was due in Lahore High Court.

== Death ==
He died on 4 June 2020 due to cardiac arrest and his son claims his father died due to cardiac arrest because of the pressure of sharif family.

== See also ==
- Waqar Ahmed Seth
