= Waqar Ahmed Seth =

Chief Justice of the Peshawar High Court (1961–2020)

- وقار احمد سیٹھ

Chief Justice of Peshawar High Court
- In office 28 June 2018 – 12 November 2020
- Succeeded by: Qaiser Rashid Khan

Justice of Peshawar High Court
- In office 2 August 2011 – 12 November 2020

Personal details
- Born: 16 March 1961 Dera Ismail Khan District, Khyber Pakhtunkhwa, Pakistan
- Died: 12 November 2020 (aged 59) Islamabad, Pakistan

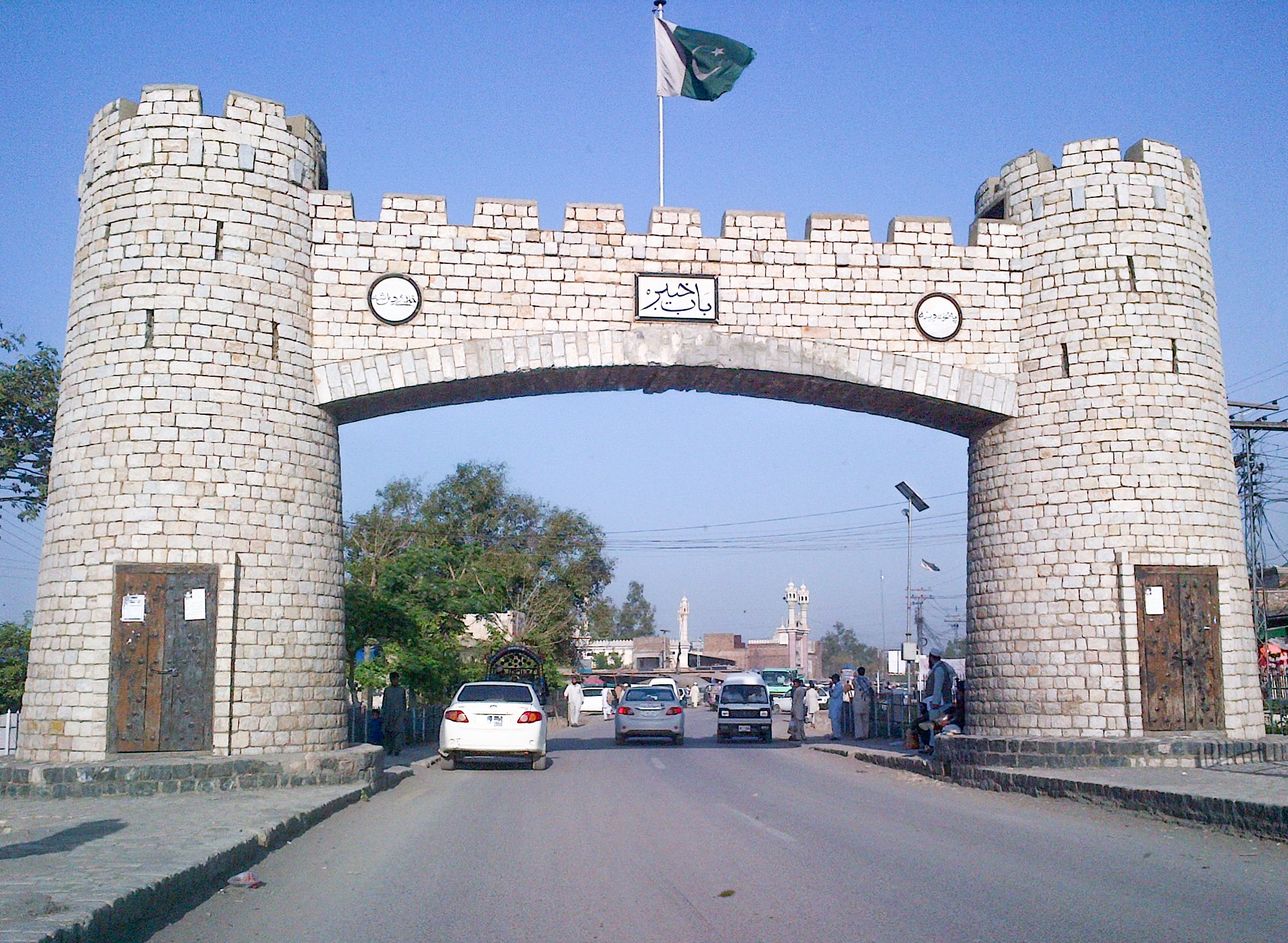
Symbol of Peshawar city

Waqar Ahmed Seth (16 March 1961 – 12 November 2020) was a Pakistani jurist who was the Chief Justice of Peshawar High Court between June 2018 and November 2020. He presided over the special court which heard the high treason case against former military ruler Pervez Musharraf and was the presiding judge of the three-member special court that convicted Musharraf of this crime and sentenced him to death in a controversial decision. That was the first time in Pakistan's history that a military dictator was convicted of high treason.

== Early life and education ==
Born in Dera Ismail Khan on 16 March 1961, he received his early education from Cantonment Public School, Peshawar. He was awarded a Higher Secondary School Certificate from the FG Inter College for Boys in 1977 and a Bachelor of Science degree from Islamia College, Peshawar in 1981. Seth was awarded an LLB from Khyber Law College, Peshawar in 1985 and an MA in political science from the University of Peshawar in 1986.

== Judicial career ==
Seth started his professional career in December 1985 when he was enrolled as an advocate in the lower courts. On 24 May 2008, he was enrolled as an advocate of the Supreme Court of Pakistan. His judicial career started on 2 August 2011, when he was elevated to the Peshawar High Court as an additional judge. In June 2018, he was appointed Chief Justice of Peshawar High Court.

Seth was inducted into the special court hearing the high treason case against Pervez Musharraf in October 2019 as the president of the court. On 17 December 2019, the three-member bench of this special court awarded death sentence to Musharraf in a short order. This short order was criticized by Director General of Inter-Services Public Relations of Pakistan military, General Asif Ghafoor. Ghafoor said in his statement that "there was pain and anguish among the rank and file of the military" due to this punishment and that Musharraf cannot be a traitor since he served his country for 40 years and fought wars for its defence. Later, the short order was criticized by government ministers associated with Pakistan Tehreek-e-Insaf, most prominently by Firdous Ashiq Awan and attorney general Anwar Mansoor Khan.

The special court issued a 169-page detailed order on 19 December 2019. He was widely criticized by government ministers and legislators associated with Pakistan Tehreek-e-Insaf for his opinionated note about giving an exemplary punishment to Musharraf. Seth wrote in paragraph 66 of the judgement that law enforcement agencies of Pakistan should arrest and hang Musharraf till death and if somehow he is able to evade this punishment and dies before the punishment then his body should be dragged and hanged for three days in D-Chowk of Islamabad in front of the Parliament building. The reasons he gave for this posthumous punishment were Musharraf's persistent and stubborn delaying tactics to avoid facing the court and ultimately the punishment. The judge also directed to bring all those to justice who were responsible to help Musharraf flee from the country.

After the judgement, the Director General of Inter-Services Public Relations, General Asif Ghafoor issued veiled threats aimed at the judges who decided to punish Musharraf suggesting that they are enemy of the country and Pakistan Military knows how to defend its honour and dignity. Taking the cue from the General, three ministers belonging to Pakistan Tehreek-e-Insaf Government appeared in a press conference and announced that the government had decided to file a reference against Seth in Supreme Judicial Council for his removal from judiciary. During the conference, Firdous Ashiq Awan, Farogh Naseem, and Shehzad Akbar hurled insults at the judge. Awan described him as working for the enemy, called his verdict as a plot against armed forces and the country, Naseem said that the judge is mentally unfit and lacks mental capacity, and Akbar said that "whosoever wrote the Para 66 cannot be friend of the nation".

In November 2018, Seth as part of two member bench of Peshawar High Court reversed sentences of military courts against 74 convicts, 50 of whom had been sentenced to death. That decision by Seth was used by this same government as an example in International Court of Justice (ICJ) to stress that courts in Pakistan are independent to operate without any influence from government or military. This helped Pakistan's case against Indian national Kulbhushan Jadhav as ICJ noted the verdict by Seth as the reason for their verdict to not reverse Yadav's death sentence as Seth's verdict established that decisions by military courts can be reviewed in Pakistan's superior judiciary thus Yadav is also free to file a review petition.

== Death ==
Seth tested positive for coronavirus on 22 October 2020, and was admitted to a local hospital of Peshawar. He died of coronavirus infection on 12 November 2020.

== See also ==
- Arshad Malik (judge)
