= Shahid Karim =

Justice of the Lahore High Court

Justice of the Lahore High Court
- In office 7 November 2014 – 19 August 2026

Personal details
- Born: 20 August 1964 (age 62)

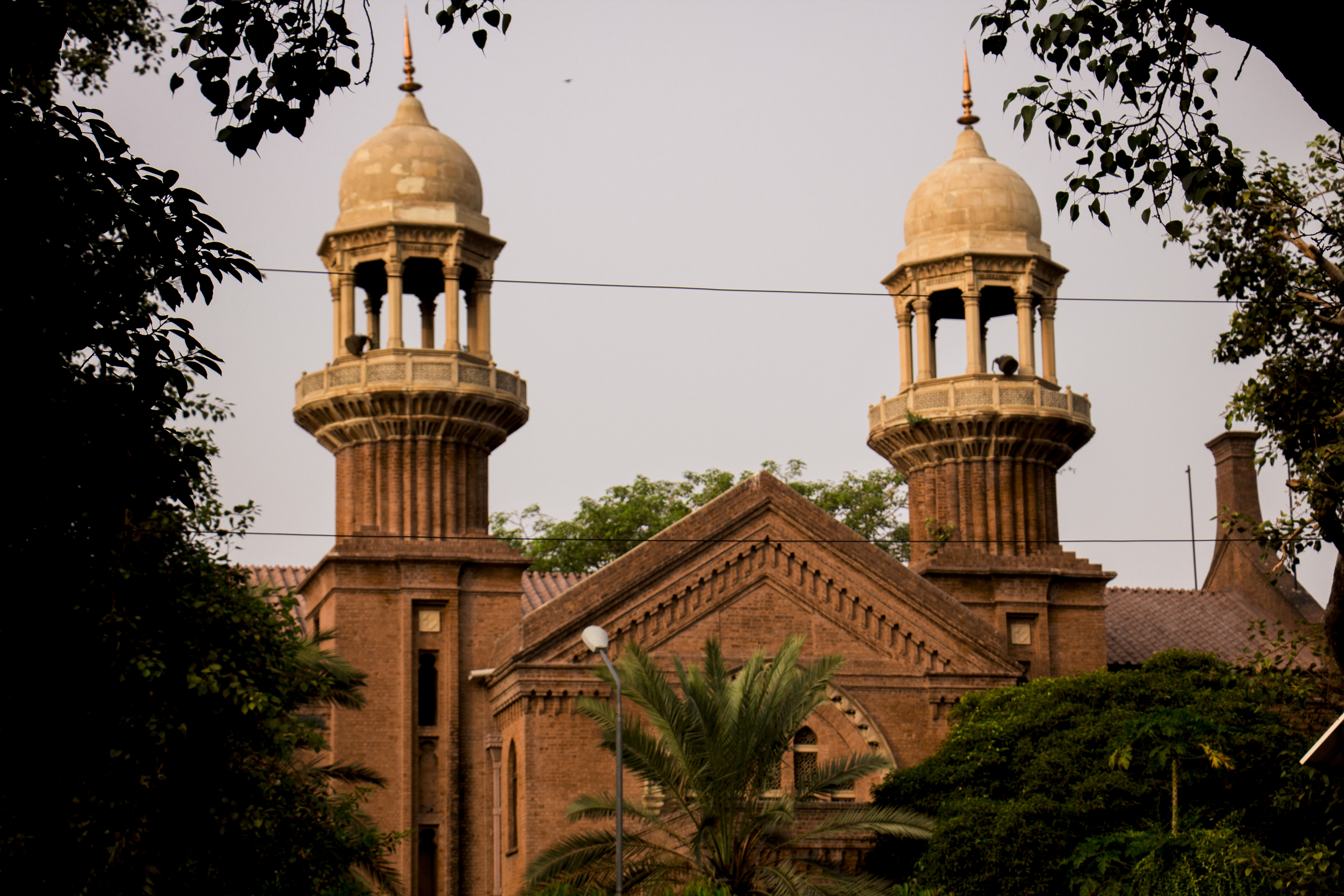
Lahore High Court

Shahid Karim (born 20 August 1964) is a Pakistani jurist who served as a judge of the Lahore High Court from 7 November 2014 until 19 August 2026.

He was part of the special court which heard the high treason case against Pervez Musharraf and one of the only two judges who convicted him for this crime and sentenced him to death. This was the first time in Pakistan's history that a military dictator was convicted for high treason. He disagreed with Para 66 of the verdict in which presiding judge Waqar Ahmed Seth directed law enforcement agencies to find Musharraf's body in case he dies without experiencing the punishment of hanging till death and drag his body to D-Chowk in Islamabad and hang it there for three days.
