= Farogh Naseem =

Pakistani politician

Mohammad Farogh Naseem
- فروغ نسیم

Federal Minister of Law
- In office 24 July 2020 – 2 April 2022
- President: Arif Alvi
- Prime Minister: Imran Khan
- Preceded by: Himself
- Succeeded by: Fawad Chaudhry
- In office 29 November 2019 – 1 June 2020
- President: Arif Alvi
- Prime Minister: Imran Khan
- Preceded by: Himself
- Succeeded by: Himself
- In office 20 August 2018 – 26 November 2019
- President: Mamnoon Hussain; Arif Alvi
- Preceded by: Syed Ali Zafar (caretaker)
- Succeeded by: Himself

Member of the Senate of Pakistan
- In office 12 March 2012 – 12 March 2024
- Constituency: Sindh

Personal details
- Born: June 26, 1960 (age 66) Karachi, Sindh, Pakistan
- Party: MQM-P (2018-present)
- Other political affiliations: MQM-L (2012-2018)

Mohammad Farogh Naseem (Urdu: محمد فروغ نسیم) is a Pakistani politician and barrister who served as the Federal Minister of Law and Justice until 2 April 2022. He is serving as member of the Senate of Pakistan. He has previously served as Advocate General of Sindh.

== Early life and education ==
He has completed his graduation in Bachelor of Laws (LLB) from the University of Wales, Master of Laws (LLM) from the London School of Economics and Doctor of Philosophy (PhD) in comparative constitutional law from the University of London.

== Political career ==
He was elected to the Senate of Pakistan from Sindh against technocrats seat on March 12, 2012. In March 2018, he was re-elected on general seat from Sindh.

On 20 August 2018, he was sworn in as Federal Minister of Law and Justice in the federal cabinet of Prime Minister Imran Khan.

He resigned on 26 November 2019, and presented his resignation in federal cabinet to represent the government in a case regarding Army Chief Gen Qamar Javed Bajwa's tenure extension in the Supreme Court.

On 29 November 2019, he was again sworn in as Federal Minister of Law and Justice in the federal cabinet of Prime Minister Imran Khan.

He resigned on 1 June 2020, and presented his resignation to Prime Minister Imran Khan to represent Federal Government regarding Justice Qazi Faez Isa's case in Supreme Court.

On 24 July 2020, he was again sworn in as Federal Minister of Law and Justice in the federal cabinet of Prime Minister Imran Khan for third time. Law Minister Farogh Naseem, who paid over Rs35 million, was the highest tax-paying member of the Senate in 2018.

== Family ==
His father, Mohammad Naseem (late), was also a practicing lawyer, and the late Justice M.B. Ahmad, an ICS officer who also served as the first secretary of the Constituent Assembly of Pakistan; before being elevated as a judge of the Sindh High Court, was his paternal uncle.
