= Capital punishment in Pakistan =

Capital punishment is a legal penalty in Pakistan. Although there have been numerous amendments to the Constitution, there is yet to be a provision prohibiting the death penalty as a punitive remedy.

A moratorium on executions was imposed in 2008. No executions occurred from 2009 to 2011, with 1 in 2012 and 0 in 2013. The moratorium was lifted fully after the massacre of 132 students and 9 members of staff of the Army Public School and Degree College in Peshawar, and routine executions resumed. Pakistan carried out 7 executions in 2014, 326 in 2015, 87 in 2016, 65 in 2017, and 14 in 2018. Hanging is the only legal method of execution.

== Legality by Constitution ==
The 1973 Constitution of Pakistan is divided into twelve parts, with 280 articles. This fundamental document asserts individual rights and protection, such as the status of women, the right to fair trial, and the right to life. Nevertheless, despite the fundamental right to life entrenched in its Constitution, the Court has jurisdiction to sentence a person to death. As part 6 of the Constitution gives the Court the right to find an individual guilty of any crimes punishable by death under the Penal Code (Act XLV of 1860), or any other relevant law.

Nevertheless, the Constitution contains a vivid preamble which states that Pakistan ought to follow and operate by Islamic laws and teaching. Whilst retaining the democratic principles entrenched in Article 1 of the Universal Declaration of Human Rights that all men are created equal, it is therefore held that they should be judged equally under national law The Constitution is a balance between two worlds, Islamic and non-Islamic. Article 31 of the Constitution talks about the ‘Islamic way of life’ meanwhile part 9 contains Islamic provisions.

== Islamic views on capital punishment ==
As an Islamic state, Pakistan legal system is informed by Islamic laws. The Qur'an 6:151 states "…take not life, which God has made sacred, except by way of justice and law. Thus, does He command you, so that you may learn wisdom" This scripture of the Qur'an, while it grants the right to life, also permits individuals' lives be taken only "by way of justice and law." Similarly, in the Prophetic tradition, it is narrated by `Abdullah ibn Masud that Muhammad said, "The blood of a Muslim who confesses that none has the right to be worshipped but Allah and that I am His Apostle, cannot be shed except in three cases: In Qisas for murder, a married person who commits illegal sexual intercourse and the one who reverts from Islam (apostate) and leaves the Muslims." (Sahih Bukhari 6878, Sahih Muslim 1676)

Many Muslims believe that capital punishment is a severe sentence that may be instructed by a court for crimes of sufficient severity. Murder is an example of a crime deemed a major violation of most religious doctrines, and is punishable by death in some countries, including Pakistan.

== Crimes punishable by death ==
The Pakistan Penal Code contains 27 different offences punishable by death, including blasphemy, rape, sexual intercourse outside of marriage, assault on the modesty of women, and smuggling of drugs. This Code draws its origin from the Indian Penal Code, after several amendments from different governments in Pakistan, the Code is now a mixture of Islamic and English law. This Code provides explanations, definition, and punishment for all type of offences.

Section 302 of the Code governs the punishment for murder, also known as Qatl-i-amd, which is then divided into three categories. The first dealing with death as qisas, this is the Islamic word meaning retribution, this permits the state to take one's life for murder, which is also known as equal retaliation, an eye for an eye type of law. The second type under section 302 is ta'zir, this is death or imprisonment, this word is an Islamic legal term referring to an offence punishable at the discretion of a judge or state. The third is any punishment of imprisonment. The Code also punishes any act of rape with death or imprisonment, not less than ten years depending on the ‘severity’ of the case.

Section 376 states that if and when the act of rape is committed by two or more individuals with common intention like gang rapes the criminals should meet the fate of death or life imprisonment.

Although in many countries insults or defamation of any religion such as Islam is not a crime, in Pakistan this is one of the biggest crimes one can commit. Blasphemy is deemed a crime not only under the Code but also under Islamic law. This is controversial, as many people believe that this should not be punishable as it violates the fundamental freedom of speech. The Code address the penalty and offences relating to religion under section 295B and C. Subsection B punishes any defamation made against the Holy Qur'an with life imprisonment. Whereas, punishment under subsection C is for any written or spoken words direct or indirect made to defile the ‘sacred name of Prophet Muhammad’ will be punished by death or life imprisonment. Other crimes punishable with death are those of Fasad fil-ardh, which is any offence of treason (this could be when one leaves Islam to join foreign faiths to combat Islam), homosexual acts (this is prohibited under Islamic laws and teachings) and piracy of any kind. Islam permits the death penalty for anyone who threatens to undermine authority or destabilize the state.

=== International law ===
One of the first international treaties to place limits on the death penalty was the 1929 Geneva Convention, this restricted death to prisoners of war taken in armed conflict. The ICCPR was adopted with the aim of restricting the death penalty only for ‘most serious crimes’ in accordance with states law. Although Article 6 of the ICCPR does not expressly prohibit capital punishment, the Human Rights Committee said its drafting ‘strongly suggests the abolition is desirable’. Despite the lack of such a mandatory requirement, the movement towards abolishing the death penalty worldwide has been increasing rapidly in the last sixty years, particularly since the United Nations Declaration of Human Rights. At the beginning of the 20th century, only Costa Rica, San Marino and Venezuela had permanently abolished the death penalty. At the current time, 133 countries have abolished the death penalty in law or in practice.

== Second optional protocol to ICCPR ==
The United Nations Economic and Social Council published the Safeguards Guaranteeing the Protection of the Rights of Those Facing the Death Penalty, attempted to define the meaning of ‘most serious crime’ in 1984. It asserts that such type of crimes should not go beyond international crimes with lethal or grave outcomes. However, as noted above every state has deferent views to what is a serious criminal offence for their nation.

== 2008-2014 moratorium ==
The Constitution of Pakistan empowers the President to pardon or remit convictions. The Pakistan Peoples Party government, whose former chairperson Benazir Bhutto was a well known opponent of the death penalty, came to power in March 2008, and installed its President, Asif Ali Zardari on 9 September 2008. Upon taking charge of the office, he issued an indefinite moratorium on executions. Between this time and December 2014, one person was executed. Muhammad Hussain, a soldier convicted of murdering his senior officer, was hanged at Central Jail Mianwali on 15 November 2012. Human rights activists said his case was likely an exception since he was convicted in a military court.

On 16 December 2014, after the Peshawar school attack, in which the Pakistani Taliban murdered 132 children and at least nine others, the authorities announced the moratorium would be lifted for terrorism cases. Executions immediately resumed, with dozens more following.

Finally on 10 March 2015, Pakistan lifted the moratorium on the use of capital punishment in the country entirely.

== International criticisms ==
=== Amnesty International ===
Amnesty International argue that at least 8,200 prisoners were under the death penalty at the end of 2014 and at least 8,500 were thought to be on death row as of June 2015. In October 2015, Minister of State for Interior Muhammad Baligh Rahman told the Senate that there were 6,016 death row inmates in the country, but it is not clear whether he was referring only to inmates whose death sentences had been finalized on appeal. Amnesty also alleged that since the lifting of a six-year moratorium on execution, there have been more than 400 carried out by the Pakistani Government. Amnesty found that not only that is a violation of the right to life, but on many occasions, capital punishment is usually imposed after an unfair trial by both the military and the civil courts.

=== Asian Legal Resource Centre ===
In a recent article, “Pakistan: Government Undermine The People’s Right to Life” the Asian Legal Resource Centre (ALRC) addressed its concerns to the UN Human Rights Council about the Pakistani Government's clear violation of Article 6 of the ICCPR. Furthermore, the ALRC states that Article 9 of Pakistan Constitution states that “No Person shall be deprived of life or liberty save in accordance with law,” yet the country's civilian and military courts are sentencing people without following due process. Even the façade of the rule of law has taken a back seat as the State gropes in the dark to deter terrorism with judicial and quasi-judicial terror. They argue that the Pakistani Government are not following international principles or instructions of ‘most serious crimes’ when ordering the killing of vulnerable people usually for the pettiest crimes. According to the Human Rights Watch, in 2016 85 people were executed.

== See also ==
- 2014 Peshawar school massacre
- Application of Islamic law by country
- Crime in Pakistan
- Human rights in Pakistan
- Law of Pakistan
