= Thana, Malakand =

Village in Pakistan

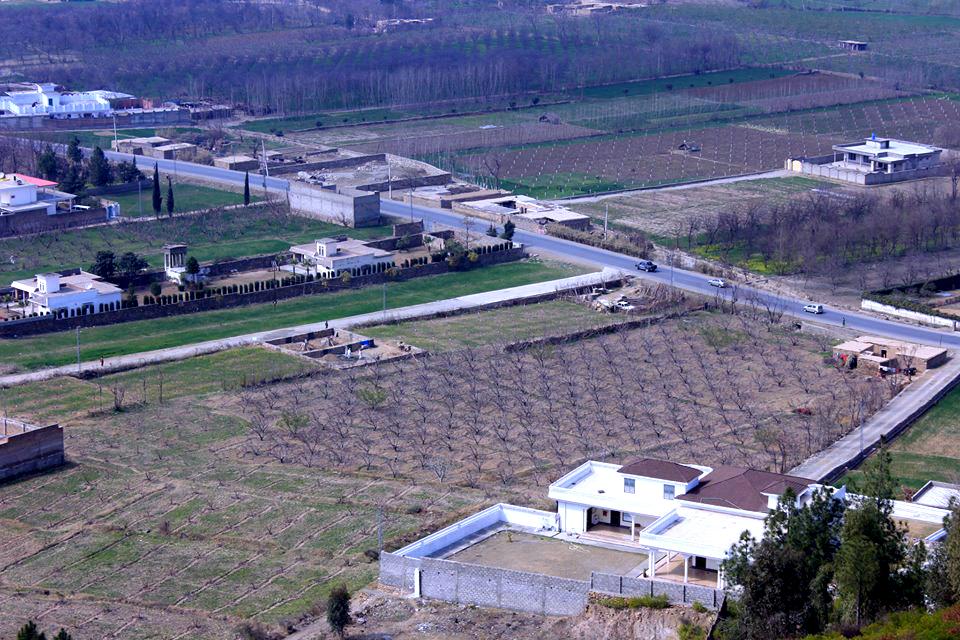
Thana, Swat Ranizai

Thana is the biggest city of Malakand District, in the Khaybar Pakhtunkhwa province of Pakistan. The name is derived from the Pashto word "Thanrha" which means "Place Of Courting", and was a main political center during the tribal period. Thana has a literacy rate of 95%, and a poverty rate of 24%. The nominal GDP of the city is approximately $690 million. The area is 230 km (140 mi) and the elevation is 950 metres (3,120 ft). The average snowfall is 2.3 cm (0.91 in).

Thana is a highly educated town, with the education ratio exceeding 98%. It has produced notable high ranking civil servants, military officers, physicians, academics, bankers, agriculturists, engineers and politicians. It has the oldest school in Malakand division, first built in the early 1910's, and this had residential accommodation for students ranging from Swat, Dir and Bajawar. Thana also has the oldest hospital in the agency. It is famous for its fruit farms and rice fields.

The area of this town includes Thana khas and Thana bandajat (garay, bakhta, gunyar, nul, butran, jalala). The main families of Thana are the Yousafzais. The Yousafzais subcastes are the Khan Koor, Ali Khail, Madey Khail, Bazidkhail, Katorkhail, Babakhail, Shamat Khail. Along with this caste, the majority of the population are immigrants from other areas who do not have a well defined family structure and are mostly associated with their professions rather than their identity. These include the Tarkans (carpenters), Engars (smiths), Zargaran (goldsmiths), and farm workers, commonly misreferred to as the Zamindars. The most prominent leading families of the Thana both politically and in land are the Khan koor and the Bazidkhail.

Prominent figures from this village include:

Dr. Sher Muhammad Khan (DG Livestock KPK),

Khan Bahadur Inayatullah Khan (Bazidkhail),

Mashar Saeed Khan (Khankor),

Khan Bahadur Behram Khan (Babakhail),

Habibullah Khan (Ex MLA West Pakistan) ,

Abdul Jalal Khan (Babakhail),

Dr Munawar Khan (Khankor) Among the first from KPK and first from Malakand Division to get PHd from London. Chairman History and Political Sciences Dept. Dean Faculties of Arts in Peshawar University. Author of Anglo-Afghan Relations

Lal Muhammad Khan (Ex Senator, Federal minister),

Abdul Kamal Khan (Ex MPA),

Majeedullah Khan (Bazidkhail),

Rabnawaz Khan (Council General Jalalabad, Babakhail),

Abdul Sattar Khan (Ex Advisor for agriculture to CM KPK, Chairman Zakat),

Mohammad Nawaz Khan (IG police),

Hanif Quazi (Agricultural Scientist),

Ghani Muhammad Khan (former chairmen economics dept Peshawar),

Ex-High Court Justice Abdul Khaliq Khan (BazidKhel),

Mohammad Ghulam (Brigadier Pakistan army, Bazidkhail),

and Lt General Hilal (Retd)(HI)M who served as Coprs Comd 1 Corps and GOC 35 Div. Also served as Secy Def

The whole division was previously Malakand agency inclusive of the princely states of Swat, Dir, Amb and Chitral. Kalam and Upper Swat was part of Malakand Agency till 1969. The college was commissioned in 1962, and now houses five campuses.

== History ==
The history of the region can be traced back to 3000 BC, which is evident from the remains present at Nookano Gund near Mora Sar. The first graveyard was also discovered here in 1964 by Hassan Dani and Munawar Khan of Thana. The town is populated by 200,000 people, of which 74,000 are registered voters.

The whole division was previously Malakand agency inclusive of the princely states of Swat, Dir, Amb and Chitral. Kalam and upper Swat was part of Malakand Agency until 1969. The college was commissioned in 1962 and now houses five colleges.

Thana is bounded by Jalala to the east, Pul Chowki to the west, the Swat river to the north and Palai to the south. Geographically Thana is divided into three parts, Thana Khas, Thana Jaded and Thana Bandajat. Owing to the fertile soil, Thana is the producer of different vegetables and fruits. It exports many important vegetables and fruits to other parts of Khyber Pakhtunkhwa and Pakistan, including tomatoes, peas, and fruits include plums, apricots, persimmons, and peaches.
