= Election Commission of Pakistan =

Constitutional body in Pakistan

- Emblem of the Election Commission of Pakistan

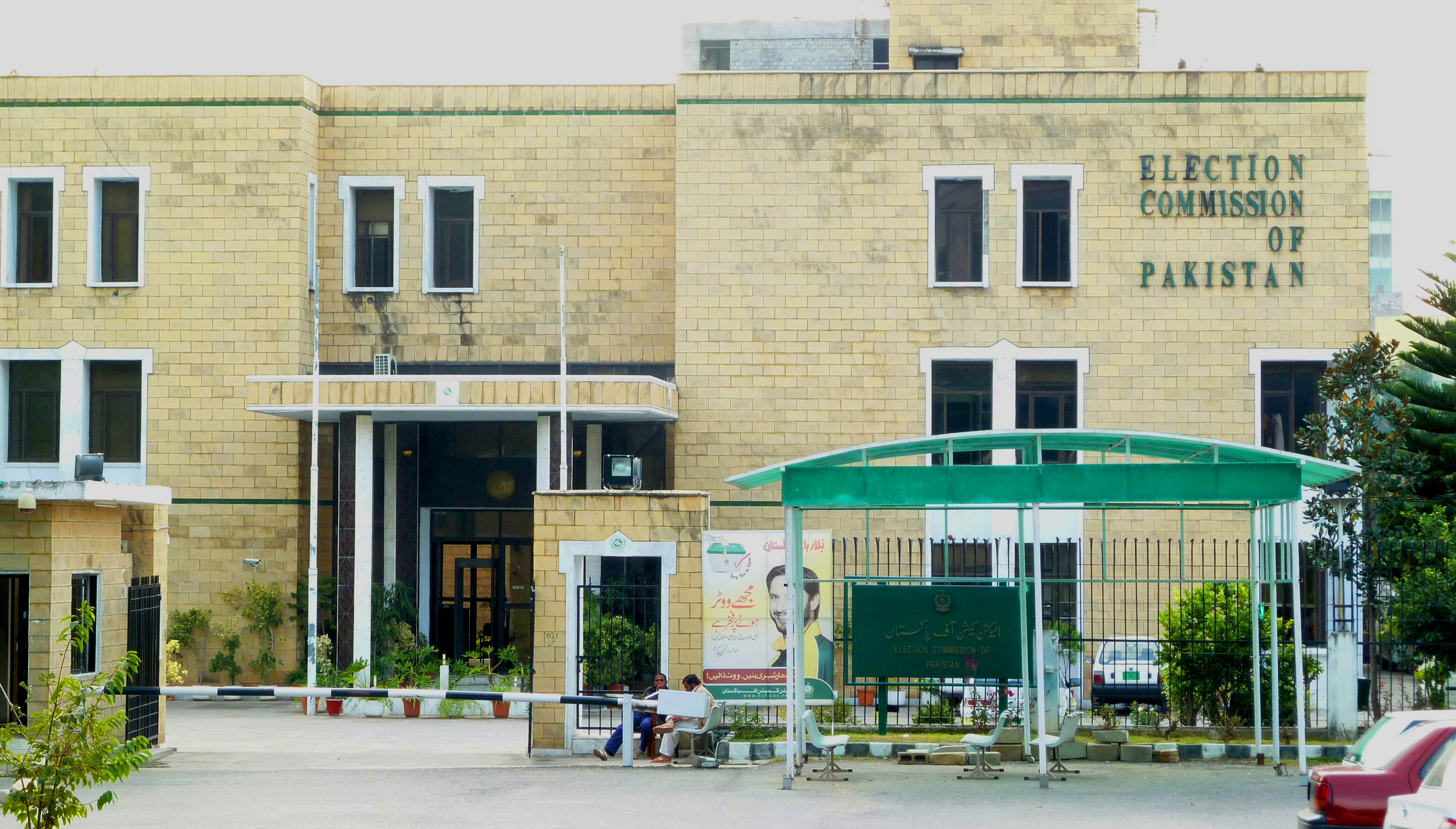
- ECP Headquarters at Islamabad

Agency overview
- Formed: 23 March 1956; 70 years ago
- Jurisdiction: Pakistan
- Headquarters: Sector G5/2, Constitution Avenue, Islamabad
- Motto: Free, Fair, Impartial
- Agency executive: Sikander Sultan Raja, Chief Election Commissioner of Pakistan
- Website: ecp.gov.pk

The Election Commission of Pakistan (Note: Urdu: انتخابی ماموریہ پاکستان) (ECP) is an independent, autonomous, permanent and constitutionally established federal body responsible for organizing and conducting elections to the national parliament, provincial legislatures, local governments, and the office of president of Pakistan, as well as the delimitation of constituencies and preparation of electoral rolls. As per the principles outlined in the Constitution of Pakistan, the Commission makes such arrangements as needed to ensure that the election is conducted honestly, justly, fairly and in accordance with law, and guard against corrupt practices. The Election Commission was formed on 23 March 1956.

The Chief Election Commissioner and four Members, each from one of the four provinces (Punjab, Sindh, Balochistan and Khyber Pakhtunkhwa) of the country, form the five-member panel of the Election Commission. The current Chief Election Commissioner of Pakistan is Sikandar Sultan Raja. The General Elections 2018 and General Elections 2024 were performed under the Elections Act 2017, which was passed by the National Assembly on 2 October 2017.

Based on recommendation, the Election Commission made available voters' data (Electoral Rolls) on 8300 Short Message Service (SMS) gained national and international acceptance and appreciation by making Pakistan pioneer in the World. The London-based international organization International Centre for Parliamentary Studies (ICPS) awarded ECP/Pakistan two International Awards i.e. 'Use of Innovative Technology Award' and 'Accessibility Award' in Kuala Lumpur, Malaysia, December 2013 during an international competition. Similarly, another international award was given to the ECP on preparing voters list following international standards based on Unique Identifier i.e. CNIC (One CNIC, One Vote) in Cape Town, South Africa, December 2014.

The Commonwealth organization in its Report March 2020 ("Cybersecurity in Elections") acknowledged and appreciated the technological efforts made by the ECP / Pakistan by conducting various pilot projects on Electronic Voting Machines (EVM), Biometric Verification Machines (BVM) and Overseas Voting using Internet mode of voting in appropriated manner. In the same report, The Commonwealth Org also recognized the 8300 SMS service which has been successfully operational since February 2012. The service has been declared the biggest voters' database, comprising more than 128.8 million voters for mobile customers of 190 million in the country. Currently, more than 128.8 million database of voters are placed on ECP's prestigious SMS (8300) for over 190 million mobile customers of the country. The said service is highly secured and available 24/7/365.

== Function and duties ==
The functions and duties of the Election Commission of Pakistan (ECP) are defined and set by the Constitution of Pakistan in Article 219, which charges the commission with the following duties:

1. To prepare electoral rolls for elections to the National and Provincial Assemblies and revising such rolls annually [Article 219 (a)];
2. To organize and conduct election to the Senate and fill casual vacancies in a House or a Provincial Assembly [Article 219(b)];
3. To organize and conduct election to the Local Government institutions [Article 140(A)];
4. To appoint Election Tribunals. [Article 219 (c)];
5. To decide cases of disqualification of members of Parliament and Provincial Assemblies under [Article 63(2)]; and [Article 63(A)]; of the Constitution on receipt of reference from the Chairman or the Speaker or Head of the political party, as the case may be;
6. To hold and conduct election to the office of the President as per Second Schedule to the Constitution of the Islamic Republic of Pakistan [Article 41 (3)];
7. To hold Referendum as and when ordered by the President. [Article 48 (6)]

For the purpose of each national general election to the State Parliament (National Assembly) and to a Provincial legislatures (Sindh, Punjab, Khyber-Pakhtunkhwa, and Balochistan), an Election Commission shall be constituted in accordance with the Article 239G. It shall be the duty of the Election Commission constituted in relation to an election to organize and conduct the election and to make such arrangements as are necessary to ensure that the election is conducted honestly, justly, fairly and in accordance with law, and that corrupt practices are guarded against.

— Article 218–219: Election Commissions; Part-VIII, Chapter:1 Chief Election Commissioner, source: The Constitution of Pakistan

== Autonomy and independence ==
The Commission retains full financial autonomy and independence from all government control. Without government interference, the commission performs its functions and conduct of nationwide general elections, as well as for the by-elections decided by the Election Commission itself. The commission also prepares polling schemes, appoints polling personnel, assigns voters and arranges for the maintenance of law and order.

In its ruling in the case Election Commission v. Javed Hashmi, the Supreme Court held that "in the election matters the Election Tribunals which are to be appointed by the Chief Election Commissioner" have exclusive jurisdiction and the jurisdiction of all courts in such matters was excluded. However, this is subject to an exception when there is no legal remedy is available to an aggrieved party during the process of election or after its completion and is against an order of an election functionary which is patently illegal jurisdiction, the effect of which is to disenfranchise a candidate. In such a case, candidate can press into service Constitutional jurisdiction of the High Court. The Supreme Court of Pakistan has since then consistently followed this judgment.

== Members ==
The ECP has a four-member panel from all the four provinces (Punjab, Sindh, Balochistan and Khyber Pakhtunkhwa) and four Provincial Election Commissioners. The Commission transacts its business by holding meetings. All members of the Election Commission have equal status and say in the decisions of the Commission.

The President of Pakistan appoints the Chief Election Commissioner of Pakistan and four members of Election Commission. The Prime Minister of Pakistan and Leader of the Opposition (Pakistan) in the National Assembly of Pakistan recommends three names for appointment of CEC and for each Member to a parliamentary committee for hearing and confirmation of any one person against each post.

List of members
Name	Provinces	Date of appointment
Vacant	Chief Election Commissioner of Pakistan	TBD
Vacant	Member (Sindh)	24 January 2020
Vacant	Member (Balochistan, Pakistan)	24 January 2020
Vacant	Member (Punjab, Pakistan)	30 May 2022
Vacant	Member (Khyber Pakhtunkhwa)	30 May 2022
List of officers		
Officers of ECP Secretariat	Designation	
Vacant	Secretary	
Vacant	Special Secretary	
Vacant	Director General (Law)	
Vacant	Director General (Political Finance)	
Vacant	Director General (Information Technology)	
Vacant	Director General (Training)	
Vacant	Additional Director General (Admn/HR)	
Vancat	Additional Director General (Electoral Rolls)	
Vacant	Additional Director General (Gender & Social Inclusion)	
Vacant	Additional Director General (Election - I & II)	
Vacant	Additional Director General (Monitoring & Evaluation)	
Vacant	Additional Director General (Political Finance)	
Vacant	Additional Director General (Budget & Accounts)	
Vacant	Additional Director General (Law)	
List of Provincial Election Commissioners
Provincial Election Commissioners	Province	
Vacant	Sindh	
Vacant	Punjab, Pakistan	
Vacant	Balochistan	
Vacant	Khyber Pakhtunkhwa	

== Transaction of business ==
The commission transacts its business by holding meetings. All members of the Election Commission have equal status and say in the decisions of the Commission.

== Judicial review ==
Judicial review of the decisions of the Election Commission can be sought in the High Courts and the Supreme Court of Pakistan if the order suffers from a jurisdictional defect or is mala fide—in bad faith—or is coram non judice, that is, performed without jurisdiction.

== Budget and expenditure ==
The budget of the Election Commission is provided by the federal government.

Any re-appropriation within the sanctioned budget can be done by the Chief Election Commissioner without making any reference to the Finance Division.

Funds required for preparation of electoral rolls and the conduct of General Elections and by-elections are provided in lump sum by the Finance Division according to the requirements of the Election Commission.

Further distribution of funds to the various functionaries is done with the approval of the Chief Election Commissioner.

== General election forms ==
=== Form 45 ===
Form 45, often referred to as the Result of the Count, is crucial for giving detailed information at the polling station level. It includes data such as the polling station's identification, the name of the constituency, the total number of registered voters, the total votes cast, and a detailed breakdown of the votes received by each candidate. It bears the signature and thumbprint of the presiding officer of a polling station and his senior-most assistant, as well as the signatures of observing polling agents of each candidate. An original copy of Form 45 is given to each polling agent present, as well as any independent election observers viewing the counting process. The form is then transmitted to the concerned returning officer (RO) for consolidation with other such forms for an electoral district, as well as being prominently displayed at the relevant polling station.

=== Form 46 ===
Form 46, also referred to as Ballot Paper Account, is to track the logistics of ballot papers at a polling station. It records the number of ballot papers that were received at the polling station, the number that were issued, and accounts for any ballots that were challenged, spoiled, or voided. The form also highlights any irregularities that may have occurred during the voting process. Like Form 45, it is issued by the presiding officer of a polling station at the end of a vote count. The form is similarly signed, thumbprinted, and then shared with the polling agents and election observers before finally being transmitted to the RO.

After both Form 45 and 46 are issued, the presiding officer seals all polling material, including used and unused ballots, counterfoils, marked voter lists, and challenged ballots, in specially designated envelopes in the presence of all observers. These materials are then kept at the polling station pending any further statutory use, like in a vote recount.

=== Form 47 ===
Form 47, also known as Consolidated Statement of Results of the Count, is issued by returning officer (RO) for their respective electoral constituency after they have received Form 45 and 46 from all relevant polling stations. This form used by the Election Commission of Pakistan (ECP) to give an early glimpse into the election results by detailing the number of votes that were rejected and provides a preliminary count of the votes each candidate received, based on the unofficial results from the constituency. By law, the consolidation of the count happens in front of the candidates or their nominated representatives, as well as any independent observers present. Form 47 does not include postal ballots and is the first form that is directly transmitted to the ECP's central election management office upon completion.

=== Form 48 ===
Form 48, also referred to as Final Consolidated Result, is used for compiling the election results for an electoral constituency within seven days of polling. It is issued after the relevant RO invites the candidates or their nominated representatives for a final tabulation. In this consolidation, postal ballots are also included, contested and rejected votes are rechecked, as well as the result of a vote recount is included, if conducted. According to the relevant law, a recount is conducted on written application of the runner-up candidate provided that the margin of victory is less than 5% of the votes polled or 8,000 votes, whichever is less, or the number of rejected votes exceed the margin of victory. Form 48 is also directly sent to ECP upon completion and any sealed polling material opened for the consolidation is resealed in temper-evident bags.

=== Form 49 ===
Form 49, also known as the Gazetted Form, declares the official election results. The form lists the names of the candidates, their affiliated political parties, and the total votes each candidate received in the constituency. It is issued by the ECP and published in The Gazette of Pakistan, within 14 days of the close of polling, after Form 48s are received for all electoral districts where the elections were held.

== See also ==
- Chief Election Commissioner of Pakistan
- Elections in Pakistan
- List of Members of The Election Commission of Pakistan
- Election Commission Gilgit-Baltistan
- Azad Jammu & Kashmir Election Commission
