= Peshawar High Court =

Provincial high court in Pakistan

- د پېښور عالي محکمه
- Peshawar High Court logo
- Jurisdiction: Khyber Pakhtunkhwa
- Location: Principal Seat: Peshawar; Circuit Benches: Abbottabad, Mingora, Dera Ismail Khan, Banu & Swat
- Composition method: Judicial Commission of Pakistan
- Authorised by: Constitution of Pakistan
- Appeals to: Supreme Court of Pakistan
- Appeals from: District Courts of Khyber Pakhtunkhwa
- Number of positions: 30
- Type of tribunal: District Judiciary in Khyber Pakhtunkhwa
- Website: peshawarhighcourt.gov.pk

Chief Justice
- Currently: Syed Muhammad Attique Shah
- Since: 14 February 2025

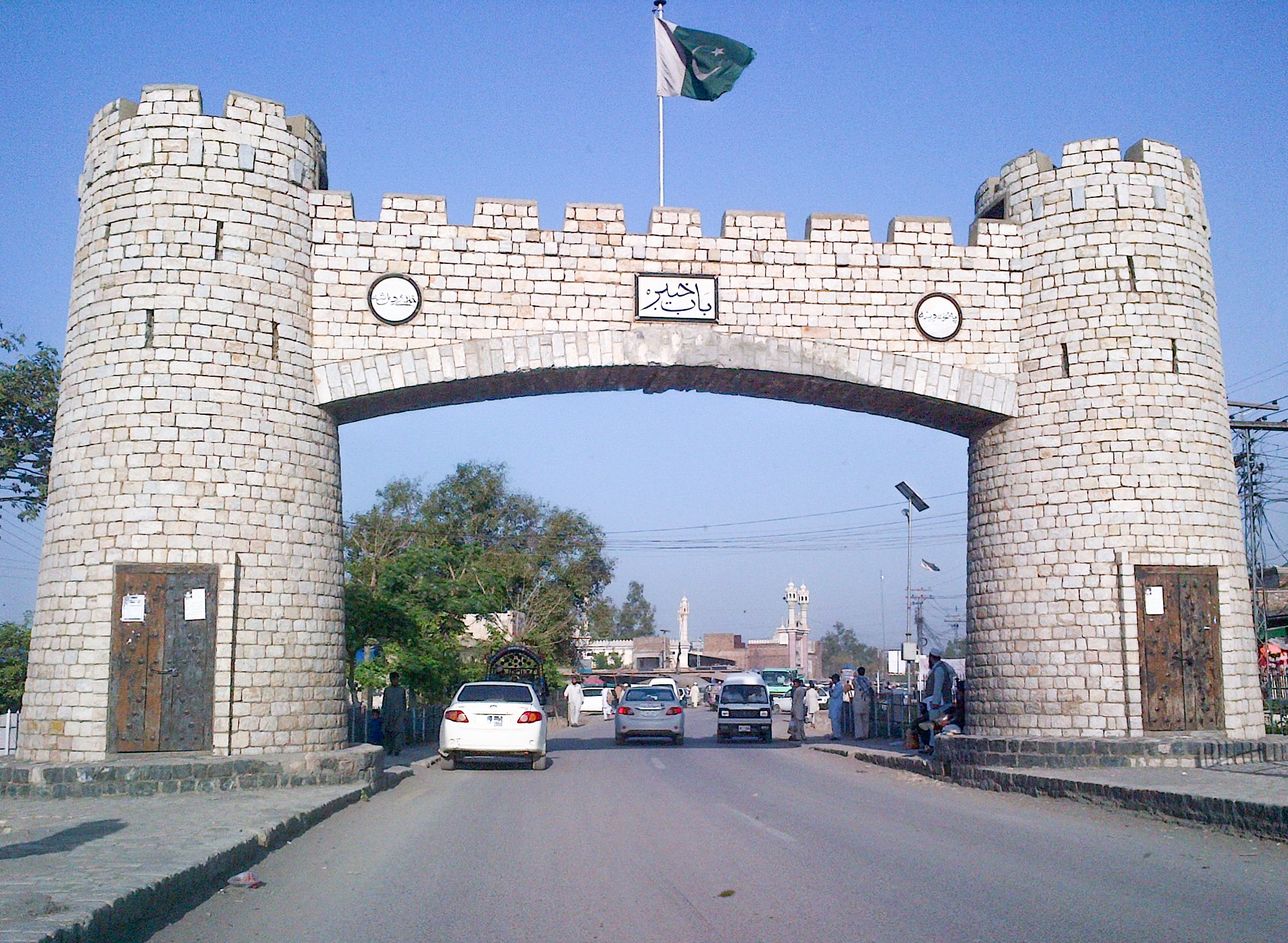
Peshawar

The Peshawar High Court (PHC,Pashto: د پېښور عالي محکمه Urdu: عدالتِ عالیہ پشاور) is the highest judicial institution in the Khyber Pakhtunkhwa province of Pakistan. The principal seat of the high court is located in the provincial capital Peshawar. The Parliament passed a bill extending the jurisdiction of the Supreme Court (SC) and the Peshawar High Court to Federally Administered Tribal Areas (FATA), one of a handful of reforms paving the way for a merger of the tribal areas with Khyber Pakhtunkhwa.

== History ==
During the last days of the 19th century, the viceroy of India Lord Curzon (1899–1905), proposed the creation of Khyber-Pakhtunkhwa province (then NWFP) which was approved by the Secretary of State for India, Lord George F. Hamilton, on 20 December 1900.

The province was formally founded on 9 November 1901, (the King's birthday) had to get one Judicial Commissioner. The Khyber-Pakhtunkhwa Law and Justice Regulation No. VII of 1901 was enacted by the Governor-General-in-Council, under section 3 of the Government of India Act, 1854, in order to establish judicial institutions.

=== Notable Historical Administration ===
In the late 20th century (1980s–1990s), the administration and regional benches of the judiciary saw senior judicial officers from the southern districts serving in key positions. Notably, **Judge Ghazi Khan Durrani (sadozai)**, hailing from the Sadozai clan of Bannu, served as a senior District & Sessions Judge presiding over courts in Dera Ismail Khan (D.I. Khan) and Bannu, and was subsequently elevated to the administrative rank of Registrar / Additional Registrar of the Peshawar High Court.

== Current formation ==
The Constitution of Pakistan, 1973 provides that Peshawar High Court shall have a Bench each at Abbottabad and Dera Ismail Khan. Article 199 of the Constitution lays down in detail the jurisdiction of the High Court. The jurisdiction was more or less the same as provided under the Constitution of 1956 and further detailed under the Constitution of 1962.

The Constitution of Pakistan, 1956, Article 170, states that:

"Notwithstanding anything contained in Article 22, each High Court shall have power throughout the territories in relation to which it exercise jurisdiction, to issue to any person or authority, including in appropriate cases any Government directions, orders or writs, including writs in the nature of habeas corpus, mandamus, prohibition, quo warranto and certiorari, for the enforcement of any of the rights conferred by Part II and for any other purpose."

== Justices of Peshawar High Court ==
High Court is headed by a Chief Justice. The bench consist of Justices and additional judges. The retirement age of Chief Justice and Justices is 62 years. The Additional Judges are initially appointed for one year. After that their services could either be extended or they could be confirmed or they are retired. The current Chief Justice of the Peshawar High Court is Justice Syed Muhammad Attique Shah.

=== Current composition ===
The Peshawar High Court is currently made up of the following Justices (in order of seniority).

No.	Name	Appointment	Retirement	Note(s)
1	Syed Muhammad Attique Shah	27 March 2017	11 October 2030	Chief Justice since 14 February 2025
2	Ijaz Anwar	27 March 2017	14 January 2030	Senior Pusine Judge since 15 April 2024
3	Syed Arshad Ali	16 June 2017	9 April 2033	
4	Sahibzada Asadullah	19 August 2019	15 April 2034	
5	Naeem Anwar	19 August 2019	14 June 2034	
6	Waqar Ahmed Khan	19 August 2019	19 March 2036	
7	Babar Sattar	30 December 2020	14 February 2038	Transferred from IHC on 29th April 2026
8	Kamran Hayat Miankhel	11 February 2022	6 April 2032	
9	Muhammad Ijaz Khan	11 February 2022	15 April 2034	
10	Muhammad Faheem Wali	11 February 2022	31 July 2035	
11	Dr. Khurshid Iqbal	18 July 2022	31 March 2030	
12	Muhammad Tariq Afridi	4 February 2025	26 December 2028	
13	Abdul Fayyaz	4 February 2025	31 December 2031	
14	Salah ud Din	4 February 2025	24 February 2037	
15	Sadiq Ali	4 February 2025	19 March 2039	
16	Syed Mudasser Ameer	4 February 2025	5 April 2039	
17	Qazi Jawad Ehsanullah	4 February 2025	17 April 2040	
18	Farah Jamshed	4 February 2025	1 January 2032	
19	Inam Ullah Khan	4 February 2025	30 September 2029	
20	Sabit Ullah Khan	4 February 2025	31 December 2033	
21	Aurangzeb	4 February 2025	24 December 2039	
22	Vacant			
23	Vacant			
24	Vacant			
25	Vacant			
26	Vacant			
27	Vacant			
28	Vacant			
29	Vacant			
30	Vacant			

== Provisional Constitutional Order 25 March 1981 ==
- Muhammad Daud Khan - Refused PCO
- Karimullah Duranni - Refused PCO

== Provisional Constitutional Order 26 January 2000 ==
- Javed NawazGandapur - Did not take oath under PCO
- Muhammad Nawaz Khan - Did not take oath under PCO
- Mian Muhammad Ajmal - Take oath under PCO was Chief Justice
- Sardar Muhammad Raza - Take oath under PCO
- Khalida Rasheed - Take oath under PCO
- Mian Shakirullah Jan - Take oath under PCO
- Nasir ul Mulk - Take oath under PCO
- Abdul Rauf Laghmani - Take oath under PCO
- Shahzad Akbar - Take oath under PCO
- Talaat Qayum Qureshi - Take oath under PCO
- Malik Hamid Saeed - Take oath under PCO
- Shah Jehan Yousafzai - Take oath under PCO

== Provisional Constitutional Order 3 November 2007 ==
- Tariq Parvez Khan - Didn't take Oath under PCO later elevated to the Supreme Court
- Ijaz Afzal - Did not take oath under PCO later elevated to the Supreme Court
- Dost Muhammad Khan - Didn't Take Oath under PCO (Elevated to the Supreme court (Feb:01.2014)
- Shah Jehan Khan Yousafzai - Retired as Judge of High Court after superseded
- Talaat Qayyum Qureshi - Take oath under PCO and become chief justice
- Ijazul Hassan Khan - Elevated to the Supreme court
- Muhammad Qaim Jan Khan - Elevated to the Supreme court
- M. Salim Khan - Take oath under PCO
- Muhammad Raza - Take oath under PCO
- Jehan Zaib Rahim - Take oath under PCO
- Raj Muhammad Khan Khattak - Take oath under PCO
- Said Maroof Khan - Take oath under PCO
- Hamid Farooq Durrani - Take oath under PCO
- Syed Sajjad Hassan Shah - Take oath under PCO
- Judges appointed after PCO
- Shaji-ur-Rehman Khan Khattak
- Ghulam Mohiuddin Malik
- Syed Yahya Gilani
- Ziauddin Khattak
- Syed Musadiq Hussain Gilani

== List of former chief justices of Peshawar High Court ==
- Bashir-ud-Din Ahmad Khan - 1-7-1970 to 24–5–1972
- S. Ghulam Safdar Shah - 25-5-1972 to 31–10–1976
- Abdul Hakeem Khan Lughmani Swati - 1-11-1976 to 3–10–1979
- Shah Nawaz Khan - 3-10-1979 to 5–4–1981
- Mian Burhan-ud-Din - 5-4-1981 to 17–12–1981
- Syed Usman Ali Shah - 19-12-1981 to 7–12–1987
- Sardar Fakhre Alam - 7-12-1987 to 7–2–1991
- Fazal Ilahi Khan - 9-2-1991 to 1–4–1993
- Abdul Karim Khan Kundi - 1-4-1993 to 24–1–1995
- Syed Ibne Ali - 25-1-1995 to 28–2–1997
- Abdur Rehman Khan - 1-3-1997 to 3–11–1997
- Mahbub Ali Khan - 4-11-1997 to 11–5–1999
- Qazi Muhammad Farooq - 12-5-1999 to 5–1–2000
- Mian Muhammad Ajmal - 6-1-2000 to 27–4–2000
- Sardar Muhammad Raza Khan - 28-4-2000 to 9–1–2002
- Mian Shakirullah Jan - 10-1-2002 to 30–7–2004
- Nasir-ul-Mulk - 31-7-2004 to 5–4–2005
- Tariq Pervez Khan - 5-4-2005 to 03–11–2007
- Talat Qayyum Qureshi - 3-11-2007 to 18–01–2008
- Muhammad Raza Khan - 21-01-2008 to 07–08–2008
- Jehan Zaib Rahim - 8-8-2008 to 5–09–2008
- Tariq Parvez Khan - 5-9-2008 to 20–10–2009
- Ejaz Afzal Khan Khankhail Swati - 20-10-2009 to 16–11–2011
- Dost Muhammad Khan - 17-11-2011 to 31–01–2014
- Mian Fasih-ul-Mulk - 31-01-2014 to 07–04–2014
- Mazhar Alam Khan Miankhel - 8-04-2014 to 29–12–2016
- Yahya Afridi - 30-12-2016 to 27–06–2018
- Waqar Ahmed Seth(late) - 28 June 2018 to 12 November 2020.
- Qaiser Rashid Khan - 16-11-2020 to 30–3–2023
- Musarrat Hilali - 1-4-2023 to 4–7–2023

== List of former justices of Peshawar High Court ==
- Bashir-ud-Din Ahmad Khan
- Ghulam Safdar Shah
- Sher Bahadur Khan
- Shah Zaman Babar
- Kareemullah Durrani
- Abdul Hakim Khan
- Shah Nawaz Khan
- Mian Burhanuddin
- S. Usman Ali Shah
- Sardar Fakhre Alam
- Ali Hussain Qazilbash
- Fazal Ilahi Khan
- Abdur Rehman Khan Kaif
- Fazal Ellahi Khan
- Abdul Karim Khan Kundi
- Nazir Ahmad Bhatti
- Muhammad Bashir Jehangiri (Not retired from PHC)
- Qazi Hamiduddin
- Salim Dil Khan (Died during service)
- Khalida Rashid (Not retired from PHC)
- Jawaid Nawaz Khan Gandapur
- Shah Jehan Khan
- Qazi Ehsanullah Qureshi
- Malik Hamid Saeed
- Talaat Qayyum Qureshi (Died during service)
- Shahzad Akbar Khan
- Ijazul Hassan Khan
- Muhammad Qaim Jan Khan
- Raj Muhammad Khan
- Said Maroof Khan
- Hamid Farooq Durrani
- Khalid Mahmood (Reversed)
- Attaullah Khan
- Miftah-Ud-Din Khan
- Assadullah Khan Chammkani
- Irshad Qaiser
- Muhammad Daud Khan
- Nisar Hussain Khan
- Muhammad Younas Thaheem
- Qalandar Ali Khan
- Muhammad Ghazanfar Khan
- Muhammad Ayub Khan
- Syed Afsar Shah
- Ikramullah Khan
- Nasir Mehfooz
- Lal Jan Khattak
- Rooh Ul Amin Khan

== See also ==
- Supreme Court of Pakistan
- Islamabad High Court
- Balochistan High Court
- Sindh High Court
- Lahore High Court
- Court system of Pakistan
