= Amendments to the Constitution of Pakistan =

This is a list of all the amendments to the Constitution of Pakistan.

#	Amendments	Proposal date	Enactment date	Full text
1st	Redefined the boundaries of Pakistan and removed references to East Pakistan.		4 May 1974	Full Text
2nd	Defined a Muslim and declared the status of Ahmadis as minority and 'non-Muslim'.		17 September 1974	Full Text
3rd	Extended the period of preventive detention from one month to three months		18 February 1975	Full Text
4th	Decreed additional seats for minorities, it also deprived courts of the power to grant bail to any person detained under any preventive detention.		21 November 1975	Full Text
5th	Widened the scope of restriction on the High Courts.		5 September 1976	Full Text
6th	Provided that Chief Justice of Supreme Court will be retired at the age of 65 and High Court judges at age 62.		22 December 1976	Full Text
7th	Enables the prime minister to obtain a vote of confidence of the people of Pakistan.		16 May 1977	Full Text
8th	Changed Pakistan's government from a Parliamentary system to a Semi-presidential system by giving the President a number of additional powers.		11 November 1985	Full Text
9th	Bill to impose Shariah law as the supreme law of land. The bill was passed by Senate but could never be passed by National Assembly owing to the latter's dissolution.	1985	Not passed	Full Text
10th	Fixed the interval period between sessions of the National Assembly to not exceed 130 days.		25 March 1987	Full Text
11th	Revision of the reserved seats for women in the National and the provincial assemblies. The bill was withdrawn in 1992.	1989	Not passed	Full Text
12th	Created Speedy Trial Court for 3 years.		1991	Full Text
13th	Stripped the President of Pakistan of his reserve power to dissolve the National Assembly of Pakistan, and thereby triggering new elections and dismissing the Prime Minister.		1997	Full Text
14th	Allowed members of parliament to be dismissed if they defect.		3 July 1997	Full Text
15th	Bill to impose Shariah law as supreme law of land. Was never passed.	1998	Not passed	Full Text
16th	Increased the term appointed for quota system as per 1973 Constitution from 20 to 40 years.		1999	Full Text
17th	Made changes dealing with the office of the President and the reversal of the effects of the Thirteenth Amendment.		2003	Full Text
18th	Removed the power of President of Pakistan to dissolve the Parliament unilaterally. Gave more authority to the provinces. Province of North-West Frontier Province(NWFP) was renamed as Khyber Pakhtunkhwa		8 April 2010	Full Text
19th	Provided for the appointment of the Judges of the Supreme Court of Pakistan and made amendments in the number of members of the parliamentary committee for the appointment of Chief Electoral Officers at Election Commission of Pakistan.		22 December 2010	Full Text
20th	For Free and Fair Elections.		14 February 2012	Full Text
21st	In the aftermath of APS Peshawar Attack, Military Courts were established for speedy trials of terrorists and their sponsors.		7 January 2015	Full Text
22nd	ECP powers deputed to Chief Election Commissioner		8 June 2016	Full Text
23rd	The 23rd Amendment was passed to re-establish the military courts for further two years till 6 January 2019. In 2015, National Assembly passed the 21st Amendment and created the military courts for the period of 2 years. The period of two years was expired on 6 January 2017 hence this 23rd Amendment was passed to re-establish the military courts for further two years till 6 January 2019. At the end of this period all the amendments will be expired/removed automatically.		7 January 2017	Full Text
24th	Reallocation of National Assembly seats among federating units and allowing election authorities to update boundaries of constituencies based on provisional results of 2017 Census of Pakistan.		22 December 2017	Full Text
25th	Merges Federally Administered Tribal Areas with Khyber Pakhtunkhwa.		31 May 2018	Full Text
26th	It is a set of constitutional amendments — containing 27 clauses — including the fixture of the chief justice’s term.	20 October 2024	21 October 2024	
27th	The amendment addresses a set of issues, i.e., judicial structure (including the formation of the Constitutional Court), federal-provincial relations, military command arrangements (particularly the revision of Article 243), and top appointments in the armed forces.	8 November 2025	13 November 2025	
28th	Proposed changes include raising the voting age to 25, delinking elections from the census, centralising province-creation, returning devolved subjects to the federation, making the NFC share flexible, and empowering local governments fiscally.	In Public Discussion	Soon to be Enacted in October 2026-December 2026	
