= Article 199 of the Constitution of Pakistan =

Jurisdiction of the High Courts of Pakistan

Article 199 of the Constitution of Pakistan sets out the constitutional jurisdiction of the High Courts to make orders against public authorities and certain other persons. It is commonly described as the source of the writ jurisdiction at the provincial High Court level in Pakistan. The article empowers a High Court, subject to the Constitution and to the absence of any other adequate legal remedy, to restrain unlawful official action, declare such action void, order production of a person alleged to be unlawfully detained, require the holder of a public office to justify the authority by which that office is held, and issue directions for the enforcement of fundamental rights.

Since the Twenty-sixth Amendment in 2024, Article 199 has also expressly stated that a High Court may not make an order, direction or declaration on its own, or in the nature of suo motu jurisdiction, beyond the contents of an application filed under the article. The same amendment inserted Article 202A, which provides, subject to commencement by resolution under clause (7), that no bench of a High Court other than a Constitutional Bench shall exercise jurisdiction vested in the High Court under Article 199.

== Text ==
The opening part of Article 199, as in force after the Twenty-seventh Amendment, reads:

199. (1) Subject to the Constitution, a High Court may, if it is satisfied that no other adequate remedy is provided by law,—

(a) on the application of any aggrieved party, make an order—
(i) directing a person performing, within the territorial jurisdiction of the Court, functions in connection with the affairs of the Federation, a Province or a local authority, to refrain from doing anything he is not permitted by law to do, or to do anything he is required by law to do; or
(ii) declaring that any act done or proceeding taken within the territorial jurisdiction of the Court by a person performing functions in connection with the affairs of the Federation, a Province or a local authority has been done or taken without lawful authority and is of no legal effect; or
(b) on the application of any person, make an order—
(i) directing that a person in custody within the territorial jurisdiction of the Court be brought before it so that the Court may satisfy itself that he is not being held in custody without lawful authority or in an unlawful manner; or
(ii) requiring a person within the territorial jurisdiction of the Court holding or purporting to hold a public office to show under what authority of law he claims to hold that office; or

(c) on the application of any aggrieved person, make an order giving such directions to any person or authority, including any Government exercising any power or performing any function in, or in relation to, any territory within the jurisdiction of that Court as may be appropriate for the enforcement of any of the Fundamental Rights conferred by Chapter 1 of Part II.

Clauses (1A) to (5) provide that the High Court may not act on its own beyond the contents of an application filed under clause (1); that the right to move a High Court for enforcement of fundamental rights shall not be abridged; that members of the Pakistan Armed Forces and persons subject to armed-forces law may not seek relief under clause (1) in service matters; that certain interim orders are restricted and time-limited; and that the article defines the terms person and prescribed law officer.

== Background ==
Article 199 is widely described as the constitutional framework of writ jurisdiction in the High Courts. Its structure corresponds to a number of familiar public law remedies, including relief analogous to mandamus, certiorari, habeas corpus and quo warranto, while also expressly authorising directions for the enforcement of fundamental rights.

In practice, petitions under Article 199 are commonly known in Pakistan as constitutional petitions or writ petitions. The article has long been one of the principal constitutional mechanisms through which citizens, office-holders, detainees and public-interest litigants challenge the legality of executive and administrative action before the High Courts.

== Judicial interpretation ==
The courts have treated Article 199 as a constitutional grant of judicial review, but one subject to threshold limits and discretion. In discussing standing, the Supreme Court has distinguished between the ordinary requirement that an aggrieved person show a legal grievance and the broader rule applicable to a writ of quo warranto under Article 199(1)(b)(ii).

In Hafiz Hamdullah v Saifullah Khan (PLD 2007 SC 52), the Supreme Court held that for issuance of a writ of quo warranto, a person invoking Article 199 is not required to fulfil the stricter conditions ordinarily needed to establish that he is an aggrieved person, and that any person may move a High Court to challenge the unauthorized occupation of a public office.

== Amendment history ==
Article 199 has been amended several times since 1973, especially in relation to service exclusions and interim relief.

Date	Measure	Effect on Article 199
May 4, 1974	Constitution (First Amendment) Act, 1974	Substituted clause (3) so that the exclusion from relief in service matters applied not only to members of the Armed Forces of Pakistan but also to persons for the time being subject to any law relating to those forces.
November 21, 1975	Constitution (Fourth Amendment) Act, 1975	Inserted the original clause (3A), restricting interim orders in preventive-detention matters, and inserted the original clause (4A).
September 16, 1976	Constitution (Fifth Amendment) Act, 1976	Substituted broader clauses (3A) to (3C), extending restrictions on interim orders and related proceedings in criminal and detention matters.
March 2, 1985	Revival of the Constitution of 1973 Order, 1985	Omitted clauses (3A) to (3C), inserted the words "or State property" in clause (4), changed the duration language in clause (4A), and inserted clause (4B).
April 19, 2010	Constitution (Eighteenth Amendment) Act, 2010	Substituted clause (4A) in its later form concerning interim orders relating to laws in Part I of the First Schedule, state property, and public revenues.
October 21, 2024	Constitution (Twenty-sixth Amendment) Act, 2024	Inserted clause (1A), providing that a High Court shall not make an order, direction or declaration on its own or in the nature of suo motu exercise of jurisdiction beyond the contents of an application filed under clause (1).
November 13, 2025	Constitution (Twenty-seventh Amendment) Act, 2025	Amended the proviso to clause (4A) and updated clause (5) so that the definition of person excludes the Federal Constitutional Court in addition to the Supreme Court, a High Court, and armed-forces courts or tribunals.

== Constitutional benches ==
The Twenty-sixth Amendment also inserted Article 202A, creating Constitutional Benches of the High Courts. Article 202A(3) states that no bench of a High Court other than a Constitutional Bench shall exercise jurisdiction vested in the High Court under Article 199, while Article 202A(5) transfers certain pending Article 199 petitions and appeals to those benches; however, Article 202A(7) provides that the new regime comes into force only if the relevant legislative body adopts a resolution giving effect to the provision.

== See also ==
- Article 184(3) of the Constitution of Pakistan
- Judicial review in Pakistan
- Fundamental rights in Pakistan
