= Article 184(3) of the Constitution of Pakistan =

Former constitutional clause in Pakistan

Article 184(3) was a clause of Article 184 of the Constitution of Pakistan that conferred original jurisdiction on the Supreme Court of Pakistan, allowing it to entertain a case directly rather than through an appeal and issue orders of the kind mentioned in Article 199 when it deemed that a question of public importance relating to the enforcement of fundamental rights was involved. The clause became the principal constitutional basis for the Supreme Court's public interest litigation and suo motu jurisdiction in Pakistan.

The text of Article 184(3) remained unchanged from the coming into force of the 1973 Constitution until the Twenty-sixth Amendment in 2024, which added a proviso restricting the Court from acting on its own, or in the nature of suo motu jurisdiction, beyond the contents of an application filed under the clause. On November 13, 2025, the Twenty-seventh Amendment omitted Article 184 and transferred substantially similar jurisdiction to the newly created Federal Constitutional Court under Article 175E(3).

== Text ==
Immediately before its omission in 2025, Article 184(3) read:

Without prejudice to the provisions of Article 199, the Supreme Court shall, if it considers that a question of public importance with reference to the enforcement of any of the Fundamental Rights conferred by Chapter 1 of Part II is involved, have the power to make an order of the nature mentioned in the said Article:
Provided that the Supreme Court shall not make an order or give direction or make a declaration on its own or in the nature of suo motu exercise of jurisdiction beyond the contents of any application filed under this clause.

Before the Twenty-sixth Amendment, the proviso did not exist, and the clause ended after the words "mentioned in the said Article."

== Background ==
Article 184(3) was framed as a special form of original jurisdiction for the Supreme Court, operating "without prejudice" to the writ jurisdiction of the High Courts under Article 199. In practice, the clause required two constitutional conditions: a question of public importance and a link to the enforcement of one or more fundamental rights in Chapter 1 of Part II of the Constitution.

In Benazir Bhutto v Federation of Pakistan (PLD 1988 SC 416), the Supreme Court gave the clause an expansive reading. The Court held that the "traditional rule of locus standi can be dispensed with" in appropriate public-interest cases and that the full procedural "trappings" of Article 199 need not be imported into Article 184(3).

Scholars have identified Darshan Masih v The State (PLD 1990 SC 513) as the major turning point in the later development of the clause. In that case, the Supreme Court accepted an informal communication concerning bonded labour and treated it as a human-rights petition, helping to establish the association between Article 184(3) and suo motu or epistolary jurisdiction, even though the constitutional text itself did not expressly use the phrase suo motu.

== Judicial use ==
Article 184(3) was used in a wide variety of constitutional and human rights disputes, including cases concerning bonded labour, missing persons, governance, elections, corruption, and the powers of public authorities. By the 2000s and 2010s, the clause had become one of the most discussed features of Pakistani constitutional law because it allowed the Supreme Court to sit as a court of first instance in matters framed as involving fundamental rights and public importance.

The breadth of that jurisdiction led to recurring debate over judicial activism and judicial restraint. The Constitution did not expressly confer a free-standing suo motu power in Article 184(3), but that successive benches of the Supreme Court developed such a practice through case law and procedure.

== Amendment and omission ==
For most of its history, Article 184(3) remained textually unchanged. Reform came first through ordinary legislation and then through constitutional amendment.

In 2023, Parliament enacted the Supreme Court (Practice and Procedure) Act, 2023, which created a 30-day appeal from orders passed under Article 184(3) to a larger bench of the Supreme Court.

On October 21, 2024, the Twenty-sixth Amendment inserted a proviso into Article 184(3) and also added Article 191A, under which only Constitutional Benches of the Supreme Court could exercise the original jurisdiction under Article 184. Pending petitions, appeals and review applications falling within that jurisdiction were to stand transferred to those benches.

On November 13, 2025, the Twenty-seventh Amendment omitted Article 184 entirely. At the same time, new Article 175E(3) conferred substantially the same public-importance fundamental-rights jurisdiction on the Federal Constitutional Court, while Article 175E(4) transferred pending petitions, appeals and review applications from the Supreme Court and its Constitutional Benches to the new court.

Date	Measure	Effect on Article 184(3)
August 14, 1973	Constitution of Pakistan came into force	Article 184(3) took effect as part of the original constitutional text, granting the Supreme Court special original jurisdiction in public-importance fundamental-rights matters.
1988	Benazir Bhutto v Federation of Pakistan (PLD 1988 SC 416)	The Supreme Court gave the clause a broad reading and relaxed traditional rules of standing in suitable public-interest cases.
1990	Darshan Masih v The State (PLD 1990 SC 513)	The clause became closely associated with human-rights petitions based on informal complaints and with the later growth of suo motu practice.
April 2023	Supreme Court (Practice and Procedure) Act, 2023	Created a statutory right of appeal from an order passed under Article 184(3).
October 21, 2024	Twenty-sixth Amendment	Added a proviso limiting suo motu action beyond the contents of an application, and routed Article 184 jurisdiction to Constitutional Benches of the Supreme Court.
November 13, 2025	Twenty-seventh Amendment	Omitted Article 184 and transferred the equivalent jurisdiction to the Federal Constitutional Court under Article 175E(3).

== Current equivalent ==
Under the Constitution as amended through November 21, 2025, the functional successor to Article 184(3) is Article 175E(3), which gives the Federal Constitutional Court power to make orders of the nature mentioned in Article 199 where it considers that a question of public importance with reference to the enforcement of fundamental rights is involved. Unlike late Article 184(3), Article 175E(3) provides that, subject to the Court's satisfaction, the jurisdiction "shall only be exercised if an application is filed by a person in that Court."

== See also ==
- Article 199 of the Constitution of Pakistan
- Benazir Bhutto v Federation of Pakistan
- Darshan Masih v The State
