= Ishaq Dar =

Prime Minister of Pakistan

- اسحاق ڈار
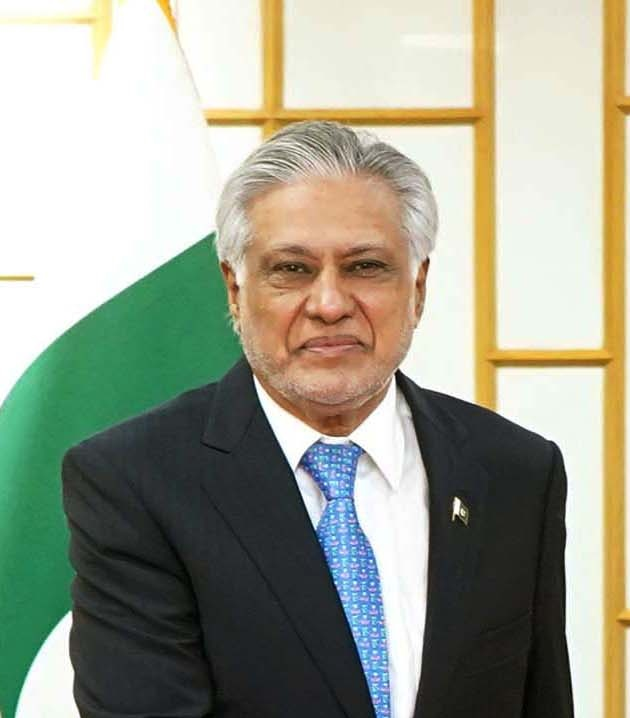
- Dar in 2025

6th Deputy Prime Minister of Pakistan
- Incumbent
- Assumed office 28 April 2024
- President: Asif Ali Zardari
- Prime Minister: Shehbaz Sharif
- Preceded by: Parvez Elahi

39th Minister for Foreign Affairs
- Incumbent
- Assumed office 11 March 2024
- President: Asif Ali Zardari
- Prime Minister: Shehbaz Sharif
- Preceded by: Jalil Abbas Jilani

Minister of Finance
- In office 28 September 2022 – 10 August 2023
- President: Arif Alvi
- Prime Minister: Shehbaz Sharif
- Preceded by: Miftah Ismail
- Succeeded by: Shamshad Akhtar
- In office 7 June 2013 – 22 November 2017
- President: Mamnoon Hussain
- Prime Minister: Nawaz Sharif; Shahid Khaqan Abbasi
- Preceded by: Mir Hazar Khan Khoso (Acting)
- Succeeded by: Miftah Ismail
- In office 31 March 2008 – 13 May 2008
- President: Pervez Musharraf
- Prime Minister: Yusuf Raza Gillani
- Preceded by: Salman Shah
- Succeeded by: Naveed Qamar
- In office 7 November 1998 – 12 October 1999
- President: Wasim Sajjad; Muhammad Rafiq Tarar
- Prime Minister: Nawaz Sharif
- Preceded by: Sartaj Aziz
- Succeeded by: Shaukat Aziz

Leader of the House for the Senate of Pakistan
- Incumbent
- Assumed office 30 September 2022
- President: Arif Alvi; Asif Ali Zardari
- Prime Minister: Shehbaz Sharif; Anwaar ul Haq Kakar; Shehbaz Sharif
- Preceded by: Azam Nazeer Tarar

Member of the Senate of Pakistan
- Incumbent
- Assumed office 28 September 2022
- Constituency: Punjab (until 2 April 2024); Islamabad Capital Territory (from 2 April 2024)
- In office March 2003 – March 2018
- Constituency: Punjab

Leader of the Opposition (Pakistan)
- In office 14 March 2012 – 4 June 2013
- Preceded by: Abdul Ghafoor Haideri
- Succeeded by: Aitzaz Ahsan

Minister of Commerce and Textile Industry
- In office 25 December 1997 – 12 October 1999
- President: Farooq Leghari; Wasim Sajjad; Muhammad Rafiq Tarar
- Prime Minister: Nawaz Sharif
- Preceded by: Ahmad Mukhtar
- Succeeded by: Abdul Razak Dawood

15th Minister of Industries
- In office 25 February 1997 – 11 July 1997
- President: Farooq Leghari
- Prime Minister: Nawaz Sharif
- Preceded by: Sadiq N. K. Awan
- Succeeded by: Khalid Maqbool Siddiqui

Personal details
- Born: 13 May 1950 (age 76) Lahore, Punjab, Pakistan
- Party: PML(N) (1997–present)
- Spouse: Tabassum Ishaq
- Education: Hailey College of Commerce (B.Com)
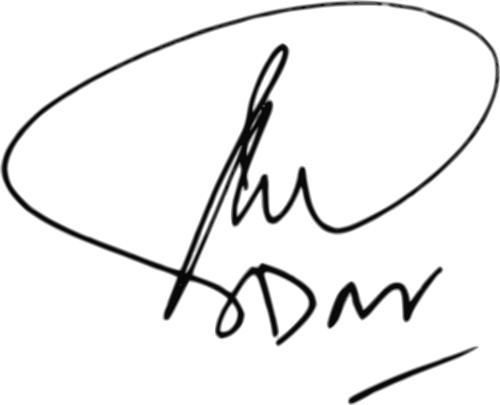
- Signature

Mohammad Ishaq Dar (Note: Punjabi, Urdu: محمد اسحاق ڈار ISO: Muḥammad Isḥāq Ḍār) (born 13 May 1950) is a Pakistani accountant and politician who has served as the 6th deputy prime minister and 39th foreign minister of Pakistan since 2024.

A close aide of the Sharif family, Dar is affiliated with the PML-N and previously served as the finance minister from 2022 to 2023, leader of the House for the Senate in 2022, and Leader of the Opposition for the Senate of Pakistan from 2012 to 2013. He was re-elected as a senator on a technocrat seat from Islamabad in the 2024 Pakistani Senate elections. He is a proponent of a set of economic policies now known as Daronomics.

Ishaq Dar was born in 1950 in Lahore. He attended the Hailey College of Commerce and graduated with a B.Com. He began his career as a chartered accountant in the public and private sector. He entered politics in the 1980s. He was elected to the senate in 2003 and was Leader of the Opposition from 2012 to 2013. He has served as federal minister for commerce; industries and investment; and finance and revenue.

== Early life and education ==
Dar was born on 13 May 1950 in Lahore, in Punjab, Pakistan, into a Kashmiri Muslim family that had long settled in Punjab.

He has a bachelor's degree in Commerce from the Hailey College of Commerce of the University of the Punjab in Lahore, which he attended from 1966 to 1969. He then attended Government College University in Lahore. Dar was awarded two merit gold medals and was placed on the roll of honour for coming in first position in Bachelor of Commerce (B. Com. (Hons.)) at the University of the Punjab.

== Accounting career ==
Dar became an Associate Member of the Institute of Chartered Accountants in England and Wales in 1974, when he qualified as a chartered accountant. In 1975, he became associate member of the Institute of Chartered Accountants of Pakistan. He became a fellow of the Institute of Chartered Accountants in England and Wales in 1980 and of Institute of Chartered Accountants of Pakistan in 1984. Currently, he is a fellow member of the Pakistan Institute of Public Finance Accountants and Institute of Chartered Accountants in England and Wales.

Professionally, Dar is a chartered and management accountant and economist. Dar was director of finance in a London-based textile corporation from 1974 to 1976. Hired by Colonel Muammar Gaddafi, he moved to Libya in 1976 and worked for the Government of Libya as senior auditor in the Office of the Auditor General's Department in Tripoli.

On returning to Pakistan in 1977, he became a partner in a chartered accountancy firm and in 1980, he became financial adviser to Nazir & Company, a multinational construction company.

== Political career ==
=== Entry into politics and first Sharif ministry ===
Dar began his political career in the late 1980s as a member of the central executive committee of the Pakistan Muslim League (N) (PML(N)). According to a statement from Dar recorded by the National Accountability Bureau (NAB) when he was detained following the 1999 Pakistani coup d'état, he began a close association with the Sharif family in 1990, in the course of which he laundered "$14.68 million and opened two bank accounts under the names of Sikandar Masood Qazi and Talat Masood Qazi for Nawaz Sharif's brother".

In 1992, then–Prime Minister Nawaz Sharif appointed him as Chairman of the Pakistan Board of Investment with the status of Minister of State. In 1993, the then President of Pakistan, Ghulam Ishaq Khan, dismissed the Sharif ministry. He became President of the Lahore Chamber of Commerce and Industry that same year.

Dar first stood for the National Assembly in a by-election after the 1993 Pakistani general election; Sharif had stood and won in two constituencies but had to resign from one. Dar won on a 62% voteshare (39,483 votes). In 1996, the President, Farooq Leghari, dismissed the Prime Minister Benazir Bhutto and her government, and dissolved the National Assembly.

=== Role in the second Sharif ministry ===
In the 1997 general election, Dar successfully stood for election to Lahore's NA-97 National Assembly constituency on a PML(N) ticket and won 61,556 votes. Sharif's PML(N) again won a clear majority, and Dar was Federal Minister for Industries and Investment in from February to July 1997.

In December 1997, he was appointed Federal Minister for Commerce. In 1998, India and then Pakistan tested nuclear weapons; Pakistan was subsequently economically sanctioned, with severe economic consequences. Dar was then appointed Minister for Finance, and negotiated an International Monetary Fund (IMF) bailout package.

=== Military rule ===
In 1999, General Pervez Musharraf overthrew the Sharif ministry in a military coup d'état. Dar spent nearly two years in jail on corruption charges that never went to trial. Dar withstood pressure to politically abandon the PML(N) and Sharif, but during his detention in 2000, Dar accused Nawaz Sharif of having engaged in money laundering in the late 1990s and, in connection with the Hudabya Papers Mills case, Dar confessed to laundering US$14.86 million on behalf of the Nawaz Sharif. He later said these statements were made under duress. On his release, Musharraf remained in power, and Dar moved to the United Arab Emirates, where he worked as a financial adviser. His clients included a member of the ruling family. In 2002, he was made President of PML(N)'s International Affairs wing.

After several months outside Pakistan, Dar returned to Pakistan in 2003 to run for a seat in the Senate as a candidate of PML(N) and was elected for the first time, for a term of three years. During his tenure as Member of the Senate, he served as Parliamentary Leader of the PML(N) in the Senate. He was re-elected to the Senate in the 2006 senate election as a candidate of PML(N), this time for a term of six years. During his tenure as Member of the Senate between 2003 and 2012, he remained the Parliamentary Leader of the PML(N) in the Senate.

=== Minister of Finance (2008) ===
After the formation of a coalition government between the PPP and PML(N) with Yousaf Raza Gillani as Prime Minister, following the 2008 general election, which had resulted in a hung parliament where the PPP had secured the largest number of seats in the National Assembly and the PML(N) the second largest, Dar due to his expertise in finance and economics, was invited to join the cabinet of Yousaf Raza Gillani with the status of a federal minister in March 2008 and was re-appointed as the Minister for Finance with the additional cabinet portfolio of revenue, economic affairs and statistics. However, his tenure as Minister for Finance was short-lived after the PML(N) left the PPP-led coalition government in May 2008 to lead the movement to impeach Pervez Musharraf and to restore the judiciary after the coalition failed to restore the judiciary, as agreed between PML(N) and PPP in the Bhurban Accord. During his brief tenure as finance minister, he was criticized for causing the rupee fall, bank run and panic in the market. Meanwhile, he has been credited for proposing the idea of the Benazir Income Support Programme, a Pakistani government aid program to provide financial assistance to low-income families which is said to be one of the largest in South Asia. Dar claimed that the original name of the organisation proposed was Pakistan Income Support Programme but that it was renamed by PPP for political gains after he stepped down form the ministerial office.

In 2011 Dar was decorated with Nishan-e-Imtiaz, the highest civil award given to Pakistani nationals, for his parliamentary service in Pakistan. However, he refused to receive it from the then-President, Asif Ali Zardari. Dar was re-elected to the Senate for the third time in the 2012 senate election, for six years as a candidate of PML(N) on technocrat seat from Punjab after which he was re-appointed by Nawaz Sharif as the Parliamentary Leader of the PML(N) in the Senate. A few days later he was elected as the Leader of the Opposition in the Senate, replacing Abdul Ghafoor Haideri for his negotiation skills with PPP government on major issues. During his tenure as Member of the Senate, he remained member of the various Standing Committees of Senate such as defence and defence production, foreign affairs, Kashmir affairs and Gilgit-Baltistan, commerce and finance, revenue, economic affairs, statistics, planning and development and privatisation. He also served as a member of the Special Committee on Constitutional Reforms, and co-prepared and passed the 18th, the 19th, and the 20th amendments to the Constitution of Pakistan.

=== Minister of Finance (2013-2017) ===
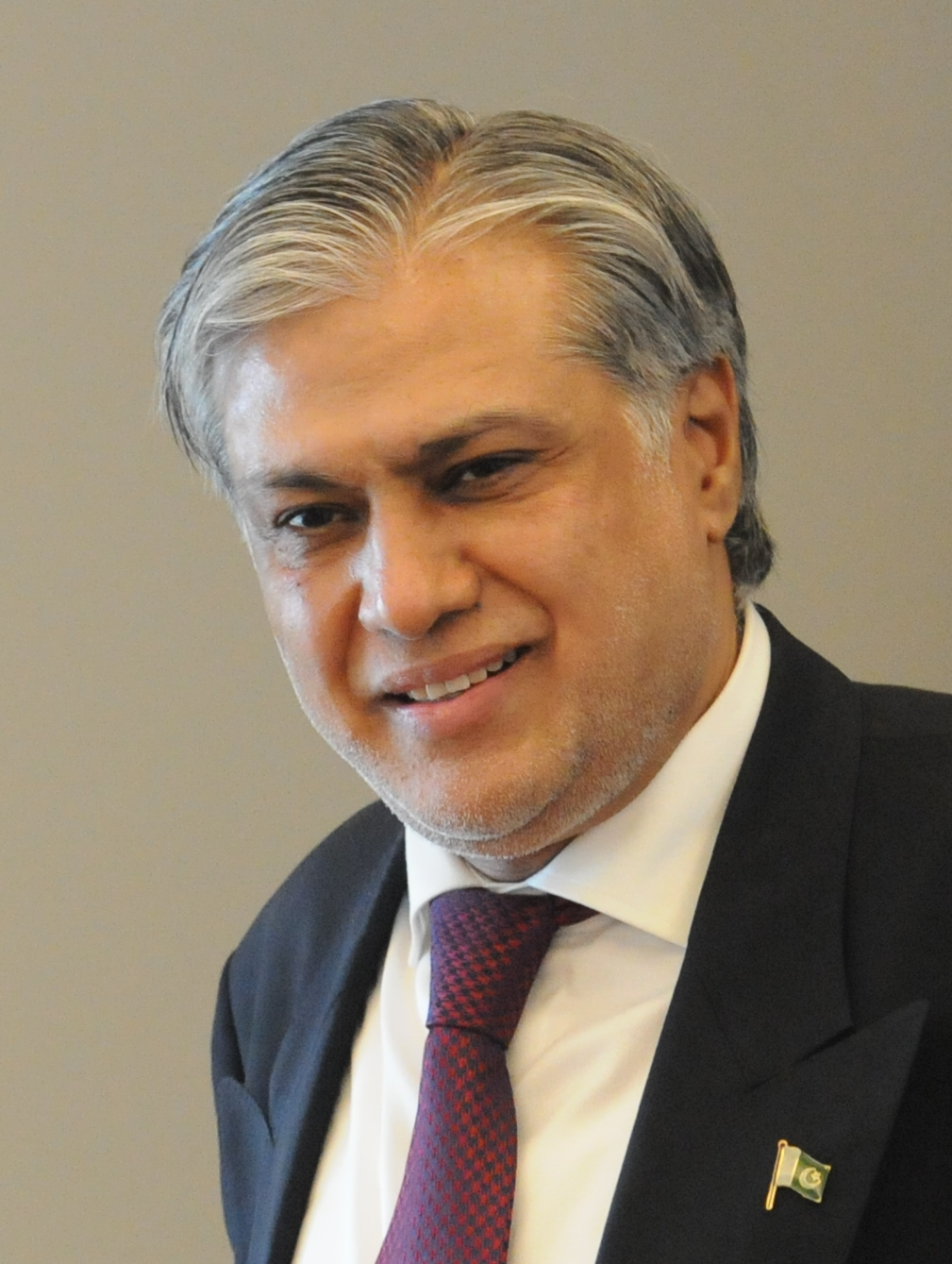
Dar while speaking at event, held at U.S. Institute of Peace in 2014

Dar was a member of the PML(N)'s parliamentary board, charged with the selection of candidates for the 2013 general election. The PML(N) won a majority, and Dar resigned as leader of the opposition in the Senate. He became Minister for Finance and was given the additional cabinet portfolios of Revenue, Economic Affairs, Statistics and Privatisation. He chaired the Special Parliamentary Committee on Election Reforms and the Economic Coordination Committee (ECC). With Maryam Nawaz, he deputed for the Prime Minister whilst he underwent surgery in the United Kingdom. Dawn reported that he headed over "four dozen" committees. In July 2016, the NAB cleared Dar of allegations of corruption involving over Rs 130 billion. Pakistan Today reported that a source in the NAB alleged "immense pressure" to clear Dar, even though there was sufficient evidence to convict him.

In October 2016, the Finance Ministry announced that the IMF conferred the "Finance Minister of the Year for South Asia" award to Dar. Dar was issued the award by an independent publication unaffiliated with the IMF but funded by five Pakistani state-owned firms.

In July 2017, the Supreme Court disqualified both Dar and Sharif from office, following the publication of the Panama Papers. Sharif's successor, Shahid Khaqan Abbasi, reappointed him as Finance Minister despite the ruling, but reduced his powers. Dar was replaced as the chair of the ECC and a committee on privatisation. The finance ministry was split. The Nation reported that Dar wished to leave the cabinet but that it was impossible to relieve him of all responsibility immediately due to the extent of his former responsibilities. Abbasi also removed Dar from the chairmanship of 35 committees of the National Assembly, thus further reducing Dar's influence. Pakistan Today quoted a source claiming that Sharif had ordered the reduction of Dar's influence. In September 2017 a NAB court in Pakistan indicted Dar in the Panama Papers corruption case for having wealth beyond his known sources of income, but, despite criticism from the opposition parties, he continued to serve as finance minister. In October 2017 he fell ill while in Saudi Arabia and left for the United Kingdom for medical treatment.

In November 2017 the court issued a non-bailable arrest warrant for him while he was in London for not appearing in court. It was reported that it was possible he would lose his ministerial portfolio due to the corruption case against him on the grounds that he has become ineffective and unable to carry out the responsibilities of a Minister. On 21 November a court declared him an absconder. Amid the rumours that he had already resigned from the ministerial office due to pressure and criticism, he resigned on 22 November after taking medical leave. His cabinet portfolio of Finance Minister was withdrawn. However, he continued to remain a member of the federal cabinet as a federal minister without portfolio. It was noted that Dar has refused to leave the Finance Ministry and that he took a temporary medical leave for three months after which he may retake the office upon his return to Pakistan.

Dar was credited with stabilising the economy after the 2013 balance of payments crisis locally and internationally, but critics also alleged he had failed to implement structural reforms and manipulated statistics. in particularly steering country out of balance of payments crisis in 2013. Dar borrowed $35 billion from foreign lenders.

In December 2017, an accountability court declared Dar a proclaimed offender in a corruption case after he repeatedly failed to appear before the court, and the court subsequently deemed him a fugitive.

On 26 December, Abbasi promoted his special assistant on Economic Affairs Miftah Ismail to Adviser on Finance, Revenue and Economic Affairs with the status of a federal minister, succeeding Dar. Abbasi continued to hold office as minister of finance until January 2018.

=== In opposition ===
In February 2018, the name of Dar was shortlisted by PML(N) amongst the candidate for March 2018 Senate election after which Dar filed his nomination papers for a general seat and a technocrat seat in the Senate. However the Election Commission of Pakistan (ECP) rejected his nomination papers. On 17 February, Lahore High Court granted permission to Dar to participate in the Senate elections. On 22 February, the ECP declared all PML(N) candidates for the Senate election as independent after a ruling of the Supreme Court. On 3 March 2018, he was re-elected to the Senate as an independent candidate on technocrat seat from Punjab with the backing by PML(N). On 12 March 2018, he ceased to hold the position of a federal minister due to expiration of his Senate term.

In May 2018, the Supreme Court ordered the ECP to suspend the notification of Senator-elect Dar as member of the Senate for his failure to appear before the court. As of June 2018, he did not take oath of Senator. In June 2018, the ECP suspended the Senate membership of Dar. On 10 July, the Supreme Court ordered Dar to appear before court within three days. Interpol Red Notice for Dar was issued by the government of Pakistan on 14 July to bring him back to Pakistan.

In August 2018, the National Accountability Bureau approved an inquiry into a graft case against Dar for illegally awarding a Next Generation Mobile Services contract and for committing alleged financial irregularities. In September, his passport was cancelled by the government of Pakistan making him a stateless person. The same month, a British parliamentary team rejected an online petition seeking the deportation of Dar on the ground that there is no extradition treaty between the two countries.

=== Minister of Finance (2022–2023) ===
Dar was appointed minister of finance in September 2022 and served until August 2023. His tenure coincided with a challenging economic period, marked by high inflation and the need for International Monetary Fund (IMF) assistance. In January 2023, Dar sought US assistance in obtaining IMF funding in view of recent floods and adverse economic conditions.

Imran Khan's administration had previously initiated negotiations with the IMF for a bailout program, but these talks stalled before his departure in April 2022.

During Dar's tenure, Pakistan experienced high inflation peaking at 37.97% and significant interest rate hikes reaching 21%. These developments can be attributed, according to some critics, to the policy requirements of the IMF program.

Dar's approach involved advocating for market intervention to stabilize the Pakistani rupee, a strategy that reportedly differed from the IMF's recommendations. Additionally, he publicly criticized the IMF during negotiations, potentially impacting the process.

Pakistan faced a seven-month-long struggle to release the remaining tranches of its final $6.5 billion bailout program. Despite delays, Dar negotiated a deal with the IMF, with Prime Minister Shehbaz Sharif playing a pivotal role in finalizing the agreement.

In 2023, he was nominee of position of Caretaker Prime Minister of Pakistan before being ruled out in favour of Anwaar-ul-Haq Kakar.

=== Foreign Minister (2024–present) ===
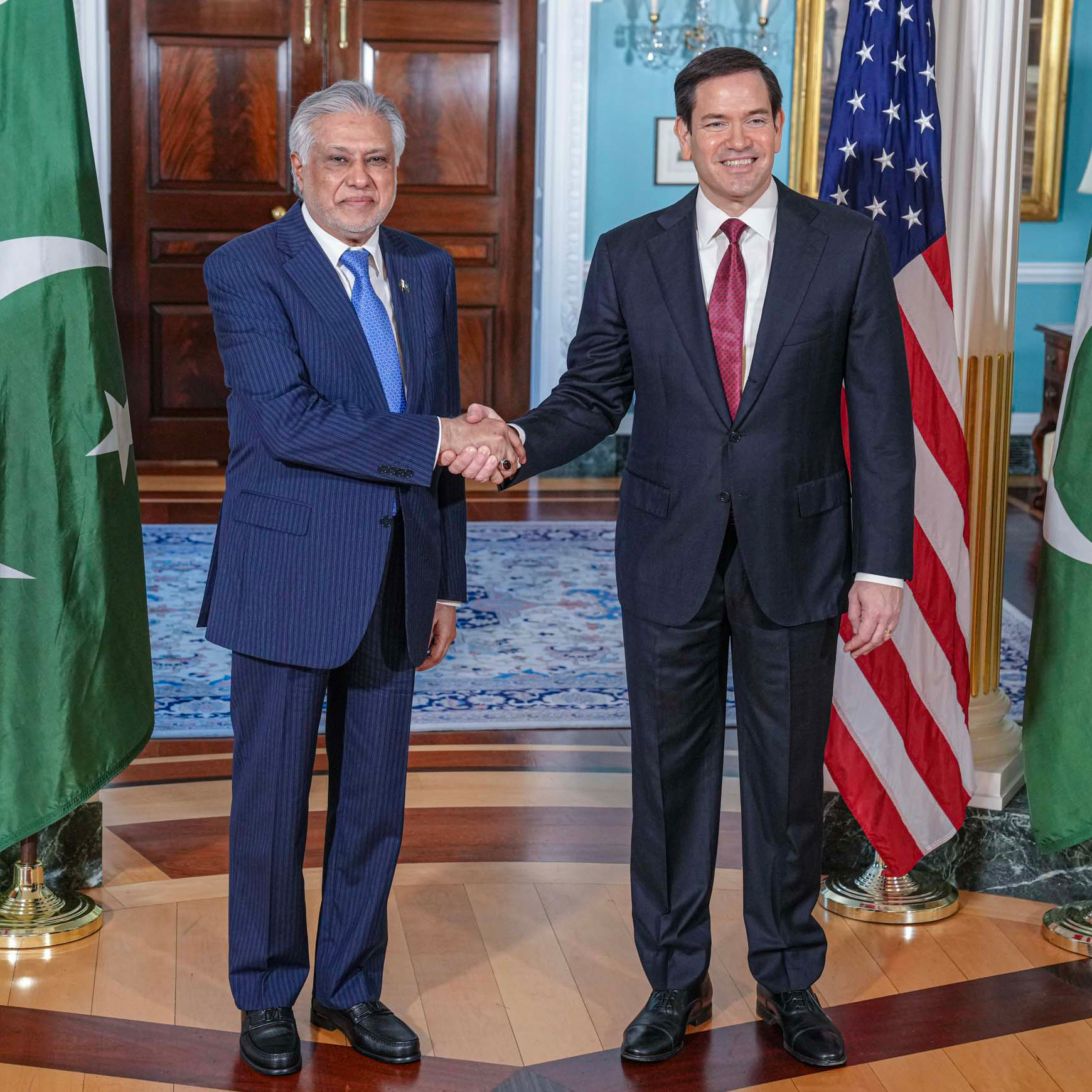
Dar with United States Secretary of State Marco Rubio in Washington, D.C., July 2025

During the 2024 election campaign, Ishaq Dar's policies were heavily criticized. He was blamed for mismanaging the government response to the ongoing economic crisis. This led to the speculation that he may be nominated as Chairman of the Senate. However, the power-sharing formula following the coalition agreement between PPP and PMLN resulted in senate chairmanship being allotted to PPP and National Assembly speakership being given to PMLN. Hence, he was sworn-in as a federal minister. He was appointed as the 38th Foreign Minister of Pakistan the following day. This emphasizes Shehbaz administration's shifting focus towards a geoeconomic foreign policy. His senate term ended the day he took charge of the foreign ministry. In the 2024 Pakistani Senate election, he sought reelection. During the Senate elections on 2 April 2024, he secured victory for a technocrat seat representing Islamabad by receiving 222 votes.

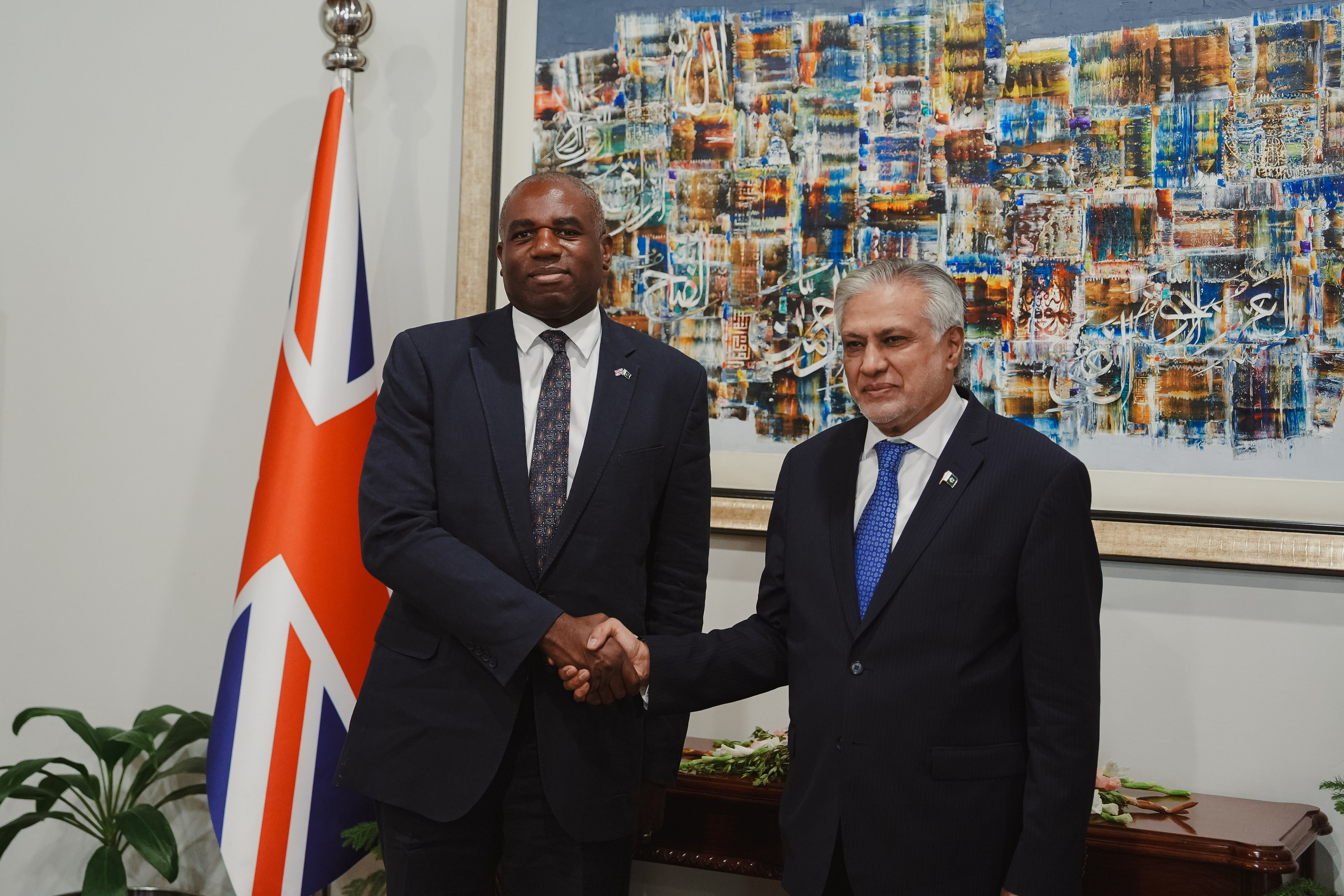
Dar with British Foreign Secretary David Lammy in Islamabad a few days after Pakistan's brief conflict with India, May 2025

Dar expressed intentions to thoroughly assess the trade situation with India following concerns raised by the business community. Bilateral trade between the two countries has been on hold since August 2019, due to tensions sparked by India's move to revoke Kashmir's special status.

Dar conveyed his concerns about terrorist hideouts in neighboring Afghanistan to the country's Interim Foreign Minister, Amir Khan Muttaqi, following the North Waziristan terror attack on the Pakistan Army, resulting in the deaths of seven security force members. He expressed disappointment at the perceived lack of substantial action from Afghanistan in addressing terrorist groups operating from its territory.

On 28 April 2024, Dar was given the additional charge of Deputy Prime Minister of Pakistan.

Dar described the killings in Gaza as a "genocide" of Palestinians and called for an "immediate and unconditional" ceasefire.

In October 2024, Ishaq Dar replaced Musadik Malik as Chairman of Sugar Monitoring Committee. Business Recorder commented that Dar was to take "lenient" decisions compared to "harsh" attitude. The Express Tribune wrote that Malik had been "vocal in his criticism of sugar millers for violating the export conditions imposed by the government." Dar was also placed as Chairman of the Iran-Pakistan gas line project.

In July 2025, Dar addressed the 32nd ASEAN Regional Forum (ARF), calling for enhanced global cooperation to address emerging non-traditional security threats such as climate change, cyber risks, pandemics, and maritime security. He reaffirmed Pakistan's support for ASEAN's strategic vision outlined in the Kuala Lumpur Declaration on ASEAN 2045. Dar also highlighted regional tensions, reiterating Pakistan's position on the Jammu and Kashmir dispute and calling for adherence to international law and preventive diplomacy. His remarks came amid growing regional strain following India's Operation Sindoor and the indefinite suspension of the Indus Waters Treaty, which have placed Pakistan's foreign policy under heightened pressure in multilateral forums.

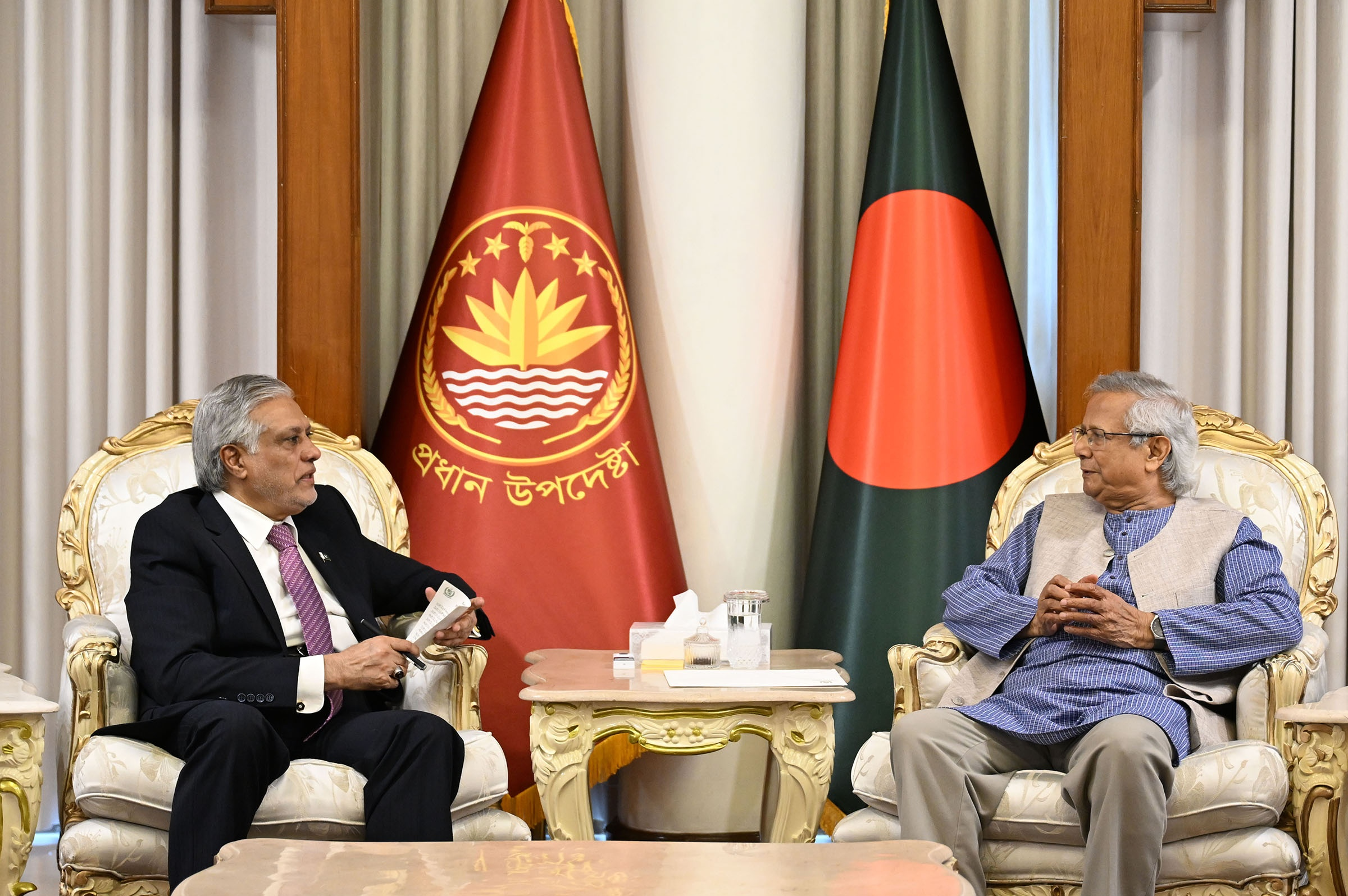
Dar with Bangladeshi Chief Adviser Muhammad Yunus in Dhaka, August 2025

In August 2025, Dar visited Bangladesh, a year after Bangladesh's July Revolution, in which Sheikh Hasina was ousted from power. Dar was the first senior Pakistani official to visit Bangladesh since 2012, signalling a major diplomatic reset amid Bangladesh's icing relations with neighbouring India.

In September 2025, during an interview with Al Jazeera, Ishaq Dar contradicted Donald Trump's claim that Washington had brokered peace between India and Pakistan during the 2025 India-Pakistan conflict. Dar said that when a ceasefire offer was relayed by Secretary Marco Rubio on 10 May, it was suggested that talks with India would follow at an "independent place". However, during a meeting on 25 July in Washington, Rubio told him that India considered the matter a bilateral issue implying that mediation was declined.

In November 2025, Ishaq Dar met with NATO Secretary General Mark Rutte in Brussels to discuss deeper cooperation on regional security, counterterrorism, and the strengthening of the Pakistan–NATO partnership.

During the 2026 Afghanistan–Pakistan War, Ishaq Dar served as the primary diplomatic figure, managing the fallout of escalated border hostilities and coordinating Pakistan's international response. Following the intensification of border clashes in February 2026, Dar focused on intense diplomatic efforts to manage the crisis while maintaining a firm stance on national sovereignty.

In March 2026, Ishaq Dar condemned the joint Israeli-American strikes on Iran. Citing the September 2025 bilateral Strategic Mutual Defence Agreement, Dar warned Tehran against retaliation targeting Saudi Arabia.

On April 11th 2026, Ishaq Dar welcomed Both the US and Iran delegation for peace talks in Islamabad. After the conclusion of peace talks, Dar expressed hope that both the sides would maintain communication and uphold the ceasefire

In May 2026, during US–Iran talks mediated by Pakistan, U.S. President Donald Trump stated that Pakistan and several other Muslim-majority countries would join the Abraham Accords as part of a broader agreement with Iran. Dar subsequently rejected speculation that Pakistan might normalize relations with Israel, reaffirming Pakistan's longstanding position that it would not recognize Israel until the establishment of an independent Palestinian state based on the pre-1967 borders, with East Jerusalem as its capital.

== Daronomics ==
Ishaq Dar served as finance minister of Pakistan across four terms, implementing economic policies known as Daronomics. These policies included maintaining a fixed dollar-rupee exchange rate, supported by foreign currency loans, keeping the State Bank of Pakistan's policy rate low, and managing inflation through subsidies and cheap imports. While aimed at regulating the economy, these measures faced criticism for lacking long-term sustainability.

During his 1998–1999 term, Dar responded to a devaluation crisis by confiscating $11 billion from local dollar accounts, converting them at the official rate of Rs 46 per dollar. This led overseas Pakistanis to rely on informal remittance channels. His 2013–2017 tenure focused on stabilizing the exchange rate by injecting dollars into the market, which ultimately worsened the current account deficit and contributed to Pakistan's 2019 IMF bailout.

== Personal life ==
=== Family ===
He is regarded as the most trusted aide of the Sharif family. In 2004, Dar's eldest son married Nawaz Sharif's daughter Asma Nawaz in Jeddah, Saudi Arabia.

=== Philanthropy ===
Dar runs two charitable organisations, the Hajveri Foundation and the Hajveri Trust. These organizations are named after Ali al-Hujwiri, an 11th-century Persian Islamic scholar and Sufi; Dar regularly visits his shrine, Data Darbar in Lahore, and has identified with Sufi teachings. These trusts are aimed to provide shelter to the homeless children or orphans, provide student scholarships and organize mass wedding ceremonies for the less privileged.

=== Business ===
Dar's declared assets stand at PKR. 583 million and investments at PKR. 325 million in Pakistan Investment Bonds. As of February 2022, all his personal assets, assets belonging to his family and those owned by his charitable organizations have been unfrozen under court orders.
