= Military Courts (Pakistan) =

- Jurisdiction: Pakistan
- Authorised by: Pakistan Army Act of 1952
- Appeals to: N/A

Military courts in Pakistan are special courts in the country's judicial system and are set up to try civilians, especially in cases related to terrorism. These courts were established under the Pakistan Army Act 1952 as a response to the growing threat of terrorism and insurgency in the country.

== History ==
The history of military courts in Pakistan dates back to the early years of the country's existence. The first military tribunal was set up in 1951 to try the perpetrators of the Rawalpindi Conspiracy Case. The Military Tribunal sentenced all the convicts in the Rawalpindi Conspiracy Case to long imprisonment.

In 1953, martial law was declared due to the worsening law and order situation in Punjab, especially in Lahore. Trials of leaders of the anti-Ahmadiyya movement, Maulana Abdul Sattar Khan Niazi and Maulana Abul A'la Maududi were initiated by military courts, and both were sentenced to death. However, with the lifting of martial law in May 1953, the death sentences handed down by the military court were also nullified.

Military Courts were again set up in Pakistan in the aftermath of the 2014 Peshawar school massacre to dispense speedy justice to terrorists. The move was enabled by the passage of the 21st Constitutional Amendment in 2015 with a sunset clause of 2 years. In January 2017, at the end of the originally stipulated period, a further amendment was made to the constitution to allow the military courts to function for two more years. That provision of the amendment expired in January 2019 and hasn't since been renewed.

The trials in these courts are conducted under the Judge Advocate General (JAG) branch of the Pakistan Army in which the judges and prosecutors are all serving military officers with no formal legal training.

== Structure and composition ==
Military courts, in contrast to civilian courts, are operated by military staff, which includes judges and legal professionals. These individuals are members of the Pakistan Army, Navy, and Air Force. In addition to judges, other military personnel also have a significant influence on the decision-making process within these courts.

== Notable cases ==
After Imran Khan's arrest on 9 May 2023 from within Islamabad High Court, there were protests in many parts of the country. In some instances protestors attacked military installations, including the General Headquarters (GHQ) in Rawalpindi and Corps Commander House at Lahore. Several thousand Pakistan Tehreek-e-Insaf leaders and workers were arrested in relation to rioting and attacks on military installations, of which 102 defendants had their cases shifted from anti-terrorism courts to military courts. This decision was strongly opposed by human rights organizations and legal experts.

== Controversy and criticism ==
=== Human rights issues ===
The use of military courts to try civilians has been the subject of controversy and criticism. Human Rights Watch (HRW) and Amnesty International have urged Pakistan not to prosecute civilians in military courts. They argue that the trial of civilians in military courts is a violation of Pakistan's obligations under international human rights law to ensure the rights of criminals to due process and fair trial. HRW has documented a catalog of human rights abuses stemming from the prosecution of civilians in military courts in Pakistan, including a clear disregard for due process, lack of transparency, coerced confessions, and executions after extremely unfair trials.

The opaqueness of the military justice system has been criticized, including by the United Nations and International Commission of Jurists. The proceedings are conducted within military establishments in secrecy and defendants only have the right to appeal the verdict of a military court to a military appellate tribunal, whose decision in turn is deemed final and cannot even be challenged in the higher civil courts of Pakistan.

=== Amendments Case ===
In the 2015 District Bar Association (Rawalpindi) v Federation of Pakistan case, the question of "unconstitutional constitutional amendments" was put before a 17-member bench of the Supreme Court of Pakistan that challenged specific clauses of the 18th and 21st amendments. Namely, the anti-defection and judicial appointment clauses of the former and the military tribunal cover provided in the latter.

The court, in a landmark verdict described by legal experts as the most important constitutional law decision in the history of Pakistan, ruled that:

1. With a majority of 13 to 04 the Constitution Petitions were held to be maintainable. Thus allowing for judicial review of the amendments with the view being that of the basic structure doctrine. In essence, providing a check on the power of the parliament to amend the constitution.
2. With a majority of 14 to 03 the Constitution Petitions challenging the Eighteenth Amendment were dismissed.
3. With a majority of 11 to 06 the Constitution Petitions challenging the Twenty-first Amendment and the Pakistan Army (Amendment) Act (2015) were dismissed. This allowed for the continuation of the military courts. The 6 dissenting judges, who deemed the military courts as unconstitutional, were Jawwad S. Khawaja, Asif Saeed Khosa, Ejaz Afzal Khan, Ijaz Ahmed Chaudhry, Dost Muhammad Khan, and Qazi Faez Isa.

=== Military Courts Case ===
In October 2023, the Supreme Court of Pakistan invalidated the trial of civilians in military courts. The court ordered that the accused in the May 2023 violence-related cases be tried under ordinary criminal laws.
