= 2016–17 Pakistan federal budget =

2016–17 Federal Budget
[View ]
- Submitted by: Ishaq Dar
- Submitted to: National Assembly
- Presented: June 3, 2016
- Parliament: Pakistan
- Party: PML(N)
- Finance minister: Ishaq Dar
- Treasurer: Ministry of Finance
- Website: 2015–16 Budget

The Federal budget 2016–17 is the federal budget of Pakistan for the fiscal year beginning from 1 July 2016 and ending on 30 June 2017. The budget was presented in the Parliament by the Minister of Finance, Ishaq Dar on June 3, 2015.
