= Constitution Monument (Pakistan) =

Monument in Islamabad, Pakistan

- Yadgar-e-Dastur
- Location: Islamabad, Pakistan
- Type: Monument
- Beginning date: 10 April 2023
- Completion date: 29 February 2024
- Dedicated to: Golden Jubilee of the 1973 Constitution

The Constitution Monument (also known as Yadgar-e-Dastur) is a landmark located in Islamabad, Pakistan. It was built to commemorate the Golden Jubilee of the 1973 Constitution of the Islamic Republic of Pakistan. The monument embodies the sanctity of the 1973 Constitution and its towering plaques enshrine the Preamble and Fundamental Rights.

== History ==
The decision to construct the Constitution Monument was unanimously taken by the Advisory Committee set up to oversee the preparations for the Golden Jubilee of the 1973 Constitution. The foundation stone of the monument was laid on 10 April 2023. The memorial was inaugurated by then Speaker of the National Assembly, Raja Pervez Ashraf, on 29 February 2024.

The memorial is located opposite the Parliament Lodges on Jinnah Avenue. The location was selected after careful consideration of the proposals sent by the Capital Development Authority.
