= National Action Plan (Pakistan) =

Action plan to combat terrorism

The National Action Plan is an action plan that was established by the Government of Pakistan in December 2014 to crack down on terrorism and to supplement the ongoing anti-terrorist offensive in Federally Administered Tribal Areas. It is considered as a major coordinated state response following the deadly 2014 Peshawar school attack. Following the national outrage over the targeted killing of schoolchildren in Peshawar by six Afghan and other foreign terrorists, the plan received unprecedented levels of support and co-operation across the country's political spectrum, inclusive of the federal and provincial governments.

The action plan combines foreign and domestic policy initiatives aimed at cracking down on and eventually eliminating proscribed organisations across the country. The plan was provided as the framework for the Twenty-first Amendment to the Constitution of Pakistan which established speedy trial military courts for offences relating to terrorism. It has also led to the mandatory re-verification through fingerprint recognition of all subscribers on mobile telephony, and to at least some instances where the capital punishment awarded by the courts was carried out.

The National Action Plan authorises the Foreign, Finance, and other ministerial departments to reach out to the friendly Muslim countries to clamp down on financiers of sectarian and terrorist networks operating against Pakistan.

== Background ==
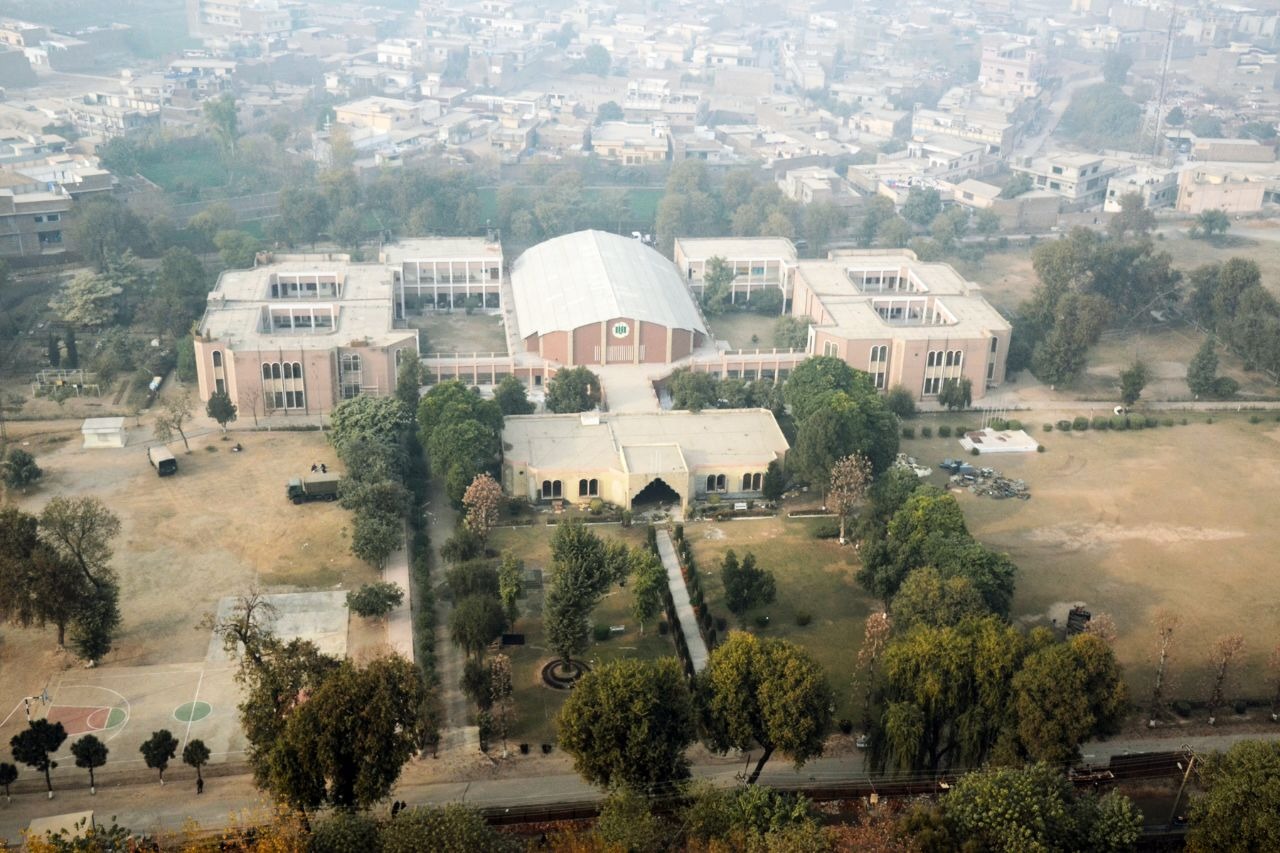
Army Public School Peshawar

On 16 December 2014, six gunmen affiliated with the Tehrik-i-Taliban Pakistan (TTP) conducted a terrorist attack on the Army Public School in the northwestern Pakistani city of Peshawar. The militants, all of whom were foreign nationals, included one Chechen, three Arabs and two Afghans. They entered the school and opened fire on school staff and children, killing 145 people, including 132 schoolchildren, ranging between eight and eighteen years of age. A rescue operation was launched by the Pakistan Army's Special Services Group (SSG) special forces, who killed all six terrorists and rescued 960 people.

== Establishment of the plan ==
On 24 December 2014 political parties conference chaired by the then Prime Minister of Pakistan reached consensus over the issue of setting up military courts for tackling terrorism cases in the country, along with a wider plan to tackle terrorism.

We have to act fast and whatever is agreed we have to implement it immediately...this agreement is a defining moment for Pakistan and we will eliminate terrorists from this country.

— Prime Minister Pakistan,

On 24 December the Prime Minister (PM) in a televised address to the nation announced the 'National Action Plan' (NAP) to deal with terrorism. According to the Interior Minister, the plan was prepared in the light of the decisions taken by All Parties Conference. For this purpose the PM established the National Action Committee, consisting of members from all the political parties and decisions were taken in the light of the recommendations of this committee. The PM's address gave the following outline of the National Action Plan, the points of which were decided in the APC.

The Pakistan Tehreek-e-Insaaf (PTI) called off the protests and participated in the APC. However, it abstained from voting on the bill and the amendment. Jamiat Ulema-e Islam (F) (JUI F) and Jamaat-e-Islami (JI) also abstained from voting. The JI proposed that the word religion should be omitted from the text of the bill, while the JUI found the mention of the word sect objectionable. The Pakistan Peoples Party (PPP) and Awami National Party (ANP) voted in favour of the bill and the amendment.

== The plan ==
- After the Peshawar incident, government decided to proceed with the execution of extremists convicted in terror related cases. The Government has already started implementation.
- Special courts, headed by the officers of the armed forces, will be established for the speedy trial of terrorists. These courts will be established for a term of two years.
- Formation of armed militia will not be allowed in the country.
- National Counter Terrorism Authority will be revived and made effective
- There will be a crackdown on hate-speech, and action will be taken against newspapers, magazines contributing to the spread of such speech.
- Financial sources of terrorists and terror organisation will be cut.
- Banned outfits will not be allowed to operate under different names.
- Special anti-terrorism force will be raised.
- Measures will be taken to stop religious extremism and to protect minorities.
- Madrassas will be regularised and reformed.
- Print and electronic media will not be allowed to give any space to terrorists.
- Keeping the rehabilitation of IDPs as the top-most priority, administrative and development reforms in FATA will be expedited.
- Communication systems of terrorist organisations will be destroyed.
- Social media and the Internet will not be allowed to be used by terrorists to spread propaganda and hate speech, though exact process for that will be finalised.
- Like the rest of the country, no space will be given to extremism in any part of the Punjab.
- Operation against terrorists in Karachi will be taken to its logical conclusion.
- In the interest of political reconciliation, Balochistan government will be given complete authority by all stakeholders.
- Elements spreading sectarian violence will be prosecuted.
- Comprehensive policy will be formed for registration and deportation of Afghan refugees.
- To give provincial intelligence agencies access to communication of terrorists and to strengthen anti-terror agencies through basic reforms in the criminal justice system. Constitutional amendments and legislation will be carried out for this purpose.

== Implementation ==
- Twenty-first Amendment to the Constitution of Pakistan passed on 7 January 2015.
- Over 50 cases of hardcore terrorists for prosecution in military courts send till 25 March 2015.
- 55,000 Afghan refugees expelled by between January and 23 March 2015.
- Lifted a seven-year-old moratorium on the executions of prisoners sentenced to death.
- Executions of 128 prisoners till March 2015.
- By March 2015, civilian and intelligence agencies had arrested 150 people, half of them clerics, in violation of laws.
- On 25 March 2015, Pakistan froze a number of accounts used to funnel Rs 10.2 billion in cash to terror suspects.
- Boundary walls of all schools up to 8 feet (2.4 m) and topping them with 2 feet (0.61 m) high razor wire.
- By 15 March 2015, Pakistan Telecommunication Authority (PTA), has verified more than 70 million SIM's and 11 million were blocked due to not having re-verification.
- From 24 December 2014 to 25 March 2015, law enforcement agencies arrested 32,347 people on different charges in 28,826 operations.
- On 3 April 2015, at least 76 suspects including two Afghan nationals were arrested in Peshawar.

== See also ==
- Authorization for Use of Military Force Against Terrorists
