= Seventh Amendment =

Seventh Amendment may refer to:

- Seventh Amendment of the Constitution of India, 1956 amendment which repealed the Part B States category and allowed retired judges in higher courts in cases of judiciary shortage
- Seventh Amendment of the Constitution of Ireland, which allows the Oireachtas to alter the procedure for the election of members of the Senate by graduates of specific universities
- Seventh Amendment to the Constitution of Pakistan, which allows the Prime Minister to request a vote of confidence to be held by way of a national referendum
- Seventh Amendment of the Constitution of South Africa, which altered various provisions relating to the handling of fiscal matters by Parliament and the financial aspect of the relationship between the national and provincial governments
- Seventh Amendment to the United States Constitution, which codifies the right to a jury trial in certain civil cases, and asserts that cases may not be re-examined by another court
