= Sadaqat Ali Khan =

Judge of the Lahore High Court

Judge of the Lahore High Court
- Incumbent
- Assumed office 29 October 2013

Personal details
- Born: 21 January 1967 (age 59)

Sadaqat Ali Khan (born 21 January 1967) is a Pakistani jurist and a judge of the Lahore High Court. He was appointed as an additional judge on 29 October 2013.

== Judicial career ==
Khan was appointed as an additional judge of the Lahore High Court (LHC) on 29 October 2013.

In December 2024, Khan issued a ruling concerning the applicability of the Official Secrets Act (OSA), holding that suspects arrested under the Act by military authorities do not need to be presented before a magistrate. He stated that while the OSA originally required suspects to be produced before a magistrate, subsequent amendments to the Pakistan Army Act rendered that requirement obsolete, placing such matters under the jurisdiction of military courts.

In November 2025, Khan headed a full bench of the LHC constituted to hear petitions challenging the Twenty-seventh Amendment to the Constitution of Pakistan.
