= Twenty-fourth Amendment =

The Twenty-fourth Amendment may refer to:

- Twenty-fourth Amendment of the Constitution of India (1971), granting parliament the power to amend any part of the constitution
- Twenty-fourth Amendment of the Constitution Bill 2001 (Ireland)
- Twenty-fourth Amendment to the Constitution of Pakistan (2017)
- Twenty-fourth Amendment to the United States Constitution (1964)
