= Twelfth Amendment to the Constitution of Pakistan =

Amendment to the Pakistani constitution

The Twelfth Amendment to the Constitution of Pakistan (Urdu: آئین پاکستان میں بارہویں ترمیم) was passed by the Parliament on 28 July 1991. The bill established Special Courts for the trial of heinous offenses. It also raised the salaries of the judges of the Supreme Court and the High Courts.

Amendments include addition of a new Article 212-B in the Constitution, and amendment of Fifth Schedule to the Constitution. The new article 212-B was inserted for a period of only three years and thus became ineffective in July 1994.

== Text ==
Addition of new Article 212-B in the Constitution: In the Constitution of the Islamic Republic of Pakistan, hereinafter referred to as the Constitution, in Part VII, in Chapter 4, after Article 212, the following new Article shall be added, namely:- 212-B, Establishment of Special Courts for trial heinous offenses.

- In order to ensure speedy trial of cases of persons accused of the heinous offenses specified by law as are referred to them by the Federal Government, or an authority or person authorized by it, in view of their being gruesome, brutal and sensational in character or shocking to public morality, the Federal Government may by law constitute as many Special Courts as it may consider necessary.
- Where the Federal Government constitutes more than one Special Court, it shall determine the territorial limits within which each one of them shall exercise jurisdiction.
- A Special Court shall consist of a Judge, being a person who is, or has been or is qualified for appointment as, a Judge of a High Court and is appointed by the Federal Government after consultation with the Chief Justice of the High Court.
- A person other than a Judge of a High Court who is appointed as a Judge of a Special Court shall hold office for the period this Article remains in force and shall not be removed from office except in the manner prescribed in Article 209 for the removal from office of a Judge, and, in the application of the said Article for the purposes of this clause, any reference in that Article to a Judge shall be construed as a reference to a Judge of a Special Court.
- The law referred to in clause (1) shall make provision for the constitution of as many Supreme Appellate Court as the Federal Government may consider necessary and an appeal against the sentence or final order of a Special Court being preferred to a Supreme Appellate Court which shall consist of (a) a Chairman, being a Judge of the Supreme Court to be nominated by the Federal Government after consultation with the Chief Justice of Pakistan, and(b)two Judges of the High Courts to be nominated by the Federal Government after consultation with the Chief Justice of the High Court concerned.
- Where the Federal Government constitutes more than one Supreme Appellate Court, it shall determine the territorial limits within which each one of them shall exercise Jurisdiction.
- A Special Court and a Supreme Appellate Court shall decide a case or, as the case may be, an appeal with thirty days.
- Notwithstanding anything contained in the Constitution, no Court shall exercise any jurisdiction whatsoever in relation to any proceedings before, or order or sentence passed by a Special Court or a Supreme Appellate Court constituted under a law referred to in clause (1), except as provided in such law.

Amendment of Fifth Schedule to the Constitution: In the Constitution, in the Fifth Schedule,--

- In the Part relating to the Supreme Court, -- (a) in the first paragraph, (i) for the figure "7,900" the figure "9,900", and for the figure "7,400" the figure "9,500", shall be substituted; and (ii) After the words "per mensem", at the end, the commas and words "or such higher salary as the President may, from time to time, determine" shall be added; and (b) for the third paragraph the following shall be substituted, namely: The pension payable to a retired Judge of the Supreme Court per mensem shall not be less or more than the amount specified in the table below, depending on the length of his service as Judge in that Court or a high Court Provided that the President may, from time to time, raise the minimum or maximum amount of pension so specified :- Chief Justice- Minimum amount Rs. 7,000 Maximum amount Rs. 8,000, Other Judge Minimum amount Rs. 6,250 Maximum amount Rs. 7,125
- In the Part relating to the High Court,-- (a) in the first paragraph,-- (i) for the figure "7,200" the figure "9,400" and for the figure "6,500" the figure "8,400", shall be substituted; and (ii) after the words "per mensem", at the end, the commas and words "or such higher salary as the President may, from time to time, determine" shall be added; and (b) for the third paragraph the following shall be substituted, namely:--"3. The pension payable per mensem to a Judge of a High Court who retires after having put in not less than five years service as such Judge shall not be less or more than the amount specified in the table below, depending on his service as Judge and total service, if any, in the service of Pakistan :Provided that the President may, from time to time, raise the minimum or maximum amount of pension so specified :-Chief Justice- Minimum amount Rs.5,640 Maximum amount Rs. 7,050, Other Judge Minimum amount Rs. 5,040 Maximum amount Rs. 6,300.

== See also ==
- Zia-ul-Haq's Islamization
- Separation of powers
- Imran Khan
- Nawaz Sharif
- Benazir Bhutto
- Pervez Musharraf
- Amendments to the Constitution of Pakistan
