= Sixteenth Amendment to the Constitution of Pakistan =

Affirmative action amendment

The Sixteenth Amendment to the Constitution of Pakistan (Urdu: آئین پاکستان میں سولہویں ترمیم) was passed by the National Assembly on July 27, 1999, by the Senate on June 3, 1998 and promulgated on August 5, 1998.

In order to encourage representation of minorities and people from disadvantaged areas in services of Pakistan, the Constitution of Pakistan in Article 27 has imposed a 10 year quota for services, which in 1985 was increased to 20 years, in the sixteenth amendment this limit was increased to 40 years.

== Text ==
In the Constitution of the Islamic Republic of Pakistan, in Article 27, in clause (1), in the first proviso for the word "twenty" the word "forty" shall be substituted and shall be deemed always to have been so substituted."

== See also ==
- Zia-ul-Haq's Islamization
- Separation of powers
- Nawaz Sharif
- Benazir Bhutto
- Pervez Musharraf
- Amendments to the Constitution of Pakistan
