= Eleventh Amendment to the Constitution of Pakistan =

Amendment to the Pakistani constitution

The Eleventh Amendment Bill to the Constitution of Pakistan (Urdu: آئین پاکستان میں گیارہویں ترمیم) was presented in the Senate on 31 August 1989. It was moved by Senators Muhammad Ali Khan, Dr. Noor Jehan Panezai and Syed Faseih Iqbal. The amendment sought to restore the seats for women in the National Assembly to 20. The bill was later withdrawn after the Government gave assurance that they intend to introduce the same bill themselves soon.

== Text ==
Amendment of Article 51 of the Constitution: In the Constitution of the Islamic Republic of Pakistan, in clause 4 of Article 51, for the word “third” occurring before the words “general election”, the word “fourth” shall be substituted.

== See also ==
- Zia-ul-Haq's Islamization
- Separation of powers
- Nawaz Sharif
- Benazir Bhutto
- Pervez Musharraf
- Amendments to the Constitution of Pakistan
