= Daronomics =

Pakistani economic policy

Daronomics is a term used in Pakistan to describe a set of economic policies pursued by Ishaq Dar, his predecessors, or successors to manage the economy of Pakistan.

These policies include maintaining a fixed dollar–rupee exchange rate, borrowing foreign currency loans to support the currency peg, keeping the State Bank of Pakistan's policy rate as low as possible, and controlling inflation through subsidies and cheap imports enabled by the fixed exchange rate.

== History ==
During Ishaq Dar's term from 1998 to 1999, his policies led to an economic crisis. After the nuclear tests, the government seized $11 billion held in local dollar accounts by Pakistani citizens and spent the dollars to cover the current account deficit. During this period, the currency was devalued by 25 percent in the open market compared to the official exchange rate. As a result, Pakistanis living abroad increasingly used hundi instead of official banking channels. Despite sovereign guarantees, the frozen dollar accounts were converted into rupees forcefully at the official conversion rate of Rs 46 to a US dollar. Pakistan was later forced to restructure its debt, which effectively resulted in a technical default on its loans.

From 2013 to 2017, Dar implemented pursued aimed at stabilizing the exchange rate by injecting dollars into the market. Critics argue that these measures worsened Pakistan's current account deficit, which rose from $4.4 billion to $16 billion, and this resulted in an International Monetary Fund bailout in 2019.
