= Third Amendment to the Constitution of Pakistan =

Amendment to the Pakistani constitution

The Third Amendment to the Constitution of Pakistan (Urdu: آئین پاکستان میں تیسری ترمیم) is an amendment to the Constitution of Pakistan that went into effect on 18 February 1975 during the government of Prime Minister Zulfikar Ali Bhutto. The amendment extended the period of preventive detention of those who were accused of committing serious cases of treason and espionage against the State of Pakistan, and were also under trial by the government of Pakistan. The amendment was aimed to provide protection against the abuse of government authority in legal procedure, and extended the investigation period from one month to three months.

== Text ==
In clause (4), for the words "one month" twice occurring the words "three months" shall be substituted. In clause (5) for the words and comma "as soon as may be, but not latter than one week", the words "within fifteen days" shall be substituted. In clause (7), in the proviso, after the word "enemy", the commas and words, or "who is acting or attempting to act in a manner prejudicial to the integrity, security of defense of Pakistan or any part thereof or who commits or attempt to commit any act which amounts to an anti-national activity as defined in a Federal Law or is a member of any association which has for its object, or which indulges him, any such anti-national activity" shall be added.
