= Twenty-sixth Amendment to the Constitution of Pakistan =

2024 amendment to the constitution of Pakistan

Constitution (Twenty-sixth Amendment) Act, 2024
- State emblem of Pakistan

Parliament of Pakistan
- Passed by: Senate of Pakistan
- Passed: In Senate of Pakistan: 20 October 2024
- Passed by: National Assembly of Pakistan
- Passed: In National Assembly of Pakistan: 21 October 2024 (Note: NA proceedings began in the later hours of the 20th and concluded in the opening hours of the 21st)
- Assented to by: President Asif Zardari
- Assented to: Assented granted on 21 October 2024

Legislative history

Initiating chamber: Senate of Pakistan
- Bill title: The Constitution (Twenty-sixth Amendment) Bill, 2024
- Introduced by: Azam Nazir Tarar (law minister)
- Committee responsible: Special Parliamentary Committee, NA
- Committee of the whole: 18 October 2024
- Status: In force

The Twenty-Sixth Amendment to the Constitution of Pakistan, the Constitution (Twenty-sixth Amendment) Act, 2024, is an amendment to the constitution of Pakistan passed by the parliament between 20–21 October 2024. The amendment contains 27 clauses, which effect change in judicial, parliamentary and executive frameworks: modifying aspects of judicial appointments, powers, and adjusting legal procedures. These include the removal of the controversial suo motu prerogative of the Supreme Court, the capping of the Chief Justice of Pakistan's tenure to three-years, the reconstitution of the Judicial Commission of Pakistan (JCP) to sit on judicial appointments, the formation of a separate constitutional bench in the Supreme Court, the limiting of the ability of courts to question the recommendations from cabinet to the president or the prime minister, the increasing of parliamentary oversight, and the establishment of a 12-member Special Committee in parliament with proportional representation to nominate the CJP (with two-thirds majority in the committee) from the three most-senior judges in the court.

The amendment introduces Article 9A, which declares "[e]very person shall be entitled to a clean, healthy and sustainable environment," as a fundamental right. The package also includes abolishment of riba (usury) "as far as practicable, by the 1st of January, 2028". It also the modified procedures for suo motu actions previously held by the Supreme and High courts are instead placed in the hands of a judicial committee under the Practice and Procedure Act. Under the amendment, the Chief Election Commissioner of Pakistan remains in office until the appointment of a replacement is notified. In Article 111, provincial advocate generals and counsel are permitted to partake in legal discussions in their respective provincial assemblies. The Special Parliamentary Committee responsible for the nomination of the Chief Justice is to hold its meetings in an in-camera sitting. The JCP is given the authority to "review" the performance of the Federal Shariat Court (FSC) and High Court judges, in addition to appointment prerogatives.

The constitutional package was presented by the Pakistan Muslim League (N) (PML-N) and attracted support from other parties; including the Pakistan People's Party, with its chairman Bilawal Bhutto Zardari, and the Pakistan Tehreek-e-Insaf, with its chief Gohar Ali Khan, who expressed their agreement with the draft, citing previous consensus with Jamiat Ulema-e-Islam (F) leader Maulana Fazlur Rehman. During parliamentary proceedings, the amendment was supported by Istehkam-e-Pakistan Party (IPP), Awami National Party (ANP), and Muttahida Qaumi Movement – Pakistan (MQM-P) parties, together with various independents and "others". During voting, members of PTI walked out, party leadership had previously declared the party's intent to boycott voting. On October 20, the amendment bill was approved by the Shehbaz Sharif government and passed through the Senate by 65 to 4 votes. During wee hours of 21 October, National Assembly of Pakistan passed the amendment by 225 to 12 votes.

Akhtar Mengal, leader of the Balochistan National Party (BNP) alleged that two of his party's senators had been abducted together with their families. Leaders from PTI and JUIF claimed the government was pursuing "coercive tactics" to pass the amendments, including the kidnapping of MNAs. Asad Qaiser claimed that party members were being offered Rs. 1-3 billion in bribes, while Omar Ayub Khan claimed "several PTI members and their family members were being intimidated and implicated in fabricated cases" to support the package. Attaullah Tarar claimed it was a "false narrative" and that "PTI had 'kidnapped its members itself'", holding them in KPK. PPP's Ali Musa Gilani and Agha Rafiullah "called for investigations" into the allegations. Prior to the parliamentary session, PTI "lost contact with 12 of its lawmakers", with party leaders concerned some would defect. The International Commission of Jurists (ICJ) stated the package was a "blow to judicial independence, the rule of law, and human rights protection". Members of the legal community interviewed by the Express Tribune and Dawn criticised it for an "assault on judicial independence" and the "biggest-reversal" of judicial independence in 3 decades.

Following the passage of the 26th Amendment, the Pakistan Stock Exchange (PSX)'s benchmark KSE-100 rose 711 points, Bloomberg stated the amendment was "seen as a major boost to the government faced with economic challenges and a barrage of protests." With Marva Khan stating it "essentially signifies a stronger coalition government going forward," with power over judicial appointments. Bilawal Bhutto claimed that prior the judiciary had "undermined democracy and strengthened military rulers."

== Timeline ==
On 18 October 2024, a proposed draft of the constitutional amendment was approved in the parliamentary special committee.

On 19 October it was reported that the draft had been finalised but was debated or voted upon by the National Assembly of Pakistan.

On 20 October 2024, the Cabinet approved the bill during a meeting chaired by Prime Minister Shehbaz Sharif.

Later in the day, the bill was introduced in the Senate of Pakistan by the Minister for Law and Justice Azam Nazeer Tarar. The senate then voted 65-4 to approve the bill, which had 22 clauses, with the required two-thirds majority.

On 21 October 2024, the bill that had 27 clauses after having incorporated the suggestions made by the Senate, was passed by the National Assembly of Pakistan by a two-thirds majority with the votes of 225 members.

The same day, the President Asif Ali Zardari gave his assent on the newly enacted law. Subsequently, the Act with 27 clauses was published in the Gazette of Pakistan.

== Articles of amendment ==
All articles of the Amendment Act passed unanimous in the Senate, with the exception of Clause 2, with four dissenting votes.

Amended/Inserted Clauses Indented

- Clause 2 (Insertion of Article 9A [clean and healthy environment])
  - Clause 2A (Amendment of Article 38 [Elimination of Riba before January 2028])
- Clause 3 (Amendment to Article 48 [president to act on advice])
- Clause 4 (Amendment to Article 81 [expenditure charged upon Federal Consolidated Fund])
- Clause 5 (Amendment to Article 111 [right to speak in Provincial Assembly])
  - Clause 6 (Amendment to Article 175A [Most senior judge of the Constitutional Bench])
- Clause 7 (Amendment to Article 177 [appointment of Supreme Court Judges])
- Clause 8 (Amendment to Article 179 [retiring age])
- Clause 9 (Amendment to Article 184 [Original Jurisdiction of Supreme Court])
- Clause 10 (Amendment to Article 185 [Appellate jurisdiction of Supreme Court])
- Clause 11 (Amendment to Article 186A [power of Supreme Court to transfer cases])
- Clause 12 (Amendment to Article 187 [issue and execution of processes of Supreme Court])
  - Clause 13 (Insertion of Article 191A [Constitutional Benches of the Supreme Court])
- Clause 14 (Amendment to Article 193 [Appointment of High Court Judges])
- Clause 15 (Amendment to Article 199 [Jurisdiction of High Court]) in favour: 65; against: 0
  - Clause 16 (Insertion of Article 202A [Constitutional Benches of High Courts])
  - Clause 16A (Amendment to Article 203C [The Federal Shariat Court])
  - Clause 16B (Amendment to Article 203D [Powers, jurisdiction and functions of the Court])
- Clause 17 (Amendment to Article 208 [Officers and servants of Courts])
- Clause 18 (Substitution of Article 209 [Supreme Judicial Council)
- Clause 19 (Amendment to Article 215 [Term of office of Commissioner])
  - Clause 19A (Amendment to Article 229 [Reference to Islamic Council])
  - Clause 19B (Amendment to Article 230 [Functions of the Islamic Council])
- Clause 20 (Amendment to Article 255 [Oath of Office])
- Clause 21 (Amendment to Article 259 [Awards])
- Clause 22 [Amendment to the Fourth Schedule of the Constitution]

== Criticism ==
The amendment was criticized by five interviewed lawyers/barristers in Dawn, calling it a "blow to the constitutional order", "politicising the judiciary", and "emasculating the judiciary". However, one of the lawyers acknowledged that the current draft was "more workable" compared to earlier versions, though concerns still remained which required "redressal". PTI alleged that seven of its lawmakers were "abducted" and claimed that the government was trying to pass the amendment "at gunpoint."

The amendment has also been criticised for "incongruities or jurisprudential conundrums" concerning the division of the Supreme Court's with the addition of the Constitutional Bench.

Imran Khan, in his September 2025 letter to Chief Justice of Pakistan Yahya Afridi, criticized the 26th Constitutional Amendment, alleging it was used to legitimize electoral irregularities following the 2024 Pakistani general election. He described the amendment as a tool to "sanctify electoral dacoity" and expressed concern that petitions challenging it remained unheard by the Supreme Court. Khan further claimed that a prior decision to bring these challenges before the full court was ignored and linked the amendment to what he called the compromised conduct of the Islamabad High Court under its current chief justice.

== See also ==
- Constitution of Pakistan
- Amendments to the Constitution of Pakistan
- Judicial Commission of Pakistan
- Judiciary of Pakistan
- Law of Pakistan
