= National debt of Pakistan =

Total unpaid borrowed funds carried by the Government of Pakistan

The national debt of Pakistan (Urdu: قومی قرضہ جاتِ پاکستان), or simply Pakistani debt, is the total public debt, or unpaid borrowed funds carried by the Government of Pakistan, which includes measurement as the face value of the currently outstanding treasury bills (T-bills) that have been issued by the federal government.

== History ==
In 2008 when Pakistan Peoples Party (PPP) had won the election, Pakistan's debt was Rs. 6,435 billion which increased by 135% in the next five years of PPP tenure, and became Rs. 15,096 billion in 2013. Majority of this increase in debt was in domestic debt in which external debt of Pakistan increased by 22 percent, from US$42.8 billion in 2008 to US$52.4 billion in 2013. PPP government was dependent on domestic and international lending to meet the needs of the government expenditures. Total debt increased to 64 percent of the GDP but external debt as a percentage of GDP decreased from 29.5 percent to 23.4 percent.

After 2013 Pakistani general election, Nawaz Sharif came to power. During their rule of five years, Pakistan's external debt increased from US$52.4 billion to US$75.3 billion, an increase of 144 percent, mainly due to the China-Pakistan Economic Corridor, for which loans were taken from China and all contracts awarded only to Chinese companies, the consequent high imports from China (not offset by any significant exports to China), and also Sukuk bonds.

After 2018 Pakistani general election, Imran Khan came to power. During his rule of 3 years still today Pakistani external debt increased from US$75.3 billion to US$110.6 billion an increase of 35.3 billion USD (214 percent).

According to a report by the International Monetary Fund, Pakistani owes China 30% of its $100 billion foreign debt. China has now become the biggest bilateral lender to Pakistan, surpassing all other creditors.

== Public debt ==
As of June 2023, Total Public Debt and Liabilities of Pakistan was estimated to be about Rs. 62.881 trillion/US$223.86 billion, which was 74.3 percent of the gross domestic product (GDP) of Pakistan. About Rs. 24.309 trillion (US$87.24 billion as of June 2024) was owed by the government to domestic creditors, and about Rs. 1.67 trillions/$6 billion owed by Public Sector Enterprises (PSEs).

Pakistan is facing a "huge external financing gap" of $4 billion, with China, Saudi Arabia, and the UAE expected to provide additional support. The IMF is seeking to fund its program and secure $7 billion for debt repayment, current account deficit financing, and increasing foreign exchange reserves. The talks between Pakistan and the IMF were delayed due to concerns over the credibility of the government's assurances and the reliability of foreign loans. Despite some agreement on reform actions and measures, there are still outstanding issues and the IMF has expressed concerns about the government's ability to fulfill past commitments.

(The now former) Foreign Minister Bilawal Bhutto Zardari of Pakistan asked the International Monetary Fund to soften the conditions of its bailout package to help the country protect flood victims from rising prices.

IMF urged Pakistan to hike its general sales tax rate to at least 18% in an effort to bolster revenue. The country's debt servicing costs are expected to surge to a high of Rs. 5.2 trillion in the current fiscal year. The IMF demand was made as the government shared its revised macroeconomic projections showing inflation rising to 29% and economic growth rate slowing to 1.5%, which will lead to higher unemployment and poverty in the country and debt-driven rising prices, food insecurity, and a growing debt burden add to Pakistan's other challenges and no doubt Inflation is running above 38 percent annually. As Pakistan's rupee experiences a significant depreciation and its foreign exchange reserves dwindle, the nation is facing challenges in importing crucial goods such as food, which has even resulted in tragic stampedes at distribution centers. This has raised concerns within Pakistan about the country's ability to meet its debt obligations.

Pakistan has one of the world's highest debt-to-GDP ratios and has procured a substantial sum of funds from international financial institutions to fulfill its financial requirements. This borrowing pressure has diminished the nation's foreign exchange reserves and resulted in the devaluation of its currency.

In June 2025, China rolled over $3.4 billion in commercial loans to Pakistan, providing a temporary relief to Islamabad’s critically low foreign reserves. According to a source from Pakistan's Finance Ministry (as reported by Reuters), the rollover includes a $2.1 billion deposit with the State Bank of Pakistan and the refinancing of a $1.3 billion commercial loan that had already been repaid.

While the move helped Pakistan meet the International Monetary Fund (IMF) requirement of maintaining over $14 billion in foreign reserves by June 30, 2025, it also highlights the country's growing dependence on external borrowing, particularly from China. The continued reliance on debt rollovers, rather than repayment, underscores Pakistan’s worsening debt sustainability and rising external debt-to-GDP ratio.

== External debt ==
As of December 2023, Pakistan's total external debt is $131.159 billion. Pakistan owes US$7.541 billion to Paris Club, US$38.813 billion to multilateral donors, US$7.596 billion to International Monetary Fund, and US$7.8 billion to international bonds such as Eurobonds, and Sukuks.

According to a report by AidData, Pakistan's total external debt owed to China amounted to $68.91 billion as of November 2023. The research identified 433 Chinese-funded projects in Pakistan from 2000 to 2021, making Pakistan the third-largest recipient of Chinese overseas funding in this period, after Russia and Venezuela. The report also states that between 2012 and 2021, Pakistan received emergency rescue loans from China each year to avert balance of payments crisis, and in 2020, China rescheduled at least one of these loans.

While the move helped Pakistan meet the International Monetary Fund (IMF) requirement of maintaining over $14 billion in foreign reserves by June 30, 2025, it also highlights the country's growing dependence on external borrowing, particularly from China. The continued reliance on debt rollovers, rather than repayment, underscores Pakistan’s worsening debt sustainability and rising external debt-to-GDP ratio.

Category	Amount (in million $USD)
A. Public external debt	99,700.4
1. Government external debt	80,165.4
a. Long term (>1 year)	80,066.1
i. Paris Club debt	7,541.1
ii. Multilateral debt (i.e. World Bank, Asian Development Bank, Islamic Development Bank)	38,813.6
iii. Other bilateral debt (i.e. China)	19,644.1
iv. Eurobonds and Sukuks	7,800.0
v. Commercial loans/credits (from Chinese banks)	5,611.3
vi. Local Currency Securities (Pakistan Investment Bonds (PIBs))	3.5
vii. NBP/BOC deposits/PBC	24.1
viii. Naya Pakistan Certificates	628.3
b. Short term (<1 year)	99.3
i. Multilateral*	99.3
2. IMF debt	7,596.3
a. Federal government	5,069.3
b. State Bank of Pakistan	2,527.0
3. Foreign exchange liabilities	11,938.6
a. Central bank deposits	3,700.0
b. Other liabilities (SWAP with People's Bank of China)	4,271.0
c. Allocation of SDR1	3,966.6
B. Public sector enterprises (PSEs)	7,869.1
1. Guaranteed debt	7,014.9
a. Other bilateral	6,532.5
b. Commercial loans	482.4
2. Non-guaranteed debt	854.2
a. Long term (>1 year)	48.6
b. Short term (<1 year)	305.6
c. non-guaranteed bonds	500.0
C. Banks	6,637.8
1. Borrowing	3,661.7
a. Long term (>1 year)	1,300.0
i. Private sector	1,300.0
b. Short term (<1 year)	2,361.7
i. Public sector	90.6
ii. Private sector	2,271.1
2. Nonresident deposits (LCY & FCY)	2,736.0
a. Public sector	101.2
b. Private sector	2,634.8
3. Other Liabilities	240.1
D. Private Sector	12,276.9
1. Non guaranteed debt	12,276.9
a. Loans	9,298.1
i. Long term (>1 year)	9,129.0
ii. Short term (<1 year)	169.2
b. Trade credits	2,343.0
c. Other debt liabilities	635.8
E. Debt liabilities to direct investors - Intercompany debt	4,674.9
Total external debt	131,159.1
Public external debt - excluding foreign exchange liabilities	87,758.2
Public external debt including PSEs	107,761.3
Source: State of Pakistan report dated December 2023
