= Sixth Amendment to the Constitution of Pakistan =

Amendment to the Pakistani constitution

The Sixth Amendment to the Constitution of Pakistan (Urdu: آئین پاکستان میں چھٹی ترمیم) was adopted by the elected Parliament of Pakistan on 22 December 1976, under the government of Prime minister Zulfikar Ali Bhutto. The VI Amendment stated that Chief Justice of Supreme Court will be retired at the age of 65 and a High Court honorable judge shall be retired at the age of 62.

== Text ==
Chief Justice of the Supreme Court who attains the age of sixty-five years before he has held that office for a term of five years may continue to hold that office until he has completed that term. Chief justice of the High Court who attains the age of sixty-two years before he has held that office for a term of five years may continue to hold that office until he has completed that term.
