= Twentieth Amendment to the Constitution of Pakistan =

Amendment regulating elections

The Twentieth Amendment Bill to the Constitution of Pakistan (Urdu: آئین پاکستان میں بیسویں ترمیم) was passed by the National Assembly of Pakistan on February 14, 2012. It was then moved to upper house, Senate where it was passed on February 20, 2012 and signed by the President on February 28, 2012.

== Amendments ==
The amendments were done in Article 48, Article 214, Article 215, Article 216, Article 218, Article 219, Article 224, Article 224A, and to the Second & Third Schedule to the Constitution of Pakistan. It has set down a process to install a caretaker set-up and hold free and fair elections and matters related to the office of Chief Election Commissioner and Member of Election Commission.

- The amendment reduced the number of committees at provinces for appointing caretaker chief ministers and their cabinets.
- It requires to constitute an eight-member committee each at the Center and the Provinces to nominate the prime minister and the chief ministers respectively and their cabinets.
- If the constituted committees failed to evolve consensus on a caretaker set-up within three days, the matter would be referred to the ECP for appointing the Caretaker Prime Minister and Chief Ministers.
- The Amendment now requires the Chief Justice of Pakistan to administer oath of the new Chief Election Commissioner (CEC), who will then administer the oath to newly appointed members of the Election Commission.
- The amendment requires following the same procedure for extension in the tenure of members of the ECP as specified for the Chief Election Commissioner. Similarly, the procedure to remove an ECP member would be same as the removal of the Chief Election Commissioner.
- Member of the ECP is now required to send his resignation to the President.
- Under the amendment the provision of not holding an office of profit will now also apply to the members of ECP like the Chief Election Commissioner.

== See also ==
- Zia-ul-Haq's Islamization
- Separation of powers
- Nawaz Sharif
- Benazir Bhutto
- Pervez Musharraf
- Amendments to the Constitution of Pakistan
