= Twenty-second Amendment to the Constitution of Pakistan =

Amendment to the Pakistani constitution

Constitution (Twenty-second Amendment) Act, 2016

Parliament of Pakistan
- Long title: An Act further to amend the Constitution of the Islamic Republic of Pakistan.
- Citation: Act No. XXV of 2016
- Territorial extent: Pakistan
- Passed by: National Assembly of Pakistan
- Passed: 19 May 2016
- Passed by: Senate of Pakistan
- Passed: 2 June 2016
- Assented to: 8 June 2016
- Commenced: 8 June 2016

Legislative history

First chamber: National Assembly of Pakistan
- Bill title: The Constitution (Twenty-second Amendment) Bill, 2016
- Bill citation: 22nd Amendment Bill
- Introduced by: Zahid Hamid
- Status: In force

The Twenty-second Amendment of the Constitution of Pakistan, officially known as the Constitution (Twenty-second Amendment) Act, 2016, sets to amend the procedure for the appointment, qualifications and other prerequisites for the chief election commissioner (CEC) and four members of the Election Commission of Pakistan (ECP).

== Proposal and enactment ==
The Constitution (Twenty-second Amendment) Bill, 2016 was introduced in the National Assembly of Pakistan by Zahid Hamid, then Minister for Law and Justice. The full text of the Statement of Objects and Reasons appended to the bill is given below:

This Constitutional Amendment Bill seeks to alter eligibility criteria for appointment of the Chief Election Commissioner and Members of the Election Commission of Pakistan and to provide for other related matters. At present only Judges of Supreme Court or High Court are eligible for appointment as Chief Election Commissioner or Members, respectively. After amendment, in addition to retired Judges of the Supreme Court or High Court, retired senior bureaucrats and technocrats will also be eligible for appointment as Chief Election Commissioner or a member. In order to give representation to all Provinces, out of four Members, one from each Province shall be appointed. Maximum age for appointment as Chief Election Commissioner (68 years) and a Member (65 years) is also being fixed.

Another important change relates to continuity of the Commission, whereby instead of all four members retiring together, two of the members shall retire every two and a half years. For the first term, the Commission will draw a lot as to which two members shall retire after the first two and a half years.

Other amendments provide that delimitation of constituencies and preparation of electoral rolls for elections to local governments shall also be the responsibility of the Election Commission of Pakistan.

The Bill is designed to achieve the aforesaid objects.

— Zahid Hamid, "The Constitution (Twenty-second Amendment) Bill, 2016" (PDF).

The Bill was considered and passed unanimously by the National Assembly of Pakistan on 19 May 2016, and the Senate of Pakistan on 2 June 2016. The bill received assent from the then President Mamnoon Hussain on 8 June 2016, and came into force on the same day. It was notified in The Gazette of Pakistan on 10 June 2016.
