= Tenth Amendment to the Constitution of Pakistan =

Amendment to the Pakistani constitution

The Tenth Amendment to the Constitution of Pakistan (Urdu: آئین پاکستان میں دسویں ترمیم) was enacted on March 29, 1987. It amended the articles 54 and 61 of the Constitution, by changing the duration of interval period between sessions of the National Assembly & Senate from 160 days to 130 days.

== Text ==
Amendment of Article 54 of the Constitution: In the Constitution of the Islamic Republic of Pakistan, hereinafter referred to as the Constitution, in Article 54, in clause (2), in the proviso, for the word "sixty” the word "thirty" shall be substituted. Amendment of Article 61 of the Constitution: In the Constitution, in Article 61, for the words "one hundred and sixty" the words "one hundred and thirty” shall be substituted.

== See also ==
- Zia-ul-Haq's Islamization
- Separation of powers
- Nawaz Sharif
- Benazir Bhutto
- Pervez Musharraf
