= Twenty-fourth Amendment to the Constitution of Pakistan =

Amendment to the Pakistani constitution

The Twenty-fourth Amendment to the Constitution of Pakistan, officially known as the Constitution (Twenty-fourth Amendment) Act, 2017, allows for the adjustment of seats in the Parliament of Pakistan in response to the provisional results of the 2017 Census. The overall number of seats in the National Assembly of Pakistan will remain the same, with Punjab losing seats, Balochistan and Khyber Pakhtunkhwa gaining seats, and Sindh retaining the same number of seats.
