= Seventh Amendment to the Constitution of Pakistan =

Amendment to the Pakistani constitution

The Seventh Amendment to the Constitution of Pakistan (Urdu: آئین پاکستان میں ساتویں ترمیم) was adopted by the elected Parliament of Pakistan on 16 May 1977, a month before the ending of the democratic government of Prime Minister Zulfikar Bhutto. The VII Amendment was also the last of seven amendments that were adopted the elected Parliament and enforced by the Government of Prime Minister Zulfikar Ali Bhutto. The VII Amendment orders and enables the people elected prime minister to obtain a vote of confidence by the people elected members of Parliament. The VII Amendment also constitutionally orders the people elected president to hold a national referendum for the approval of prime minister if he or she fails to secure the vote of confidence of the members of Parliament.

== Text ==
If at any time the Prime Minister considers it necessary to obtain a vote of confidence of the people of Pakistan through a referendum, he may advise the President to cause matter to be referred to a referendum in accordance with law made by Parliament. The President shall call upon the Referendum Commission to conduct a referendum amongst the persons whose names appear on the electoral rolls for the immediately preceding general elections to the National Assembly as revised up-to-date. Any dispute arising in connection with the counting of votes at referendum shall be finally determined by the Referendum Commission or a member thereof authorized by it and, save as aforesaid, no dispute arising in connection with a referendum or the result thereof shall be raised or permitted to be raised before any court or other authority whatsoever. If, on the final count of the votes cast at the referendum, the Prime Minister fails to secure majority of the total votes cast in the matter of the confidence of the people of Pakistan, he shall be deemed to have tendered his resignation.
