= Twenty-first Amendment to the Constitution of Pakistan =

Expired amendment on terrorism legal trial procedure

- Passed: January 6th, 2015
- Assented to: January 7th, 2015
- Status: Expired

Twenty-first Amendment to the Constitution of Pakistan (Urdu: آئین پاکستان میں اکیسویں ترمیم) was passed by both the National Assembly of Pakistan and Senate of Pakistan on January 6, 2015, and received the assent of the President on January 7, 2015. The Bill amended the Article 175 and the First Schedule of the Constitution. It also has a self-contained sunset clause, which causes the amendments to expire on January 7, 2017.

== Background ==
The amendment established speedy trial military courts for terrorist offenses, waging war against Pakistan, and acts threatening the security of Pakistan. The duration of these courts is two years. The decision to amend the constitution came after the 2014 Peshawar school massacre.

== Text ==
Short title and commencement:

- This Act may be called the Constitution (Twenty First Amendment) Act, 2015.
- It shall come into force at once.
- The provisions of this Amendment Act shall remain in force for a period of two years from the date of its commencement and shall cease to form part of the Constitution and shall stand repealed on the expiration of the said period.

Amendment of Article 175 of the Constitution: In the Constitution of the Islamic Republic of Pakistan, hereinafter called the Constitution, in Article 175, in clause (3), for the full stop at the end a colon shall be substituted and thereafter, the following proviso shall be inserted, namely:-

- Provided that the provisions of this Article shall have no application to the trial of persons under any of the Acts mentioned at serial No. 6, 7, 8 and 9 of sub-part III or Part I of the First Schedule, who claims, or is known, to belong to any terrorist group or organization using the name of religion or a sect.

Explanation:- In this proviso, the expression ‘sect’ means a sect of religion and does not include any religious or political party regulated under the Political Parties Order, 2002.

Amendment of First Schedule of the Constitution: In the Constitution, in the First Schedule, in sub-part III of Part I, after entry 5, the following new entries shall be added, namely:-

- The Pakistan Army Act, 1952 (XXXXIX of 1952).
- The Pakistan Air Force Act, 1953 (VI of 1953).
- The Pakistan Navy Ordinance, 1961 (XXXV of 1961).
- The Protection of Pakistan Act, 2014 (X of 2014).

== See also ==
- Constitution of Pakistan
- Amendments to the Constitution of Pakistan
