= Nineteenth Amendment to the Constitution of Pakistan =

Amendment to the Pakistani constitution

The Nineteenth Amendment to the Constitution of Pakistan (Urdu: آئین پاکستان میں انیسویں ترمیم) is a 2011 amendment reforming the judicial appointments procedure as well as expanding the Federally Administered Tribal Areas (FATA).

== Passage ==
The proposed amendment was presented in the National Assembly on 21 December 2010 by the Parliamentary Committee on Constitutional Reforms' Chairman Raza Rabbani.

The amendment was passed by the National Assembly on 22 December 2010, by the Senate on 30 December 2010, and assented to by the President on 1 January 2011.

== Amendments proposed ==
26 amendments to the present 6 articles constitution were proposed. The 19th Amendment has taken powers from the Chief Justice of Pakistan for the appointment of ad hoc judges and transferred them to the Judicial Commission of Pakistan (JCP). The President will now carry out the appointments on the recommendation of the JCP, under the new law 4 instead of 2 most senior judges will be appointed in the JCP.

The Tribal Areas, adjoining Laki Marwat and Tank districts, are declared to be part of FATA.

Name of the High court of Islamabad was changed to Islamabad High Court.

The 19th Amendment Bill also proposed an amendment in Article 175-A which binds the parliamentary committee to justify its decision in case it rejected any nominee of the Judicial Commission for the appointment of judges.

Prime Minister was included in the appointment procedure of judges. The parliamentary committee shall send the name of the nominee confirmed by it, to the Prime Minister who shall forward it to the President.

The 19th Amendment bill also proposed that committee meetings will be held in camera and a record of its proceedings shall be maintained.

The parliamentary committee, Not the Parliament will be allowed to discuss and consider the conduct of judges.

In the 19th Amendment bill, the constitutional reforms committee has also proposed amendments composition of judicial commission for the appointment of judges of the high court.
