= First Amendment to the Constitution of Pakistan =

Amendment to the Pakistani constitution

Constitution (First Amendment) Act, 1974
- Long title: An Act to amend the Constitution of the Islamic Republic of Pakistan
- Enacted: 4 May 1974
- Status: In force

The First Amendment to the Constitution of Pakistan (Urdu: آئین پاکستان میں پہلی ترمیم) is a part of the Constitution of Pakistan which came on effect on 4 May 1974. The official document of the First Amendment is called the Constitution (First Amendment) Act, 1974. The First Amendment redefined the international and provisional boundaries, federal treaties of Pakistan, and naval treaties of Pakistan. The amendment eliminates and removed the references of East-Pakistan after the recognition of Bangladesh. Articles 1, 8, 17, 61, 101, 193, 199, 200, 209, 212, 250, 260 and 272, and the First Schedule of the Constitution of Pakistan were amended.

== Text ==
The territories and boundaries of Pakistan shall comprise

- The Province of Baluchistan, the North-West Frontier, the Punjab and Sindh;
- The Islamabad Capital Territory, hereinafter referred to as the Federal Capital;
- The Federally Administered Tribal Areas; and
- Such States and territories as are or may be included in Pakistan, whether by accession or otherwise.
- Parliament may by law admit into the Federation new States or areas on such terms and conditions as it thinks fit.
