= Fourth Amendment to the Constitution of Pakistan =

Amendment to the Pakistani constitution

The Fourth Amendment to the Constitution of Pakistan (Urdu: آئین پاکستان میں چوتھی ترمیم) is an amendment that became part of the Constitution of Pakistan on 21 November 1975, under the Government of Prime minister Zulfikar Ali Bhutto. The IV Amendment decreed the seats for minorities and non-Muslims representation to the government of Pakistan and the Parliament of Pakistan, to protect the minority rights in the country. The IV Amendment also deprived courts of the power to grant bail to any accused or innocent [person] until proven guilty under any preventive detention. The IV Amendment protect the rights of Minorities in the country, and also protect the rights of accused [person] until proven guilty from the police brutality during the subsequent investigations.

== Text ==
IV Amendment, Article VIII of the Constitution:In clause (3), for paragraph (b) the following shall be substituted, namely laws specified in the First Schedule as in force immediately before the commencing day or as amended by any of the laws specified in that schedule; (ii) other laws specified in Part I of the "First Schedule"; (c)(sic) in clause (4), for the words and commas "the First Schedule, not being a law which relates to, or is connected with, economic reforms," the words and figure "Part II of the First Schedule" shall be substituted.

IV Amendment of Article XVII of the Constitution: In the Constitution, in Article 17, in clause (1), for the words "morality or public order" the words "sovereignty or integrity of Pakistan, public order or morality" shall be substituted.

IV Amendment of Article 199 of the Constitution. :A High Court shall not make an order until proven guilty; prohibiting the making of an order for the detention of a person, or for the grant of bail to a person detained, under any law providing for preventive detention.

VI Amendment of Article 51 (LI) of the Constitution:. (2-A) In addition to the number of seats referred to in clause (1), there shall be in the National Assembly six additional seats reserved for the persons, who are not exclusively Muslims. As soon as practicable after the general election to the National Assembly, the members to fill seats reserved in that Assembly for the persons referred to in clause (2-A) shall be elected in accordance with law by the members of the Assembly referred to in clause (1)".
