= Twenty-third Amendment to the Constitution of Pakistan =

Amendment to the Pakistani constitution

The Twenty-third Amendment to the Constitution of Pakistan, officially known as the Constitution (Twenty-third Amendment) Act, 2017, grants legal cover to military courts. The amendment was assented to by President Mamnoon Hussain in March 2017.
