= Fundamental rights in Pakistan =

The Fundamental rights in Pakistan are listed in the 1973 Constitution of Pakistan. These rights are termed "fundamental" because they are considered vital for comprehensive development, covering material, intellectual, moral, and spiritual aspects, and are protected by the fundamental law of the land, i.e., the constitution. In the event of a violation of these rights, particularly the Fundamental Rights, the Supreme Court and the High Courts have the authority to issue writs under relevant articles to enforce and safeguard these fundamental rights.

The Fundamental Rights in Pakistan are fundamental human freedoms that every Pakistani citizen is entitled to in order to ensure proper and harmonious development of their personality and life. These rights are applicable universally to all citizens of Pakistan, regardless of their race, place of birth, religion, caste, or gender. They are legally enforceable through the courts, albeit subject to certain restrictions as defined by the law and the constitution.

== Constitution of Pakistan 1973 ==
The 1973 Constitution of Pakistan ensures civil liberties, aiming to provide a peaceful and harmonious life for all its citizens. The Fundamental Rights in Pakistan encompass individual rights that are fundamental in many liberal democracies. These rights include essential principles such as equality before the law, freedom of speech and expression, freedom of association and peaceful assembly, and the freedom to practice religion. Violations of these rights may lead to punishments as outlined by the law, subject to the discretion of the judiciary.

In September 2020, Chief Justice of the Supreme Court Faez Isa, has underscored the distinctiveness of Pakistan's Constitution. He pointed out that it encompasses fundamental rights that are not frequently addressed in numerous other nations. He sees these rights as vital for the nation's well-being and progress.

== List of Fundamental Rights ==
The Constitution of Pakistan guarantees several fundamental rights to its citizens:

- Security of person: No individual shall be deprived of life or liberty except in accordance with the law.
- Safeguards as to arrest and detention: Any arrested person shall be informed promptly of the grounds for their arrest and shall have the right to consult and be defended by a legal practitioner of their choice.
- Right to fair trial: In any determination of civil rights, obligations, or criminal charges, a person shall be entitled to a fair trial and due process.
- Right against exploitation: No person shall be subjected to forced labor or services.
- Right to freedom of religion: Every citizen has the right to profess, practice, and propagate their religion.
- Cultural and Educational Rights: The State shall protect the legitimate rights and interests of minorities, ensuring their due representation in the Federal and Provincial services.
- Freedom of Media: Freedom of the press in Pakistan is legally protected by the law of Pakistan as stated in its constitutional amendments.
- Right to Information: The right to access information was added to the Constitution by the 18th Amendment.

These privileges are not absolute and can be changed through Constitutional modifications. They've been utilized to eliminate untouchability and prevent discrimination based on religion, race, caste, gender, or birthplace. Additionally, they prohibit human trafficking and forced labor. These rights also safeguard the cultural and educational interests of ethnic and religious minorities, enabling them to maintain their languages and manage their educational institutions.

=== Proposed inclusion ===
- Healthcare: The Human Rights Commission of Pakistan (HRCP) has advocated for integrating healthcare as a fundamental component, particularly in light of the COVID-19 pandemic in Pakistan revealing weaknesses within the health sector. This plea is amplified further by the recent United Nations warning about a nutrition crisis in Pakistan. HRCP emphasizes that healthcare should receive attention comparable to other fundamental rights outlined in the constitution.
- Privacy: Privacy stands as a fundamental right notably absent in the constitution of Pakistan. Surprisingly, advocates for both human and digital rights have not directed their focus towards addressing this issue. Article 14(1) does touch upon the inviolability of the dignity of individuals and, within legal bounds, the privacy of one's home. However, a comprehensive and explicit recognition of privacy as a fundamental right is lacking in the current constitutional framework.
- Air quality: The perilous air quality in Pakistan is viewed as a violation of fundamental rights. Despite rulings by the highest court in the country, affirming a clean environment as a fundamental right, Pakistan's densely populated cities consistently rank among the most polluted in the world. Cities like Karachi, Lahore, Peshawar, and Islamabad often display hazardous or unhealthy air quality levels on the air quality index. This dire situation affects a significant population of over 32 million people who are forced to breathe toxic air. The article proposes that factors such as a burgeoning population, increasing number of vehicles, inadequate green spaces, and insufficient awareness about the importance of a clean environment are significant contributors to this problem.
- Right to Food: This is considered a fundamental right and has been upheld by the judiciary. The Lahore High Court, in a precedent-setting ruling, stated that food wastage infringes upon this right. The court instructed the Punjab government to implement measures to ensure surplus food is distributed to those in need. This ruling is unique in its assertion that the right to food encompasses an obligation to prevent the wastage of safe and edible surplus food.
