= Sir Suba Shah =

Pakistani village

- Town
- Location within Punjab, Pakistan Location within Pakistan
- Coordinates: 33°23′39″N 73°30′36″E
- Country: Pakistan
- Region: Punjab
- District: Rawalpindi District
- Tehsil: Kallar Syedan
- UC: Manyanda
- Time zone: UTC+5 (PST)
- Area code: 051

Sir Suba Shah is a town in Manyanda Union Council of Kallar Syedan Tehsil in Rawalpindi District Punjab, Pakistan.

== Geography ==
Kallar Syeda, the capital city is a main shopping center for the people.

The countryside surrounding the town is typical of the Potohar Plateau landscape. It is surrounded by several smaller towns along with the main towns: Choha Khalsa, Doberan Kallan, Kanoha and Samote. The fertile land of the Union Council Manyanda region grows crops such as wheat, corn and peanuts.

== Language ==
- Pothwari language: 90%
- Urdu: 5%
- Pashto: 3%
- Other: 2%

== Schools ==
- Government Boys High School Sir Suba Shah, Manianda, Kallar Syedan
