= Takal =

- Village
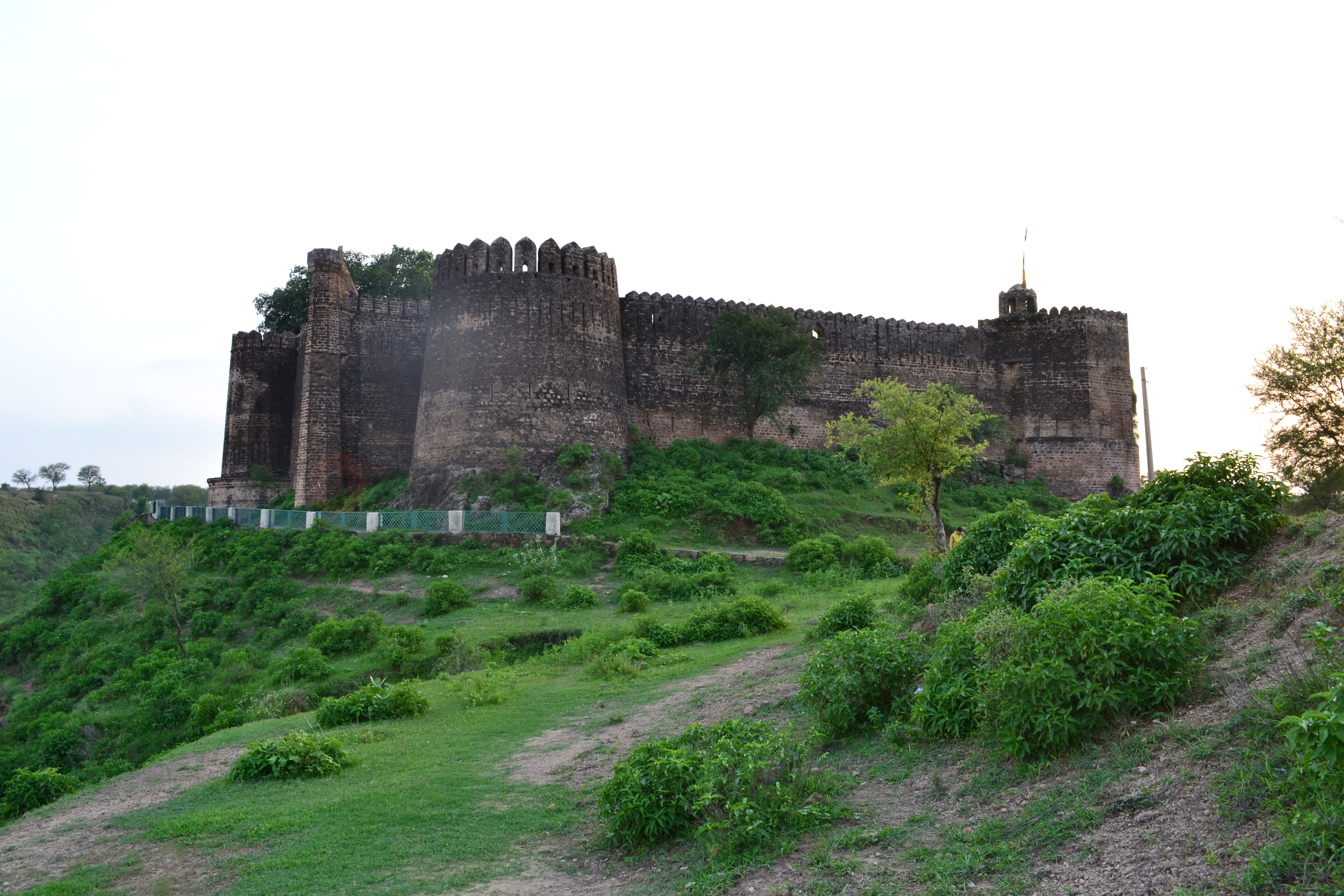
- Nearby Sangni Fort, west of Takal

- Location within Punjab, Pakistan Location within Pakistan
- Coordinates: 33°22′26″N 73°28′05″E
- Country: Pakistan
- Province: Punjab (Pakistan)
- District: Rawalpindi
- Tehsil: Kallar Syedan
- UC: Choha Khalsa
- Time zone: UTC+5 (PST)

Takal is the biggest village in the Choha Khalsa Union Council of Kallar Syedan Tehsil, Rawalpindi District of Punjab, Pakistan. Nearby towns include Bewal and Choha Khalsa. The village named after a Sikh, Tikka Lal Singh. It is located about 15 kilometres (9.3 mi) from Kallar Syedan, towards the Jhelum River.

== Places of interest ==
- Sangni Fort

== Schools in Takal ==
- Government Boys Middle School TAKKAL, CHOA KHALSA, KALLAR SYEDAN
