= Mohra Rajgan =

Coordinates: 32°45′N 73°05′E

Mohra Rajgan is a village in Bhalakhar, Kallar Syedan tehsil, Rawalpindi District, Pakistan. The population of Mohra Rajgan peoples belong to Gakhar tribe.
