= Guff, Kallar Syedan =

Guff
- Union Council and Village
- Location within Punjab, Pakistan Location within Pakistan
- Coordinates: 33°28′35″N 73°22′44″E
- Country: Pakistan
- Region: Punjab
- District: Rawalpindi District
- Tehsil: Kallar Syedan
- Capital: Guff
- Time zone: UTC+5 (PST)
- Area code: 051

Guff is a village and a union council of Kallar Syedan Tehsil in Rawalpindi District Punjab, Pakistan. Guff Coms under Kallar Syedan Circle Union Councils Guff was under NA-50, National Assembly and PP-2, Punjab Assembly. After (Delimitation 2018) Guff came under NA-58, National Assembly and PP-7, Punjab Assembly.

== Language ==
- Pothwari language: 90%
- Urdu 5%
- Pashto 3%
- Other 2%

== Schools in Guff ==
- Government Girls Primary School GUFF SINGAL, GUFF, KALLAR SYEDAN
