= Sairi Saroha =

Pakistani village

- Coordinates: 33°26′24″N 73°23′46″E

Sairi Saroha is a small village near Kallar Syedan in Punjab, Pakistan just three kilometres from the town. The village has a population of approximately 500 residents, living in around 80 houses. Nearby villages include Loni (Looni Salyal), Paikan, and Bimma Gangal.
