= Mohra Bakhtan =

Mohra Bakhtan موہڑہ بختاں
- Village
- Location in Rawalpindi, Pakistan
- Coordinates: 33°30′11″N 73°17′02″E
- Country: Pakistan
- Province: Punjab
- District: Rawalpindi
- Founder: Bakhtan Bibi

Government
  - Type: Democratic

Languages
  - Official: Pothohari, Urdu
- Time zone: UTC+05:00 (PKT)
- Postal code: 47541
- Vehicle registration: RWP-

Mohra Bakhtan is a village located in Tehsil Kallar Syedan. Formally, it was a part of Tehsil Kahuta and was later added to Tehsil Kallar Syedan after its creation. The District for Mohra Bakhtan is Rawalpindi, Pakistan, and Union Council is Ghazan Abad. It is considered one of the biggest villages in the tehsil by the ratio of both land and population. The current councilor for the village is Dhok Mirzayan. Construction by corporations on the lower end of Mohra Bakhtan has affected its environment.

== Neighborhood ==
The nearest village to Mohra Bakhtan is Tirkhi, Chamba Karpal, and Tarell. Pir Garata is the closest route to reach the main stop of Shah bagh. Main road which connects it to Shah bagh is through Pari stop and Nathya Stop. It is directly connected to DHA Valley.

== Casts and Sectarianism ==
Most of the population is Sunni Muslim but there are others too. Followers of Dawat-e-Islami can be found in huge numbers. Events celebrated round the year include Eid-ul-Adha, Eid-ul-Fitr, Eid-Milad-Nabi, Muharram and Pandaara's (local festivity).

== Landmarks ==
=== Jamia Masjid Bilal ===
This masjid is situated in Mohra Dhok. It is among oldest masjids of area.

=== Eid-Gah Wali Masjid ===
This is situated in upper Dhok. It has a proper Eid-Gah attached to it and is also used for funeral prayers and religious functions.

=== Sultani Masjid ===
This masjid is situated near Dhok Baseera.

== Gallery ==
Mohra Bakhtan In pictures

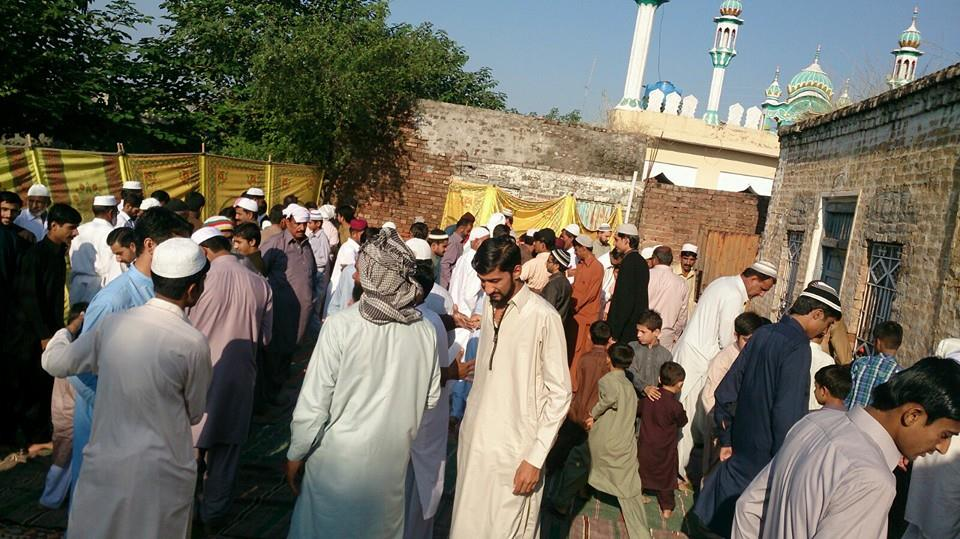
People greeting after eid prayer mohra Bakhtan

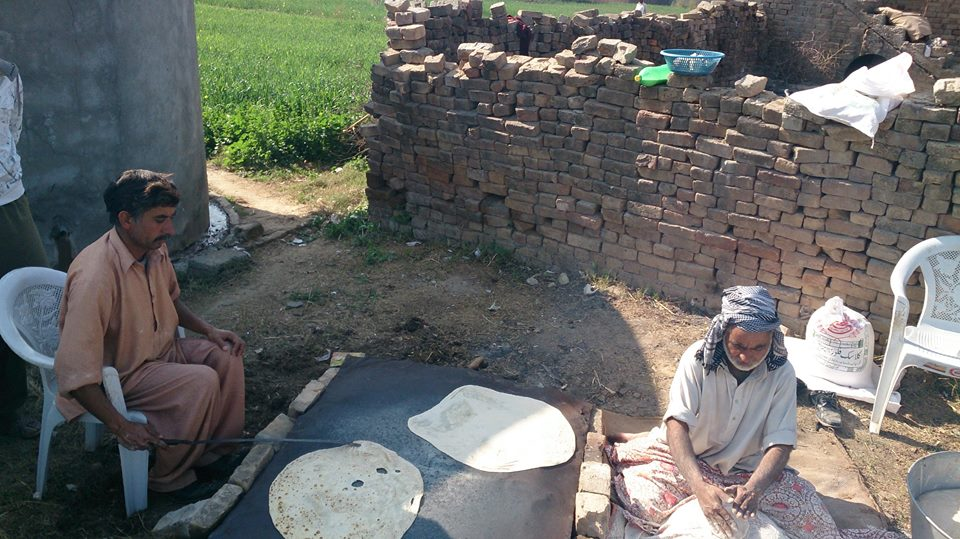
Cooking food for Gathering of people Mohra Bakhtan

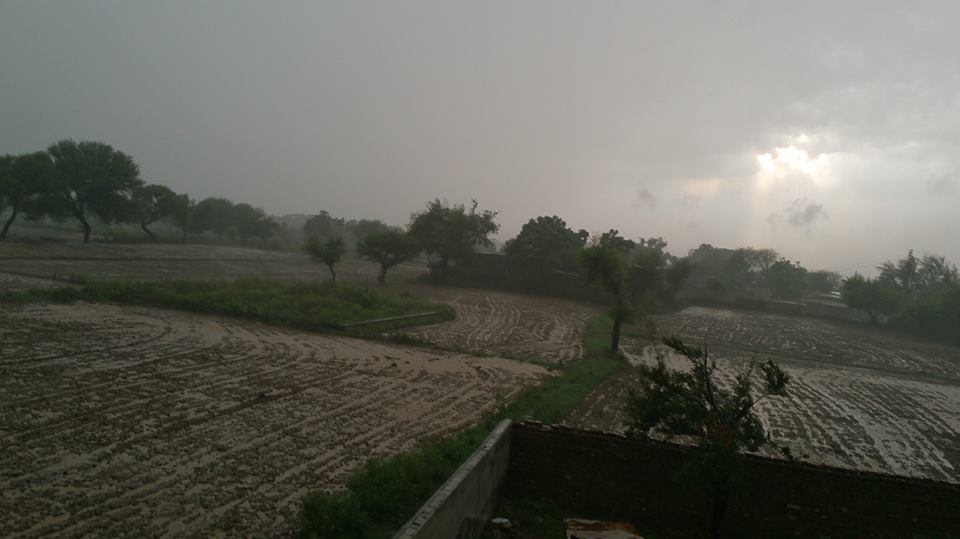
A field after rain Mohra Bakhtan

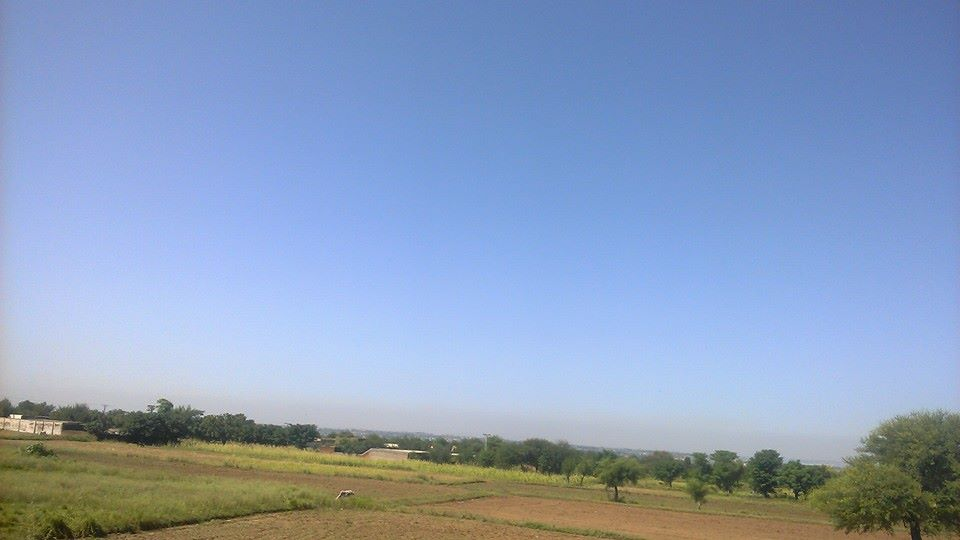
A view of Mohra Bakhtan

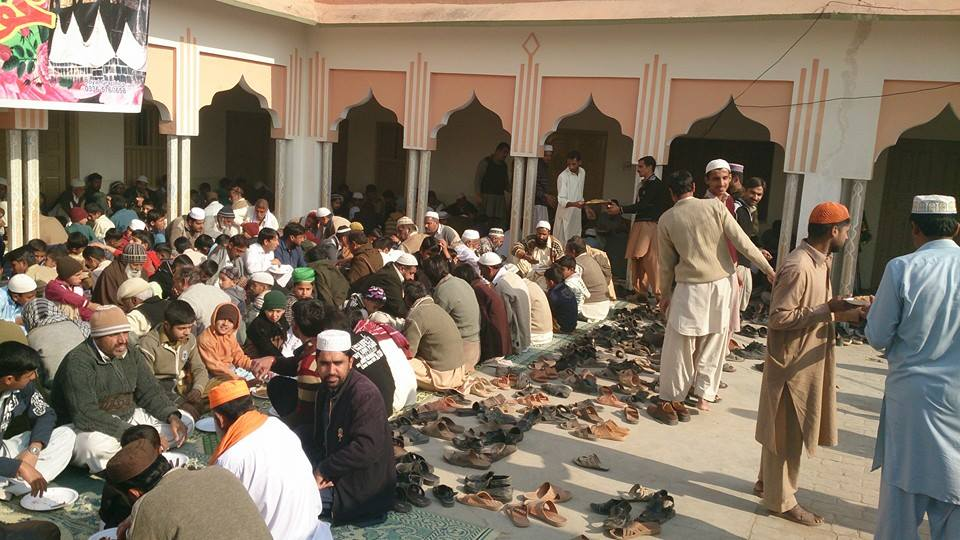
Gathering for religious function Mohra Bakhtan

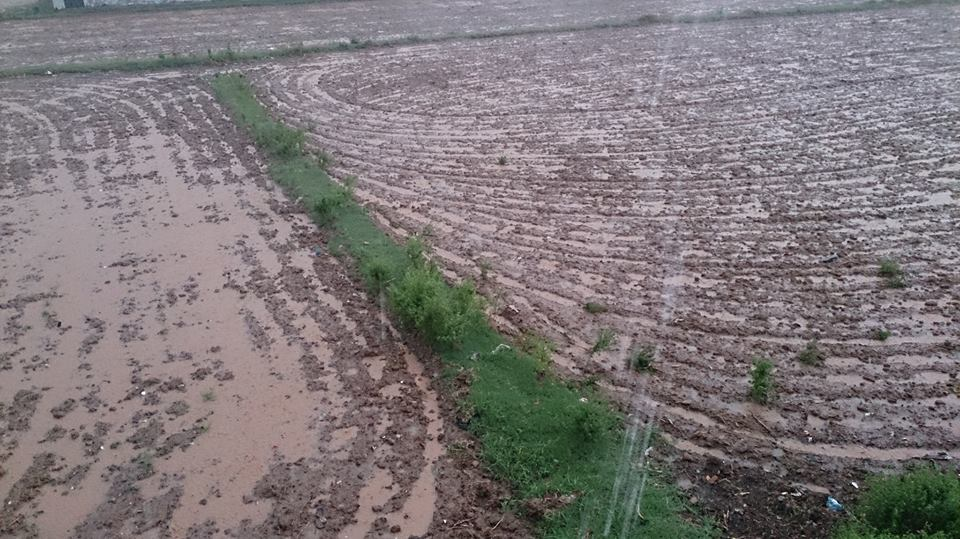
A field after rain Mohra Bakhtan

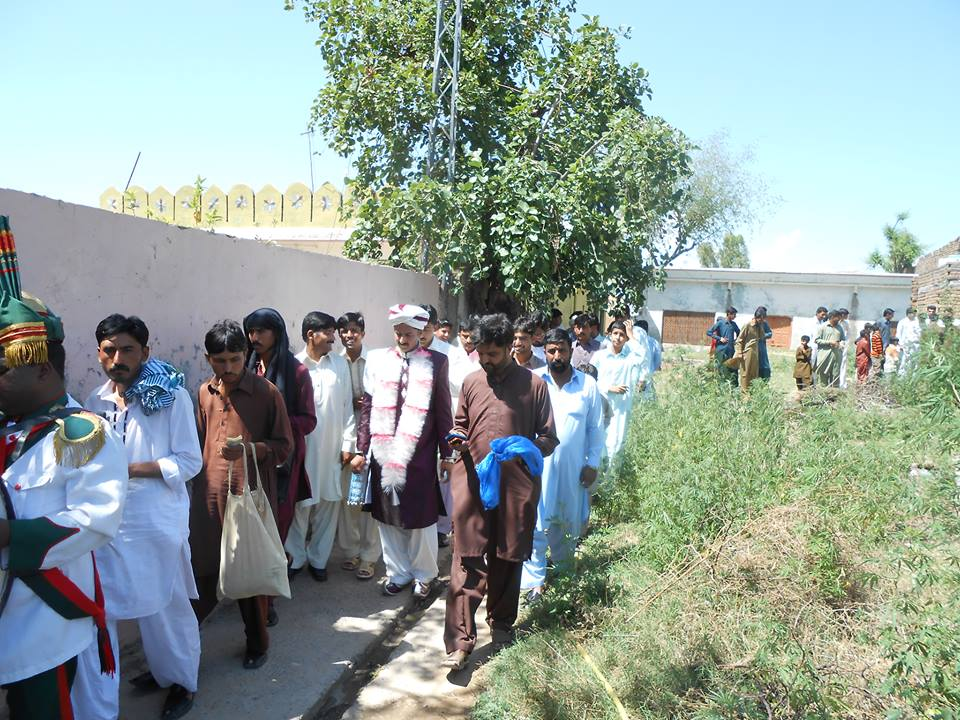
A wedding function Mohra Bakhtan

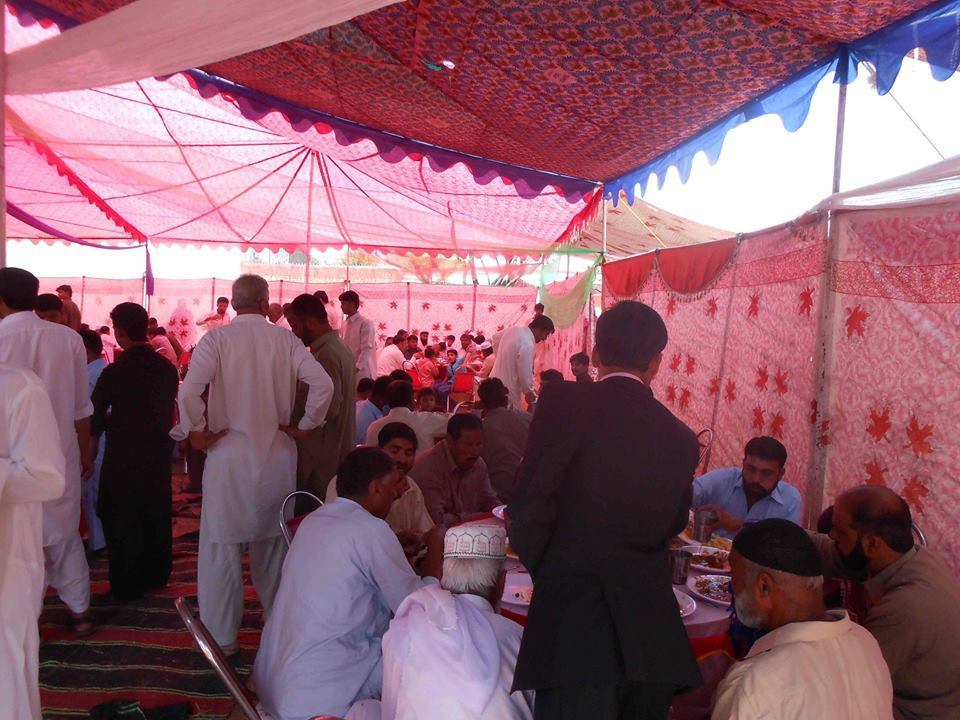
A wedding feast (Walima) Mohra Bakhtan
