= PP-9 Rawalpindi-III =

Constituency of the Provincial Assembly of Punjab, Pakistan

- Constituency for the Provincial Assembly of Punjab
- Region: Rawalpindi Tehsil (partly) and Gujar Khan Tehsil (partly) including Daultala town of Rawalpindi District

Current constituency
- Created from: PP-4 Rawalpindi-IV

PP-9 Rawalpindi-III (پی پی-9، راولپنڈى-3) is a Constituency of Punjab Assembly.

== Area ==
- Gujjar Khan Tehsil excluding Municipal Committee Gujjar Khan and Qazian Circle Union Councils
- Arazi Khas and UC Bishandote of Kallar Syedan Tehsil, of Rawalpindi District.

== 2008—2013: PP-4 (Rawalpindi-IV) ==
Provincial election 2008: PP-4 Rawalpindi-IV
Party	Candidate	Votes	%	±%
PML(Q)	Shaukat Aziz Bhatti	38,437	36.30	
PPP	Brig (R) Muhammad Hassan	34,718	32.79	
PML(N)	Raja Muhammad Hameed	32,648	30.83	
Independent	Yehya Faiz (R)	88	0.08	
Turnout		107,951	56.72	
Total valid votes		105,891	98.09	
Rejected ballots		2,060	1.91	
Majority		3,719	3.51	
Registered electors		190,314		

== 2013—2018: PP-4 (Rawalpindi-IV) ==
General elections were held on 11 May 2013. Raja Shaukat Aziz Bhatti won this seat with 60,159 votes.

Provincial election 2013: PP-4 Rawalpindi-IV
Party	Candidate	Votes	%	±%
PML(N)	Raja Shaukat Aziz Bhatti	60,159	47.06	
PTI	Ch. Sajid Mehmood	36,886	28.86	
PPP	Brig (R) Muhammad Hasan	23,440	18.34	
Independent	Majeed Akhtar Hussain	3,081	2.41	
Others	Others (twelve candidates)	4,257	3.33	
Turnout		131,434	61.81	
Total valid votes		127,823	97.25	
Rejected ballots		3,611	2.75	
Majority		23,273	18.20	
Registered electors		212,632		

== 2018—2023: PP-9 (Rawalpindi-IV) ==
General elections are scheduled to be held on 25 July 2018. In 2018 Pakistani general election, Chaudhary Sajid Mehmood a candidate of Pakistan Tehreek-e-Insaf won PP-9 Rawalpindi IV election by taking 51,686 votes.

Provincial election 2018: PP-9 Rawalpindi-IV
Party	Candidate	Votes	%	±%
PTI	Chaudhary Sajid Mehmood	51,686	34.82	
PPP	Chaudhary Sarfaraz Ahmad Khan	29,319	19.75	
PML(N)	Raja Muhammad Hamid	27,530	18.55	
Independent	Raja Faisal Aziz Bhatti	22,820	15.37	
TLP	Syed Dewan Ali Shah Bukhari	11,854	7.99	
MMA	Chaudhary Abid Hussain	2,159	1.46	
Independent	Malik Muhammad Masood	1,066	0.72	
Others	Others (four candidates)	2,004	1.35	
Turnout		154,192	58.08	
Total valid votes		148,438	96.27	
Rejected ballots		5,754	3.73	
Majority		22,367	15.07	
Registered electors		265,492		

== General elections 2024 ==
Provincial election 2024: PP-9 Rawalpindi-III
Party	Candidate	Votes	%	±%
PML(N)	Shaukat Raja	50,719	28.91	
PPP	Ch.Sarfaraz Ahmed Khan	43,644	24.88	
Independent	Munir Ahmed	35,881	20.45	
TLP	Raja Babar Hussain	22,533	12.84	
Independent	Ch. Sajid Mehmood	9,942	5.67	
Independent	Muhammad Naveed Bhatti	4,800	2.74	
JI	Habib Nawaz	3,781	2.16	
Others	Others (eleven candidates)	4,151	2.35	
Turnout		180,569	55.19	
Total valid votes		175,451	97.17	
Rejected ballots		5,118	2.83	
Majority		7,075	4.03	
Registered electors		327,174		
hold				

== See also ==
- PP-8 Rawalpindi-II
- PP-10 Rawalpindi-IV
