= Manakray =

Village in pakistan

Manakray (Urdu/Punjabi: منکرائے) is a village in Gujar Khan Tehsil. Manakray is approximately 54.2 km via GT Rd/N-5/AH2 from Rawalpindi and 48.5 km via Kallar Syedan Road from Rawalpindi
