= Hadwala Gujaran =

- Location within Pakistan
- Coordinates: 33.44°N 73.29°E
- Country: Pakistan
- Province: Islamabad Capital Territory
- Elevation: 520 m (1,710 ft)

Population
  - Total: 1,100
- Time zone: UTC+5 (PST)

Hadwala Gujaran is a village in the Islamabad Capital Territory of Pakistan. It is located at 33° 26' 35N 73° 17' 45E with an altitude of 520 metres (1,710 ft).

== Etymology ==
Hadwala is composed of two words from Pothwari/Punjabi language; had means "half" and wala means "owner", so Hadwala means "owner of half". This name was given because the head of this village who belonged to Gujjar tribe owned half the lands of the area around this village in Union Council Bishandot.

The major population of the village consists of Gujar tribe.

Although the village is located in a remote area about 5 kilometres (3.1 mi) away from the main road and it provides a difficult (albeit improved in recent years) situation in which to live, the quality of education the people have is remarkable. The road has been established since 2013.

== Politics ==
Hadwala Gujaran is situated in provincial constituency of Punjab (PP7) and NA 52 is the constituency for national assembly. Muslim League(N) currently has a strong hold on these constituencies before last general elections in 2018. Pakistan Tehrik Insaf (PTI) won both provincial and national assembly seats during the election of 2018. PTI is very famous in young generation of the area. Hadwala Gujaran is situated in District Rawalpindi, tehsil Kallar Syedan and Union council Bishandot.

== Surroundings ==
Chowk Pindori, Sagri, and Kallar Syedan are the nearest towns. Rawat is also nearby town to reach GT road. Mankiala Joor Road is also an easy joining point for travel towards Gujar Khan. Bhatta, Aziz Pur Gujaran, Mohra Najar, Arazi Khas, Roopar, and Bishandot are nearby villages.

== Map and location ==
https://www.google.co.uk/maps/place/Hadwala+Gujaran,+Pakistan/@33.4430333,73.2965273,392m/data=!3m1!1e3!4m2!3m1!1s0x38dff9f2452283b7:0x68041c0e0193cead

- http://mapcarta.com/14559540
- Article title
