= Chaudhary Muhammad Khalid =

Pakistani politician

Chaudhary Muhammad Khalid MPA

Member of the Provincial Assembly of the Punjab
- In office March 12, 1985 – November 17, 1996
- Constituency: PP-12 (Rawalpindi-VII)

Personal details
- Born: Kallar Saidan, Rawalpindi
- Party: Pakistan Peoples Party

Chaudhary Muhammad Khalid (Urdu: چودھری محمد خالد) was a politician who served as a Member of the Provincial Assembly of the Punjab thrice between 1985 and 1996. Affiliated with the Pakistan Peoples Party, he was elected as a representative from the PP-7 (Rawalpindi-II) constituency to serve the Kallar Syedan and Kahuta tehsils.
