= Mohra Heran =

- Village
- Location within Pakistan
- Coordinates: 33.25°N 73.30°E
- Country: Pakistan
- Province: (Punjab, Pakistan) Punjab
- Elevation: 489 m (1,604 ft)
- Time zone: UTC+5 (PST)

Village Mohra Heran is part of union council Choha Khalsa, and is two miles from Choha Khalsa. It is a valley in foot steps of the mountains.

People originated from Mohra Nagrial in 1870 to here. Numberdar Badar-ud-Din of Mohra Nagrial discovered this valley, by profession he was a farmer and this place was much suitable for his cattle, because of the greenery, so he built a cottage and settled down in this valley. After sometime rest of his family joined him in the new village, and it became a small village at the end of 1899.

== Name ==
According to Subaidar Raja Abdul Latif Mohra Heran was named after Heer Rivulet.

== Population ==
Current population of the village is around one thousand people and has 227 houses.

== Education ==
Majority of the people are well educated. Almost in every family there are two to three teachers. Girls education percentage is higher than boys, around 60 to 70% girls are doing intermediate graduation, while 50% of the boys are in higher studies.

== Sports ==
Mohra Heran is also known for sports activities. Mainly played games in Mohra Heran are cricket, football, volleyball and kabadi (cultural game). Right Club is well known cricket club of Mohra Heran.

== Culture ==
Hunting (dove, rabbit, partridge) and breeding of different birds (pigeon) and animals is included in the culture of Mohra Heran. People also keep black partridge and Bataira (called in local language) as a hobby.

=== Cultural Games ===
==== Bulls Race ====
Bull race is a common cultural game of Pothwar region. It was practiced by our forefathers (nominated among them are Master Barkat Gee, Master Ahmed Gee, and Malik Sawar) as well but now at current Nambardar Shakeel, is famous in this game.

==== Kabadi ====
Chaudhary Saleem (Late) was famous in this game in whole district Kallar Sayedan.

==== Dog Race ====
At current two people Master Khalid Mehmood and Master Javed are famous in the field of dog racing and rabbit hunt.
