= Mankera =

Mankera منکیرہ
- City
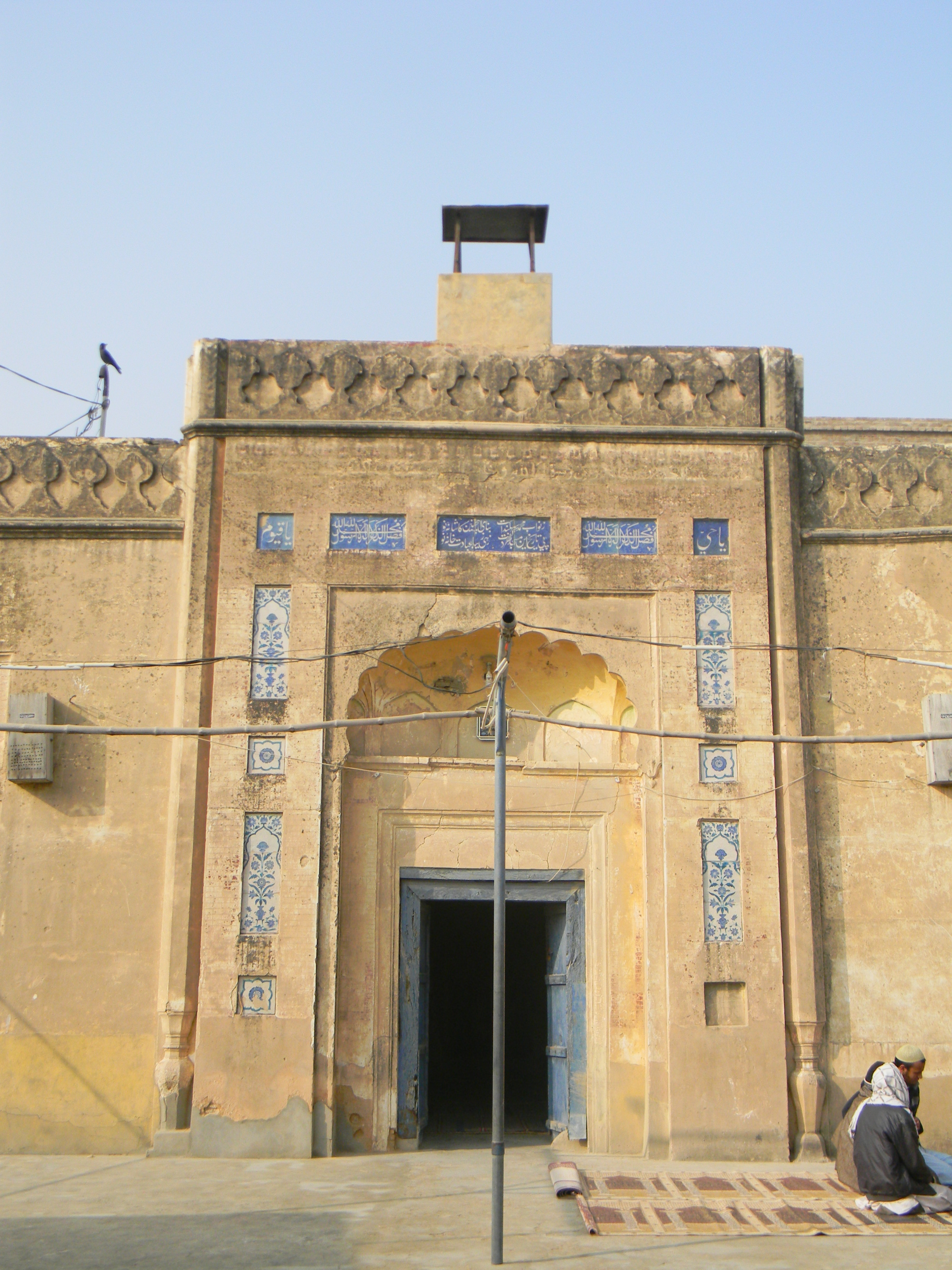
- A mosque in Mankera

- Location in Pakistan Mankera (Pakistan)
- Coordinates: 31°23′N 71°26′E
- Country: Pakistan
- Province: (Punjab, Pakistan) Punjab
- Division: Sargodha
- District: Bhakkar

Population (2017)
  - City: 14,184
- Time zone: UTC+5 (PST)
  - Summer (DST): +6
- Area code: +92453

Mankera (Saraiki and Urdu: منكيره) is the principal town of Mankera Tehsil, an administrative subdivision of Bhakkar District, in the Punjab province of Pakistan. It is situated about 320 km (200 mi) west of Lahore, capital city of the Punjab province.

Bhakkar is located in the west of Punjab. The mighty Indus River flows on the western side of the district and the Jhelum and Chenab rivers both flow on the eastern side, all of which can be destructive during the monsoon season. One-third of the land is sandy, of which a small portion is irrigated by Thal canal and tubewells. The rest of the sandy land is cultivated and is entirely dependent upon rains. The local population mainly depends on agriculture, which is highly dependent on rain; as such people are poor. Education and health facilities are not adequately available.

== History ==
Map of Ancient State Mankera.

The first Muslim governor of Mankera was Ahmed bin Khuzema who died there and is buried in Mankera Fortress.

Following the decline of Arab rule in Sindh, the Ghaznavid king Mahmud of Ghazni took possession of Mankera. The Abdali kings annexed Mankera and the adjoining areas and the Baloch gave way to Saddozai Pathans. The Pathan rule of the state ended with the famous siege of Mankera by Ranjit Singh which resulted in the forfeiture of Nawab Surbuland's claim to Mankera and his retreat to Dera Ismail Khan.

=== Mankera Fortress ===
Mankera Fortress, the principal feature of the town, lies 0.5 kilometres (0.31 mi) to the left of the Bhakkar highway. The fort was constructed in two phases. The initial construction of the brick fort was carried out during the Baloch rule, and further fortification in the form of a thick mud wall was undertaken during the Pashtun rule. The fort and its fortification are mostly in ruins. The major part of the mud wall still exists, with decay and neglect visible. The main fort is mostly in ruins except for a well, a tomb, and a few signs of masonry. The outer walls of the citadel are intact. Mankera was the seat of their dominions. The tomb of Mankera is not in good condition.

=== Sikh rule (1821-1846) ===
Next to the congregational mosque (jamia masjid) of Mankera are the ruins of a temple built during the Sikh rule, and the tomb of Nawab Sarbaland Khan is just outside the main citadel.

The Sikh annexation of this area began in 1821, and was completed with the fall of Mankera in the autumn of that year. Misr Diwan Chand besieged Mankera for twenty-two days before the Nawab surrendered the fort to the Sikhs. After the surrender, the area was put under the direct control of the Lahore empire. The Sikh rule of Mankera ended in 1847.

=== Other events ===
After Humayun Shah, son of Taimur Shah, failed in an attempt to overthrow his brother, Zaman Shah, who then had the former blinded, Humayun spent the rest of his life imprisoned in Mankera Fortress.

== Mankera today ==
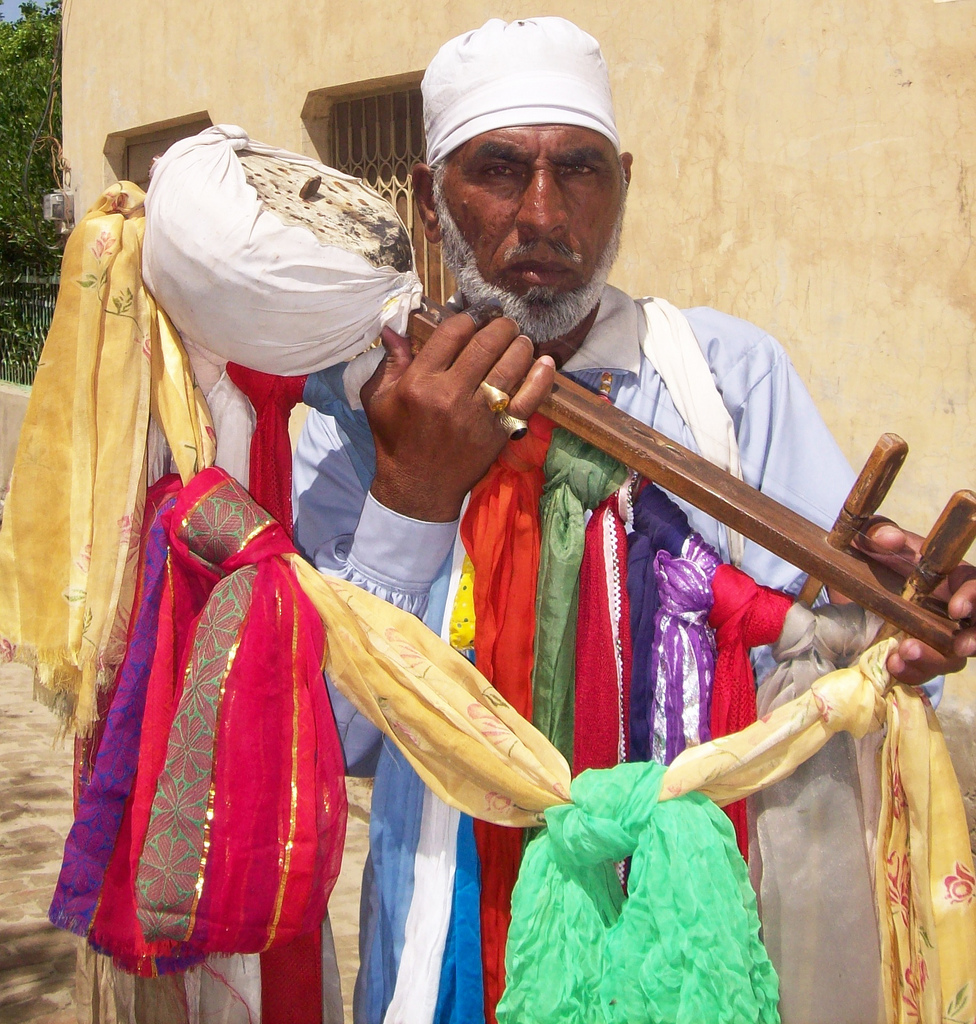

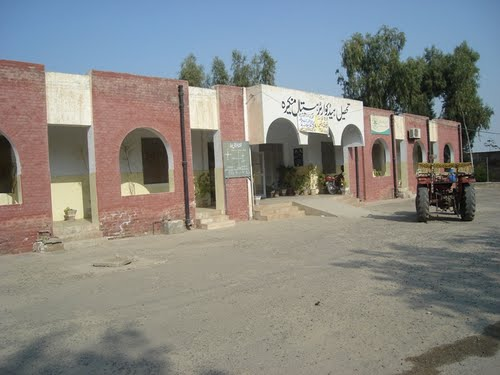
THQ Hospital Mankera

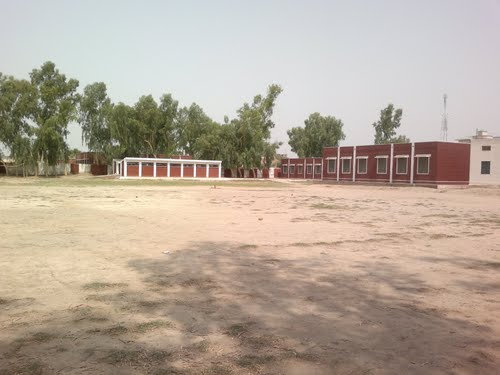
GHS Mankera

Mankera is a subdivision (tehsil) currently under the supervision of the district government. Mankera's main bazaar has neat rows of shops on either side. The town has seven government schools − one high school and one elementary school for boys and one high school and four primary schools for girls. The first primary school has been in existence for over a hundred years. There are also many private schools in the town, a special school for disabled children, a degree college, a commerce college, and a forty-bed hospital. The jamia masjid has been demolished and reconstructed. Tehsil Municipal Administration's sewerage and sanitation system is very poor.

Mankera is the second biggest tehsil after Shergarh.

== Transport ==
The nearest airport to Mankera, Dera Ismail Khan, is now out of use. There is a bus service available.

Mankera is 360 km (220 mi) from Lahore and located on the main Lahore-Dera Ismail Khan road.
