= Misr Diwan Chand =

General of the Sikh Empire

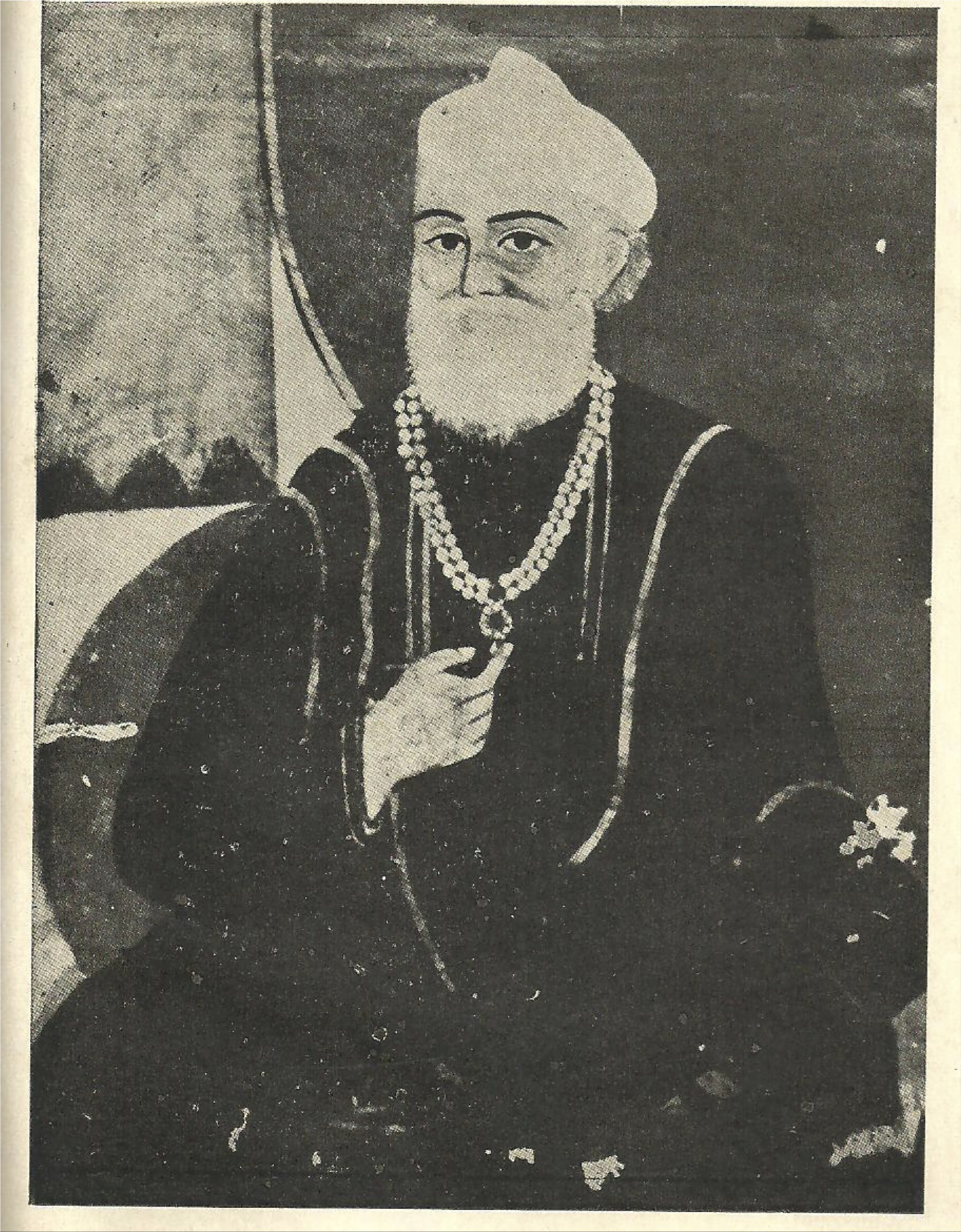
- Painting of Misr Diwan Chand, c. 1799–1849
- Born: 1755; Village Gondlanwala, Gujranwala, Durrani Empire (Present-day Punjab, Pakistan)
- Died: 18 July 1825 (aged 69–70); Lahore, Sikh Empire (Present-day Punjab, Pakistan)
- Children: Misr Beli Ram; Misr Rup Lal; Misr Sukh Raj; Misr Megh Raj; Misr Ram Kishan
- Relatives: Misr Sahib Dayal (brother); Misr Basti Ram (brother)
- Military career
- Service years: 1816 – 1825
- Rank: General
- Commands: Diwan of Pakhli; Diwan of Dhamtaur
- Known for: Military expeditions in: Multan; Kashmir; Mankera; Batala; Pathankot; Mukerian; Akalgarh; Peshawar; Nowshera
- Awards: Zafar-jung-Bahadur; Fateh-o-nusrat-nasib

Misr Diwan Chand (1755 – 18 July 1825) was a notable officer and a powerful general of Maharaja Ranjit Singh's reign. From a petty clerk he rose to the position of chief of artillery and commander-in-chief of the armies that conquered Multan and Kashmir and also served as the Commander-in-Chief of the Khalsa Army from 1816 to 1825.

== Early life ==
Diwan Chand was the son of a Brahmin shopkeeper of Gondlanwala village (in present-day Gujranwala, Pakistan).

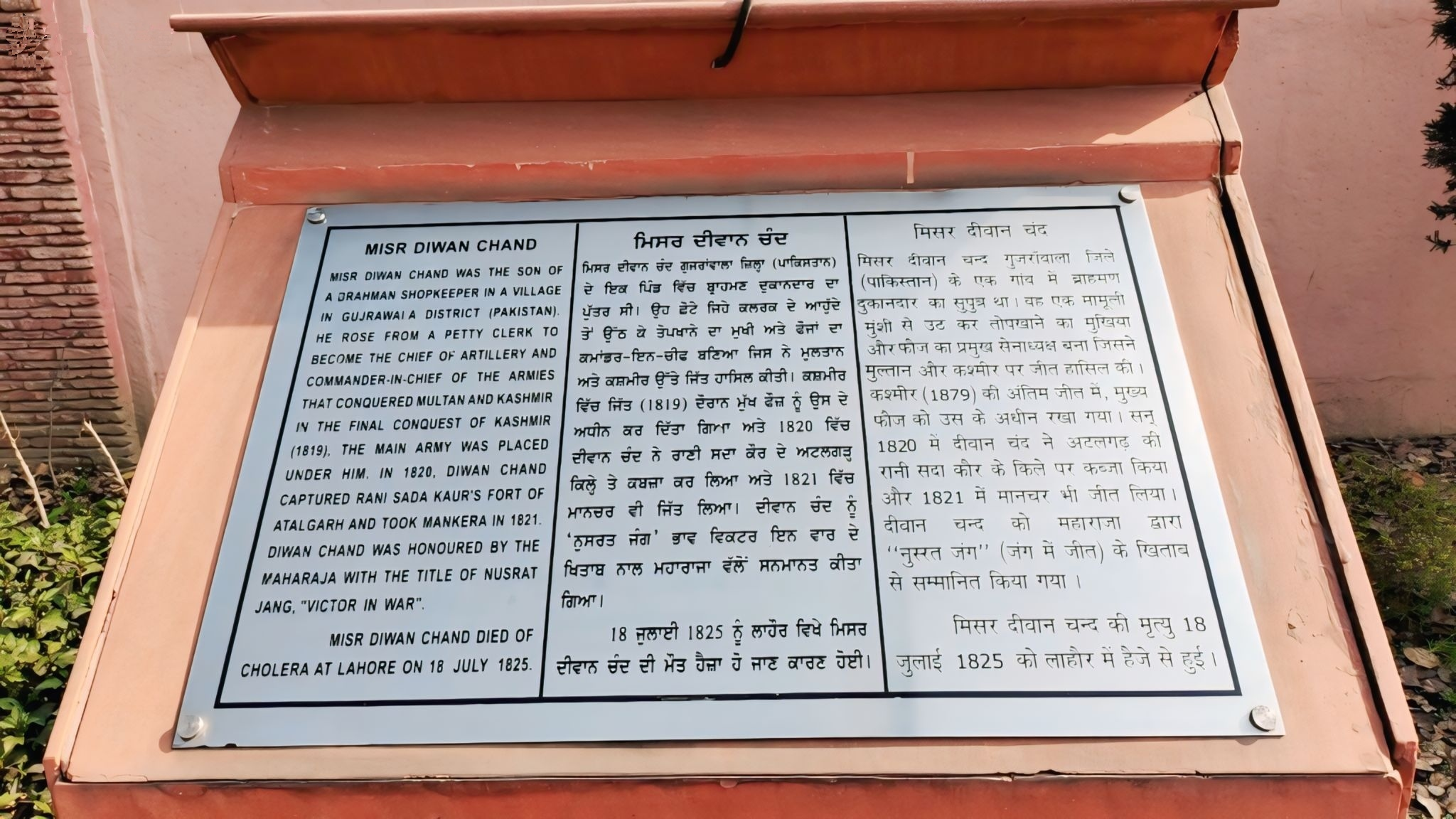
Misr Diwan Chand Panel at Gobindgarh fort Amritsar provide information about the Hindu Brahman commander of Sikh Empire responsible for the Conquest of Kashmir and Multan

== Military career ==
Diwan Chand was bestowed the title of Zafar-Jang-Bahadur—Brave Victor of Battles—by Ranjit Singh. Diwan Chand rose from the post of Artillery Chief to the Chief Commander of Khalsa Army in 1816. He suppressed the rebellion of Tiwana nawab of Mitha Tiwana and forced him to pay tribute. Diwan Chand captured Multan in 1818 and governor Muzzafar Khan and seven of his sons were killed. In 1819, he led an expedition to Shopian in Kashmir region and conquered it from Durrani governor Jabbar Khan. He defeated the Afghans in Some hours.Took Mankera present day Mankera Tehsil in 1821 and he also conquered Batala, Pathankot, Mukerian, Akalgarh etc., he also took part in the conquest of Peshawar and Nowshera.

Maharaja Ranjit Singh had a great regard for the general. Once at Amritsar, the Maharaja had purchased a very precious hookah from a Hindustani merchant, although this was against the injunctions of his own religion. He presented the hookah to Misr Diwan Chand to mark the high esteem in which he was held by the Maharaja. Permission was also given to him to smoke.

The contribution of Misr Dewan Chand in the making of the Maharaja's empire has also been under-estimated by British historians who have described him as a "hookah-smoking general'. It is a fact that Maharaja had once presented him a hookah himself.

== Title ==
He was a great warrior and general who achieved the title of Fateh-o-Nusrat-Nasib (one who never lost in war) and Zafar-Jang-Bahadur (conqueror in wars) from Maharaja Ranjit Singh himself and was made Governor of Kashmir.
