= Looni Salyal =

- Town
- Location within Punjab, Pakistan Location within Pakistan
- Coordinates: 33°26′03″N 73°21′48″E
- Country: Pakistan
- Province: Punjab
- District: Rawalpindi
- Tehsil: Kallar Syedan
- UC: Looni Salyal
- Time zone: UTC+5 (PST)
- Area code: 051

Looni Salyal is a town and capital of Union Council Looni, Tehsil Kallar Syedan, District Rawalpindi, Pakistan.

== Language ==
- Pothwari language: 90%
- Urdu 5%
- Pashto 3%
- Other 2%
