= Phalina =

- Village
- Location within Pakistan
- Coordinates: 33°24′14″N 73°19′34″E
- Country: Pakistan
- UC: Darkali Mamuri
- Tehsil: Kallar Syedan
- District: Rawalpindi
- Time zone: UTC+5 (PST)

Phalina is a village in Darkali Mamuri Union council of Kallar Syedan Tehsil, Rawalpindi District in the Punjab Province of Pakistan.

== Schools in Phalina ==
A government school for boys is also located here.

== Places of interest ==
Phalina Noor Dam may be a place of interest.
