= Saroha Rajgan =

Village in Rawalpindi District, Pakistan

Saroha Rajgan is a village in Kallar Syedan Tehsil, Rawalpindi District, Pakistan. On 1 July 2004 Saroha Rajgan became part of Tehsil Kallar Syedan, which was formerly a Union Council of Kahuta Tehsil.
