= Tal Tota =

- Union Council and Village
- Location within Punjab, Pakistan Location within Pakistan
- Coordinates: 33°21′58″N 73°21′25″E
- Country: Pakistan
- Region: Punjab
- District: Rawalpindi District
- Tehsil: Kallar Syedan
- Capital: Tal Tota
- Time zone: UTC+5 (PST)
- Area code: 051

Tal Tota is a village and union council in Punjab, Pakistan.

On 1 July 2004, Tal Tota became the Union Council of Tehsil Kallar Syedan. Rawalpindi District was a Union Council of the Tehsil Kahuta.
