= Mangloora Union Council =

Mangloora
- Union Council
- govt high school mangloora
- Location within Punjab, Pakistan Location within Pakistan
- Coordinates: 33°23′52″N 73°23′47″E
- Country: Pakistan
- Region: Punjab
- District: Rawalpindi District
- Tehsil: Kallar Syedan
- na 53: Mangloora

Government
  - Type: councilar javed butt

Population
  - Total: 8,000
- Time zone: UTC+5 (PST)
- Area code: 051

Mangloora is a small village in union council kallar syedan in Punjab province Pakistan.

On 1 July 2004, Mangloora became the Union Council of Tehsil Kallar Syeda. Rawalpindi District was a Union Council of the Tehsil Kahuta.صاٸراز
