= Manyanda =

- Union Council and Village
- Location within Punjab, Pakistan Location within Pakistan
- Coordinates: 33°28′32″N 73°32′51″E
- Country: Pakistan
- Region: Punjab
- District: Rawalpindi District
- Tehsil: Kallar Syedan
- Capital: Manyanda
- Time zone: UTC+5 (PST)
- Area code: 051

Manyanda is a village and a union council of Kallar Syedan Tehsil in Rawalpindi District Punjab, Pakistan. Manyanda Coms under Choha Khalsa Circle Union Councils Manyanda was under NA-50, National Assembly and PP-2, Punjab Assembly. After (Delimitation 2018) Nala Musalmana came under NA-58, National Assembly and PP-7, Punjab Assembly.

== Geography ==
Kallar Syedan, the capital city, is a main shopping center for the people. The countryside surrounding the town is typical of Potohar Plateau landscape. It is surrounded by several smaller towns along with the main towns: ChowkPindori, Choha Khalsa, Doberan Kallan, Kanoha and Sir Suba Shah. The fertile land of the Union Council Manyanda region grows crops such as wheat, corn and peanuts.

== Language ==
- Pothwari language: 100%

== Schools in Manyanda ==
- Government Boys High School SIR SUBA SHAH, MANIANDA, KALLAR SYEDAN
- Government Boys Elementary School Khad, UC Manianda, Kallar Syedan
