= Chaudhary Sajid Mehmood =

Pakistani politician

Member of the Provincial Assembly of the Punjab
- In office 15 August 2018 – 14 January 2023
- Constituency: PP-9 Rawalpindi-IV

Personal details
- Party: PPP (2025-present)
- Other political affiliations: PTI (2018-2023)

Chaudhary Sajid Mehmood is a Pakistani politician who had been a member of the Provincial Assembly of the Punjab from August 2018 till January 2023.

== Political career ==
He ran for the Provincial Assembly of the Punjab as a candidate of the Pakistan Tehreek-e-Insaf (PTI) from PP-4 Rawalpindi-IV in the 2013 Punjab provincial election, but was unsuccessful. He received 36,886 votes and was defeated by Raja Shaukat Aziz Bhatti, a candidate of the Pakistan Muslim League (N) (PML(N)).

He was elected to the Provincial Assembly of the Punjab as a candidate of the PTI from PP-9 Rawalpindi-IV in the 2018 Punjab provincial election. He received 51,686 votes and defeated Chaudhry Sarfaraz Ahmad Khan, a candidate of Pakistan Peoples Party (PPP).

On 29 October 2023, he left the PTI.
