= Doberan Kallan =

Town in Punjab, Pakistan

- Union Council and Town
- Location within Punjab, Pakistan Location within Pakistan
- Coordinates: 33°26′52″N 73°30′19″E
- Country: Pakistan
- Region: Punjab
- District: Rawalpindi District
- Tehsil: Kallar Syedan
- Capital: Doberan Kallan

Population
  - Total: 7,632
- 2017 Pakistani census
- Time zone: UTC+5 (PST)
- Area code: 051

Doberan Kallan is a town and a union council of Kallar Syedan Tehsil in Rawalpindi District Punjab, Pakistan.

Doberan Kallan comes under Choha Khalsa Circle Union Councils. Doberan Kallan was under NA-50, National Assembly and PP-2, Punjab Assembly. After (Delimitation 2018), Doberan Kallan came under NA-58, National Assembly and PP-7, Punjab Assembly.

== Population ==
Doberan Kallan town's total population per 2017 Pakistani census is 7632.

== Historic gurdwara in Doberan Kalan ==
There is a historic Sikh gurdwara in Doberan Kallan town.
