= Bishandot =

- Town
- Interactive map of Bishandot
- Coordinates: 33.4344°N 73.2846°E
- Country: Pakistan
- Province: Punjab
- District: Islamabad

Government
  - Type: Union Council
  - Body: Bishandote Union Council

Bishandot is a town in Islamabad, Pakistan. It is 5 km southeast of the town of Rawat and 15 km southeast of the city of Islamabad.

GPS Bishandot is the local Government Primary School for girls in Bishandot.
