= Jamia Masjid =

The term Jamia Masjid may refer to:

- Jamia Masjid, Srinagar
- Jamia Masjid, Shopian
- Jamia Masjid, Banbhore
- Jamia Mosque (Hong Kong)
- Jamia Mosque (Kenya)
- Grand Jamia Mosque, Lahore
- Grand Jamia Mosque (Karachi)
- Jamia Masjid, Sopore
- Jamia Masjid Wah Cantt
- Shahi Jamia Mosque
- Jamia Masjid Bilal
