= Kallar Syedan Tehsil =

Administrative Tehsil subdivision in Punjab, Pakistan

Kallar Syedan کلر سیداں
- کلرسیداں
- Location within Punjab, Pakistan Location within Pakistan
- Coordinates: 33°24′52″N 73°22′43″E
- Country: Pakistan
- Region: Punjab
- District: Rawalpindi District
- Tehsil: Tehsil Kallar Syedan
- Capital City: Kallar Syedan
- Towns: 15
- Union councils: 23

Government
  - Type: TMA

Area
  - Total: 421 km^{2} (163 sq mi)
- Elevation: 520 m (1,710 ft)

Population (2017)
  - Total: 217,273
- Time zone: UTC+5 (PST)
- Postal code: 46000
- Area code: 051

Kallar Syedan is a tehsil in the Rawalpindi District, Punjab, Pakistan. Earlier, it was a part of the Kahuta Tehsil; it became a separate tehsil on 1 July 2004.

Kallar Syedan is the capital of the tehsil.

== Demography ==
According to the 2017 census of Pakistan, Kallar Syedan Tehsil has a total population of 217,273. Many clans are live in Kallar Syedan Tehsil, such as the Kashmiri Bhatt tribes, the Janjua Rajput tribe, the Mughal tribe Baig (Looni Sahlyal), the Mengal tribe, Budhal tribe, clan of Awan (Mangal Rajgan), the Saroha Rajgan tribe, Gujjars, the Awan, the Raeen (Minhas), the Ghakhar Kiani tribe, the Muhajir Siddiqui, the Mughal tribe, the Sheikh tribe, the Rajputs, the Malik tribe, and others.

== Administrative divisions ==
The tehsil is divided into 11 Union Councils:

- Municipal Committee Kallar Syedan City
  - Kallar Sagwal
  - Kallar Badhal
  - Tota
  - Mera Sangal
  - Mangloora
  - Kambili
  - Sadiq
  - Looni Salyal
  - Darkali Shershahi
  - Mangal Rajgan
  - Saroha
  - Jocha
  - Mamdot
  - Jaswala
  - Darkali Mamuri
- Choha Khalsa Circle Union Councils
  - Nala Musalmana
  - Manyanda
  - Samote
  - Choha Khalsa
  - Kanoha
  - Doberan Kallan
- Kallar Syedan Circle Union Councils
  - Bhala Khar
  - Guff
  - Ghazan Abad
  - Bishandote

== Delimitation 2018 ==
- After the delimitation in 2018 by the Election Commission of Pakistan, Kallar Syedan Tehsil is divided into two parts in National Assembly of Pakistan: (1) Municipal Committee Kallar Syedan City and Kallar Syedan Circle Union Councils, comes under NA-57 (Rawalpindi-I), and (2) Choha Khalsa Circle,which includes which includes 6 Union Councils and Comes under NA-58 (Rawalpindi-II).
- In Provincial Assembly of Punjab, Kallar Syedan Tehsil is divided into three parts: k Municipal Committee Kallar Syedan City and Choha Khalsa Circle,which includes 6 union Councils come under PP-7 (Rawalpindi-II), (2) KallarSyedan Circle union Council Bishandote and Village Arazi Khas are under PP-9 (Rawalpindi-IV) and (3) Kallar Syedan Circle Union Councils Bhalakhar, Gufl and Ghazan Abad are under PP-10 (Rawalpindi-V).

== Towns and villages ==
Mangal Rajgan

== Notable people ==
- Tikka Khan, Army Chief of Staff (1972–1976), Governor of East Pakistan (1971), Governor of Punjab (1988–1990)
- Abdul Aziz Mirza, Chief of Naval Staff, ambassador to Saudi Arabia
- Khem Singh Bedi, descendants of Guru Nanak Dev ji (1469 - 1539), founder and first guru of Sikhism

== Places of interest ==
- Bedi Mahal
- Sangni Fort
- Pharwala Fort
- Phalina Noor Dam
- Old Gurdwara in Kanoha

== Gallery ==
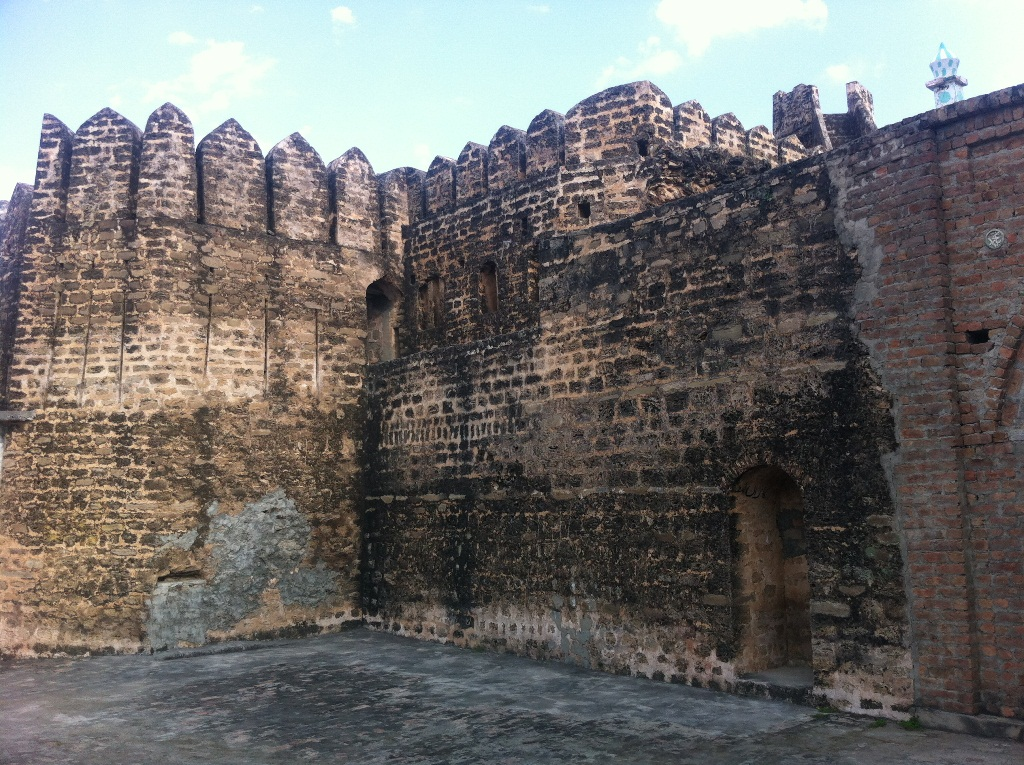
ToursSA

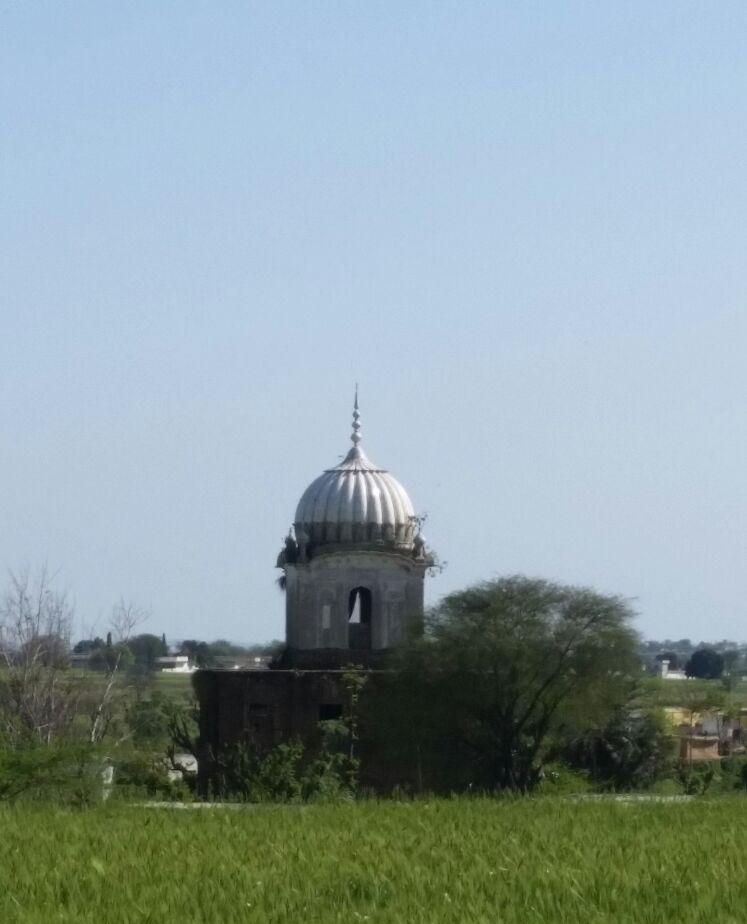
Old Gurdwara Kallar Syedan

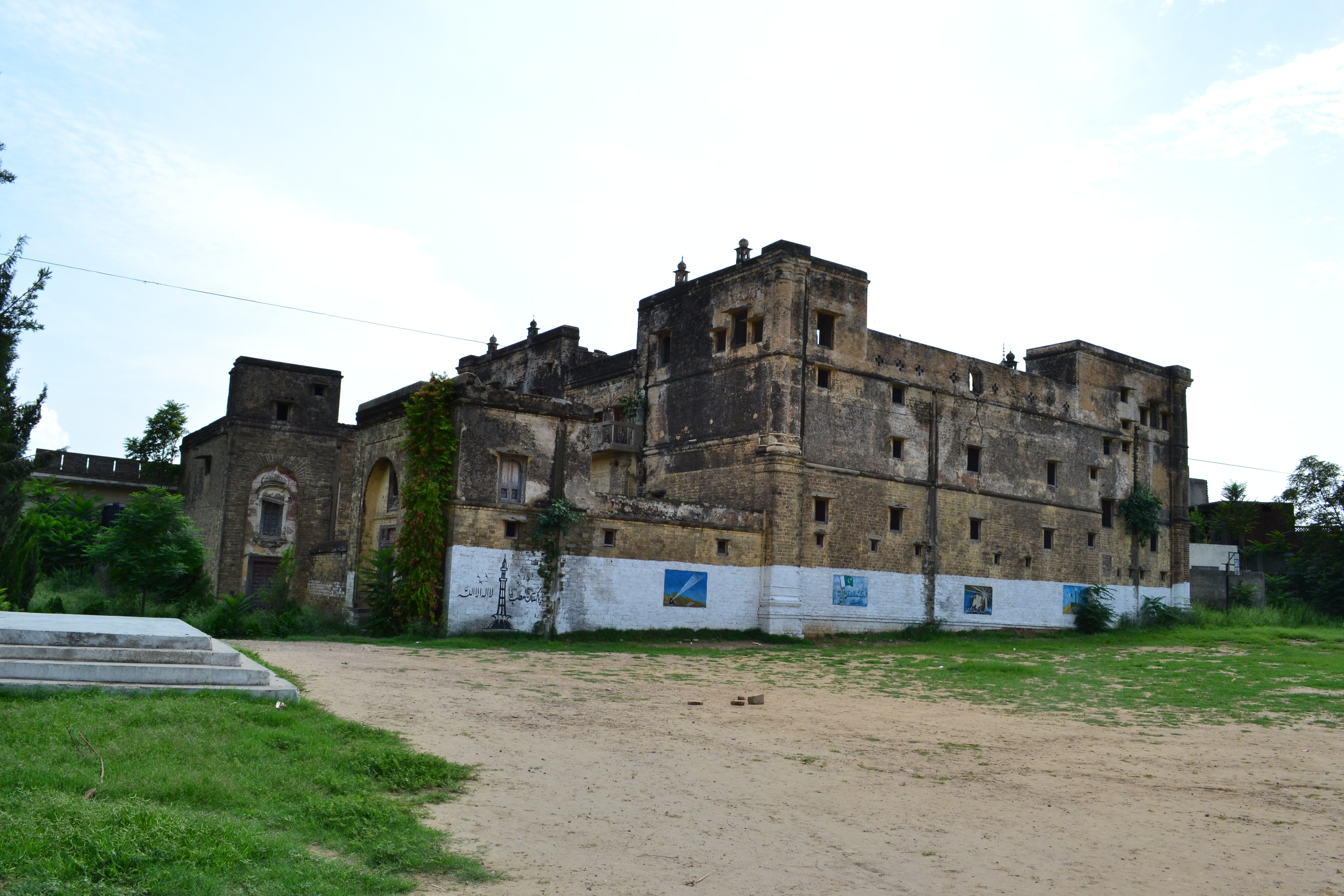
Bedi Mahal

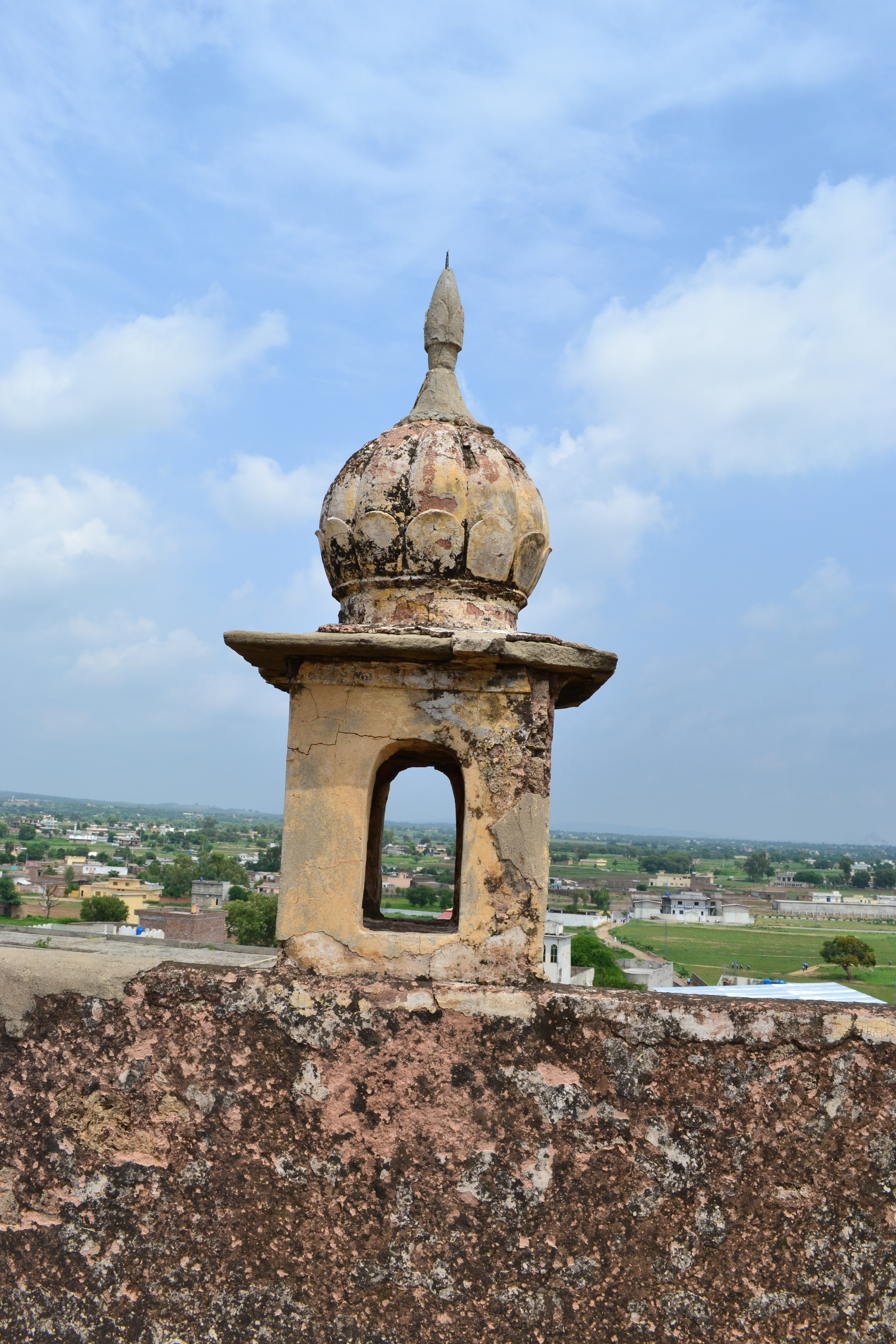
Bedi Mahal top

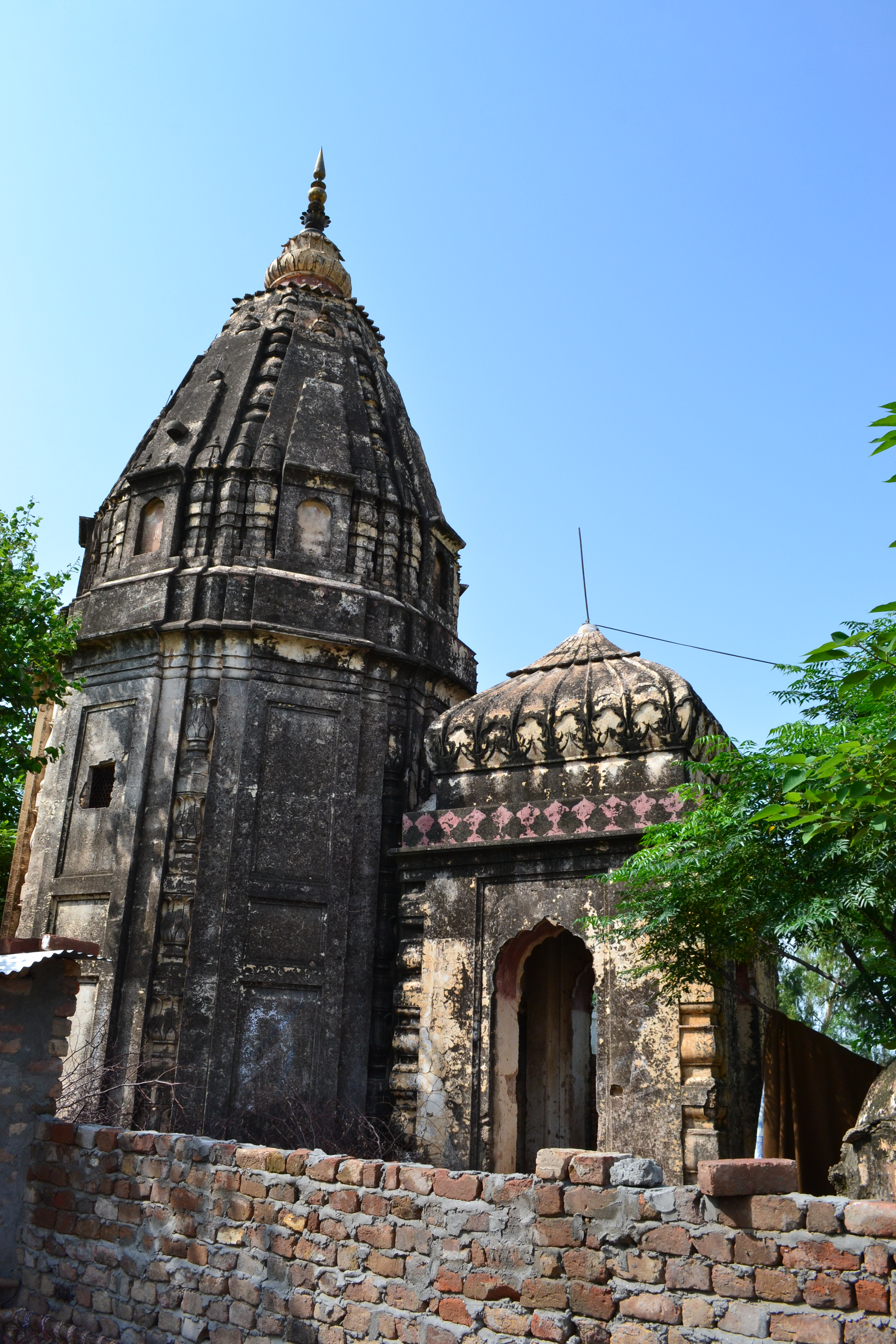
Karishan Mandir

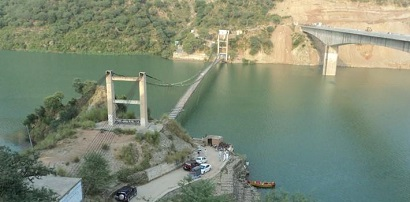
Dhan Gali Bridge
