= Mera Sangal =

- Union Council and Town
- Location within Punjab, Pakistan Location within Pakistan
- Coordinates: 33°26′44″N 73°21′19″E
- Country: Pakistan
- Region: Punjab
- District: Rawalpindi District
- Tehsil: Kallar Syedan
- Capital: Mera Sangal
- Time zone: UTC+5 (PST)
- Area code: 051

Mera Sangal (also called Mera Singhal) is a small Town and union council in Punjab, Pakistan. It is within Kallar Syedan Tehsil.

On 1 July 2004, Mera Sangal became the Union Council of Tehsil Kallar Syeda. Rawalpindi District was a Union Council of the Tehsil Kahuta. Its population is estimated at 100,000-200,000, the vast majority of whom are Muslims who speak Pothwari and/or Punjabi.

The local economy is based on agriculture, though many female residents also are clothiers and tailors. Other former citizens have emigrated and support their families through foreign income. Most residents use public transportation – buses, rickshaws and vans – as their primary means of modality.
