= Dhamali =

Dhamali धमाली
- Former Village development committee
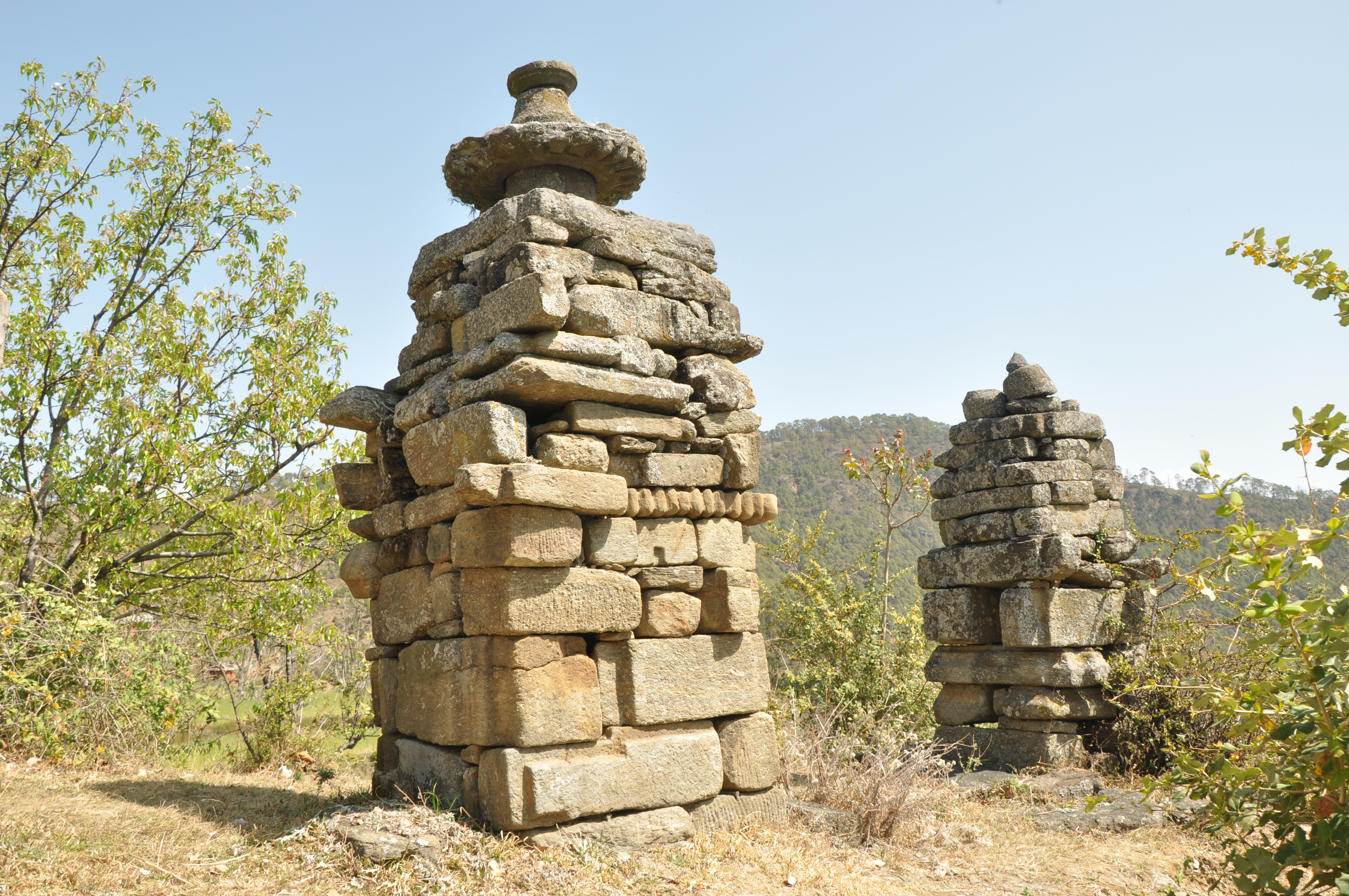

- Location in Nepal
- Coordinates: 29.01°N 81.37°E
- Country: Nepal
- Zone: Seti Zone
- District: Achham District

Population (2001)
  - Total: 4,111
  - Religions: Hindu
- Time zone: UTC+5:45 (Nepal Time)

Dhamali was a village in Achham District in the Seti Zone (currently Koshi province) of western Nepal. It was then merged into the Turmakhand Rural Municipality along with Bhairabsthan, Turmakhad, Nada, Raniban, Toshi VDCs when the new constitution was introduced in 2015AD. At the time of the 1991 Nepal census, the village had a population of 3212 living in 638 houses. At the time of the 2001 Nepal census, the population was 4111, of which 25% was literate.
