= Ghazan Abad =

- Union Council
- Location within Punjab, Pakistan Location within Pakistan
- Coordinates: 33°28′42″N 73°17′45″E
- Country: Pakistan
- Region: Punjab
- District: Rawalpindi District
- Tehsil: Kallar Syedan
- Capital: Ghazan Abad

Population
  - Total: 30,000
- Time zone: UTC+5 (PST)
- Area code: 051

Ghazan Abad is a Town and a union council in Punjab, Pakistan.

On 1 July 2004, Ghazan Abad became the Union Council of Tehsil Kallar Syeda. Rawalpindi District was a Union Council of the Tehsil Kahuta.
