= Nala Musalmana =

- Union Council
- Location within Punjab, Pakistan Location within Pakistan
- Coordinates: 33°28′32″N 73°32′51″E
- Country: Pakistan
- Region: Punjab
- District: Rawalpindi District
- Tehsil: Kallar Syedan
- Capital: Nala Musalmana
- Villages: 19
- Time zone: UTC+5 (PST)
- Area code: 051

Nala Musalmana is a village and a union council of Kallar Syedan Tehsil in Rawalpindi District Punjab, Pakistan.
