= Mirza Kambili =

- Union Council Sui Cheemia l and Village
- Location within Punjab, Pakistan Location within Pakistan
- Coordinates: 33°22′49″N 73°21′02″E
- Country: Pakistan
- Region: Punjab
- District: Rawalpindi District
- Tehsil: Gujar Khan
- Capital: Islamabad

Government
  - Consalar: Haji Mazhar Hussain Abbasi
- Time zone: UTC+5 (PST)
- Area code: 051

Mirza Kambili Kambili is a village and union council in Punjab, Pakistan.

On 26 November 2025, Mirza Kambili became the Union Council of Sui Cheemia Tehsil Gujar Khan. Rawalpindi District was a Union Council of the Tehsil Kahuta.
