= Gondlanwala, Gujranwala =

Town

Coordinates: 32°11′55.6″N 74°07′37.2″E

Gondlanwala گوندلانوالہ
- Village
- Gondlanwala
- Interactive map of Gondlanwala
- Country: Pakistan
- Province: Punjab
- District: Gujranwala

Gondlanwala is a village located in Gujranwala District in Pakistan's province of Punjab. Gujranwala, the nearest city is 3 miles away.
