= PP-10 Rawalpindi-IV =

Punjab provincial constituency

- Constituency for the Provincial Assembly of Punjab
- District: Rawalpindi Tehsil (partly) and Rawalpindi City (partly) of Rawalpindi District

Current constituency
- Member: Vacant
- Created from: PP-5 Rawalpindi-V and PP-7 Rawalpindi-VII

PP-10 Rawalpindi-IV (پی پی-10، راولپنڈى-4) is a Constituency of Provincial Assembly of Punjab.

== Election 2008 ==
General elections were held on 18 February 2008. Raja Qamar Ul Isalm of Pakistan Muslim League (Q) this seat by securing 34252 votes.

Provincial election 2008: PP-5 Rawalpind-IV
Party	Candidate	Votes	%	±%
PML(Q)	Eng. Raja Qamar-ul-Islam	34,252	29.47	
PML(N)	Raja Anwar	32,356	27.83	
PPP	Barrister Ch. Zafar Iqbal	31,040	26.70	
Independent	Raja Abdul Waheed Qasim	11,470	9.87	
Independent	Group Captain(R) Mushtaq Ahmed Kayani	2,453	2.11	
Independent	Ch. Hamid Latif Advocate	2,434	2.09	
Independent	Nabeela Inam	1,128	0.97	
MMA	Muhammad Zaheer Akhtar Mujadidi	756	0.65	
Independent	Syed Tanveer Hussain Shah	271	0.23	
Independent	Raja Muhammad Younas	85	0.07	
Turnout		118,682	62.27	
Total valid votes		116,245	97.95	
Rejected ballots		2,437	2.05	
Majority		1,896	1.64	
Registered electors		190,595		

== Election 2013 ==
General elections were held on 11 May 2013. Qamar Ul Isalm Raja won this seat with 65,445 votes.

Provincial election 2013: PP-5 RawalpindiV
Party	Candidate	Votes	%	±%
PML(N)	Qamar UI Islam Raja	65,445	50.46	
PML(Q)	Malik Sohail Ashraf	27,039	20.85	
PTI	Muhammad Haroon Kamal Hashmi	15,139	11.67	
Independent	Ismail Hussain Shah	12,636	9.74	
PPP	Sardar Muhammad Iqbal Khan	3,030	2.34	
Independent	Malik Shaukat Ali Awan	2,509	1.93	
JI	Khalid Mehmood Mirza	1,521	1.17	
Others	Others (nine candidates)	2,384	1.84	
Turnout		132,634	59.89	
Total valid votes		129,703	97.79	
Rejected ballots		2,931	2.21	
Majority		38,406	29.61	
Registered electors		221,451		

== Election 2018 ==
General elections are scheduled to be held on 25 July 2018. In 2018 Pakistani general election, Chaudhary Nisar Ali Khan an Independent politician won PP-10 Rawalpindi V election by taking 53,212 votes.

Provincial election 2018: PP-10 Rawalpindi-V
Party	Candidate	Votes	%	±%
Independent	Ch. Nisar Ali Khan	53,212	33.35	
Independent	Naseer UI Husnain Shah	22,271	13.96	
PTI	Naveed Sultana	19,286	12.09	
Independent	Muhammad Afzal	17,117	10.73	
PML(N)	Raja Qamr UI Islam	15,328	9.61	
TLP	Muhammad Abdul Latif Tayyeb	13,691	8.58	
Independent	Chaudhry Muhamamad Kamran Ali Khan	4,331	2.71	
PTI-N	Ch Muhammad Ameer Afzal	4,305	2.70	
PST	Raja Shafakat Iqbal	3,336	2.09	
MMA	Khalid Mehmood Mirza	2,700	1.69	
PPP	Pervez Akhtar Mirza	2,171	1.36	
Independent	Safdar Ali Khan	1,166	0.73	
Others	Others (three candidates)	654	0.41	
Turnout		165,023	61.12	
Total valid votes		159,568	96.94	
Rejected ballots		5,455	3.06	
Majority		30,941	19.39	
Registered electors		270,004		

== General elections 2024 ==
Provincial election 2024: PP-10 Rawalpindi-IV
Party	Candidate	Votes	%	±%
PML(N)	Naeem Ejaz	48,759	32.29	
Independent	Chudhary Muhammad Asif	34,415	22.79	
Independent	Chaudhary Nisar Ali Khan	31,112	20.60	
TLP	Ch Muhammad Sajjad Qaisar	17,451	11.56	
Independent	Chaudhary Muhammad Kamran Ali Khan	10,146	6.72	
JI	Khalid Mehmood Mirza	2,972	1.97	
Others	Others (seventeen candidates)	6,172	4.07	
Turnout		154,928	56.26	
Total valid votes		151,027	97.48	
Rejected ballots		3,901	2.52	
Majority		14,344	9.50	
Registered electors		275,358		
hold				

== See also ==
- PP-9 Rawalpindi-III
- PP-11 Rawalpindi-V
