= Bhala Khar =

- Union Council and Village
- Location within Punjab, Pakistan Location within Pakistan
- Coordinates: 33°28′2″N 73°25′06″E
- Country: Pakistan
- Region: Punjab
- District: Rawalpindi District
- Tehsi: Kallar Syedan
- Capital: Bhala Khar

Population
  - Total: 30,000
- Time zone: UTC+5 (PST)
- Area code: 051

Bhala Khar (also Palākhar, Bhalakar, Bhalākaris) is a village and union council in Punjab, Pakistan.

On 1 July 2004, Bhala Khar became the Union Council of Tehsil Kallar Syeda. Rawalpindi District was a Union Council of the Tehsil Kahuta.

"Palakhar" is a combination of two words 'polkh' and 'kaar'. The first word, 'polkh', refers to Polakh Khan Gakhar, the father of Sultan Hathi Gakhar. Hathi Gakhar was the chief of the Pothwar region, and fought against the Mughal emperor Zahir ud-din Muhammad. The second word, 'kaar', means "home", as it was the home of Polakh Gakhar, who is buried in Bhala Khar along with Zahir ud deen Babur.
