= Bedi Mahal =

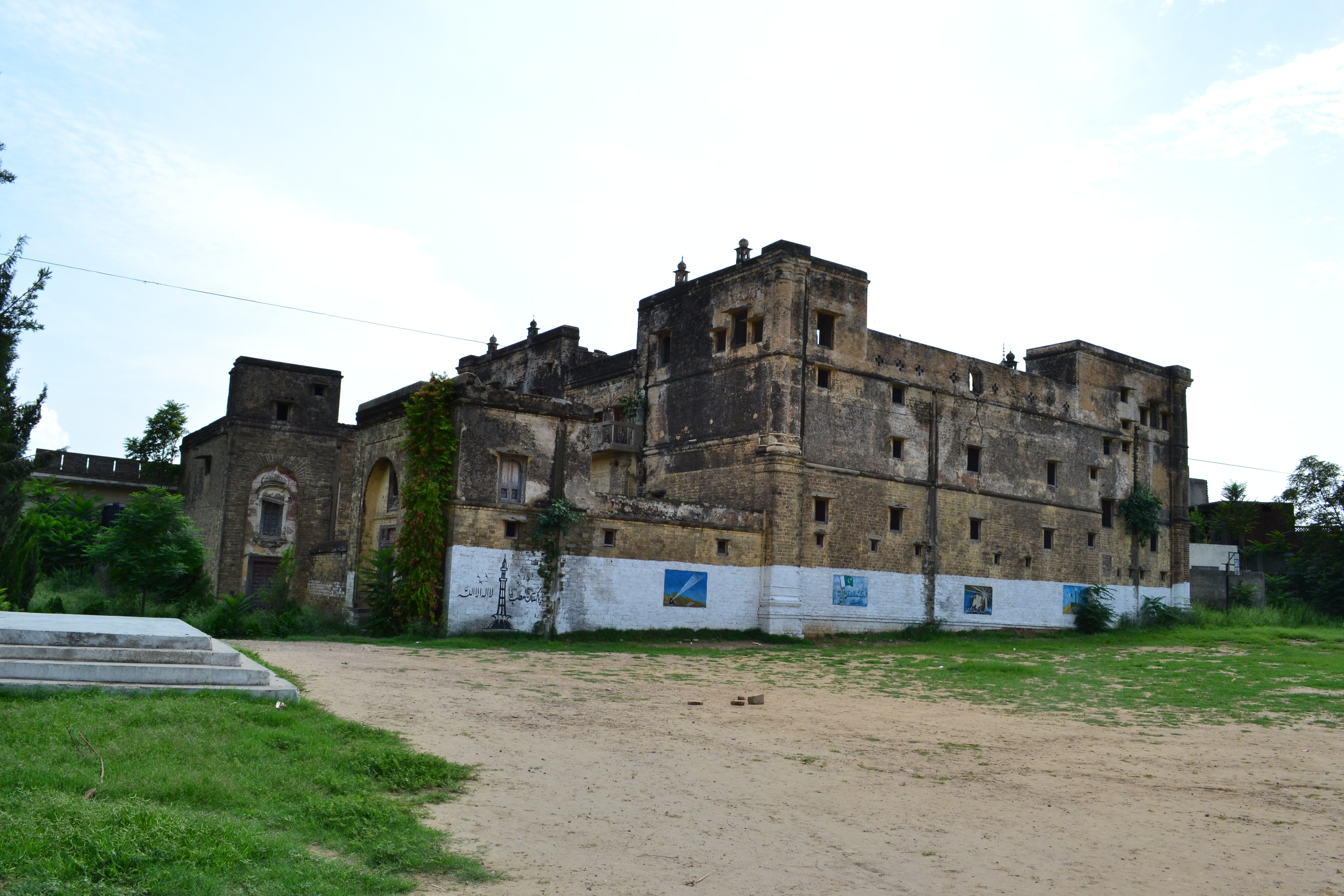
- View of Bedi Mahal

General information
- Type: Haveli
- Architectural style: Sikh architecture
- Location: Kallar Syedan, Rawalpindi district, Punjab, Pakistan
- Year built: 1850s
- Owner: Khem Singh Bedi

Bedi Mahal (meaning "Bedi house"), also known as Khem Singh Bedi's Haveli, or simply known as Babay Da Mehal (meaning "the old man's palace"), is a palace situated in Kallar Syedan some 40 kilometres away from Islamabad in Rawalpindi District, Punjab, Pakistan.

Bedi Mahal is now mostly used for shooting television advertisements or as a tourist site for Punjabi Sikhs.

== History ==
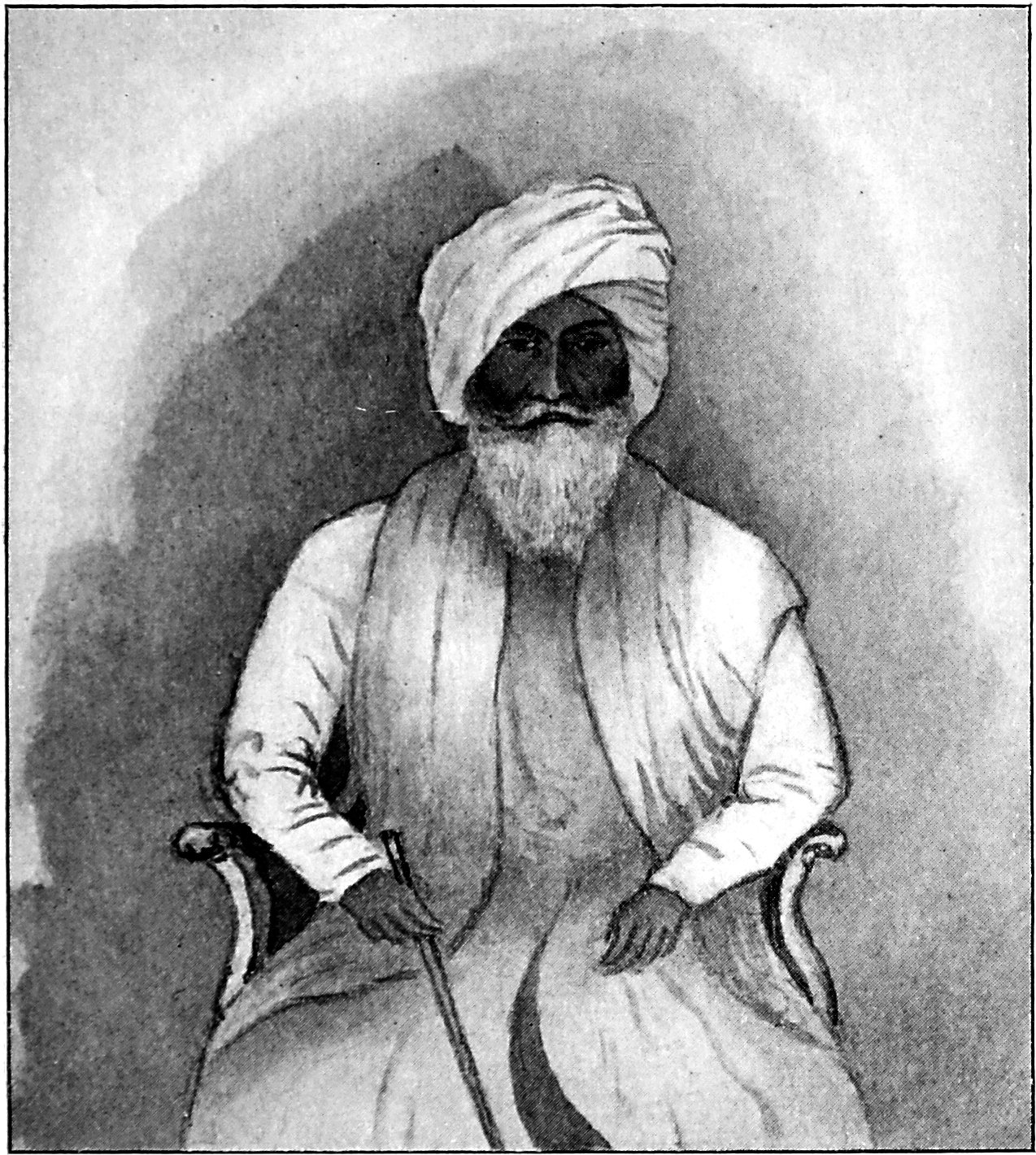
Khem Singh Bedi

The palace was built by a Sikh spiritual and political leader who was the direct descendant, in the fourteenth place, of Guru Nanak, Baba Khem Singh Bedi in the later half of the 19th century. When Khem Singh Bedi's was aged 16 (circa 1848), his family moved to Kallar Syedan. He earned funds from serving the British in the colonial service and helping them crush the 1857 rebellion and local uprisings, he used the money to open over 50 schools in Rawalpindi district whilst a remainder was used to constructed the Bedi Mahal.

It is estimated to have been constructed in the 1850s in the Sikh architectural style. The materials used for its construction consisted of sandstone and burnt clay (lime surkhi). The intricate wall paintings and carvings were made by masons and artisans from nearby Attock.

During the haveli's heyday, it also had a small zoo full of exotic creatures. There was also an orchard and stable.

During the partition of Punjab, the haveli was used as a safe haven for between 400–5000 Sikhs to protect them from communal violence.

After the partition of Punjab, it was turned into a school, named Government Boys High School Kallar Syedan.

== Architecture ==
The villa, an archetype of a haveli, encompasses five levels: a basement, ground floor, and three upper floors. The total number of rooms is disputed, with claims varying from 22 to potentially over 40. One claim puts the number of rooms originally at 84.

Architecturally, the haveli is divided into two distinct sections. The left primarily serves residential purposes with a layout centralized around a courtyard, while the right, likely used for social and religious events, contains a grand hall and several smaller rooms that could have served various functions.

The interior is rich with frescoes and murals, many in a state of decay. A few notable ones include depictions of the 9th Sikh Guru, Tegh Bahadur, and the Golden Temple of Amritsar. Murals in the courtyard, however, remain relatively well-preserved and feature Sikh figures, Hindu deities, and ascetics.

Constructed with ashlar masonry walls bonded with lime and jute fiber mortar, the haveli's structure is robust, despite decay in its wooden components, suggesting potential for future restoration.

Verandahs located in the main courtyard of the Bedi Mahal with various frescoes

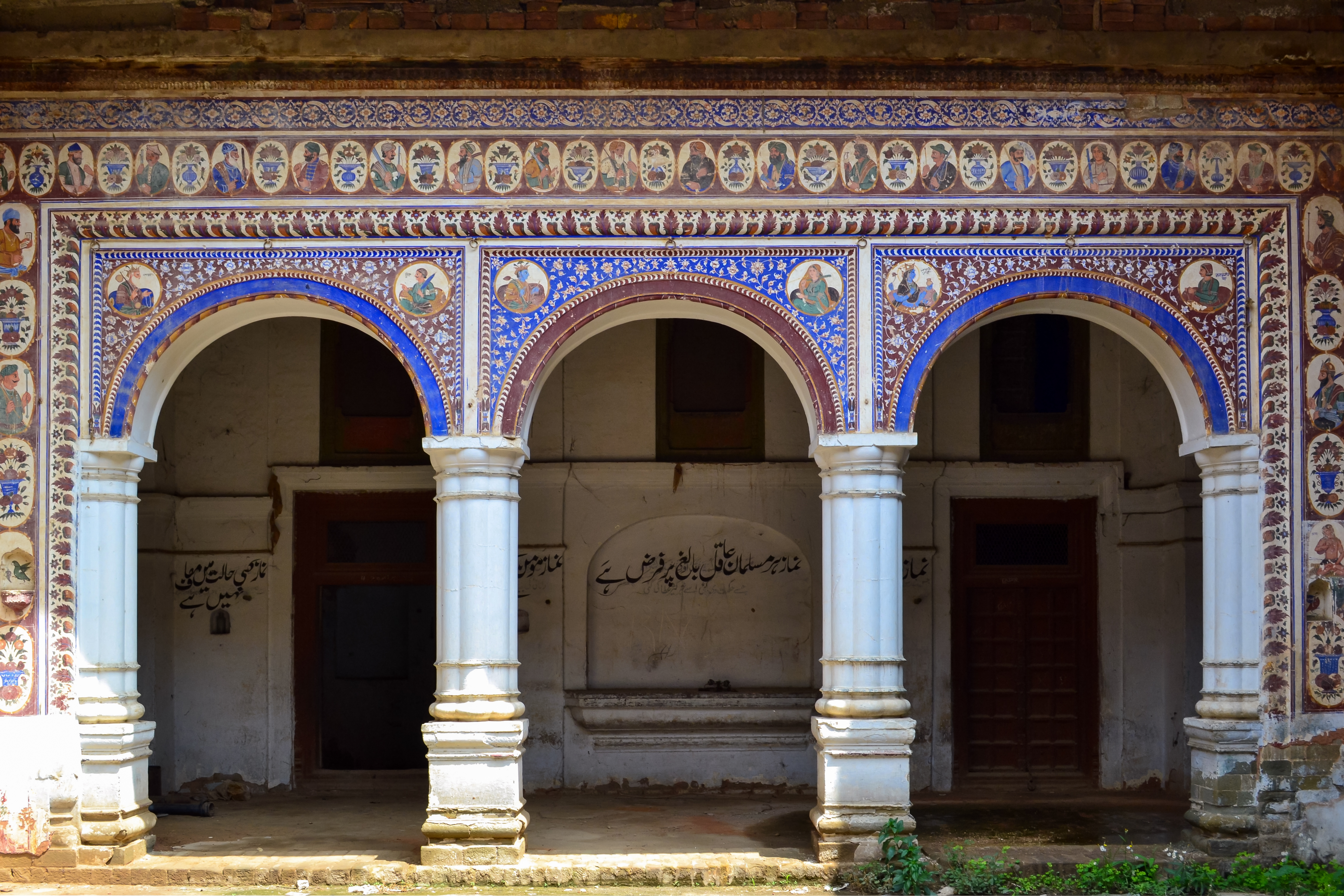

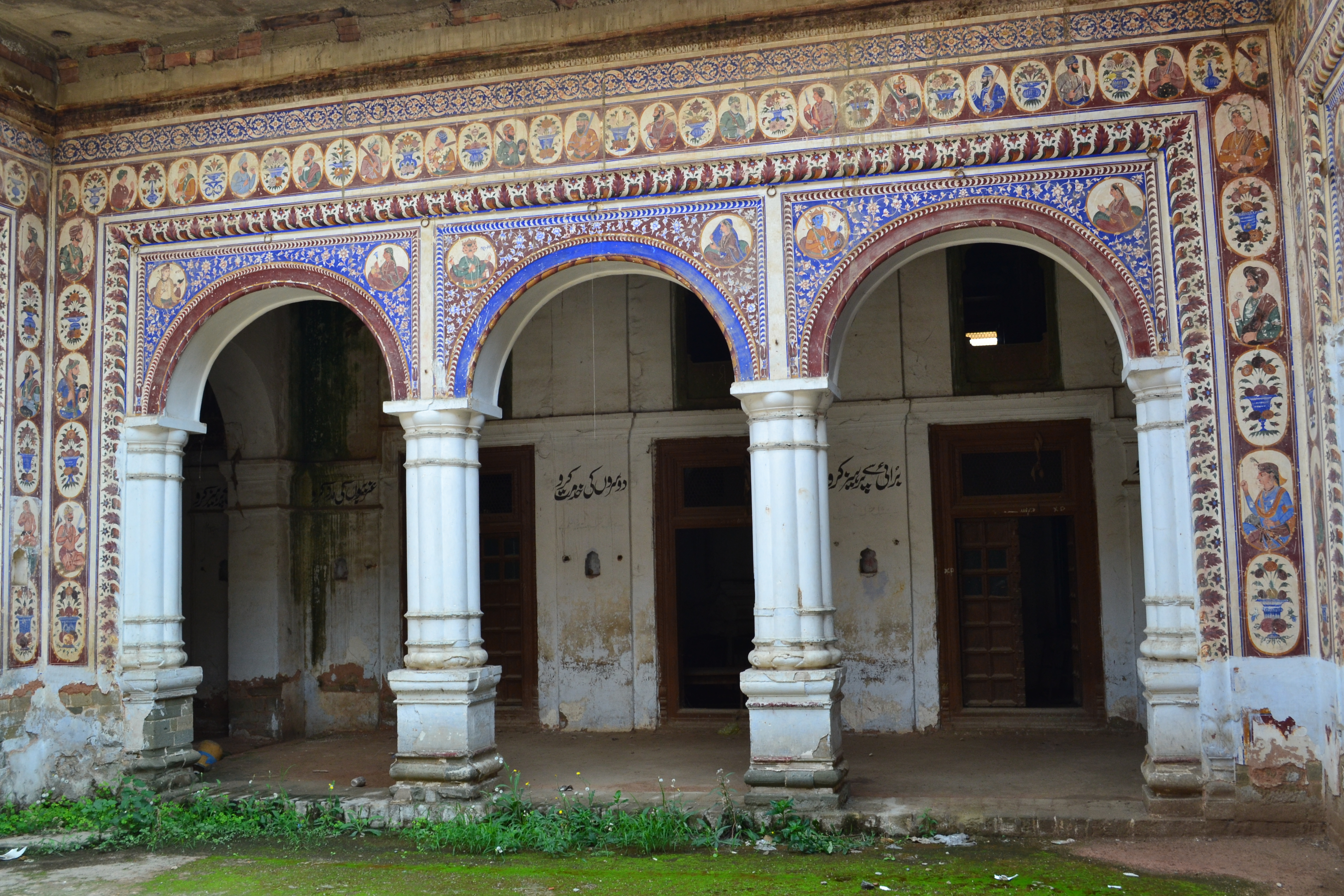

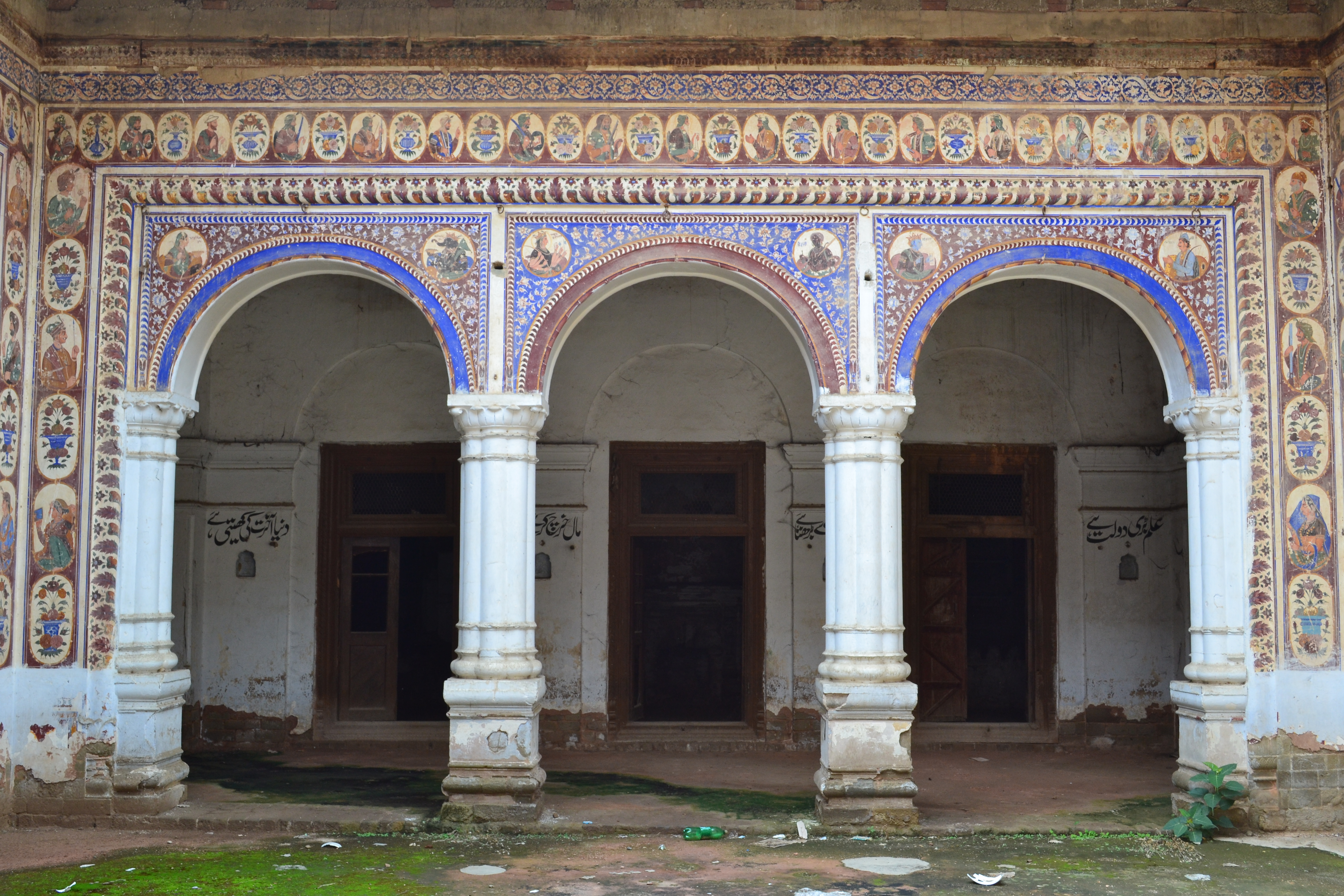

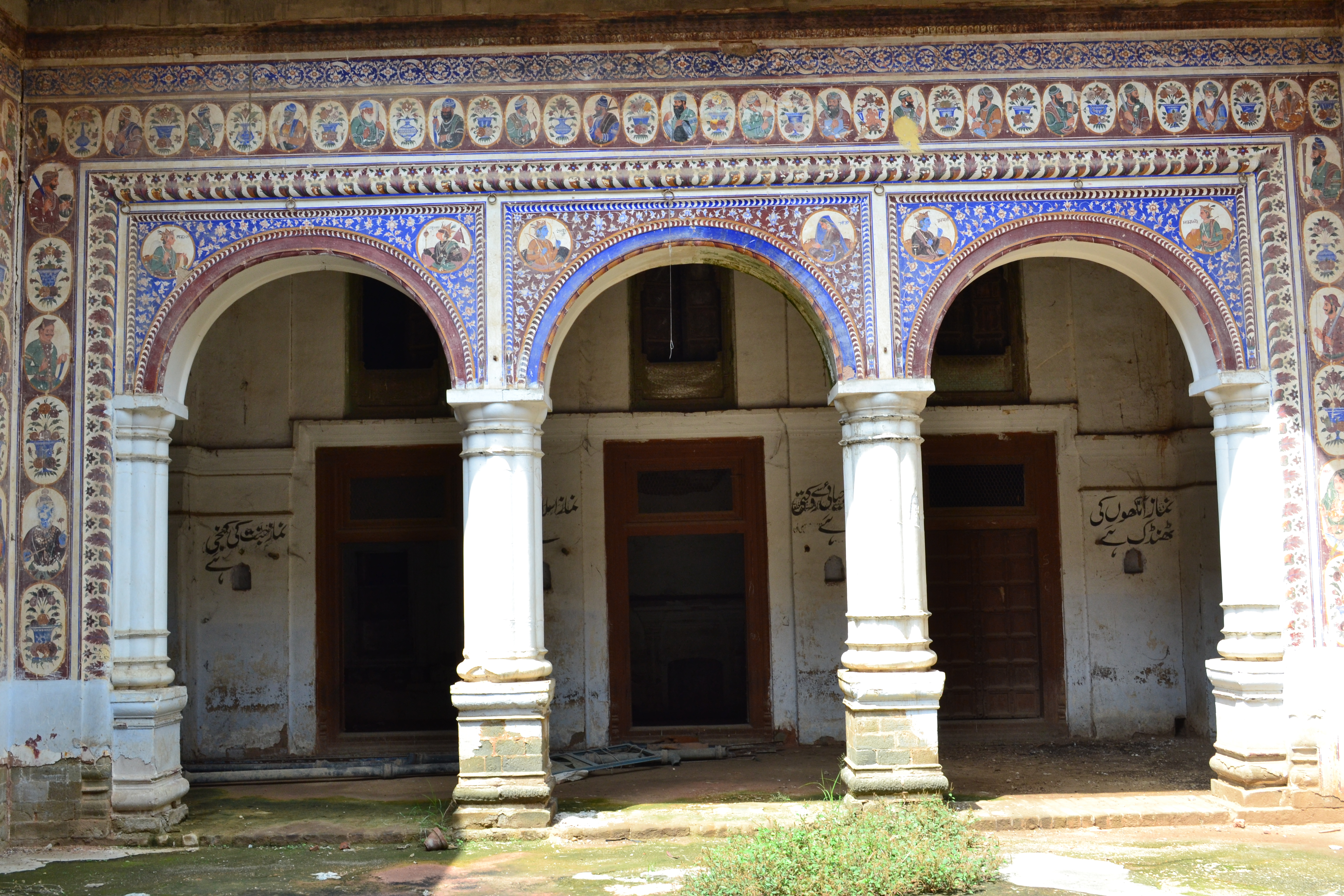

== See also ==
- List of palaces in Pakistan
- Haveli Sujan Singh
