= Bishandote Union Council =

Bishandote
- Union Council
- Location within Punjab, Pakistan Location within Pakistan
- Coordinates: 33°26′2″N 73°17′06″E
- Country: Pakistan
- Region: Punjab
- District: Rawalpindi District
- Tehsil: Kallar Syedan
- Capital: Bishandote
- Villages: 21

Population
  - Total: 30,000
- Time zone: UTC+5 (PST)
- Area code: 051

Bishandote Union Council is a union council in Punjab, Pakistan.

On 1 July 2004, Bishandote became the Union Council of Tehsil Kallar Syeda. Rawalpindi District was a Union Council of the Tehsil Kahuta.
