= Arazi Khas =

- Town
- Location within Pakistan
- Coordinates: 33°27′20″N 73°18′55″E
- Country: Pakistan
- Tehsil: Kallar Syedan
- District: Rawalpindi
- Time zone: UTC+5 (PST)

Arazi Khas is a Small Town in Kallar Syedan Tehsil of Rawalpindi District in the Punjab Province of Pakistan.
