= Sangni Fort =

19th-century fort in Pakistan

Coordinates: 33°22′18″N 73°27′0″E

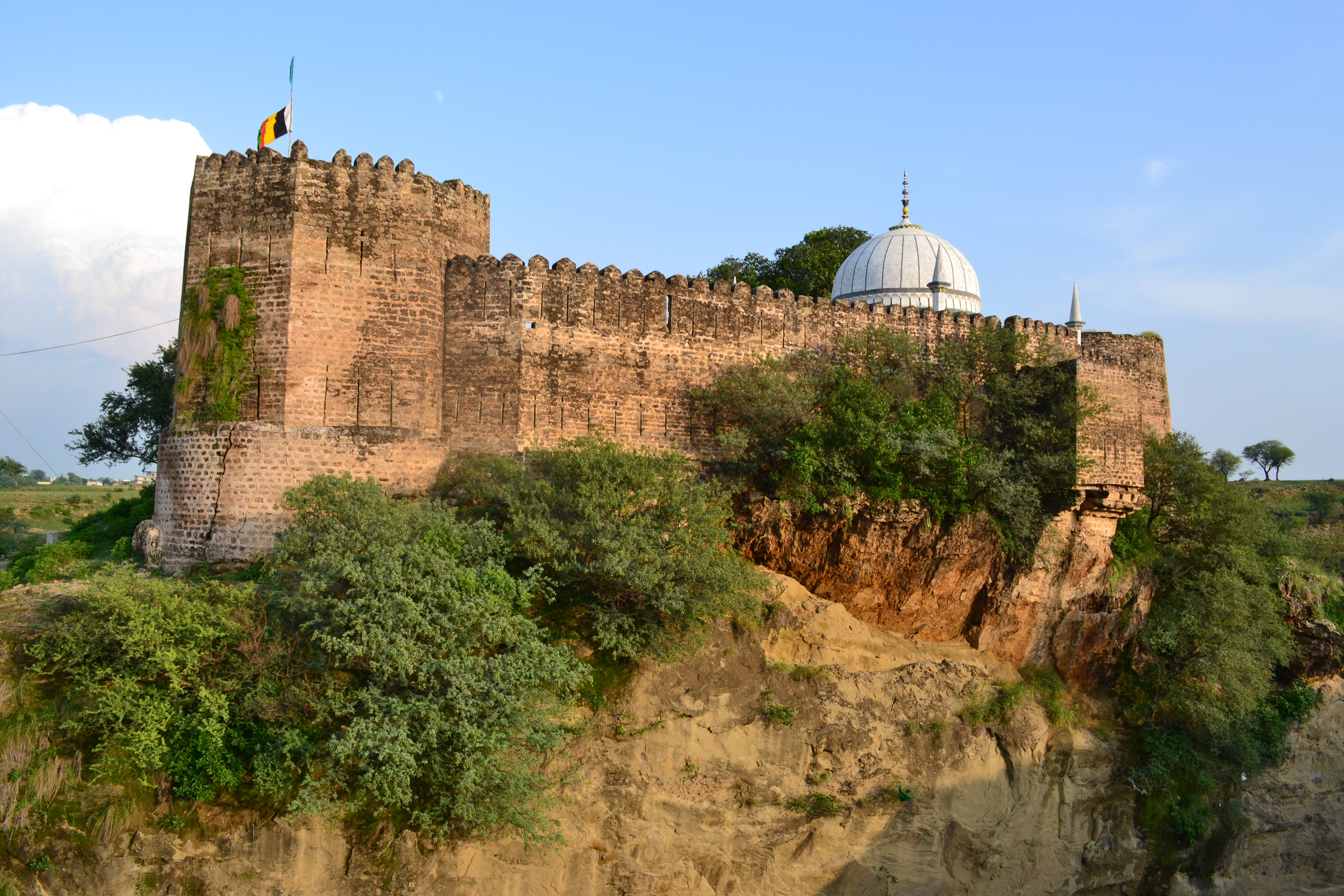
- A view of Sangni Fort

General information
- Location: Kallar Syedan Tehsil, Rawalpindi District, Pakistan
- Completed: 19th century

Sangni Fort (Punjabi: سنگنی قلعہ) is an early 19th century Sikh-era fortress located near the Takal village in Kallar Syedan Tehsil, Rawalpindi District, in Punjab, Pakistan.

== History ==
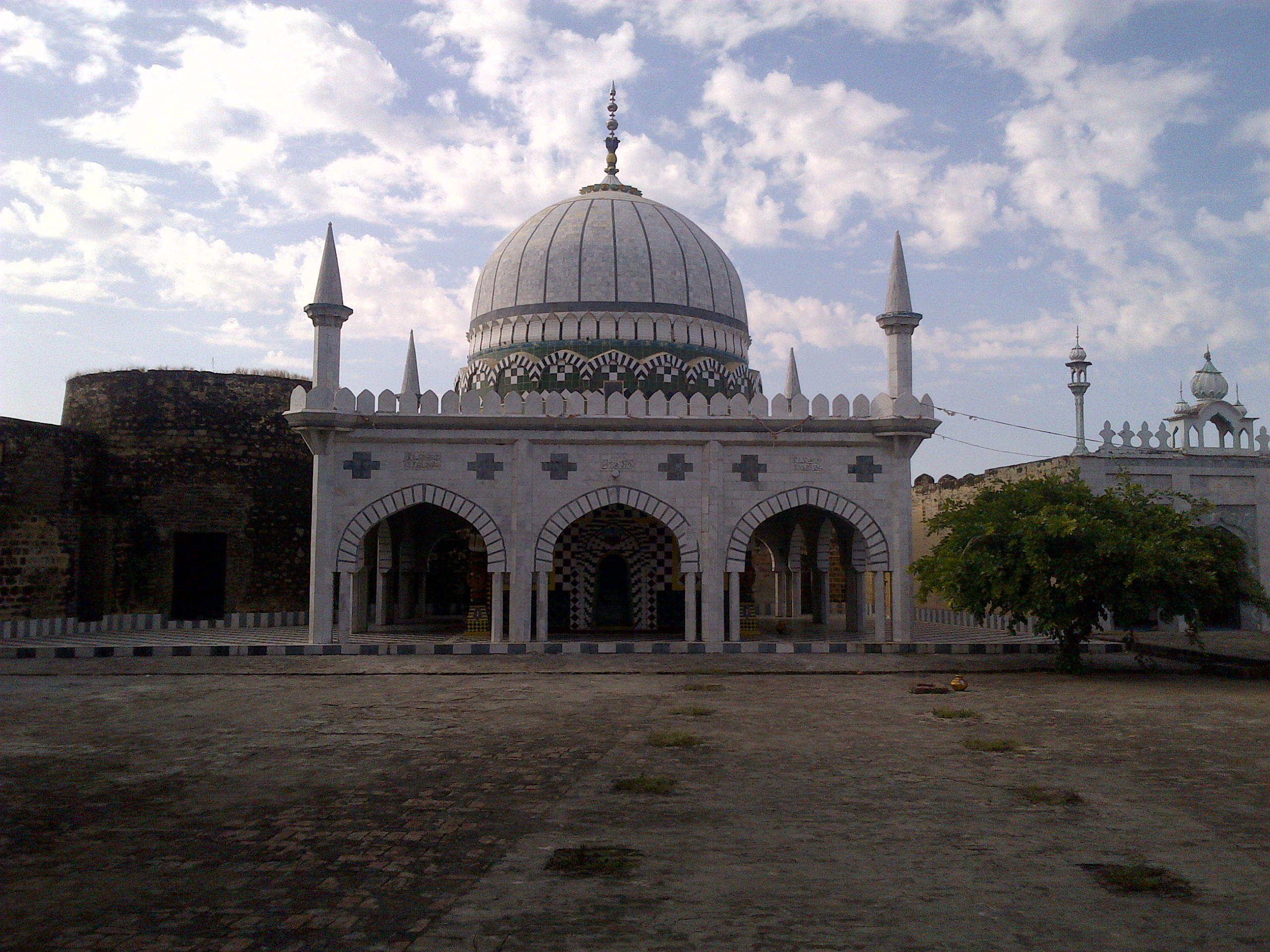
Shrine within the fort

The fort was built in the Sikh Period (1799–1849). This area came under Sandhawalia Jat ruler Maharaja Ranjit Singh in 1814. It was built to control the area and to facilitate tax collection. The British made this area part of Bewal. Gradually the fort lost its importance and became obscure. The keepers of a nearby obscure shrine moved the shrine to this fort.

The fort is in good condition with intact walls but the inside is altered and decorated due to the presence of the shrine of Sahibzada Abdul Hakeem.
