= Kallar Syedan =

Kallar Syedan کلر سیداں
- City
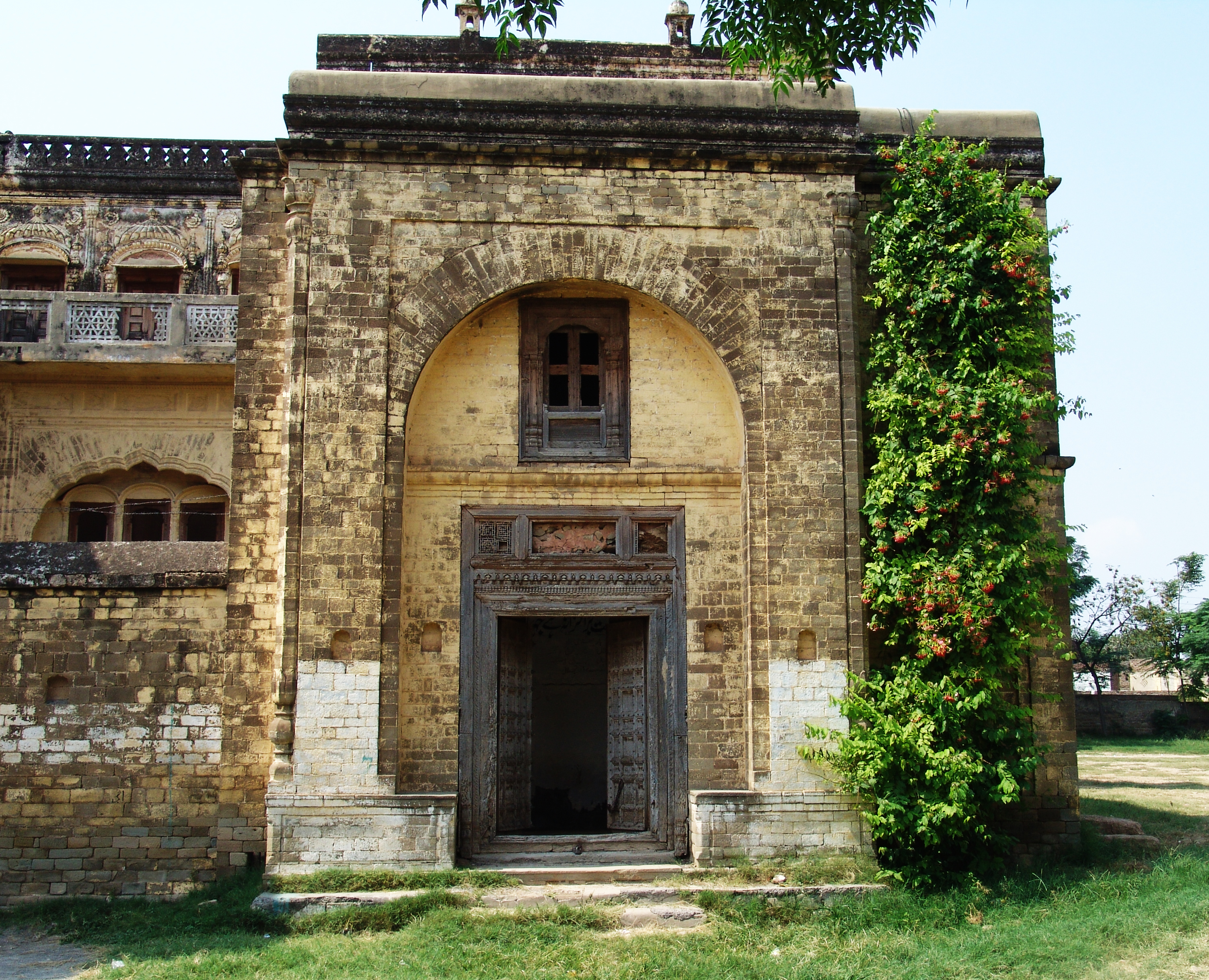
- Bedi Mahal

- Location within Punjab, Pakistan Location within Pakistan
- Coordinates: 33°24′52″N 73°22′43″E
- Country: Pakistan
- Region: Punjab
- District: Rawalpindi District
- Tehsil: Kallar Syedan Tehsil
- Capital City: Kallar Syedan
- Towns: 15
- Union councils: 11
- Elevation: 520 m (1,710 ft)

Population (2023)
  - Total: 60,941
- Time zone: UTC+5 (PST)
- Postal code: 47520
- Area code: 051

Kallar Syedan (Punjabi/Urdu: کلر سیداں) is a city located in Punjab, Pakistan, and is the headquarters of the Kallar Syedan Tehsil.

== History ==
Rawalpindi District Sub Div

Kallar Syedan's existence dates back approximately 1,200 years. Throughout Mughal rule, it remained as a stronghold of the local Gakhars. The town eventually rose to prominence during Sikh rule, evident today from the havelis (townhouses), gurdwaras (temples) and small fortresses which were built during that period (1819-1849). Krishna Temple is an example of a Hindu temple built during British rule.

The settlement is associated with the Bedi family, whom are direct descendants of Guru Nanak. After Sahib Singh Bedi's death in 1834, Bikram Singh succeeded the family estate in Una whilst his brother Bishan Singh succeeded the family estate in Kallar (Rawalpindi). The Bedi Mahal palace was built by Baba Khem Singh Bedi in the latter half of the 19th century. According to records, Baba Khem Singh assisted the British Raj in suppressing a rebellion in Gugera, a town near the Okara district during the 1857 Indian mutiny. In recognition of his services, he was appointed magistrate in 1877 and was later nominated to the Viceroy's Legislative Council in 1893. After the division of India and Pakistan, the palace was transformed into a boy's high school named Kallar Syedan.

== Demographics ==
Population

Historical population
Year	Pop.	±% p.a.
2017	54,239	—
2023	60,941	+1.96%

According to the 2023 census Kallar Syedan had a population of 60,941 inhabitants.

Languages

Languages of Kallar Syedan city (2023 Census)
1. Punjabi (33.7%)
2. Pashto (4.60%)
3. Urdu (2.80%)
4. Others (58.9%)

== Transport ==
=== Road ===
Kallar Syedan is located on the N-38 Kallar Syedan Road from Rawalpindi to Azad Kashmir. Kallar Syedan Road links the east of the city to Choha Khalsa and Dadyal Tehsil of Azad Kashmir. Kallar Syedan Bypass is a newly built road south of the city.

=== Bus and minibus ===
Local services also provide extensive bus and van routes around the local towns, and smaller shuttles travel around the villages in the surrounding area. There are also services to Rawalpindi and Islamabad.

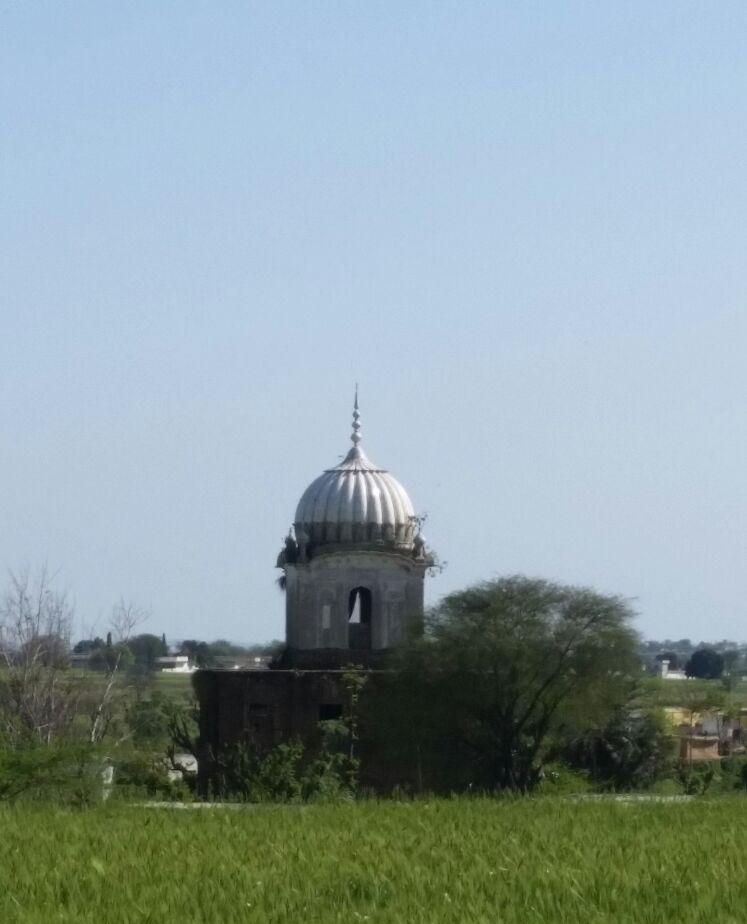
Old Gurdwara Kallar Sayyidan

== Places of interest ==
- Dhamali
- Bedi Mahal
- Sangni Fort
- Pharwala Fort

== Notable people ==
- Tikka Khan
- Abdul Aziz Mirza
- Khem Singh Bedi
- Amir haider khan
