= Choa Khalsa =

Pakistani town

Choa Khalsa چوآ خالصا
- Town
- Interactive map of Choa Khalsa
- Coordinates: 33°24′39″N 73°28′47″E
- Country: Pakistan
- Province: (Punjab, Pakistan) Punjab
- District: Rawalpindi
- Tehsil: Kallar Syedan
- UC: Choa Khalsa

Population (2017 Pakistani census)
  - Total: 97,623
- Time zone: UTC+5 (PST)
  - Summer (DST): UTC+6 (PDT)
- Area code: 051

Choa Khalsa is a town and union council of Kallar Syedan Tehsil, Rawalpindi District, Punjab, Pakistan. Before 2004, this town or village was part of Kahuta Tehsil. The town consists of 800 houses. On 1 July 2004, Choa Khalsa became a union council. This region is also generally called the Pothohar Plateau.

== History ==
The word "choa" means water spring, and Khalsa is related to Sikhism. Khalsa is a strict Sikh religious order founded in 1699 by Guru Gobind Singh. The term "Khalsa" is an Arabic word. There are various interpretations of the term "Khalsa. One general meaning of the term is "free from impurities" or "pure". This term is also defined as the land or estate that belongs directly to the king, without any intermediary claims of lords, nobles, or farmers to the same in the Rawalpindi District. Some villages go by the name of Dera Khalsa, Thoha Khalsa, or Choha Khalsa. They were so named because they were state-owned villages during Sikh rule in the Potohar region of northwestern Punjab.

Choa Khalsa village is located about 60 km from Rawalpindi city.

It was one of the villages affected by the Rawalpindi Massacres of March 1947, where the local paramilitary force of the Muslim League National Guards attacked this village, looted, raped, and forced local Sikh women to convert to Islam. A total of 150 Sikhs were killed This barbaric attack set in motion a mass killing spree throughout the Punjab region. Many Sikh women chose to drown themselves in a well in an act of mass suicide.

== Villages ==
- Choa Khalsa
- Chullo Mirgala
- Dhoke Ch Feroze Khan
- Dhoke Kanyal
- Dhok Dulal Qureshi
- Khanada
- Muhalla Akbari
- Takal
- Mohra Heran
- Dhok Baba Balandiyan
- Dhok Sadiq abad
- Dhoke Gohar wali Takal
- Pirhali
- Rajam
- Dhok Bangyal
- Dhok Sangal
- Khanadah
- Mohalla Akbri
- Sohat Sadra
- Sahot Kalyal
- Sohot Badhal
- Barri Bunn
- Mohra Nagrial
- Dhok Muqaddam
- Ghadur
- Marighala Khalsa
- Mohra Nagrial
- Mohalla Rajgaan
- Mangal Rajgan

== Choa Khalsa Circle Union Councils ==
Choa Khalsa is center of six union councils.

UC number	Union council	Population (2017)
UC24	Nala Musalmana	00,00
UC25	Manyanda	00,00
UC26	Samote	30000 approximately
UC27	Choa Khalsa	00,00
UC28	Kanoha	14000 approximately
UC 29	Doberan Kallan	00,00

After Delimitation 2018, the Choa Khalsa Circle, which includes 6 Union Councils of Kallar Syedan Tehsil comes under NA-58 (Rawalpindi-II), National Assembly.and in PP-7 (Rawalpindi-II) for the Punjab Assembly.

== Notable people ==
- Abdul Aziz Mirza, Chief of Naval Staff, ambassador to Saudi Arabia
