= PP-12 Rawalpindi-VI =

Constituency of the Provincial Assembly of Punjab, Pakistan

- Constituency for the Provincial Assembly of Punjab
- Region: Taxila Tehsil (excluding) Wah Cantt of Rawalpindi District

Current constituency
- Created from: PP-7 Rawalpindi-VII (2002-2018); PP-19 Rawalpindi-XIV (2018-2023)

PP-12 Rawalpindi-VI (پی پی-12، راولپنڈى-6) is a Constituency of Provincial Assembly of Punjab.

== 1985-1988:PP-7 Rawalpindi-VII ==
General elections were held on March 12, 1985.(PP-7 – Rawalpindi) Chaudhary Muhammad Khalid won this seat |-

Contesting candidates	Party affiliation
Chaudhary Muhammad Khalid	Independent

== 1988-1990:PP-7 Rawalpindi-VII ==
General elections were held on November 30, 1988 (PP-7 – Rawalpindi) Chaudhary Muhammad Khalid won this seat

Contesting candidates	Party affiliation
Chaudhary Muhammad Khalid	PPP

== 1990-1993:PP-7 Rawalpindi-VII ==
General elections were held on November 5, 1990 (PP-7 – Rawalpindi) Shaukat Mahmood Bhatti won this seat

Contesting candidates	Party affiliation
Shaukat Mahmood Bhatti	IJI

== 1993-1997:PP-7 Rawalpindi-VII ==
General elections were held on November 30, 1993 (PP-7 – Rawalpindi) Chaudhary Muhammad Khalid won this seat

Contesting candidates	Party affiliation
Chaudhary Muhammad Khalid	PPP

== 1997-2002:PP-7 Rawalpindi-VII ==
General elections were held on February 18, 1997 (PP-7 – Rawalpindi) Shaukat Mahmood Bhatti won this seat

Contesting candidates	Party affiliation
Shaukat Mahmood Bhatti	PML-N

== 2002-2008:PP-7 Rawalpindi-VII ==
General elections were held on November 25, 2002.

== 2008-2013:PP-7 Rawalpindi-VII ==
Provincial election 2008: PP-7 Rawalpindi-VII
Party	Candidate	Votes	%	±%
PML(Q)	Muhammad Shafiq Khan	30,718	32.29	
PML(N)	Mrs. Umar Farooq	29,458	30.97	
Independent	Ch. Muhammad Kamran Ali Khan	19,918	20.94	
PPP	Askari Hassan Syed	12,550	13.19	
MMA	Hafiz Muhammad Haroon	2,293	2.41	
Independent	Malik Muhamad Khalid Advocate	187	0.20	
Turnout		98,209	58.57	
Total valid votes		95,124	96.86	
Rejected ballots		3,085	3.14	
Majority		1,260	1.32	
Registered electors		167,688		

== 2013:PP-7 Rawalpindi-VII ==
General elections were held on 11 May 2013. Muhammad Siddique Khan won this seat with 48,440 votes.

Provincial election 2013 : PP-7 Rawalpindi-VII
Party	Candidate	Votes	%	±%
PTI	Muhammad Siddique Khan	48,440	41.45	
Independent	Chaudhary Nisar Ali Khan	47,666	40.78	
PPP	Chaudhary Muhammad Kamran Ali Khan	14,529	12.43	
JI	Ateeq Ur Rehman	1,620	1.39	
JUI (F)	Hafiz Muhammad Haroon	1,490	1.28	
Independent	Chaudhary Waqar Ali Khan	1,280	1.10	
Others	Others (six candidates)	1,851	1.57	
Turnout		119,357	67.51	
Total valid votes		116,876	97.92	
Rejected ballots		2,481	2.08	
Majority		774	0.67	
Registered electors		176,793		
hold				

== 2018—2023 PP-19 Rawalpindi-XIV ==
From 2018 PP-7 Rawalpindi-VII became PP-19 Rawalpindi-XIV with some changes has follow (a) Taxila Tehsil excluding Wah Cantonment and (b) Adyala Qanungo Halqa of Rawalpindi Tehsil of Rawalpindi District.

General elections are scheduled to be held on 25 July 2018.

Provincial election 2018: PP-19 Rawalpindi-XIV
Party	Candidate	Votes	%	±%
PTI	Ammar Saddique Khan	59,568	50.23	
Independent	Malik Umer Farooq	30,424	25.66	
PML(N)	Zeeshan Siddique Butt	17,934	15.12	
TLP	Qurban Ali	5,149	4.34	
MMA	Safeer Alim	2,711	2.29	
PPP	Raja Sajid Umer	1,756	1.48	
Others	Others (three candidates)	1,043	0.88	
Turnout		122,079	63.46	
Total valid votes		118,585	97.14	
Rejected ballots		3,494	2.86	
Majority		29,144	24.57	
Registered electors		192,382		
hold				

== General elections 2024 ==
Provincial election 2024: PP-12 Rawalpindi-VI
Party	Candidate	Votes	%	±%
PML(N)	Mohsin Ayub Khan	41,276	35.46	
Independent	Saad Ali Khan (Note: Filed nomination papers as PTI candidate but ECP allowed him to run as an Independent)	35,118	30.17	
IPP	Ammar Siddique Khan	12,399	10.65	
Independent	Zeeshan Siddique Butt	9,720	8.35	
TLP	Nayyar Jovad Raja	6,819	5.86	
Independent	Muhammad Irshad	3,043	2.61	
JI	Aitique Ur Rehman Kashmin	2,189	1.88	
Others	Others (twenty three candidates)	5,832	5.02	
Turnout		119,794	53.81	
Total valid votes		116,396	97.16	
Rejected ballots		3,398	2.84	
Majority		6,158	5.29	
Registered electors		222,641		
hold				

== See also ==
- PP-11 Rawalpindi-V
- PP-13 Rawalpindi-VII
