= Khosa caretaker government =

Caretaker cabinet of Pakistan in 2013

Khosa Caretaker Government
- 44th Cabinet of Pakistan
- Date formed: 2 April 2013
- Date dissolved: 7 June 2013

People and organisations
- Head of state: Asif Ali Zardari
- Head of government: Mir Hazar Khan Khosa
- Status in legislature: Caretaker government

History
- Predecessor: Ashraf government
- Successor: Third Nawaz Sharif ministry

The Khoso caretaker government was the Pakistani caretaker federal cabinet that was sworn into office on 2 April 2013. On 24 March 2013, Mir Hazar Khan Khosa was nominated by the Election Commission as the Caretaker Prime minister, out of four nominees coming from both the opposition and the dissolved government. Khoso was sworn into office on 25 March 2013.

== Cabinet ==
=== 2013 ===
Khosa's cabinet was sworn into office on 2 April 2013, but were handed their official portfolios on 4 April 2013 with the exception of Sohail Wajahat Siddique, who received his portfolio at a later date.

At the swearing-in ceremony on 2 April 2013, 15 ministers were shortlisted for the cabinet but one chair was removed at the "eleventh hour". Dr Mushtaq Khan from Sindh was touted to become the caretaker federal minister of finance but dropped out at the last minute. Speculations around his absence suggested that Khan was stopped from taking his oath because he had been serving as the chief economist at the State Bank of Pakistan (SBP) and would have had to resign from the SBP before taking an oath in the caretaker setup.

Ministry	Minister
Punjab
Ministry of Interior and Narcotics Control	Malik Habib
Ministry of Law, Justice, Parliamentary Affairs and Human Rights	Ahmer Bilal Soofi
Ministry of Water and Power	Musadik Malik
Ministry of Information and Postal Service	Arif Nizami
Ministry for Industries and Production	Shahzada Ahsan Ashraf
Ministry of Religious and National Harmony	Shahzada Jamal Nazir
Sindh
Ministry of Petroleum and Natural Resources	Sohail Wajahat H. Siddiqui
Ministry of Textiles and Commerce	Maqbool HH Rahimtoola
Ministry of Housing and Works	Younus Soomro
Balochistan
Ministry of Railways	Abdul Malik Kasi
Minister for Ports and Shipping and Communication	Asadullah Mandokhel
Ministry of National Food Security and Research	Mir Hassan Domki
Khyber Pakhtunkhwa
Ministry of Science and Technology, IT, Professional Training and Education	Dr Sania Nishtar
Ministry of Overseas Pakistanis and Human Resource Development	Feroze Jamal Shah Kakakhel
