= Iftikhar Ali Khan (general) =

Pakistani general and politician (1940–2009)

Lieutenant General Iftikhar Ali Khan HI(M) Sbt
- Born: 5 January 1941; Chakri, Punjab, British India, (now Pakistan)
- Died: 22 August 2009 (aged 68); Rawalpindi, Punjab, Pakistan
- Education: Cadet College Hasan Abdal; Pakistan Military Academy
- Relatives: Chaudhary Nisar Ali Khan (brother)
- Military career
- Allegiance: Pakistan
- Branch: Pakistan Army
- Service years: 1962 – 1997
- Rank: Lieutenant General
- Units: 11 Baloch Regiment; 28 Baloch Regiment; 5 Azad Kashmir Regiment
- Commands: Chief Instructor AFWC at NDC; President National Defence College; Commander XXXI Corps; Chief of General Staff (CGS)
- Conflicts: Indo-Pakistani War of 1965; Indo-Pakistani War of 1971
- Awards: Hilal-i-Imtiaz (Military); Sitara-e-Basalat
- Other work: Defence Secretary of Pakistan

Iftikhar Ali Khan (Urdu: افتخار علی خان), HI(M) SBt (5 January 1941 – 22 August 2009) was a three-star rank army general of the Pakistan Army. He was the former Secretary of Defense and a Chief of General Staff (CGS) of the Pakistan Army.

== Early life ==
Khan was born in a family of Jodhra and Alpial tribes of Rajput on 5 January 1941 to Brigadier (retired) Fateh Khan in Chakri village, Rawalpindi District.

== Personal life ==
He was the older brother of Chaudhary Nisar Ali Khan.

== Military career ==
Iftikhar Ali Khan was commissioned in the Pakistan Army in October 1961 in the 26th PMA Long Course. Khan served as the Chief Instructor of the Armed Forces War College at National Defence College, Rawalpindi from April 1991 to May 1993. He was promoted to Lieutenant General in May 1993 and did a brief stint as Commandant at the National Defence College, Rawalpindi until June 1993. He was later appointed Commander XXXI Corps, Bahawalpur, a post he held for two and a half years.

== Death ==
He died on 22 August 2009 from a heart attack. He was buried on 23 August 2009 in his ancestral graveyard in Chakri and his funeral prayers were attended by politicians, senior army officials, and religious scholars.

Military offices
| Preceded by Jehangir Karamat | Chief of General Staff; 1996 – 1997 | Succeeded by Ali Kuli Khan Khattak |
