= Jairo Ratial =

- Village
- Location within Punjab, Pakistan Location within Pakistan
- Coordinates: 33.178993°N 73.297949°E
- Country: Pakistan
- Province: Punjab
- District: Rawalpindi
- Tehsil: Gujar Khan
- Postal code: 47981

Jairo Ratial (جیرورتیال) is a village situated on the outskirts of Gujar Khan of Rawalpindi District, Punjab. Jairo Ratial is the chief village of the Union Council Jairo Ratial which is an administrative subdivision of the Tehsil. It is also within the Pothwari cultural region. It is one of the largest villages under Gujar Khan Tehsil and is also one of the important union councils of Gujar Khan (Jairo Ratial became a Union Council in 2015). It is approximately 62 km southeast to the capital territory of Pakistan, Islamabad, and 215 km to the north west of Lahore, capital of Punjab. On the northern side, Jairo Ratial is bounded by Dudian, Gulyana, and Gujar Khan city. On the Western side, Cheena, Sasral, Daultala, Chakwal are situated. On the Eastern side, Mayhall, Missa Kaswal, Mirpur Azad Kashmir are present and lastly, on the Western side, Daryala Khaki, Khengar Mamdal, Muhri Rajgan, and Domeli are situated. The town has a population of about 15,000. Jairo Ratial lies at the bank of the Kass, a small river.

== Notable people ==
- Raja Pervaiz Ashraf - a Pakistani businessman, farmer and politician who served as the 19th Prime Minister of Pakistan from June 2012 until March 2013.
- Muhammad Javed Ikhlas - born 5 October 1955 is a Pakistani politician who had been a member of the National Assembly of Pakistan. He previously was a member of the Provincial Assembly of Punjab from 1985 to 1999

== Occupation ==
80% of the population depends on agriculture. Lands of the area are very fertile and arable. Important crops include wheat, millet, peanuts and other pulses.

== Languages ==
Pathwari(پوٹھوهاری (Shahmukhi); also known as Potohari پوٹھواری) is the main language of Jairo Ratial. Urdu is also becoming a popular language as people try to speak with their school going children.

== Transport ==
There is a local private public transport service which runs from the village to the city of Gujar Khan. Some people use Rikshaw as a local public transport. Taxi service is also available.

== Mosque ==
There are four Mosques in the village, two of them are the grand mosques (جامع مساجد).

== Education ==
- Govt Primary School for boys Jairo Ratial
- Govt High School for boys Jairo Ratial
- Govt Middle School for girls Jairo Ratial

== Shrine ==
Jairo Ratial also holds the shrine of Hazrat Mian Muhammad Saee Sahib, where every year people come to celebrate a 'mela' (a gathering) in his remembrance. The current successor of Hazrat Mian Muhammad Saee Sahib is Mian Muhammad Zafaryab Ahmad Sahib.

== Health care ==
There is no Hospital in the village so people have to go to the nearby city of Gujar Khan for the health issues. The only medical facility immediately available for the villagers is first aid.

== Sports ==
Games which boys often play are Cricket and Football. Girls play indoor games only.
