= Chaudhary Nisar Ali Khan =

Pakistani politician

- چوہدری نثار علی خان
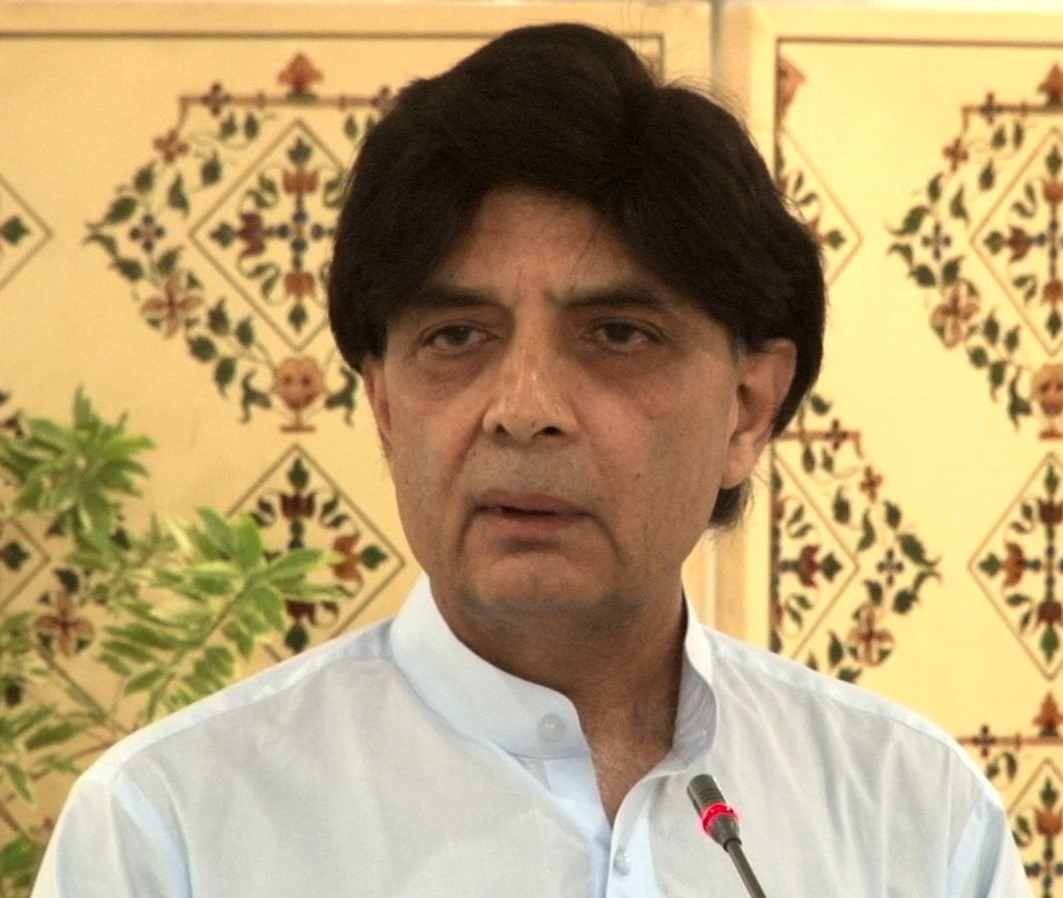

Minister for Interior
- In office 7 June 2013 – 28 July 2017
- President: Mamnoon Hussain
- Prime Minister: Nawaz Sharif
- Preceded by: Malik Habib
- Succeeded by: Ahsan Iqbal

Leader of Opposition
- In office 17 September 2008 – 7 June 2013
- President: Asif Ali Zardari
- Prime Minister: Yusuf Raza Gillani
- Preceded by: Parvez Elahi
- Succeeded by: Khurshid Shah

Minister for National Food Security & Research
- In office 31 March 2008 – 13 May 2008
- Prime Minister: Yusuf Raza Gillani
- Preceded by: Sikandar Hayat Khan Bosan
- Succeeded by: Nazar Muhammad Gondal

Minister for Communications
- In office 29 March 2008 – 13 May 2008
- President: Pervez Musharraf
- Prime Minister: Yusuf Raza Gillani
- Preceded by: Muhammad Shamim Siddiqui

Minister for Inter Provincial Coordination
- In office 1997–1999
- President: Wasim Sajjad; Muhammad Rafiq Tarar
- Prime Minister: Nawaz Sharif

Minister for Petroleum and Natural Resources
- In office 1997–1999
- President: Wasim Sajjad; Muhammad Rafiq Tarar
- Prime Minister: Nawaz Sharif
- In office 1990–1993
- President: Ghulam Ishaq Khan
- Prime Minister: Nawaz Sharif

Minister for Science and Technology
- In office June 1988 – December 1988
- Preceded by: Malik Naeem Khan Awan
- Succeeded by: Jehangir Bader

Member of the National Assembly of Pakistan
- In office 15 November 2002 – 31 May 2018
- Constituency: NA-52 Rawalpindi
- In office 1985 – 12 October 1999
- Constituency: NA-52 Rawalpindi

Personal details
- Born: Chakri, Punjab, Pakistan, Pakistan
- Party: IND
- Other political affiliations: PMLN (1997-2017); IJI (1980-1997)
- Relatives: Iftikhar Ali Khan (brother)
- Education: Burn Hall College (BA)

Chaudhary Nisar Ali Khan (Note: Urdu: چوہدری نِثار علی خان) (born 31 July 1954) is a Pakistani politician who served as the Interior Minister from 2013 to 2017 under the third Sharif administration. A senior conservative thinker formerly on a platform on the Pakistan Muslim League (N), Khan had been a member of the National Assembly of Pakistan between 1985 and May 2018. He was the Leader of the Opposition in the National Assembly from 2008 to 2013.

Born in Chakri, Khan was educated at the Burn Hall College. Khan has served in various federal cabinet positions since 1988, mostly under the Sharif's administrations. Under the first Sharif administration in 1990, he served as the Minister of Science and Technology; and on second Sharif administration in 1997, he held the cabinet portfolio of Minister of Petroleum and Natural Resources. For a short stint, he served in the Gillani administration, he briefly served as the Minister of Food Security and Research with the additional portfolio of Communications Minister. In 2013, he joined the third Sharif administration, he was appointed as the Interior Minister, which he held until the dissolution of the federal cabinet in July 2017 following the dismissal of Sharif by the Supreme Court of Pakistan.

After unsuccessfully defended his constituency for the National Assembly, Khan ran for the provincial seat and had been a member of the Provincial Assembly of the Punjab from August 2018 till January 2023.

== Early life and education ==
Khan was born in the Chakri, Rawalpindi District, on 31 July 1954. His family roots traced to the Jodhra and Alpial tribes of the Rajputs. Khan hailed from a military family who served in the former British Indian Army; his father, Fateh Khan, was a Brigadier in the Pakistan Army. His great-great-grandfather Sher Khan served in the British Army who assisted the British Empire during the Indian rebellion of 1857; his grandfather Chaudhary Sultan Khan was an officer in the British Indian Army and died during World War I.

His elder brother, Iftikhar Ali Khan, was a three-star general who served as the Chief of the General Staff.

Khan was educated and graduated from the Aitchison College in Lahore and later went to attend the Burn Hall College in Abbottabad for his college studies. During his time at Aitchison, he played batting and captained its cricket team, and Imran Khan playing under his captaincy.

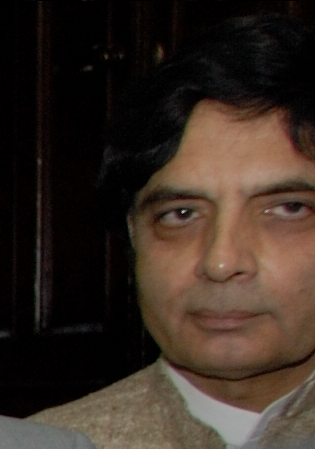
Nisar Ali Khan in United States.

== Political career ==
=== Early career ===
Khan began his political career in the 1980s after becoming chairman of Rawalpindi district council. He became close to Nawaz Sharif during the rule of Muhammad Zia-ul-Haq.

=== 1985–1993 ===
He was first elected to the National Assembly in the 1985 general election from constituency NA-52 (Rawalpindi-III). He was re-elected to the National Assembly from the same constituency in the 1988 general election on the Islami Jamhoori Ittehad ticket. He was then appointed as the Federal Minister for Science and Technology. After getting re-elected for the third time to the National Assembly in the 1990 general election on the Islami Jamhoori Ittehad ticket from constituency NA-52 (Rawalpindi-III), Khan was made the Federal Minister for Petroleum and Natural Resources and Provincial Coordinator, where he served from 1990 to 1993 during the first government of Sharif. He was re-elected to the national assembly for the fourth time in the 1993 general election from constituency NA-52 (Rawalpindi-III).

In April 1993, the widow of Chief of Army Staff General Asif Nawaz Janjua, alleged that Brigadier Imtiaz, head of the Intelligence Bureau, Nawaz Sharif, Shehbaz Sharif, and Chaudhary Nisar Ali Khan had planned to eliminate her husband.

=== 1993–2002 ===
He was re-elected to the National Assembly for the fifth time in the 1997 general election from constituency NA-52 (Rawalpindi-III) and was for the second time appointed as the Federal Minister for Petroleum and Natural Resources, where he served until he was dismissed in October 1999 after the coup d'état when then Chief of Army Staff, Pervez Musharraf, overthrew the elected government of Sharif. Khan was placed under house arrest for many weeks. It was during his tenure as Member of the National Assembly, he became the most powerful man in PML-N after Nawaz Sharif. Khan was also among Sharif's loyalists who kept the PML-N alive during the Musharraf rule. Musharraf was reportedly appointed as the Chief of Army Staff on the recommendation of Khan.

Khan was re-elected to the National Assembly for the sixth time in the 2002 general election from constituency NA-52 (Rawalpindi-III). However, he lost the election in constituency NA-53 (Rawalpindi-IV).

=== 2002–2011 ===
He was re-elected as a member of the National Assembly in the 2008 general election for the seventh time, both from constituency NA-52 (Rawalpindi-III) and from constituency NA-53 (Rawalpindi-IV). Later, Khan vacated the NA-52 seat and retained NA-53.

Khan was appointed the Federal Minister for Food, Agriculture and Livestock and Federal Minister for Communications in March 2008 in the government of Yousaf Raza Gillani, but his tenure was short-lived due to PML-N's decision to leave the Pakistan Peoples Party-led coalition government.

In September 2008, he was appointed the Leader of the Opposition in the National Assembly after the resignation of Chaudhry Pervaiz Elahi. In October 2011, he became the first-ever chairperson of the Public Accounts Committee of the National Assembly (which was created to audit the accounts of the government) to present annual reports, but he resigned in November 2011 claiming that accountability was not possible under the Pakistan Peoples Party regime led by President Asif Ali Zardari and Prime Minister Gilani.

=== 2013–2017 ===
For the 2013 general election, Khan was made part of PML-N's central parliamentary board tasked with selecting candidates for the election. Khan was re-elected to the National Assembly from constituency NA-52 (Rawalpindi-III) for the eighth time in the election and was appointed the Federal Minister for Interior and Narcotics Control in the Sharif cabinet, as he had a close relationship with the Pakistan Armed Forces.

In 2013, Dawn reported that, although Khan had no post in PML-N, he was known for his assertiveness in the party's affairs and had had differences with other PML-N leaders. Reportedly, before the 2013 election, Khan lobbied to become the Chief Minister of Punjab, Pakistan, and proposed that Shehbaz Sharif be made Minister for Water and Power, but Nawaz Sharif did not give the party ticket to Khan for the provincial seat. In spite of that, Khan contested the election for provincial assembly seat as an independent candidate and won. Dawn reported that Khan was once considered the de facto chief minister of Punjab.

In March 2015, The News International commended the 21-month progress of Khan as Interior Minister. However, Khan was held responsible for failing to implement and enforce the proposals and plans of the National Action Plan. Khan was also criticised for delaying the inauguration of the Safe City Project in Islamabad, under which 1,800 surveillance cameras were installed across the city. During his tenure as Interior Minister, he issued the approval to launch Biometric passport in Pakistan.

=== 2017–present ===
He ceased to hold ministerial office on 28 July 2017 when the federal cabinet was disbanded following the resignation of Sharif after the Panama Papers case decision. A day earlier, Khan had announced that he was considering stepping down as Interior Minister and resigning from membership in the National Assembly because of his differences with the party leaders. After the resignation of Sharif, Khan held a farewell meeting with his Interior Ministry staff and made it clear that he would not become part of the next federal cabinet of the incoming prime minister Shahid Khaqan Abbasi, who is junior to him. As of September 2017, Khan was the longest continuously-serving member of the National Assembly, who was elected to the National Assembly eight times since 1985 election. On 4 August 2017, Abbasi announced his cabinet without Khan being a member. However, reportedly Khan did not renounce his seat in the National Assembly. Khan was accused for giving safe passage to Pervez Musharraf for going out of Pakistan despite a treason case against him.

In February 2018, Imran Khan offered Khan to join Pakistan Tehreek-e-Insaf before 2018 general election. On 27 February, it was reported Nawaz Sharif has parted ways with Khan.

In June 2018, he parted ways with PML-N and announced to run for the 2018 general election as an independent candidate instead of seeking the nomination of PML-N and criticized Sharif brothers saying "These Sharifs will not able to show their faces anywhere if I decide to open my mouth." In July 2018, he in a press conference said "My decision to run as an independent candidate does not mean I have parted ways with the PML-N".

He was re-elected to the Provincial Assembly of the Punjab as an independent candidate from Constituency PP-10 (Rawalpindi-V) in the 2018 general election. He received 53,212 votes and defeated Naseer UI Husnain Shah a Independent politician. In the same election, he also ran for the seat in the National Assembly as an independent candidate from Constituency NA-59 (Rawalpindi-III) and Constituency NA-63 (Rawalpindi-VII), but was unsuccessful. Following the election, he went outside Pakistan and did not take oath of the provincial assembly seat.

In January 2019, a petition was filed in the Lahore High Court against Khan which directed the Election Commission of Pakistan to de-notify him for his failure to take oath as member of the Punjab Assembly.

== Ministries ==
=== Minister of Science and Technology (1988) ===
He was appointed the Minister of Science and Technology for the first time as the ministers for a very short time of 6 months from June 1988 to December 1988, under Muhammad Zia-ul-Haq. He was preceded by Malik Naeem Khan Awan and at that time he was Member of National Assembly on the ticket of Islami Jamhoori Ittehad from NA-54 (Rawalpindi-III). Nishar resigned from the ministry after Pakistan Peoples Party won the election and Benazir Bhutto became the Prime Minister of Pakistan. He was not able to make any reforms as a Minister because of a short period of just 6 months and he passed his ministry to Jehangir Bader.

=== Minister of Petroleum and Natural Resources (1990–1993) ===
After getting re-elected for the third time to the National Assembly in the 1990 general election on the Islami Jamhoori Ittehad ticket from constituency NA-52 (Rawalpindi-III), Khan was made the Federal Minister for Petroleum and Natural Resources and Provincial Coordinator, where he served from 1990 to 1993 during the first government of Sharif. At that time the president was Ghulam Ishaq Khan and he was also a close aide of him. At that time Sharif survived a serious constitutional crisis when President Khan attempted to dismiss him under article 58-2b, in April 1993, but he successfully challenged the decision in the Supreme Court. Sharif resigned from the post, after which all ministers were resigned and Nishar was also removed for the second time from his ministry without completing his whole term.

=== Minister of Provincial Coordination (1997–1999) ===
He was sworn in as the Minister of Provincial Co-ordination in the year 1997 on 17 February after Nawaz Sharif elected as the Prime Minister of Pakistan for the Second time and remained till 12 October 1999 after General Musharaff imposed Martial law in the country.

=== Minister of Petroleum and Natural Resources (1997–1999) ===
He was sworn in as Minister of Petroleum and Natural Resources for the second time along with Minister of Provincial Coordination.

=== Ministries under Yousaf Raza (2008) ===
Nisar was appointed at position of 3 Ministries under Yousaf Raza Gillani, when he was the face of PML (N) in 2008 Pakistani general election and remained for a short period of 2 months (from 31 May 2008 - 14 March 2008) as the party was in alliance with Pakistan Peoples Party, and at that time Nisar openly blamed Pervez Musharraf and PML (Q) over weak Law and Order. He was assigned 3 ministries:

- Minister of Communications
- Minister of Livestock, Agriculture and Animal Husbandry
- Minister of Food Security and Research

=== Minister of Narcotics Control and Interiors ===
Nisar was appointed as the 34th Minister of Narcotics Control and Minister of Interior under the Third Nawaz Sharif Ministry in the year 2013, when Pakistan Muslim League (N) made the government in 2013 Pakistani general election. Nisar who was Leader of Opposition from 2008 to 2013 was appointed the Minister and sworn in for the position on 11 May 2013. He was preceded by Malik Habib and remained in the office for 4 years till 2017, after when Nawaz Sharif resigned from the position of Prime Minister due to Corruption charges and the government fell down.

== Political views ==
=== "Potohari group" ===
Khan, apart from being close to the Pakistan Army due to his family background, has also been considered as the head of the so-called "Potohari group", a section of the PML-N that is considered closer to Shehbaz Sharif, as opposed to the "Lahori group" consisting of the traditional leadership of the party and perceived to be closer to the elder brother Nawaz Sharif.

=== Stance on policy issues with the United States ===
Despite being perceived as conservative but an anti-American, a contradictory version of Khan's political views surfaced in a leaked American diplomatic cable in 2011. The cable, which was sent by the former United States Ambassador to Pakistan, Anne W. Patterson, in September 2008 reads: "As always, Nisar insisted that he and the PML-N were pro-American (saying that his wife and children in fact are Americans)." Khan clarified that he was not against the American nation, but was opposing the U.S. policy towards Islam and Muslims after the 9/11 attacks.

== Offices held ==
S No	Office	Period	Reference
1.	Minister of Science and Technology	June 1988 – December 1988	
2.	Minister of Petroleum and Natural Resources	1990–1993	
3.	Minister of Provincial Co-ordination	1997–1999	
4.	Minister of Petroleum and Natural Resources	1997–1999	
5.	Minister of Communications	March 2008 – May 2008	
6.	Minister of Livestock, Agriculture and Animal Husbandry	March 2008 – May 2008	
6.	Minister of Food Security and Research	March 2008 – May 2008	
7.	Leader of Opposition	September 2008 – June 2013	
8.	Minister of Interiors and Narcotics Control	June 2013 – July 2017	

== Notes ==
Preceded by Malik Naeem Khan Awan	Minister for Science and Technology; 1988–1988	Succeeded by Jehangir Bader
Unknown	Minister for Petroleum and Natural Resources; 1990–1993	Unknown
Unknown	Minister for Inter Provincial Coordination ? – 1999	Unknown
Unknown	Minister for Petroleum and Natural Resources; 1997–1999	Unknown
Preceded by Sikandar Hayat Khan Bosan	Minister for National Food Security & Research; 2008–2008	Unknown
Preceded by Chaudhry Pervaiz Elahi	Leader of the Opposition in the National Assembly; 2008–2013	Succeeded by Syed Khurshid Ahmed Shah
Preceded by Malik Habib	Minister for Interior and Narcotics Control; 2013–2017	Succeeded by Ahsan Iqbal
