= Bara, Khyber Pakhtunkhwa =

Town in Khyber Pakhtunkhwa, Pakistan

Bara باړه
- City
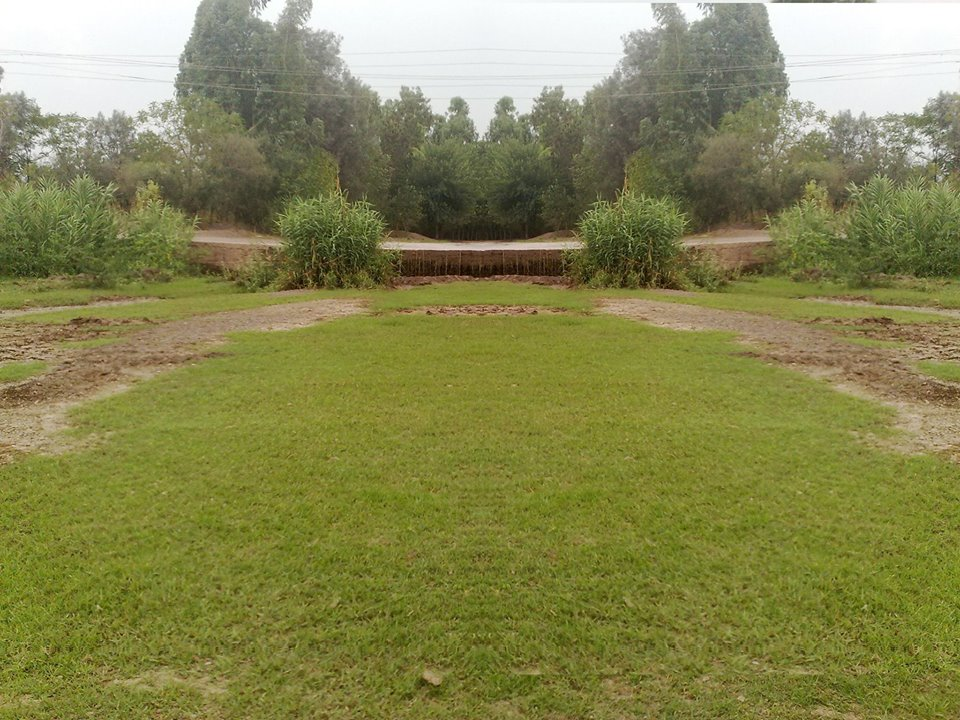
- Logo of Bara Khyber

- Country: Pakistan
- District: Khyber
- Tehsil: Bara
- Established: 1873

Government
  - Type: Tehsil-council
  - Chairman: Muhammad Kafeel (JUI-F)
- Time zone: UTC+05:00 (Pakistan Standard Time)
- Postal Code: 24801
- Main language(s): Pashto

Bara (Pashto: باړه; Urdu: باڑہ) is a town located in Bara Tehsil in the Khyber District of Khyber Pakhtunkhwa province, Pakistan. Kohat is located to the south while Peshawar is located to the north of Bara.

== Overview ==
Bara is also the name of the local administrative division of Bara Tehsil in the Khyber Agency within the Khyber Pakhtunkhwa of Pakistan, of which Bara Town is the administrative seat. The Bara River flows through the town. The town has a fort built by British Raj and supplied water to Peshawar. The town is ethnically Pashtuns, and has been the site of increasing militancy by Lashkar-e-Islam against the central government.

== Location ==
The approximate location is 33° 55′ N latitude, 71° 27′ longitude. The mud fort is visible on Google Earth at 33° 54' 53" by 71° 28' 05", lying alongside a water tank and the Bara River which eventually flows to the East of Peshawar.

== Incidents ==
- 2023 Bara explosion

== Notable people ==
- Javed Afridi, Pakistani Business executive and entrepreneur best known as the CEO of Haier Pakistan.
- Shahid Afridi, Pakistani international cricketer and the former captain of the Pakistan national cricket team.
- Ayub Afridi (drug lord), Pakistani politician and drug smuggler.
- Ayub Afridi (politician), Pakistani politician who has been a Member of the Senate of Pakistan since March 2018.
- Shams Afridi, Finance Manager at Peshawar Zalmi & Haier Pakistan.
- Zarif Khan, Pashtun American restaurant owner and investor.
- Rehmat Shah Afridi, opened the first English newspaper established from KPK
- Khyal Mat Shah, senior journalist, ex president of Bara Press Club.
