= NA-52 Rawalpindi-I =

Constituency of the National Assembly of Pakistan

- Constituency for the National Assembly of Pakistan
- Region: Gujar Khan Tehsil of Rawalpindi District
- Electorate: 629,386

Current constituency
- Created: 1970 (as NW-27 Rawalpindi-II)
- Party: Pakistan People's Party
- Member: Raja Pervaiz Ashraf

NA-52 Rawalpindi-II (این اے-52، راولپنڈی-۲) is a constituency for the National Assembly of Pakistan.

== Area ==
- Gujar Khan Tehsil
- Sagri Qunungo Halqa of Rawalpindi Tehsil (including Mughal)

== Members of Parliament ==
=== 1970–1977: NW-27 Rawalpindi-II ===
Election	Member	Party
1970	Malik Muhammad Jafar	PPP

=== 1977–2002: NA-37 Rawalpindi-II ===
Election	Member	Party
1977	Raja Abdul Aziz Bhatti	PPP
1985	Malik Mehboob Hussain	Independent
1988	Raja Muhammad Zaheer Khan	IJI
1990	Raja Muhammad Zaheer Khan	IJI
1993	Chaudhry Muhammad Riaz	PML-N
1993 by-election	Raja Nadir Pervez Khan	PML-N

=== 2002–2008: NA-51 Rawalpindi-II ===
Election	Member	Party
2002	Raja Pervaiz Ashraf	PPPP
2008	Raja Pervaiz Ashraf	PPPP
2013	Muhammad Javed Ikhlas	PML-N

=== 2018–2023: NA-58 Rawalpindi-II ===
Election	Member	Party
2018	Raja Pervaiz Ashraf	PPPP

=== 2024–present: NA-52 Rawalpindi-II ===
Election	Member	Party
2024	Raja Pervaiz Ashraf	PPPP

== Detailed results ==
=== Election 2002 ===
General elections were held on 10 October 2002. Raja Pervaiz Ashraf of PPPP won by 81,761 votes.

General election 2002: NA-51 Rawalpindi-II
Party	Candidate	Votes	%	±%
PPP	Raja Pervaiz Ashraf	81,761	46.49	
PML(Q)	Raja Shoukat Aziz	46,383	26.37	
PML(N)	Ch. Muhammad Khurshid Zaman	26,895	15.29	
PAT	Dr. Muhammad Tahir-Ul-Qadri	15,213	8.65	
MMA	Ch. Tariq Mehmood Naqshbandi Gujar	5,082	2.89	
Pak Wattan Party	Syed Mozam Ali Rizvi	533	0.31	
Turnout		179,187	51.87	
Total valid votes		175,867	98.15	
Rejected ballots		3,320	1.85	
Majority		35,378	20.12	
Registered electors		345,475		

=== Election 2008 ===
The result of general election 2008 in this constituency is given below. Raja Pervaiz Ashraf succeeded in the election 2008 and became the member of National Assembly.

General election 2008: NA-51 Rawalpindi-II
Party	Candidate	Votes	%	±%
PPP	Raja Pervaiz Ashraf	80,247	38.82	
PML(Q)	Raja Qasim Javaid Ikhlas	69,690	33.71	
PML(N)	Ch. Muhammad Riaz	56,381	27.28	
Others	Others (two candidates)	399	0.19	
Turnout		210,220	53.85	
Total valid votes		206,717	98.33	
Rejected ballots		3,503	1.67	
Majority		10,557	5.11	
Registered electors		390,375		
PPP gain from PML(Q)				

=== Election 2013 ===
The result of general election 2013 in this constituency is given below. Muhammad Javed Ikhlas succeeded in the election 2013 and became the member of National Assembly.

General election 2013: NA-51 Rawalpindi-II
Party	Candidate	Votes	%	±%
PML(N)	Raja Muhammad Javed Ikhlas	121,296	50.54	
PPP	Raja Pervaiz Ashraf	67,241	28.02	
PTI	Farhat Faheem Bhatti	39,997	16.67	
Others	Others (seventeen candidates)	11,477	4.77	
Turnout		245,826	54.33	
Total valid votes		240,011	97.63	
Rejected ballots		5,815	2.37	
Majority		54,055	22.52	
Registered electors		452,466		
PML(N) gain from PPP				

=== Election 2018 ===
General elections were held on 25 July 2018.

General election 2018: NA-58 Rawalpindi-II
Party	Candidate	Votes	%	±%
PPP	Raja Pervaiz Ashraf	125,480	38.11	
PTI	Choudhary Muhammad Azeem	97,084	29.48	
PML(N)	Muhammad Javed Ikhlas	72,764	22.10	
TLP	Muhammad Ramzan Awan	23,491	7.13	
Others	Others (six candidates)	10,453	3.17	
Turnout		339,911	54.00	
Total valid votes		329,272	96.87	
Rejected ballots		10,639	3.13	
Majority		28,396	8.62	
Registered electors		629,386		
PPP gain from PML(N)				

=== Election 2024 ===
General elections were held on 8 February 2024. Raja Pervaiz Ashraf won the election with 113,015 votes.

General election 2024: NA-52 Rawalpindi-I
Party	Candidate	Votes	%	±%
PPP	Raja Pervaiz Ashraf	113,015	34.45	▼3.66
PTI	Tariq Aziz Bhatti (Note: Filed nomination papers as PTI candidate but ECP allowed him to run as an Independent)	91,918	28.02	▼1.46
PML(N)	Muhammad Javed Ikhlas	71,884	21.91	▼0.19
TLP	Chaudhry Muhammad Riaz	37,001	11.28	▲4.15
Others	Others (fifteen candidates)	14,256	4.35	
Turnout		336,327	50.47	▼3.53
Total valid votes		328,074	97.57	
Rejected ballots		8,253	2.43	
Majority		21,097	6.43	▼2.19
Registered electors		666,216		
PPP hold				

== See also ==
- NA-51 Murree-cum-Rawalpindi
- NA-53 Rawalpindi-II
