= Muhammad Javed =

Muhammad Javed is the name of:

- Muhammad Javed Ikhlas (born 1955), mayor of Rawalpindi, Pakistan
- Muhammad Javed Buttar (born 1948), former justice of Supreme Court of Pakistan
- Makhdoom Muhammad Javed Hashmi (born 1948), Pakistani politician
- Muhammad Javed (cricketer) (born 1964), Pakistani cricketer
- Muhammad Javed (field hockey), Pakistani field-hockey player in 2008 Olympics team squad
- Mohammad Javed, Pakistani cricketer
