= Alpial =

The Alpial is a Muslim Rajput tribe found in the Rawalpindi and Attock Districts of Pakistani Punjab. They claim their origins from Manj Rajputs, with their culture being similar to the Hindu Rajputs in traditions of marriage and other aspects of life.

They were first recorded in the 20th century, with nearly all members following Islam. Prior to that were recorded with the neighbouring tribes of the region and are closely connected to the Jodhra tribe.

As of 1931 census, their total population in Punjab was 9,399.

== Notable members ==
- Chaudhary Nisar Ali Khan, former Interior Minister of Pakistan.
