= Chaudhry M. Khurshid Zaman =

Pakistani politician

Member of the National Assembly of Pakistan
- Incumbent
- Assumed office 1997
- Constituency: NA-37 (Rawalpindi-II)

Personal details
- Born: December 25, 1971 (age 54) Rawalpindi, Pakistan
- Party: Pakistan Muslim League (N)
- Occupation: Politician, social activist, intellectual, businessman, agriculturist
- Known for: Co-founding Tareeq Tahafaz-e-Pakistan, Ministerial roles in Defence, Civil Aviation, Defence Production

Chaudhry M. Khurshid Zaman (born 25 December 1971) is a Pakistani politician and social activist. As senior member of the Pakistan Muslim League (Nawaz) he gained prominence for his early entry into national politics, and continues to make contributions to governance, public service, and philosophical thought.

== Early life and education ==
Zaman was born in Rawalpindi. His elder brother, Chaudhry Muhammad Riaz, is also a politician who has served as both a provincial minister in Punjab and as a member of the National Assembly (MNA).

== Political career ==
In 1997, Zaman was elected to the 11th National Assembly of Pakistan from NA-37 (Rawalpindi-II), becoming one of the youngest parliamentarians. He was appointed parliamentary secretary for defense, where he contributed to policy discussions on national security, civil-military relations, and defense strategy.

Later, Zaman acquired ministerial responsibilities as minister in charge of the Ministry of Defence (Pakistan), Ministry of Defence production, and civil aviation. Through these appointments he was charged with overseeing military procurement, national defence strategy, and the modernisation of Pakistan's aviation sector.

In 2003, he reportedly served in an advisory role to Prime Minister Mir Zafarullah Khan Jamali, offering insights on administrative reforms, youth mobilisation, and governance efficiency.

He co-founded the Tarqeq Tarhanas-e-Pakistan (Save Pakistan Movement) with the nuclear scientist Dr. Abdul Qadeer Khan. The movement called for institutional accountability, civic engagement, and unity during a critical period in the country's democratic development.

He also served as Chairman of the Council of Parliamentarians Pakistan for six years, promoting legislative innovation, cross-party collaboration, and democratic consolidation.

== Social and charitable work ==
Zaman is the founder of "No Doctor, No Medicine," a public health initiative serving urban and rural areas of Pakistan. The program champions preventive healthcare, nutritional education, and fitness awareness, particularly among low-income and underserved communities.

In addition, it empowers youth through traditional sports like wrestling and martial arts—encouraging physical wellness, discipline, and community participation. Through camps, clinics, and educational outreach, the initiative fosters a culture of self-reliance and health literacy.

== Philosophical engagement and thought leadership ==
Known as a "philosopher-politician," Zaman approaches politics with an Islamic philosophical lens, drawing from the wisdom of Imam Al-Ghazali, Allama Iqbal, and Maulana Rumi.

He regularly mentors youth and delivers lectures on ethical governance, Islamic values in political life, and the moral challenges facing contemporary societies. His work bridges classical philosophy and modern policy challenges.

== Business and agricultural work ==
Beyond politics, Zaman is an agriculturist. He is actively involved in corporate farming, promoting innovation in agricultural practices. Through training programs and knowledge transfer, he educates farmers on how to apply modern technology, data-driven methods, and crop diversification to significantly increase income beyond traditional crop yields.

His model supports sustainable agriculture, environmental stewardship, and economic empowerment in rural communities. His efforts aim to revolutionize farming in Pakistan—turning it from subsistence to enterprise.
