= 2023 Bara bombing =

Suicide bombing in Pakistan

2023 Bara blast
- Date: 20 July 2023
- Location: Bara, Khyber Pakhtunkhwa, Pakistan
- Cause: Suicide bombing
- Deaths: 4+
- Injuries: 11+

On 20 July 2023, an explosion occurred at the tehsil compound office in Bara, Khyber Pakhtunkhwa, resulting in the loss of 3 police officer's lives and injuring 9 other individuals, including 2 civilians.

== Background ==
According to reports, the blast, which took place at the main gate of the compound, was the result of a suicide bombing. The compound housed a police station and government offices in the northwest region of Pakistan. The attack claimed the lives of at least four police officers and left 11 others wounded.

== Response ==
Following the incident, law enforcement and rescue teams promptly arrived at the scene and secured the area. The injured were swiftly taken to nearby medical facilities for treatment. Additionally, there were reports of heavy gunfire in the vicinity after the explosion.

== Reactions ==
Prime Minister Shehbaz Sharif, interior minister Rana Sanaullah Khyber Pakhtunkhwa Governor, Haji Ghulam Ali and Khyber Pakhtunkhwa's Caretaker Minister for Information and Auqaf, Barrister Feroze Jamal Shah Kakakhel also denounced the explosion and deeply mourned the loss of the policeman's life and extended his sympathies to the bereaved families.

== See also ==
- 2023 Khar bombing
