= The Frontier Post =

Pakistani Newspaper

Frontier Post
- Type: Daily Newspaper and Magazine
- Format: Broadsheet
- Owner: Frontier Publications Pvt Ltd
- Founder: Rehmat Shah Afridi
- Editor-in-chief: Bilal Afridi
- Editor: Jalil Afridi
- Founded: 1998
- Language: English
- Headquarters: Peshawar, Pakistan
- Website: thefrontierpost.com

The Frontier Post is an independent English language daily newspaper founded in Peshawar, Pakistan, in 1985. It publishes from Peshawar, Lahore, Islamabad, Karachi, and Quetta.

== History ==
When the paper was founded in 1985, there were no prominent journalists based in the area, and its original editor Aziz Siddiqi was neither an ethnic Pukhtoon (the dominant population of Peshawar) nor from a Pukhtoon area. Former Khyber Pakhtunkhwa governor Fazle Haq along with several entrepreneurs were engaged in founding the paper.

The founder, chief editor and publisher, Rehmat Shah Afridi, has been termed a "prisoner of conscience" by Amnesty International due to his longstanding struggle for democracy and media freedom in Pakistan; Afridi was arrested in 1999. Jalil Afridi had been running The Frontier Post as its Managing Editor since 1999.
