= Shahzada Ahsan Ashraf =

Pakistani Politician

Shahzada Ahsan Ashraf Shaikh is an independent Pakistani politician and businessman. In 2023, he was appointed as the federal housing minister in Pakistan's interim caretaker cabinet under PM Anwar Ul Haq Kakar.

== Career ==
Before his current ministerial role in the caretaker cabinet, Shahzada Ahsan served briefly as the Federal Minister for Industries and Production in the 2013 caretaker government led by PM Khoso. During his short time in this position, he oversaw some of Pakistan's largest state-owned enterprises, including PIA, Pakistan Steel Mills, Utility Stores, and the Heavy Mechanical Complex facilities.
