= Younus Soomro =

Pakistani orthopedic surgeon and caretaker minister (died 2020)

Yunis Haider Soomro
- يونس حيدر سومرو

Minister for Housing and Works
- In office 2 April 2013 – 7 June 2013
- President: Asif Ali Zardari
- Prime Minister: Mir Hazar Khan Khoso (caretaker)

Personal details
- Born: Shikarpur, Sindh
- Died: July 2020
- Relations: Allah Bux Soomro (grandfather)
- Children: 1

Yunis Haider Soomro (Sindhi: يونس حيدر سومرو) was a Pakistani orthopaedic surgeon and former caretaker minister. He was the Minister for Housing and Works in Khoso caretaker ministry in 2013. He was known as an expert of the Russian Ilizarov limb-lengthening technique in orthopaedic surgery. He was a landlord and politician as well. Soomro was known for his philanthropy and charity work.

He was the grandson of the former Chief Minister of Sindh Allah Bux Soomro.

He died on July 15, 2020, after contracting the COVID-19 virus.
