= Omar Afridi =

Pakistani civil servant and politician

Caretaker Minister of Interior
- In office 5 November 1996 – 17 February 1997
- Prime Minister: Malik Meraj Khalid

Caretaker Minister for States and Frontier Regions
- In office 5 November 1996 – 17 February 1997
- Prime Minister: Malik Meraj Khalid

Caretaker Minister for Narcotics Control
- In office 5 November 1996 – 17 February 1997
- Prime Minister: Malik Meraj Khalid

Personal details
- Born: January 1934 London, United Kingdom
- Died: 11 March 2021 (aged 87)
- Children: Yahya Afridi
- Occupation: Civil servant

Omar Khan Afridi (January 1934 – 11 March 2021) was a Pakistani civil servant and politician who briefly served as the minister of interior, minister for states and frontier regions, and minister for narcotics control in the caretaker government of Prime Minister Malik Meraj Khalid from November 1996 to February 1997. He previously served in senior administrative positions including chief secretary of the North-West Frontier Province, administrator of Islamabad Capital Territory, and secretary to the president of Pakistan.

== Early life and education ==
Afridi was born in London in January 1934 and belonged to the Adamkhel branch of the Afridi tribe from the Kohat region. He received his early education at Presentation Convent, Murree, Bishop Cotton School in Shimla, Karachi Grammar School, and Victoria College in Alexandria, Egypt.

He joined the Pakistan Army as a cadet and was awarded the Sword of Honour and the Norman Gold Medal at the Pakistan Military Academy. He was commissioned in March 1954 and joined Probyn's Horse as a second lieutenant. He left the army after being selected for the civil service in 1960.

== Civil service career ==
Afridi served as political agent in South Waziristan from 1968 to 1971 and later as deputy commissioner of Mardan. He also served as secretary of the home and tribal affairs department in the then North-West Frontier Province, additional chief secretary of Balochistan, commissioner of Lahore Division, and administrator of Islamabad Capital Territory.

He later became chief secretary of the North-West Frontier Province and subsequently served as secretary to the president of Pakistan, which was his final posting before retirement in 1994.

== Political career ==
Afridi joined the federal caretaker cabinet of Prime Minister Malik Meraj Khalid on 5 November 1996 and served until 17 February 1997. During that period, he held the portfolios of interior, states and frontier regions, and narcotics control.

== Personal life ==
Afridi was the father of jurist Yahya Afridi, who later became the Chief Justice of Pakistan.

Afridi also wrote two books, Pukhtanah: A Concise Account and Mahsud Monograph.

Afridi died on 11 March 2021 at the age of 87 and was buried in his ancestral village of Babri Banda in Kohat district.
