= Directorate General of Civil Defence (Pakistan) =

Pakistani government agency

Agency overview
- Jurisdiction: Pakistan
- Website: Official Website

The Directorate General of Civil Defence (Urdu: نظامتِ عامہ برائے شہری دفاع پاکستان) provides civil defence and emergency services in Pakistan. It's a department of the Ministry of Interior, Government of Pakistan.

The Directorate General of Civil Defence also operates the Civil Defence Academy, Lahore and National Institute of Fire Technology, Islamabad.

Civil Defence Organization is the continuity of Air Raid Precaution Volunteer units which existed before 1951. That year Civil Defence (Special Powers) Ordinance, 1951 was enacted which later on became Civil Defence Act, 1952 and in 1968 it was furthermore extended to Civil Defence Rules 1966 and 1968. Overall it is called Civil Defence Special Powers Rules 1951. Civil Defence Service Rules 1966 regulate Pakistan civil defence service structure and rules related to it and there was an update to Civil Defence Uniform Rules in 1986. According to these rules the uniforms of all staff and razakars were defined, described and documented.

== Organization Structure ==
=== Federal ===
- Director General of Civil Defence Pakistan (BPS Grade 20 Officer) – Responsible for Policy, Planning, Coordination Administration & supervision of the working of Federal Civil Defence structure across Pakistan.
- Director (Admin/Coordination ) (BPS grade 19 Officer) – Responsible to assist DGCD in the above spheres. To supervise the working of all sections in the Dte. Gen. Civil Defence Coordination with the Training Institutions. Represent the DGCD at different forums.
- Deputy. Director (Technical) (BPS grade 18 Officer) – Responsible To assist the DCD in above spheres. To provide assistance in the technical matters.
- Assistant Director (A&C) (BPS grade 17 Officer) – Responsible To assist the DCD in administrative affairs. To supervise the working of admin section.
- Assistant Director (Trg) (BPS grade 17 Officer) – Responsible To assist the DCD in Training affairs. To supervise the working of Training Section. Coordination with Training Institutes.
- Assistant Director (Budget & Accounts) (BPS Grade 17 Officer) – Responsible To assist the DCD in Financial affairs. To supervise the working of Budget section. Preparation & Distribution of Budget / Auditing.
- Assistant Director (P&T/ Camouflage) (BPS Grade 17 Officer) – Responsible To assist the DCD in maintaining camouflage files / documents Supervision of section work.

=== Provincial ===
Provincial Civil Defence departments are under the home departments of every province. They consist of:

1. Civil Defence Department, Islamabad Capital Territory
2. Civil Defence Department, Punjab
3. Civil Defence Department, Sindh
4. Civil Defence Department, Balochistan
5. Civil Defence Department, KPK
6. Civil Defence Department, Gilgit Baltistan
7. Civil Defence Department, Azad Jammu And Kashmir

Each Department is distributed on district level Civil Defence Departments which are further divided into Organization Wing and Departmental employees.

== See also ==
- Ministry of Interior (Pakistan)
- Government of Pakistan
