= Abdul Malik Kasi =

Pakistani politician and professional paediatrician (1937–2021)

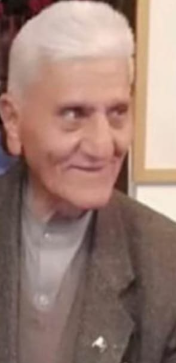

Ministry of Health and Religious affairs (2000–2003) Ministry of Railways Pakistan 2013
- In office 2000–2003, 2013 – 7 June 2013
- President: Perviz Mushraff 2000-2003 Asif Ali Zardari 2013
- Prime Minister: Mir Hazar Khan Khoso (caretaker)

Personal details
- Born: 10 January 1937 Quetta, Balochistan, Pakistan
- Died: 14 August 2021 (aged 84) Quetta, Balochistan, Pakistan
- Children: Zarghuna kasi, Dawood Jan Kasi, Bakthawar kasi, Malala Kasi, Inayatullah Kasi, Ubaidullah Kasi,

Abdul Malik Kasi (10 January 1937 – 14 August 2021) was a Pakistani physician and politician who twice served as a caretaker minister. He was the Minister of Railways in Khoso caretaker ministry in 2013 and Minister for Health in Soomro caretaker ministry in 2008. He was a child specialist (pediatrician) and had his own medical center. Kasi died after a prolonged illness in Quetta on 14 August 2021, at the age of 84.
