= Zarif Khan =

American restaurateur and investor

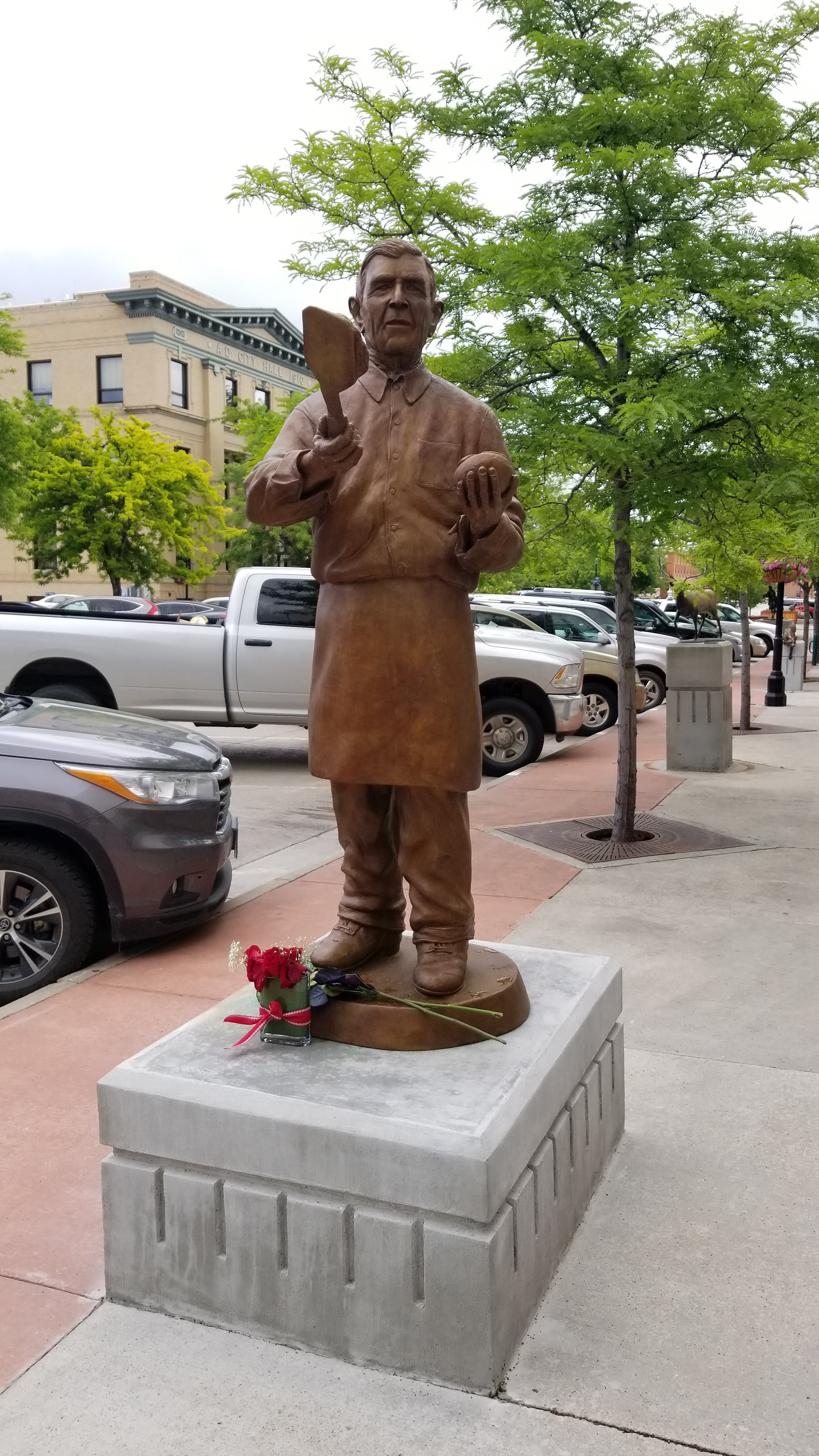
- Statue of Khan in his adopted hometown of Sheridan, Wyoming
- Born: 1887 (present-day Bara, North-West Frontier Province, British Raj
- Died: 1964 (aged 76–77); Bara, Federally Administered Tribal Areas, Pakistan
- Other name: Tamale Louie
- Occupations: Investor, restaurant owner

Zarif Khan (Pashto: ؛ظریف خان (also known as Hot Tamale Louie; born 1887 -died 1964) was an restaurant owner from what is now Pakistan and investor. Khan operated a restaurant, Louie's in Sheridan, Wyoming, which served tamales, hamburgers, and other dishes. Khan was apprentice to the original owner, a German immigrant named Louis Menge, and kept the restaurant's name after Menge became a farmer in Montana.

== Biography ==
Khan was born into a Pashtun Family the village of Bara, British India (present-day Khyber Pakhtunkhwa, Pakistan). Khan immigrated from British India to the United States in 1907 and eventually settled in Sheridan in 1909. He purchased the restaurant from a German immigrant named Louis Menge, and kept the restaurant's name, "Louie’s". The restaurant prospered and Khan became known as "Hot Tamale Louie".

Khan became a prominent figure in his community and was recognized for his generosity. Khan served everyone from Native Americans to women working at brothels nearby who were too poor to buy the food. In one instance, Khan bought the wedding ring for a loyal customer's fiancé who couldn't afford it.

Khan became a naturalized citizen of the United States in February 1926, but in December he was found ineligible (in accordance with United States v. Bhagat Singh Thind) and denaturalized. In 1954, Khan was re-granted citizenship following a second application.

In 1964, while on a family trip back to Bara, Khan was fatally stabbed by his grandnephew, Sultan Khan, over a dispute. Sultan was tried, found guilty and hanged in 1966. Khan was buried in Bara, while his wife Fatima returned to Sheridan and raised her children there.

Khan's wife sued for a larger portion of his estate after his death. Descendants of Khan still live in Wyoming.

=== Tributes and Honors ===
Following a "Stop Islam in Gillette" movement in 2015, retired Lt. Col. Dana Arbaugh of the U.S. Air Force was inspired to pay respect to Khan with a stature near where he once served food. The statue of Khan was unveiled in Sheridan's Grinnell Plaza in April 2018. In 2019, the Cam-plex Heritage Center Theatre, in Gillette, Wyoming, hosted performances of "Hot Tamale Louie: The Story of Zarif Khan, a tale told through Jazz", created by Professor John Rapson of the University of Iowa Music's Jazz Studies Program.
