= Shahzada Jamal Nazir =

Pakistani politician

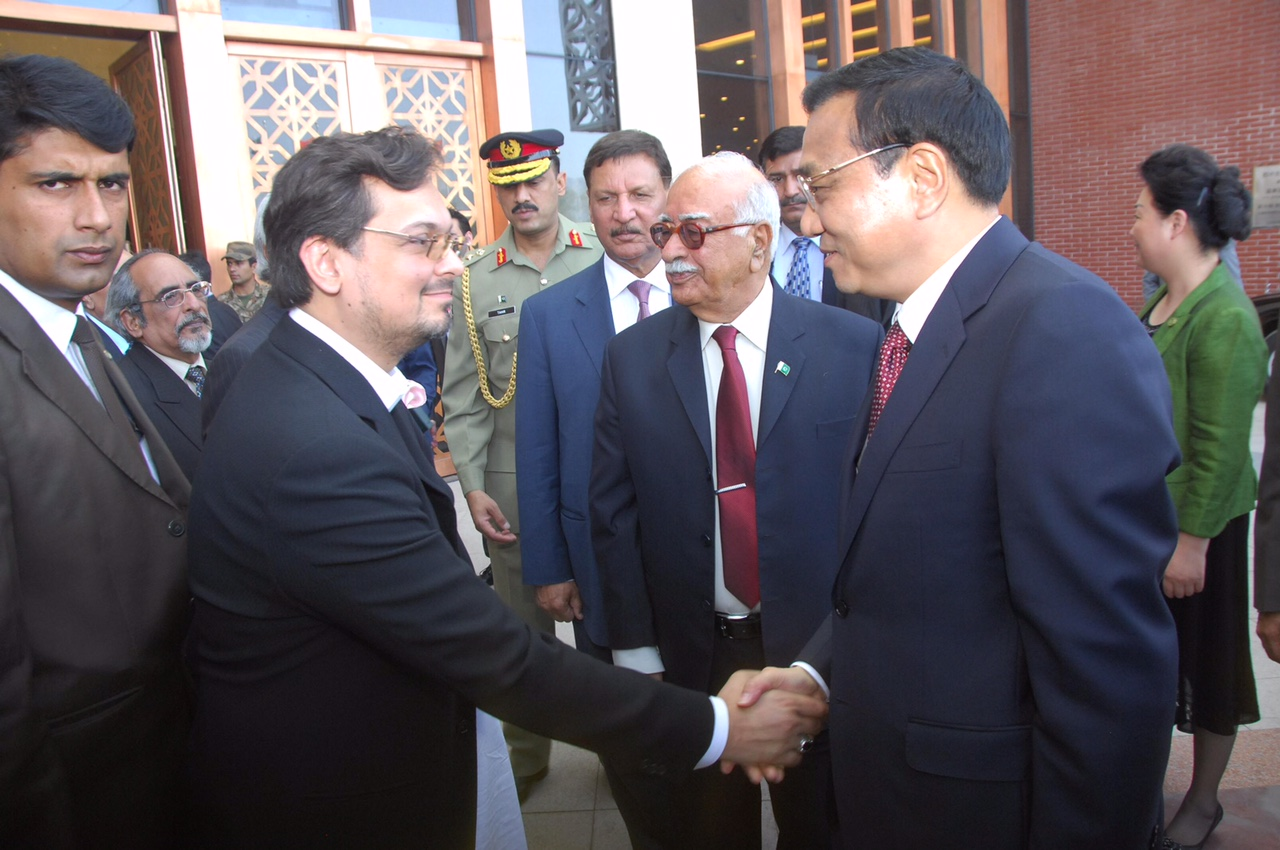
- Greeting Chinese Prime Minister Li Keqiang (Islamabad, Pakistan, 2013)

Federal Minister of the Cabinet of Pakistan and Adviser with status of Minister of State to the Government of Pakistan
- In office 2011–2013
- President: Asif Ali Zardari
- Prime Minister: Yousaf Raza Gillani; Raja Pervaiz Ashraf; Mir Hazar Khan Khoso

Member National Commission for Minorities, Ministry of Religious Affairs, Government of Pakistan
- In office 2014–2018
- President: Mamnoon Hussain
- Prime Minister: Mian Muhammad Nawaz Sharif

Personal details
- Born: 6 November 1973 (age 53) Rawalpindi, Pakistan
- Party: Independent
- Profession: Lawyer, Independent Consultant

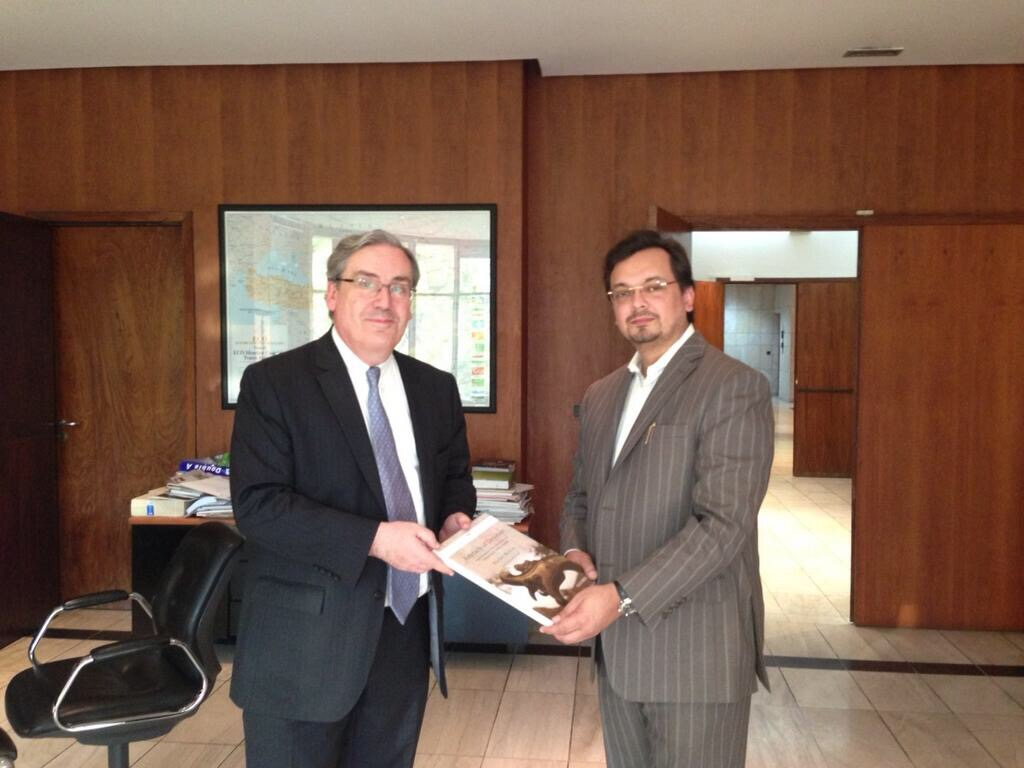
Shahzada Jamal Nazir with French Ambassador Philippe Thiebaud

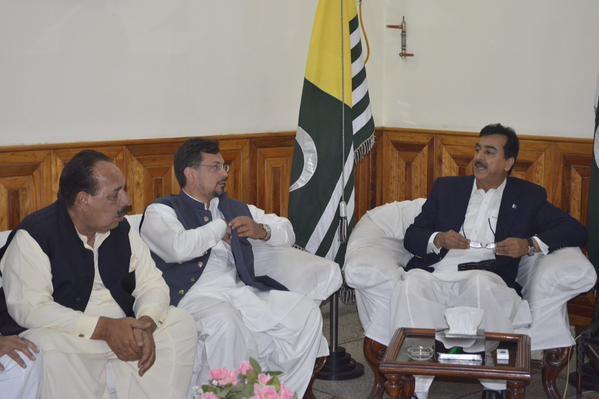
Shahzada Jamal Nazir with Prime Minister Syed Yousuf Raza Gilani and Prime Minister AJK Ch. Abdul Majied

Shahzada 'Prince' Jamal Nazir (Urdu: شہزادہ جمال نظیر; born 1973) is a Pakistani politician. In 2011, he was appointed by Prime Minister Syed Yousaf Raza Gilani as adviser with the status of Federal Minister of State for the Ministry of National Regulations and Services. In 2013, he served in the interim cabinet as the Federal Minister for four ministries that included Ministry of Religious Affairs, Ministry of National Interfaith Harmony (old Minorities Ministry), Ministry of National Health Services Regulations & Coordination, and Ministry of National Heritage & Integration. Currently, he is serving as Member National Commission on Minorities as a former Minister for National Interfaith Harmony.

He is the younger son of the Sufi leader Pir Haroon Al Rasheed. In 2006, he married the daughter of Nawabzada Salahuddin Saeed, the head of the former princely state of Amb, now part of Khyber Pakhtunkhwa.

== Education ==
Nazir attended high school at the Orme School, in Arizona. He earned his Bachelor of Arts in Economics from the Eli Broad College of Business at Michigan State University. Nazir received a Juris Doctor from the Sturm College of Law and Master of Laws in Taxation (LL.M.), from Daniels College of Business at the University of Denver. He also has a Master of Public Administration in Personnel and Labor Relations from Northern Michigan University in Marquette, Michigan.

== Minister for National Health Services Regulations and Coordination ==
=== Drug pricing policy and corruption ===
Nazir as Minister for National Health Services Regulations took a strong stance in his own capacity against all forms of corruption facilitated within the Drug Regulatory Authority of Pakistan. On 9 April 2013, addressing the Senate's Standing Committee on National Regulations and Services, Shahzada Jamal Nazir made clear his resolve stating, "There will be no compromise on corruption, if anybody tries to do so it will be over my dead body." Thereafter he ensured steps were taken in accordance to implement his vision for change and transparency within the departments involved.

=== Inquiry to probe corruption sent to federal investigation agency ===
On 3 May 2013, Shahzada Jamal Nazir asked the Director General FIA to hold an inquiry in line with his directions and stance against corruption that has declared a zero tolerance policy. Following are some the subjects that were referred to FIA:

Drug Regulatory Authority of Pakistan (DRAP): Inquiry to probe non-transparent practices, dubious delays, out of line favouritism and losses incurred to the public exchequer pertaining to (a) Pricing (b) Registration and (c) Licensing.

The most important step was the initiatives taken to place moratorium on price increases which was imposed twice. Also, facilitated a probe by NAB for ensuring that there are no irregularities or favouritism in pricing in DRAP.

National Council for Homoeopathy (NCH):
i) Irregularities committed in reimbursement of TA/DA to Council Members.

ii) Irregularities committed in appointment of acting Registrar NCH.

iii) Irregularities committed in conduction of 2012 annual / supplementary examination.

iv) Irregularities committed in cash withdrawal for payment of salary to 16 ghost employees in connivance with the then Deputy Secretary (Admn) NR&S who was also the Chairman of the NCH Finance Committee. A monthly cheque of Rs 365,009/- was withdrawn as cash w.e.f 1 July 2012 and paid to the then DS(Admn). Mode and method of disbursement of this money is unaccounted for. Show Cause notice served to the President NCH for his administrative and financial negligence in the affairs of the council.

Ordered external audit of NCH and formed a Ministerial team to accompany NCH inspection teams while visiting homoeopathic institutions to ensure transparency.

Pharmacy Council of Pakistan (PCP):

i) Irregularities committed in granting of permission for evening shift of Pakistan Institute of Pharmacy, Dubai Garden, Plot No 5, GT Road, Sahiwal.

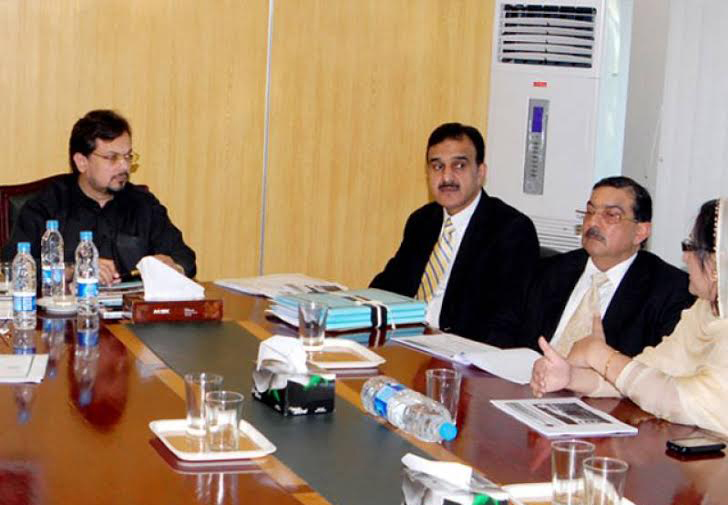
Shahzada Jamal Nazir directing the PMDC officials to take stringent action against bogus medical and dental school registrations.

Pakistan Medical & Dental Council ("PMDC"):

i) FIA may wish to take cognizance of the 19 medical colleges recognised by the former Registrar and the Ministry staff at the time.

ii) Irregularities committed in granting recognition to Doctors / Dentists without fulfilment of codal formalities.

Achievements to reform the functions of the Ministry

The Federal Minister for National Regulations & Services, Shahzada Jamal Nazir ever since assuming charge of the Ministry of National Regulations & Services (now National Health Services Regulations and Coordination) has adopted a zero tolerance policy against corruption and malpractices in this Ministry. Nazir after assuming the helm of affairs not only initiated inquiries and made administrative changes in almost all subjects which are under the control of this Ministry. An operation 'clean up' the house from financial and administrative irregularities and mis-governance was decided upon so that good governance practices can be implemented and culprits are brought to the book for misusing official authority and plunder of the public exchequer or public interest at large.

The following initiatives have been undertaken by the Honorable Minister for NR&S, Shahzada Jamal Nazir after assuming charge of this Ministry:-

Drug Regulatory Authority of Pakistan ("DRAP"): Registration

- Initiatives will be taken to make life saving drugs freely available in the market.
- Procedure for registration of drugs has been review in line with stringent measures adopted by international regulatory authorities.

Pricing

- Directives have been issued to finalise Drug Pricing Policy so that the prices are fixed in a transparent manner and drugs are made available at affordable prices to the general public.
- Pricing moratorium imposed on directions of Federal Minister till the approval of Pricing Policy.

Administrative Measures

- Framing of service rules and regulations.
- Removal of un-qualified persons from the Policy Board.
- Directions to develop strategy against low quality and illegal drug manufacturers.
- Vigilance cell be established for monitoring DRAP

National Council for Homoeopathy ("NCH")

- External audit of NCH ordered.
- Financial discipline instituted in NCH.
- Show Cause notice served to the President NCH for his administrative and financial negligence in the affairs of the council.
- New honest officer appointed as chairman Finance Committee of NCH w.e.f 18 April 2013.
- Ministerial team formed to accompany NCH inspection teams while visiting homoeopathic institutions to ensure transparency.
- Stringent in-house measures being adopted to curb the menace of maladministration and financial apathy in the council as reported by the general public at large.
- All financial and administrative amendments proposed in the NCH rules have been withheld from further processing until the same have been scrutinised further.

National Council for Tibb ("NCT")

- Preparation for elections are being made by this Ministry in light of relevant rules for appointment of a regular Tibb Council composed of relevant members as specified in the UAH Act, 1965.
- Financial discipline instituted in NCT, clear instructions to submit monthly bank statements to the Ministry.
- Amendments in yardsticks governing NCT regulations pertaining to Tibb educational institutions being scrutinised in light of justifications and resources.

International Health Regulation (IHR-2005)

- Action plan submitted to the World Health Organization (WHO) for obtaining two years extension for implementation of IHR-2005.
- Legislative, surveillance and response capacities being developed in collaboration of WHO for ensuring effective communication from the district level to the Federal level.

Pakistan Medical & Dental Council ("PMDC")

- An inquiry is being conducted expeditiously against the 19 medical colleges recognised by the former Registrar and the Ministry staff involved.
- Directive to implement the existing PMDC rule for teaching hospitals that they have to make 50% of beds available free of cost to the public. This matter was also discussed with the Honorable Chief Minister of Punjab who has concurred with the Federal Minister's proposal.
- Directive to develop and maintain a database of specialists so that their affiliation with teaching institutions can be tracked to avoid their inclusion by multiple institutions.
- Directive to launch a campaign against quackery starting with the Islamabad Capital Area to turn this into a model for other regions.
- Further directions to use modern investigative techniques and latest audio visual technology to record evidence against quacks.
- Directive to co-ordinate with PEMRA to fight quackery and false advertising on media
- Directive to propose amendments to the PMDC Act and necessary regulations to make it more effective in its fight against quacks

Administrative initiatives in the Ministry ("MoNRS")

- A case for re-substitution of the post of Director General NR&S to its original nomenclature of Joint Secretary has been submitted to the Prime Minister via the Establishment Division as the same was converted without approval of the competent authority.

Directorate of Central Health Establishment ("CHE") Karachi

- The acting Director of CHE, Dr Liaquat Ali Bhutto removed on complaints of corruption, favouritism and general administrative mismanagement.
- Dr Sher Baz Khan, senior most Doctor of CHE has been given current charge of Director CHE.
- All tenders initiated by Dr Liaquat Ali Bhutto have been cancelled by this Ministry. Furthermore, CHE has been directed not to initiate any new tender without prior permission of this Ministry.

Pharmacy Council of Pakistan

- Permission given by former Deputy Secretary (Admn) MoNRS, Mr Mustaeen Ahmed Alvi to Pharmacy College in Sahiwal has been withdrawn as the same was issued in contravention of rules without prior approval of the competent authority.
- Pharmacy Council has been advised to furnish brief and give presentation to honourable Minister on current administrative and financial issues with emphasis on achievements of the Pharmacy Council.

== Minister for National Interfaith Harmony ==
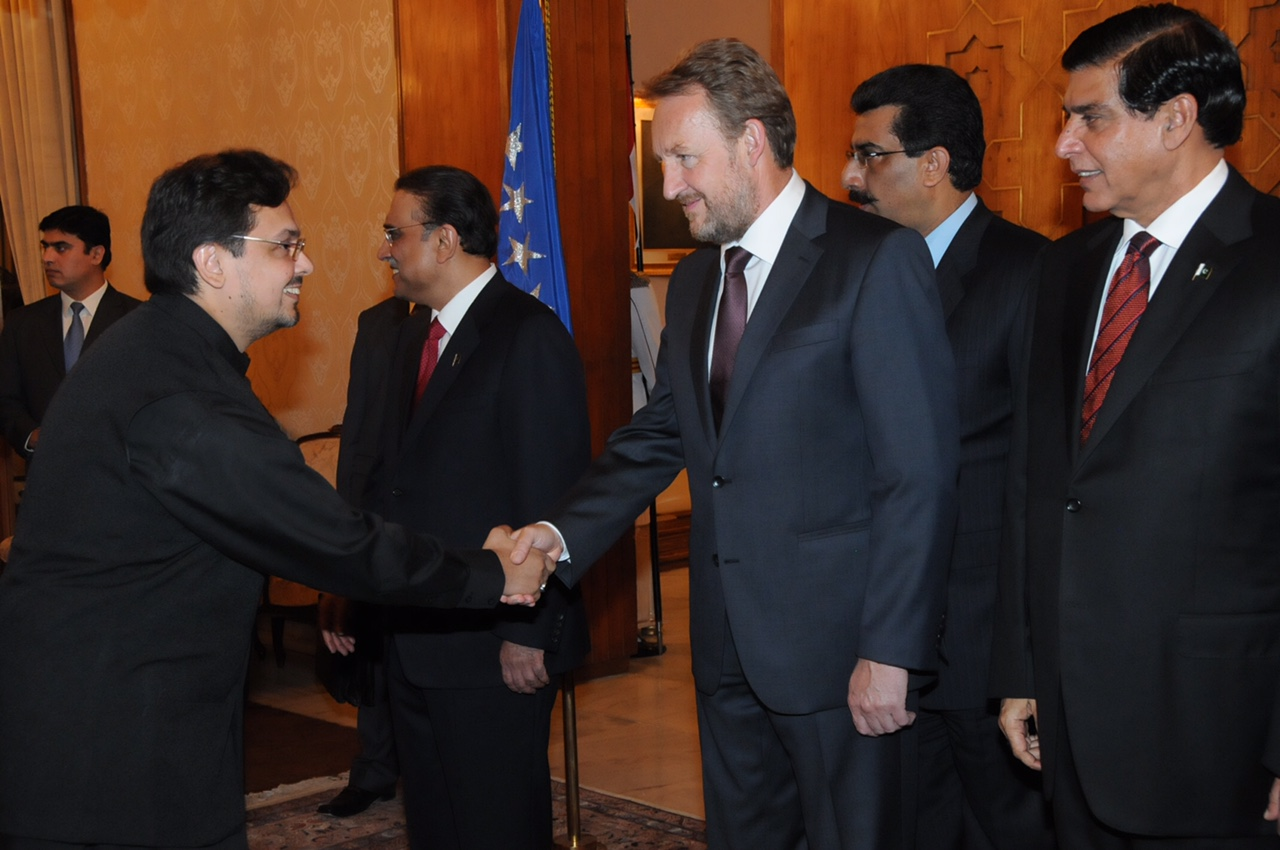
Shahzada Jamal Nazir greeting the Bosnian President Bakir Izetbegović at the state dinner with President Asif Ali Zardari and Prime Minister Raja Pervaiz Ashraf

As Federal Minister for National Interfaith Harmony, Nazir made all efforts for peace and tolerance in the society actively promoting interfaith dialogue and harmony among the people of different faiths.

- Information was collected regarding major worship places of Hindu and Sikh communities and the Ministry was instructed to provide them with fool proof security and protection.
- Ministry of Petroleum and Natural Resources was approach for the Sui-Gas connection for the temple of the Hindu community on priority basis.
- The occupied land of Lady Fatima Church, Islamabad was made possible to be released and was instructed to vacate land from illegal occupation.
- NADRA authorities were directed to accept the old record of the Christian families as maintained by the Churches.

== Achievements as Minister for Religious Affairs ==
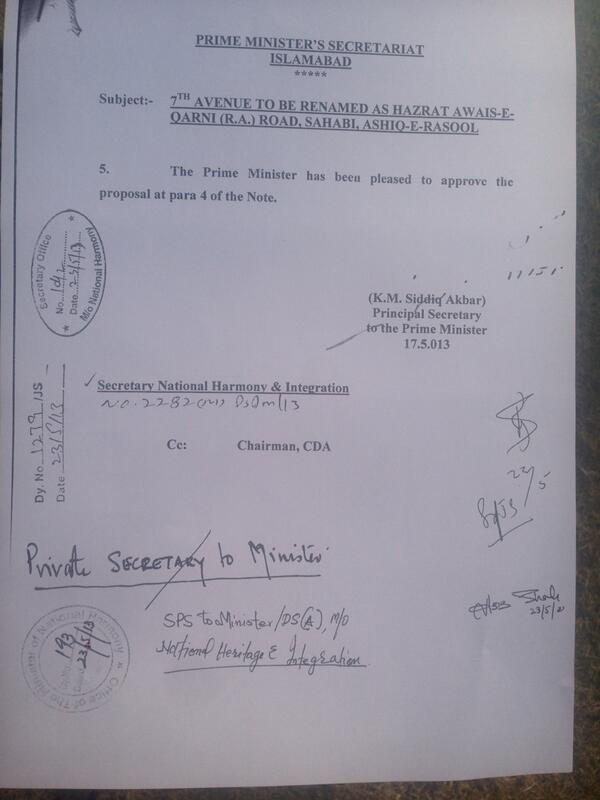
Prime Minister's approval to change name of 7th Avenue (Islamabad, Pakistan) to Owais Al-Qarni

- Eid was celebrated for the first time on the same day throughout the country. On the directions of the Minister the members of Central Rohet-e-Hilal Committee & Qasim Ali Khan Masjid were sent to each other's offices for consultation and co-ordination.
- Re-organization of 'Madaris Board' was initiated; but it was stopped due to change of government.
- The Islamic ideology Council was asked within the span of 29 days to clarify the business of idol-crafting, and for decoration, putting them at different public parks or places, with the exceptions for those that have historical value or are at the places of worship of Pakistani Non-Muslims.
- In Islamabad the 7th Avenue was renamed after Owais Al-Qarni with the proper request to and approval of the then Prime Minister. However, the current government has made no progress on it.

== Minister for National Heritage and Integration ==
Federal Minister for National Heritage and Integration, Shahzada Jamal Nazir made efforts for promotion of Pakistani literature and welfare of writer's community.

Inquiry sent to Federal Investigation Agency to Probe Corruption: Central Board of Film Censors (CBFC) Irregularities with respect to:- i) Files of movie censored are not complete in all respects and important documents are missing. ii) Additional fee of motion pictures which was to be deposited in the national treasury was not deposited as per prescribed rules. iii) Importers were in total control of this regulatory body and Indian Motion Pictures detrimental to the interest of Pakistan like AIK THA TIGER and AGENT VINOD were allowed in the era of the Ex-Chairman for which FIA inquiries in Islamabad and Lahore circles are still underway. Despite two (2) reminders to the parent Ministry by the incumbent administration, a financial audit has not been commenced. It is alleged that certification of Foreign films was done against money under the table and for English films the going rate was at the times of the former chairman CBFC. iv) 164 cards were issued to individuals who were so-called (coordinators) of the CBFC for facilitating their free entry into cinema houses across the country. This was a blatant disregard to rules as no such post exists. v) Members made to CBFC to facilitate approval of films on a fast track basis.

Proposed Policy and Achievements for Central Board of Film Censors

1. Encouraged Local Industry: On the directions of the Minister Nazir, Pakistani film producers were directed to be given a level playing field to compete with imported films in an effort to reinvigorate the film industry of Pakistan.
2. Highest Revenues in 5 years: Over 1 million was deposited in the national treasury in Federal Government receipts during the brief time Shahzada Jamal Nazir was the Minister. It was the highest revenue collection in the past 5 years.
3. MoFA included in CBFC: An official member of the Censor Board was added from the Ministry of Foreign Affairs as the CBFC is also responsible for censoring and regulating films of foreign missions located in Pakistan.
4. Zero Tolerance on Corruption: As per Shahzada Jamal Nazir's directive a stringent policy was adopted by the incumbent Administration for zero tolerance on corruption and strict adherence to the rules. FIA was engaged to investigate complaints of corruption over last five years.

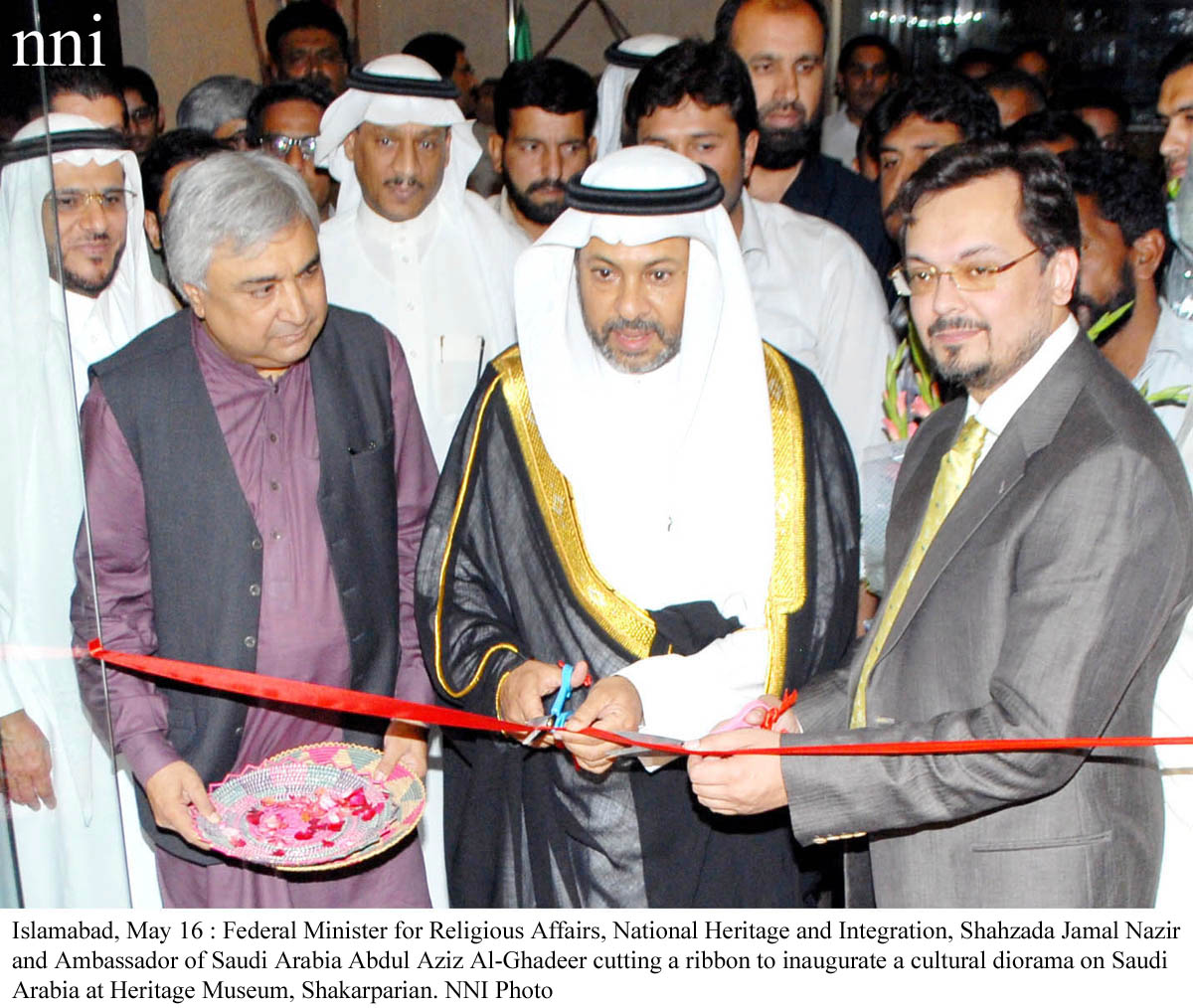
Shahzada Jamal Nazir With Saudi Ambassador

Cultural Heritage Diorama on Saudi Arabia at Lok Virsa Heritage Museum, Islamabad On the directions of Federal Minister Shahzada Jamal Nazir, the Ministry of National Heritage & Integration was pleased to establish a Cultural Heritage Diorama on the Kingdom of Saudi Arabia at the Lok Virsa museum, Islamabad. This was to illustrate not only the cultural of Saudi Arabia, but to in fact show how their cultural impacted upon the culture of Pakistan when Islam was introduced by the Arabs to the subcontinent. To honour the commitment of the Saudi Ambassador H.E. Dr. Abdul Aziz Bin Ibrahim Al Ghadeer to the people of Pakistan, on the directions of Shahzada Jamal Nazir the cultural diorama was named Al-Ghadeer room.

== Member National Commission on Minorities ==
In 2014, the Prime Minister Mian Muhammad Nawaz Sharif approved his appointment as a Member of the National Commission on Minorities, a commission, which in co-ordination with the Ministry of Religious Affairs is an initiative of the Prime Minister to engage Pakistanis of all beliefs in an interfaith dialogue to create harmony. His work for the minorities in Pakistan has been highly appreciated even in the international community.

== Nusrat Islam Peoples Network ==
Shahzada 'Prince' Jamal Nazir serves as Present Chairman of NIPN (Nusrat Islam Peoples Network). Nusrat-e-Islam is a social network of likeminded individuals in Pakistan from all walks of life, who are dedicated to creating a better Pakistan at all levels and providing humanitarian services to the people of Pakistan regardless of religion, colour, caste or creed as envisioned by the founding father Muhammad Ali Jinnah.

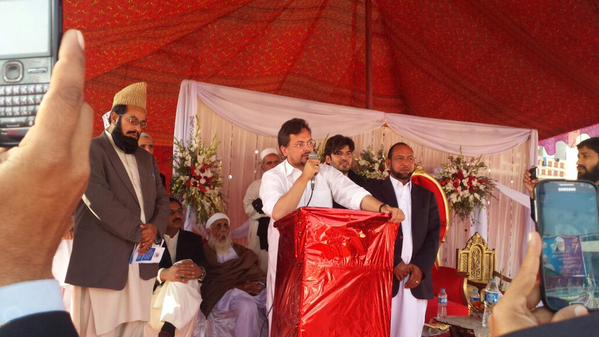
Shahzada Jamal Nazir

== Professional Legal Experience ==
Nazir has served as law clerk to Sidney B. Brooks, Chief Judge for the United States bankruptcy court for the District of Denver, Colorado. As a summer associate he also worked at the Gorsuch Kirgin LLP, a Denver, Colorado–based law firm. And as a bankruptcy associate at General Capital Partners, an investment firm. Among other literary contributions, he has authored a comprehensive article on Estate and Gift Taxation and Family Limited Partnerships.

In Pakistan he is a High Court advocate and has served as legal adviser/corporate lawyer with the Oil and Gas Development Company Limited (OGDCL). Nazir has also briefly taught Business Law to the MBA students at the Air University Islamabad, Pakistan.
