= Rehman Malik =

Pakistani politician (1951–2022)

Rehman Malik NI
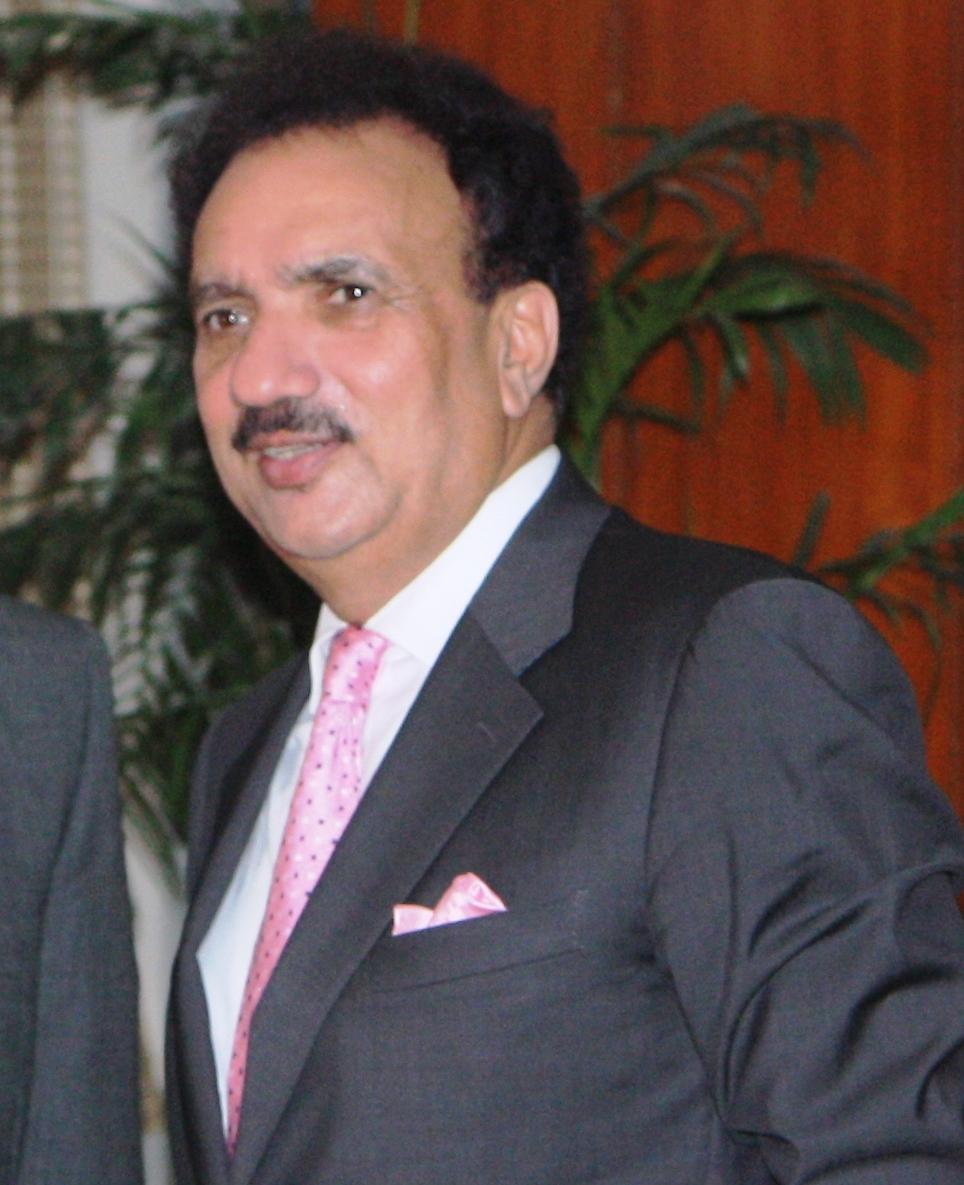
- Malik in 2010

33rd Minister of Interior
- In office 25 March 2008 – 16 March 2013
- President: Asif Zardari; Pervez Musharraf
- Prime Minister: Yousaf Gillani; Pervez Ashraf
- Preceded by: Hamid Nawaz-Khan
- Succeeded by: Malik Habib

Additional Director General of the Federal Investigation Agency
- In office 23 October 1993 – 10 November 1998
- Preceded by: G. Moinuddin
- Succeeded by: Iftikhar Ahmad Khan

Pakistani Senator from Sindh
- In office March 2009 – July 2012
- In office March 2015 – March 2021

Personal details
- Born: Rehman Malik; 12 December 1951 Sialkot, Punjab, Pakistan
- Died: 23 February 2022 (aged 70) Islamabad, Pakistan
- Citizenship: Pakistan (1951–2003; continued from 2013); United Kingdom (2003–2012)
- Party: Pakistan Peoples Party
- Education: University of Karachi
- Notable award(s): Nishan-e-Imtiaz (2012)

Rehman Malik NI (Punjabi, Urdu: رحمان ملک; born 12 December 1951 – 23 February 2022) was a Pakistani politician, and a former Federal Investigation Agency (FIA) officer, who later served as the federal Interior Minister from 25 March 2008 until 16 March 2013.

Prior to his entry in national politics, Malik had served in the FIA as a special agent, eventually becoming the Additional Director General of the Federal Investigation Agency in 1993 until 1996. During his stint as Director, he coordinated successful counter-terrorist operations in the country as well as abroad, including the arrest and extradition of Yousaf Ramzi to the United States in 1995. After being removed as director, Malik moved to the United Kingdom and began political activity on the PPP platform.

From 2004 until 2007, he served as the chief of security of Benazir Bhutto and became a member of the central committee of the PPP. After successfully contesting the 2008 general elections, Malik was appointed adviser and eventually Interior Minister by Prime Minister Yousaf Raza Gillani. In 2013, he lost his ministerial appointment after a Supreme Court hearing against the dual nationality case disqualified him from the Pakistan Senate.

== Biography ==
Malik was born on 12 December 1951 in Sialkot, Punjab, Pakistan. He gained his BSc degree and MSc in Statistics in 1973 from the Karachi University. In 2011, Malik was conferred with an honorary PhD by the Karachi University in recognition of "matchless services to the country in the war on terror and particularly in restoring peace to the citizens of Karachi."

Controversially, the decision of conferring a PhD to Rehman Malik was criticized by the university's professors. The media also criticized the university's decision. Over this issue, the teachers society of Karachi University passed a unanimous resolution demanding the Governor of Sindh and the Vice Chancellor revoke the honorary doctorate degree.

=== FIA career ===
In 1973, Malik joined the National Alien Registration Authority (NARA) as the immigration agent and subsequently served in the various services of the intelligence community, working in various criminal offense cases. In the 1980s, allegedly on the recommendation of Chaudhry Zahoor Elahi, he joined the Federal Investigation Agency (FIA) as a special agent and initially investigated cases against KHAD's terrorist-sponsored operations in the country. Eventually he was appointed an Additional Director General of the FIA in 1993. His appointment was personally approved by Prime Minister Benazir Bhutto.

As Director of the FIA, Malik launched a secret war against the Islamist elements in Pakistan, which amounted to a direct attack on the Inter-Services Intelligence (ISI). His efforts equally dismayed the military establishment by reports of the FIA contacting the Israeli secret service, the Mossad, to investigate Islamist terrorists. The FIA leadership under Malik also angered Taliban supporters within the conservative establishment, because they allowed the extradition of Ramzi Yousef to the United States for trial on the 1993 World Trade Center bombing.

=== Removal from FIA and exile in UK ===
In the ending months of 1996, President Farooq Leghari exercised the constitutional option to dismiss his party's own government. One of the first acts of President Leghari, after dismissing Prime Minister Benazir Bhutto on 5 November 1996, was to imprison Ghulam Asghar, Director General of the FIA, on non-specified corruption charges. Malik, Additional Director General of FIA, was also arrested and remained in prison for one year. Later, he also survived assassination attempt.

Immediately, Malik was terminated from the FIA by Prime Minister Nawaz Sharif in 1997. In November 1998, Malik termed the termination of his service by Prime Minister Nawaz Sharif an "act of retaliation" because of the 200-page report, which he had sent to then-President Rafiq Tarar, disclosing large-scale corruption of the Sharif family. Malik then flew to London and made a corruption accusation against the Sharif brothers. With the dismissal of the government of the PPP, Malik left the country and settled in the United Kingdom, where he set up his own private security firm, DM Digital Network. Malik, serving at the capacity as firm's president, established its head office at Manchester. Through this firm, he assisted Benazir Bhutto during her exile, and he was her Chief of Security when she returned home in 2007.

During his nine-year-long exile in England, Malik obtained British citizenship. However, he stated that he gave up his British nationality in 2008 before holding public office.

=== PPP activism ===
Over his years in the United Kingdom, he grew closer to the elite central committee of the PPP. In 2007, he replaced Amin Fahim as the most trusted political aide of Benazir Bhutto, and was appointed the chief of security of Benazir Bhutto in 2007.

He became extremely known in public after breaking a "political deal" between Benazir Bhutto and Pervez Musharraf, which allowed Benazir Bhutto to return to the country. Earlier in 2002, Fahim had formed the extension of PPP (although later merged it) and acted as the leader of PPP in the absence of Benazir and her husband Asif Ali Zardari.

It was also reported in The News International that after Malik took over the role of top "adviser and broker" of Benazir on important matters ranging from politics to business, Fahim seemed to have become an "obsolete political commodity."

=== September 2014 PIA incident ===
On 15 September 2014, angry passengers at a domestic flight forced Rehman from boarding a Pakistan International Airlines plane, after the plane reportedly waited for over two hours for the former minister. The passengers refused to let him on board, and a verbal altercation occurred, resulting in the denial of Malik's boarding.

== Interior Minister (2008—2013) ==
After PPP formed the Federal Government following the 2008 general elections, Malik was appointed an "adviser on interior, intelligence, and narcotics control" by Prime Minister Yousaf Gillani. However, he was upgraded to Interior Minister on 27 April 2009, in Prime Minister Gillani's cabinet, prior to becoming senator.

Malik was an Interior Minister during the penultimate times in the history of the country. In a research analysis printed in Dawn newspaper, his stint as Interior Minister was criticized over the issues of target killings in Sindh and the security aftermath of the Afghanistan war. Interior Minister Malik has offered a $1 million bounty for the capture of Ehsanullah Ehsan (Isanullah Isan), the Pakistani Taliban spokesman who had attempted to try and justify the shocking October 2012 attempted assassination (and further threats on the life) of the 14-year-old Pakistani female blogger Malala Yousafzai (Yousafzai), a native of the Mingora region of the Swat Valley who had campaigned for the human and educational rights of girls and women in Pakistan and beyond, to international acclaim. The Taliban claimed to have acted not because of her work for education, but mainly because she was a Western spy who had broken Sharia law by opposing the mujahedeen – now used as a term for the Taliban and related militant groups – in their 'war' against the West; Malala is being treated in England for her injuries, and the Taliban's sources of motivation are disputed.

Interior Minister Malik also offered a pardon to the Pakistani Taliban's leader, Hakimullah Mehsud, if he fully renounced terrorism.

=== Court suspension ===
The Constitution bars a foreign national (or dual nationality holder) from holding any public office of the Government of Pakistan. The Supreme Court of Pakistan retroactively suspended and terminated the electoral membership of Farahnaz Ispahani over the issue of dual nationality on 25 May 2012.

In a reference filed against Malik, the Supreme Court began the hearings against Malik over the suspicion of his British nationality. Effectively, the Chief Justice Iftikhar Chaudhry suspended the electoral membership of Malik when he had shown reluctance to submit a declaration by the United Kingdom's Border Agency to establish that his client had surrendered British nationality on 6 June 2012. Despite the Supreme Court's verdict, he was reinstated by Prime Minister Gillani after issuing directives to the cabinet division to reinstate him as an advisor to the prime minister on interior affairs.

On 5 October 2012, Malik informed the Supreme Court that he renounced his British citizenship on 25 March 2008.

=== Resignation ===
Shortly after the verdict, Malik tendered his resignation to the Senate to Chairman Senate on 10 July 2012. He continued his work with the Ministry of Interior at the behest of Prime Minister Pervez Ashraf.

On 4 June, his membership in the Senate was suspended by the Supreme Court for being a dual national. This resulted in the loss of his position as the Interior Minister, because Article 63-A of the Constitution of Pakistan requires each member of the cabinet to be a member of the Parliament. On 10 July 2012, Malik resigned from the Senate.

=== National Reconciliation Ordinance ===
In 2007 the case of alleged corruption against Malik was dropped under the amnesty of the National Reconciliation Ordinance. However, the Anti Corruption court issued Arrest Warrants for Rehman Malik in December 2009.

== Death ==
Malik contracted COVID-19, which led to complications in his lungs. He was admitted to the intensive care unit at Shifa Medical hospital for treatment on 1 February 2022, and was put on ventilator. Malik died on the morning of 23 February 2022, at the age of 70.

Political offices
| Preceded by Hamid Nawaz Khan | Interior Minister of Pakistan; 2008–2013 | Succeeded by Malik Habib |
