= Muhammad Javed Ikhlas =

Pakistani politician

- محمد جاوید اخلاص

Member of the National Assembly of Pakistan
- In office 1 June 2013 – 31 May 2018
- Preceded by: Raja Pervaiz Ashraf
- Succeeded by: Raja Pervaiz Ashraf
- Constituency: NA-51 (Rawalpindi-II)

Member of the Provincial Assembly of Punjab
- In office 1985–1999
- Constituency: PP-11 (Rawalpindi)

Personal details
- Born: 5 October 1955 (age 71)
- Other political affiliations: PMLN (2013-2025)

Raja Muhammad Javed Ikhlas (Urdu: راجہ محمد جاوید اخلاص, born 5 October 1955) is a Pakistani politician who had been a member of the National Assembly of Pakistan, from June 2013 to May 2018. Previously, he had been a member of the Provincial Assembly of Punjab from 1985 to 1999.

== Early life ==
He was born on 5 October 1955 in Tehsil Gujar Khan, District Rawalpindi.

== Political career ==
He was elected to the Provincial Assembly of Punjab from Constituency PP-11 (Rawalpindi) for the first time in the 1985 Pakistani general election.

He was re-elected to the Provincial Assembly of Punjab from Constituency PP-11 (Rawalpindi) as a candidate of Islami Jamhoori Ittehad (IJI) in the 1988 Pakistani general election and served as Parliamentary Secretary for Forestry, Wildlife and Fisheries.

He was re-elected to the Provincial Assembly of Punjab from Constituency PP-11 (Rawalpindi) as a candidate of IJI for the third time in the 1990 Pakistani general election and served as Parliamentary Secretary for Housing, Physical and Environmental Planning and Development.

He was re-elected to the Provincial Assembly of Punjab from Constituency PP-11 (Rawalpindi) as a candidate of Pakistan Muslim League (N) (PML-N) for the fourth time in the 1993 Pakistani general election.

He was re-elected to the Provincial Assembly of Punjab from Constituency PP-11 (Rawalpindi) as a candidate of PML (N) for the fifth time in the 1997 Pakistani general election.

He joined Pakistan Muslim League (Q) (PML-Q) in 2001.

He was elected as Nazim of Rawalpindi in 2005. He later also served as District Naib Nazim of Rawalpindi.

He was elected to the National Assembly of Pakistan as a candidate of PML-N from Constituency NA-51 (Rawalpindi-II) in the 2013 Pakistani general election. In 2014, he was appointed as Federal Parliamentary Secretary for Cabinet Secretariat, Establishment and Capital Administration and Development Division.
