= Malik Habib =

Pakistani politician

Minister of Interior (caretaker)
- In office 3 April 2013 – 4 June 2013
- President: Asif Zardari
- Prime Minister: Mir Hazar Khoso
- Preceded by: Rehman Malik
- Succeeded by: Nisar Ali Khan

Malik Muhammad Habib Khan (Urdu: ملک محمد حبیب خان) is a Pakistani civil servant who served as caretaker Minister of Interior and Narcotics from April to June 2013.

== Career ==
Khan was the Inspector General of Balochistan Police from 30 November 1998 to 27 November 1999. According to reports, he was appointed to this position by the Pakistan Muslim League (N) (PML-N) government but was removed by General Pervez Musharraf following the 1999 Pakistani coup d'état.

During 2003-2004, he served as the Managing Director of Pakistan Tourism Development Corporation.

On 3 April 2013, he was inducted into the caretaker federal cabinet of Prime Minister Mir Hazar Khan Khoso as Caretaker Federal Minister for Interior and Narcotics, serving in that role until 4 June 2013. Following Khan's pro-PML-N comments during his tenure as Caretaker Minister, major political parties such as Pakistan People’s Party (PPP, Muttahida Qaumi Movement – Pakistan and Pakistan Tehreek-e-Insaf labeled him as "controversial" and demanded his resignation. The PPP also decided to file a reference against him in the Election Commission of Pakistan regarding his dismissal. According to reports, Khan stated that Nawaz Sharif, leader of the PML-N, "was the only real leader" in the country.

Political offices
Preceded by Rehman Malik	Minister of the Interior; 2013	Succeeded by Nisar Ali Khan
