= Rehmat Shah Afridi =

Pakistani journalist (died 2023)

- Born: 1955; North-West Frontier Province, (present day Khyber Pakhtunkhwa), Pakistan
- Died: 9 December 2023 (aged 65) peshawer, pakistan
- Occupation: Journalist
- Known for: Being the founder of The Frontier Post
- Children: 6

Rehmat Shah Afridi (1955 – 9 December 2023) was a Pakistani journalist and the founder of The Frontier Post, an English language daily newspaper in Pakistan.

== Career ==
Afridi established The Frontier Post in 1985, which was recognized for its independent journalism and coverage of important events in Pakistan and the region. Afridi faced many risks, including a death sentence, but succeeded in creating influence on Pakistani journalism. The newspaper is distinguished as the first, and potentially the only, national English newspaper originating from Khyber Pakhtunkhwa, and it has gained both national and international acclaim.

== Works ==
Afridi reportedly wrote a book called Black Sheep, which allegedly exposed corrupt people in Pakistan. He did not publish the book to protect his children from possible harm.

== Legal issues ==
Afridi faced legal challenges when he was sentenced to death in June 2000 on drug charges, later commuted to life imprisonment by the Lahore High Court, a decision upheld by the Supreme Court. In May 2008 he was released on parole.

== Personal life and death ==
Rahmat Shah Afridi was a father of six. He died on 9 December 2023, at the age of 65.
