= Mir Hazar Khan Khosa =

Pakistani jurist and politician (1929–2021)

- مير ہزار خان کھوسو
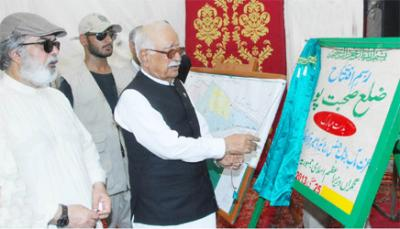
- Khan Khosa at the Inauguration of the Sohbatpur District in May 2013

Caretaker Prime Minister of Pakistan
- In office 25 March 2013 – 5 June 2013
- President: Asif Ali Zardari
- Preceded by: Raja Pervaiz Ashraf
- Succeeded by: Nawaz Sharif

Minister of Foreign Affairs
- In office 4 April 2013 – 4 June 2013
- Preceded by: Hina Rabbani Khar
- Succeeded by: Nawaz Sharif

Minister of Finance Caretaker
- In office 4 April 2013 – 4 June 2013
- Preceded by: Saleem Mandviwalla
- Succeeded by: Ishaq Dar

Minister of Defence Caretaker
- In office 5 April 2013 – 4 June 2013
- Preceded by: Naveed Qamar
- Succeeded by: Nawaz Sharif

Chief Justice of the Federal Shariat Court
- In office 17 November 1992 – 18 July 1994

Personal details
- Born: 30 September 1929 Goth Azam Khan, Sibi District, Balochistan, British India
- Died: 21 June 2021 (aged 91) Quetta, Balochistan, Pakistan
- Cause of death: Myocardial infarction
- Party: Independent
- Education: University of Sindh; University of Karachi

Mir Hazar Khan Khosa (Urdu: میر ہزار خان کھوسہ) (30 September 1929 – 26 June 2021) was a Pakistani jurist who served as the caretaker prime minister of Pakistan from 25 March to 5 June 2013 for the 2013 general elections. Khoso was previously a judge who served as a chief justice of the Federal Shariat Court.

== Early life and education ==
Khosa was born in Goth Azam Khan village in the Jaffarabad District of the South-East Balochistan Province of Pakistan, on 30 September 1929. During his youth, Khosa participated actively in the Pakistan Movement and noted Jinnah as his inspiration. He was of Baloch ethnicity.

Khosa attended the Sindh University in 1950 and graduated with BA degree in 1954. After two years, Khosa secured a bachelor's degree in law from Karachi University. He was public prosecutor at Jacobabad, Sindh from 1966 to 1976. He was a professor in Government at Law College Quetta, Balochistan. He was also selected as a judge of the Supreme Court Pakistan from 1994 to 1996. He was also a member of Pakistan Public Service Commission from 1986 to 2001. He was chairman of the Sacked Employees Board for reinstatement.

== Judicial career ==
Khosa began his professional career in 1957 as a lawyer of then West Pakistan Karachi Bench and then became a Supreme Court lawyer in 1980. He was chosen to become a judge at Balochistan High Court in 1977 and served in that position for the next two years. He was reappointed an additional judge in March 1985 and was confirmed as a permanent judge of the provincial high court in 1987. He was elevated as the chief justice of Balochistan High Court in 1989. He was appointed Governor of Balochistan twice but for brief periods. Firstly, he governed the province from 25 June until 12 July in 1990, and then from 13 March 1991 until 13 July in 1991.

After reaching superannuation and thus retirement from the judicial services, Khoso was appointed a judge of the Federal Shariat Court that rules according to Islamic injunction. After assuming his new responsibilities in 1991, the next year he was promoted as the chief justice of the Shariat Court and continued to be in this position till 1994. Khosa served as the Balochistan Chairman of the Zakat Council. For a long time, Khosa steered clear of politics, focusing mainly on his responsibilities at the Zakat Council. Due to his efforts, his home-district (Jaffarabad) has two Session Courts. Khosa fought for rights for females to become educated.

== Prime Minister of Pakistan ==
The Election Commission of Pakistan (ECP) appointed Khosa as the caretaker Prime Minister of Pakistan on 24 March 2013, out of four nominees coming from both the opposition and the dissolved government. He took oath on 25 March 2013.

=== Policies and changes ===
As a caretaker, Khosa held little power and was only tasked by the Election Commission to hold elections within a few months. As the caretaker prime minister he did make administrative adjustments including the inauguration of the Sohbatpur District, a small district in Balochistan. He served his tenure as a caretaker and ensured elections were held in June of 2013.

=== Federal cabinet ===
On 2 April 2013, the fourteen-member caretaker federal cabinet, as nominated by Khoso, took their oath administered by President Asif Ali Zardari at the Aiwan-e-Sadr in Islamabad. Among the ministers sworn in included Arif Nizami, Sohail Wajahat H Siddique, Shahzada Ahsan Ashraf Sheikh, Malik Habib, Ahmer Bilal Soofi, Dr Musaddiq Malik, Maqbool HH Rahmatoola, Abdul Malik Kasi, Asadullah Mandokhel, Mir Hassan Domki, Dr Sania Nishtar, Feroze Jamal Shah Kakakhel, Dr Younis Soomro and Shahzada Jamal. The interim cabinet included seven members from the Punjab, three each from Sindh and Balochistan, and two from Khyber Pakhtunkhwa. The Khoso caretaker ministry served till the Third Sharif ministry took office after general elections in May 2013.

== Personal life and death ==
Khosa died on 26 June 2021 at the age of 91.

== See also ==
- Election Commission of Pakistan

Political offices
| Preceded by Raja Pervaiz Ashraf | Prime Minister of Pakistan; Caretaker; 2013 | Succeeded by Nawaz Sharif |
| Preceded by Hina Rabbani Khar | Minister of Foreign Affairs; Caretaker; 2013 | Succeeded by Sartaj Aziz |
| Preceded by Saleem Mandviwalla | Minister of Finance; Caretaker; 2013 | Succeeded by Ishaq Dar |
| Preceded by Naveed Qamar | Minister of Defence; Caretaker; 2013 | Succeeded by Nisar Ali Khan |
