= Chaudhry Muhammad Riaz =

Pakistani politician

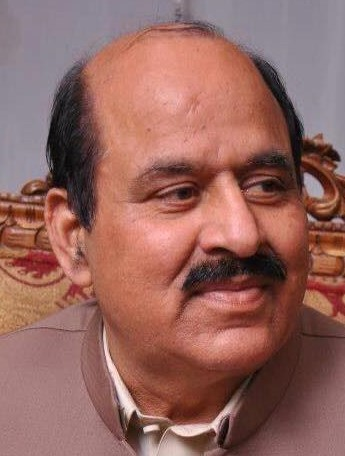
- Born: Chaudhry Muhammad Riaz; Gujar Khan, Punjab, Pakistan,
- Occupations: Politician, social worker
- Political party: PTI (2026-present

Chaudhry Muhammad Riaz was born in Gujar Khan, belongs to an influential and respectable family and he is one of the founding member of Pakistan Muslim League (N). He has been elected several times as member of the National Assembly of Pakistan and MPA. He has served as a provincial minister twice. His tenure is from 1985 to 1999. In the 2008 election Raja Pervaiz Ashraf (PPP) won the election who was also contesting on the same seat as Chaudhry Riaz. He is the brother of Chaudhry Khurshid Zaman PML(N) MNA of 1997. Chaudhry Muhammad Riaz has served as a minister twice, and so has his brother. He stayed in power for 14 years, continuing his ancestral status.

On 30 September 2020, Chaudhry Muhammad Riaz was handed a 10-year jail sentence along with a fine of 50 million rupees by National Accountability Bureau. However, later on he was acquitted on the said charges as the Court deemed them to be politically motivated and without any substance.

He is the brother in law of Chaudhry Muhammad Asghar (Pakistan Tehreek-e-Insaf nominated candidate for Rawalpindi) and established real estate developer and landlord of Pakistan.

== See also ==
- National Assembly of Pakistan
- Politics of Pakistan
