= Chakri Vakilan =

Coordinates: 33°11′N 73°16′E

Chakri Vakilan چکری وکِیلاں
- Village
- Location within Pakistan
- Country: Pakistan
- Province: Punjab (Pakistan)
- District: Rawalpindi
- Time zone: UTC+5 (PST)

Chakri Vakilan (Urdu: چکری وکِیلاں) is a village in Gujar Khan Tehsil, Rawalpindi District, Pakistan. The village is about 6 miles (9.7 km) from Gujar Khan.

== Etymology ==
The name Chakri comes from the Hindustani chakr, meaning "circle sitting".Vakilan comes from Vakil, meaning "a man who helps someone in arguing his case". So together the words mean "a panchiat, or jury, of Lords".
