= Ministry of Interior (Pakistan) =

Government ministry of Pakistan

Pakistan Ministry of Interior and Narcotics Control
- وزارت داخلہ و انسداد منشیات

Agency overview
- Formed: August 14, 1947; 79 years ago
- Jurisdiction: Federal Government of Pakistan
- Headquarters: Block R, Pak Secretariat Islamabad, Pakistan 44000
- Minister responsible: Mohsin Naqvi, Minister for Interior and Narcotics Control
- Agency executive: Ahmad Raza Sarwar, Interior Secretary
- Website: Official Website

The Ministry of Interior and Narcotics Control (Urdu: وزارتِ داخلہ, abbreviated as MoI) is a Cabinet-level ministry of the Government of Pakistan, tasked and primarily responsible for implementing the internal policies, state security, administration of internal affairs involving the state and affairs related to narcotics control.

The ministry is led by the Interior Minister, the Minister of State for Interior and the Interior Secretary. The Interior Secretary is a Grade 22 officer whereas the Interior Minister is a leading member of the federal cabinet.

On 11 February 2025, Narcotics Control ministry was merged in to Ministry of Interior as an attached department/wing of ministry and now it is called Ministry of Interior and Narcotics Control.

The minister is required to be a member of parliament. During the martial regimes of Generals Ayub Khan and Yahya Khan, from 1962 until 1971, the Interior Minister was called Home Affairs Minister.

== Organisation ==
- Minister of Interior
  - Minister of State for Interior
  - Secretary of Interior
    - Additional Secretary I
      - Joint Secretary Administration
      - Joint Secretary Political
    - Additional Secretary II
      - Joint Secretary Information & Communication Technology
      - Joint Secretary Civil Armed Forces
    - Additional Secretary III
      - Joint Secretary Immigration & Nationality
      - Joint Secretary Legal Affairs

== Agencies ==
=== Directorate General of Civil Defence ===
The Directorate General of Civil Defence provides civil defence and emergency services.

=== Immigration & Passports ===
Deals with all the issues of Pakistani citizenship, Passports and Visas.

=== Federal Investigation Agency ===
A border control, criminal investigation, counter-intelligence and security agency under the control of the Interior Secretary of Pakistan.

=== National Academy for Prisons Administration (NAPA) ===
Federal Government's training institute for prison staff of all four provinces of Pakistan.

=== National Counter Terrorism Authority (NACTA) ===
Domestic counterterrorism Authority of Pakistan.

=== National Cyber Crime Investigation Agency (NCCIA) ===
Specialized agency to investigate cyber crime within the country.

=== National Database and Registration Authority (NADRA) ===
NADRA regulates government databases and statistically manages the sensitive registration database of all the national citizens of Pakistan.

=== National Police Academy of Pakistan ===
National Police Academy of Pakistan is a federal training centre for the senior officers of the civilian law enforcement agencies of Pakistan.

== List of Interior ==
N°	Interior minister		Term of office		
N°	Portrait	Name	Took office	Left office	Time in office
1		Fazl-ur-Rehman	August 15, 1947	May 8, 1948	267 days
2		Khwaja Shahabuddin	May 8, 1948	November 26, 1951	3 years, 202 days
3	Portrait of Mushtaq Ahmad Gurmani	Mushtaq Ahmad Gurmani	November 26, 1951	October 24, 1954	2 years, 332 days
4	Portrait of Iskander Ali Mirza	Iskander Ali Mirza	October 24, 1954	August 7, 1955	287 days
5	Portrait of A. K. Fazlul Huq	A. K. Fazlul Huq	August 11, 1955	March 9, 1956	211 days
6	Portrait of Abdus Sattar	Abdus Sattar	March 17, 1956	September 12, 1956	179 days
7		Mir Ghulam Ali Talpur	September 12, 1956	March 18, 1958	1 year, 187 days
8	Portrait of Jalal-ud-din Jalal Baba	Jalal-ud-din Jalal Baba	March 18, 1958	October 14, 1958	210 days
9	Portrait of K. M. Sheikh	K. M. Sheikh	October 15, 1958	June 13, 1960	1 year, 242 days
10	Portrait of Zakir Husain	Zakir Husain	June 14, 1960	June 8, 1962	1 year, 359 days
11	Portrait of Khan Habibullah Khan Marwat	Khan Habibullah Khan Marwat	June 13, 1962	March 23, 1965	2 years, 283 days
12	Portrait of Ayub Khan	Ayub Khan	March 23, 1965	August 17, 1965	147 days
13		Chaudhry Ali Akbar Khan	August 17, 1965	November 30, 1966	1 year, 105 days
14		Afzal Rahman Khan	December 5, 1966	March 25, 1969	2 years, 110 days
15	Portrait of Abdul Hamid Khan	Abdul Hamid Khan	April 15, 1969	August 3, 1969	110 days
16		Sardar Abdur Rashid Khan	August 4, 1969	February 22, 1971	1 year, 202 days
–	Vacant		February 22, 1971	December 16, 1971	297 days
17	Portrait of Zulfikar Ali Bhutto	Zulfikar Ali Bhutto	December 16, 1971	May 1, 1972	137 days
18		Abdul Qayyum Khan	May 13, 1972	January 13, 1977	4 years, 245 days
19	Portrait of Zulfikar Ali Bhutto	Zulfikar Ali Bhutto	January 13, 1977	March 28, 1977	74 days
–	Vacant		March 28, 1977	January 14, 1978	292 days
20		Inamul Haque Khan	January 14, 1978	July 5, 1978	172 days
21	Portrait of Mahmoud Haroon	Mahmoud Haroon	July 5, 1978	November 18, 1984	6 years, 136 days
22	Portrait of F. S. Lodhi	F. S. Lodhi	January 22, 1985	March 23, 1985	60 days
23	Portrait of Muhammad Khan Junejo	Muhammad Khan Junejo	April 10, 1985	May 21, 1985	41 days
24		Aslam Khattak	May 22, 1985	March 29, 1987	1 year, 311 days
25	Portrait of Wasim Sajjad	Wasim Sajjad	March 29, 1987	July 28, 1987	121 days
26		Malik Naseem Ahmed Aheer	July 28, 1987	December 4, 1988	1 year, 129 days
27	Portrait of Aitzaz Ahsan	Aitzaz Ahsan	December 4, 1988	August 6, 1990	1 year, 245 days
28		Mian Zahid Sarfraz (caretaker)	August 11, 1990	November 6, 1990	87 days
29	Portrait of Chaudhry Shujaat Hussain	Chaudhry Shujaat Hussain	November 9, 1990	July 18, 1993	2 years, 251 days
30		Fateh Khan Bandial (caretaker)	July 23, 1993	October 19, 1993	88 days
31		Naseerullah Babar	October 21, 1993	November 5, 1996	3 years, 15 days
32		Omar Afridi (caretaker)	November 5, 1996	February 17, 1997	104 days
33	Portrait of Chaudhry Shujaat Hussain	Chaudhry Shujaat Hussain	February 25, 1997	October 12, 1999	2 years, 229 days
34		Moinuddin Haider	November 6, 1999	November 23, 2002	3 years, 17 days
35		Faisal Saleh Hayat	November 23, 2002	August 25, 2004	1 year, 276 days
36	Portrait of Aftab Ahmad Sherpao	Aftab Ahmad Sherpao	August 25, 2004	November 15, 2007	3 years, 82 days
37	Portrait of Hamid Nawaz Khan	Hamid Nawaz Khan (caretaker)	November 16, 2007	March 25, 2008	130 days
38	Portrait of Rehman Malik	Rehman Malik	March 25, 2008	March 16, 2013	4 years, 356 days
39		Malik Habib Khan (caretaker)	April 2, 2013	June 5, 2013	64 days
40	Portrait of Nisar Ali Khan	Nisar Ali Khan	June 7, 2013	July 27, 2017	4 years, 50 days
41	Portrait of Ahsan Iqbal	Ahsan Iqbal	August 4, 2017	May 31, 2018	300 days
42		Azam Suleman Khan (caretaker)	June 5, 2018	August 18, 2018	74 days
43	Portrait of Imran Khan	Imran Khan	August 18, 2018	April 18, 2019	243 days
44	Portrait of Ijaz Shah	Ijaz Shah	April 18, 2019	December 12, 2020	1 year, 238 days
45	Portrait of Sheikh Rasheed Ahmad	Sheikh Rasheed Ahmad	December 12, 2020	April 10, 2022	1 year, 119 days
46	Portrait of Rana Sanaullah	Rana Sanaullah	April 19, 2022	August 10, 2023	1 year, 113 days
47		Sarfraz Bugti (caretaker)	August 17, 2023	December 16, 2023	121 days
48		Gohar Ejaz (caretaker)	December 20, 2023	March 10, 2024	81 days
49	Portrait of Mohsin Naqvi	Mohsin Naqvi	March 11, 2024	Incumbent	2 years, 225 days

== See also ==
- Constitution of Pakistan
- President of Pakistan
- Prime Minister of Pakistan
- Defence Minister of Pakistan
- Foreign Minister of Pakistan
- Finance Minister of Pakistan
- Police Service of Pakistan
- Civil Defense of Pakistan
