= Jodhra =

Jodhra (Punjabi: جودھڑا) is Punjabi Rajput tribe native to Pindi Gheb and Talagang tehsils in Punjab, Pakistan.

The Mughal ruler Babur mentions two tribes of common origin, the Jodh and Janjua, inhabiting the Salt Range during the 16th century in his Baburnama. According to Agha Hussain Hamdani Jodh may represent the modern Jodhra tribe.
