= Feroze Jamal Shah Kakakhel =

Pakistani politician

Khyber Pakhtunkhwa Minister for Information and Tourism
- Incumbent
- Assumed office 2023

Federal Minister, Government of Pakistan
- In office ?–?

Personal details
- Education: Lincoln's Inn, Cardiff University

Feroze Jamal Shah Kakakhel is a Pakistani politician. Kakakhel has held several positions throughout his career, including serving as the acting Federal Minister for the Government of Pakistan. Currently, he is serving as acting Minister for Information and Tourism in Khyber Pakhtunkhwa.

== Controversies ==
Feroze Jamal Shah Kakakhil is facing allegations of corruption and misappropriation of funds during his tenure as the Federal Caretaker Minister of Overseas Pakistanis.
