= Raja Pervez Ashraf =

Pakistani politician (born 1950)

- راجہ پرویز اشرف
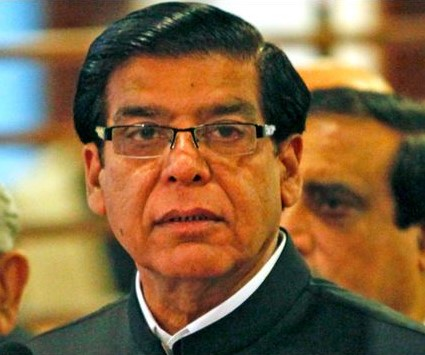
- Ashraf in 2013

19th Speaker of the National Assembly of Pakistan
- In office 16 April 2022 – 1 March 2024
- Deputy: Zahid Akram Durrani
- Preceded by: Asad Qaiser
- Succeeded by: Ayaz Sadiq

17th Prime Minister of Pakistan
- In office 22 June 2012 – 24 March 2013
- President: Asif Ali Zardari
- Deputy: Chaudhry Pervaiz Elahi
- Preceded by: Yusuf Raza Gilani
- Succeeded by: Mir Hazar Khan Khoso

Minister for Water and Power
- In office 31 March 2008 – 9 February 2011
- Prime Minister: Yusuf Raza Gilani
- Preceded by: Liaquat Ali Jatoi
- Succeeded by: Naveed Qamar

Member of the National Assembly of Pakistan
- Incumbent
- Assumed office 29 February 2024
- Constituency: NA-52 Rawalpindi-I
- In office 13 August 2018 – 10 August 2023
- Constituency: NA-58 (Rawalpindi-II)
- In office 2008–2013
- Constituency: NA-51 Rawalpindi-II

Personal details
- Born: 26 December 1950 (age 75) Sanghar, Sindh, Pakistan
- Party: PPP (1990–present)
- Spouse: Nusrat Pervez Ashraf
- Children: 4
- Education: University of Sindh
- Occupation: Agriculturist, businessman, Politician

Raja Pervez Ashraf (Note: Urdu: راجہ پرویز اشرف;) (born 26 December 1950) is a Pakistani politician, businessman and agriculturist who served as the 17th prime minister of Pakistan from June 2012 to March 2013 and as the Speaker of the National Assembly from April 2022 to March 2024. Ashraf was a member of the National Assembly of Pakistan from NA-58 (Rawalpindi-II). He has also served as the Senior Vice President of the Pakistan Democratic Movement (PDM), an alliance of political parties opposed to Imran Khan's PTI party.

Prior to being elevated as prime minister, he served as the Minister for Water and Power in the Yousaf Raza Gillani-led government from March 2008 to February 2011. A senior-ranking leader in the Pakistan Peoples Party (PPP) from Rawalpindi District, Ashraf assumed premiership on 22 June 2012 after Yousaf Raza Gillani was disqualified over contempt of court charges. Shortlisted by the PPP as a candidate for the post, he was eventually elected based on a 211–89 vote in the National Assembly.

Tackling the corruption scandals, one of the major achievements during his premiership was his interest to develop and implement hydro projects in particular the 970-MW Neelum-Jhelum project. The project had received a big jolt when the Chinese Exim Bank refused to release a $448 million loan linking it to the restoration of the Safe City Project in Islamabad which was stopped by the Supreme Court of Pakistan. During his tenure Water and Power Development Authority (WAPDA) launched a number of mega and medium-sized projects in Gilgit–Baltistan.

== Early life ==
Raja Pervez Ashraf was born to a Punjabi Muslim family on 26 December 1950 in Sanghar, Sindh. Ashraf belongs to the Minhas Rajput clan of Pakhral and is originally from Gujar Khan, an industrial town in the Rawalpindi District of the Potohar region in northern Punjab. The Potohar region is home to numerous prominent political and military personalities. Ashraf comes from a middle class Punjabi speaking family of landowners who have had a traditional background in politics. An uncle of his served as a minister in the cabinet of Ayub Khan during the 1960s. His parents owned agricultural land in the town of Sanghar in Sindh, where he was born and brought up.

He graduated from the University of Sindh in 1970 and was involved in agriculture before entering politics. He is married to Nusrat Pervez Ashraf and has four children, which include two sons and two daughters. Ashraf is multilingual and can fluently speak English, Urdu, Punjabi and Sindhi.

== Early political career ==
He is regarded as an important PPP loyalist and leader in the Rawalpindi region. He contested parliamentary elections in 1990, 1993 and 1997. He won in elections held in 2002 and then in 2008, following which he was appointed as federal minister for water, and as power minister in the cabinet of Prime Minister Yousaf Raza Gillani.

=== Member of Parliament ===
Ashraf has been twice elected Member of the National Assembly of Pakistan (MNA) from his constituency of Gujar Khan, Rawalpindi District. He won re-election in the February 2008 elections. During his time as an MNA, he served as a member of the Standing Committee on Kashmir and the Standing Committee on Law, Justice and Human Rights. Before his ascendance to the post of prime minister, he was also the secretary general of the PPP.

=== Water and Power ministry ===
He became the head of the Water and Power Ministry in the coalition government of PPP, PML-N, ANP, JUI-F and MQM formed after the 2008 elections. During his tenure as power minister, there was a chronic shortage of electricity generation throughout the country and power cuts (load shedding) remained frequent. In the position, he faced heavy criticism for repeatedly promising the country's power crisis would be over "by 2008" as the country suffered regular blackouts. He became one of the most sought after ministers in the National Assembly, by legislators who demanded answers for the power crisis. According to a report on his parliamentary performance, the water and power ministry while Ashraf was in-charge received as many as 1,147 official questions and queries, of which only 60% were responded to.

The report opined that Ashraf's performance as minister was "tainted by failures to overcome the power shortfall that continued to aggravate even after he was replaced" and that his actions and responses both inside and outside the National Assembly had "not been translated into actions". Nevertheless, about 3,570 megawatts of power was added to the national grid during the PPP government, a major portion of which came during Ashraf's term in office. His term is said to have overseen relatively more megawatts being added to the national grid when compared to other ministers of power and energy since Benazir Bhutto's last government. He was accused of receiving kickbacks in the rental power projects, and of using illegal money to buy foreign property. Ashraf denied the charges, and as of June 2012, was defending himself before the Supreme Court. No official charges have been framed against him as no evidence could be presented so far.

One of the main reasons for power crisis, which have never received due attention and focus is the circular debt and which continued to increase over the years. The government has time and again tried to clear the circular debt, however it comes again. This is because of the structural issues including power theft, poor recovery from other government departments, difference between cost of generation and actual cost charged to customer. During Ashraf's government prioritised hydro power projects in particular Neelum Jhelum 970 MW. During his term, WAPDA initiated several hydro projects in Gilgit Baltistan (GB) including the Satpara Dam having 17 MW power generation capacity and 0.093 million acre feetwater storage capacity and Diamer-Bhasha Dam having 4,500 MW power generation capacity and 8.1 million acre feet water storage capacity, along with hydropower projects of 7,100 MW Bunji, 34 MW Harpo, 80 MW Phandar and 40 MW Basho.

Hydro power is the cheapest energy source and as Minister and PM he gave special attention, however hydro power projects take long time to complete and the electricity from the projects will be available after 10 years. To resolve short term energy crisis, Ashraf implemented power project on rental basis, following the rental policy approved in Mushrrafs tenure. However the projects became controversial.

== Premiership (2012–2013) ==
On 26 April 2012, Prime Minister Yusuf Raza Gilani was convicted of being in contempt of court for refusing to bring charges against President Asif Ali Zardari. On 19 June 2012, Gillani was retroactively ruled ineligible to hold the office by the Supreme Court. The ruling Pakistan People's Party nominated textile minister Makhdoom Shahabuddin to replace Gillani, but the nomination failed when the Anti-Narcotics Force issued a warrant for Shahabuddin's arrest on drug charges. Ashraf was then selected as the party's next option.

On 22 June 2012, Raja Pervez Ashraf was elected Prime Minister of Pakistan Ashraf and his cabinet were sworn in on the same day. His selection as Prime Minister restored the country's government after several days of turmoil where officially the country was without a government. The Associated Press said Ashraf's election was "unlikely to calm the tensions roiling the country" and noted that many observers expected him to eventually be ousted like his predecessor. Political analyst Raza Rumi said Ashraf was likely chosen by the PPP because they knew he would not last long. On 24 July 2012, the government informed the Supreme Court, one day before expiry of the court's deadline, that it had not taken a decision on reopening of the graft cases against President Zardari.

←2008	22 June 2012	2013→
Candidate	Party	Votes Obtained
Required majority →		172 out of 342
Raja Pervez Ashraf	PPP	211
Mehtab Abbasi	PMLN	89
Abstentions		<42

Immediately after his election, Ashraf said that the economy, inflation, and the country's power crisis would be his top concerns. "Our country cannot afford politics of confrontation at this time," he said. Within 24 hours of being elected, Ashraf held a meeting to resolve the energy crisis in the country and directed the Ministry of Petroleum to ensure the supply of 28,000 tonnes of fuel daily to power plants, so as to add 1200 mega watts to the national grid system. There were power protests erupting throughout the country for continual load shedding. The Pakistan Economy Watch (PEW) was critical of this renewed focus on energy, calling it a "useless effort" with the president of PEW, Murtaza Mughal, remarking that load shedding had only "increased in the harrowing summer", making life difficult for the ordinary citizen; Mughal further noted that the announcement of adding more fuel into independent power producers had been portrayed positively, despite the fact that the actual problem did not lie in scarcity of fuel but rather in non-payment of dues. Businesspeople and economists in Pakistan had a mixed response to Ashraf's appointment; while some appreciated the prime minister's focus on the energy crisis and hoped for greater cooperation between key institutions and political parties as being good for economic stability, others questioned his reputation related to rental power and expressed anxiety over the government's ongoing clash with the judiciary which could cause uncertainty and scare businesses away. A government official praised the smooth transition of power and said that the country's economic policy would stay the same, adding that the government's economic team will carry on with implementing the budget and other economic functions as present before Gillani's disqualification.

As an initiative to overcome the energy crises, Ashraf announced his intention to build several small dams across the country. He said that these projects would start from his native Potohar plateau, as part of a development programme for the Potohar region. Apart from energy, he identified the deteriorating law and order situation of Karachi, especially with regards to target killings, as a second major challenge.

In September 2012, during his maiden trip to Gilgit-Baltistan, Ashraf announced a Rs. 2 billion development package for the region.

On 12 July 2012, The Supreme Court in its NRO implementation case order has ruled that Prime Minister Raja Pervez Ashraf must write the letter to Swiss authorities to reopen graft cases against President Asif Ali Zardari.

On 25 July 2012, The Supreme Court gave Raja Pervez Ashraf to 8 August 2012 to implement its order by writing a letter to Swiss authorities to reopen graft cases against President Asif Ali Zradari.

On 8 August 2012, the supreme court adjourned the hearing till 18 September 2012.

Three days after his election, Ashraf visited Nine Zero and met with leaders of the Muttahida Qaumi Movement in Karachi. He also visited the leader of the Pakistan Muslim League (F). The visits were seen as part of a fresh move to reaffirm ties with coalition political parties. The first significant milestone Ashraf performed after taking charge of his office was an approval for the creation of a post of Deputy Prime Minister of Pakistan to fulfill a demand of the coalition party Pakistan Muslim League (Q) (PML-Q). The post was inaugurated on 25 June and Chaudhry Pervez Elahi of PML-Q was appointed as the first deputy prime minister of the country. However, the position is largely symbolic and has no legal constitutional duties.

On 27 June 2012, the Supreme Court of Pakistan gave prime minister Ashraf two weeks to indicate whether he would ask Swiss authorities to reopen corruption cases against president Zardari. However, Ashraf stated that his position on the issue was no different from that of previous prime minister Gillani. In the first week of July, he directed attention on the Balochistan conflict and called for a high-level meeting to discuss the issue of missing persons in the province. In the first week of July, Ashraf announced the government's plans to establish legislation which would remove the bar on dual nationality holders from contesting in elections. If passed, the legislation would enable Overseas Pakistanis holding dual nationalities eligible to participate in elections and hold public office. The enforcement of such a legislation remains a controversial issue. He made a visit to Peshawar a few days later, where he met local politicians, during which he expressed his views on the parliament being "the mother of all institutions". He has praised the role of democracy in creating an "independent media, judiciary and parliament." He further paid tribute to the Pakistan Army in its role in the War on Terror and military operations in the troubled northwestern areas.

In the fraud case against Asif Ali Zardari, he indicated in September 2012 that he would be willing to open the pending fraud cases.

When commenting on foreign policy after assuming premiership, Ashraf said that he wanted to deal with the United States on "an equal footing". However, he will likely have to deal with the court's demands to charge Zardari before doing much else. Prime Minister Manmohan Singh of India congratulated Ashraf shortly after his election, and anticipated greater progress in bilateral relations between the two countries during Ashraf's term. The Chinese government greeted Ashraf and pledged closer ties with Pakistan to strengthen their "all-weather friendship". Other notable messages of congratulation came from U.S. Secretary of State Hillary Clinton and Afghan president Hamid Karzai.

On 24 June 2012, several Tehrik-i-Taliban militants from Afghanistan entered Pakistan's bordering tribal areas killing 13 Pakistani troops, of which seven were beheaded. During the conflict, Pakistani troops killed fourteen of the raiding militants. The attack, one of several such cross-border skirmishes, was strongly condemned with Raja Pervez Ashraf stating that the matter would be directly taken to Afghan president Hamid Karzai.

Regarding his stand on the Kashmir conflict with India, Ashraf has categorically stated that Pakistan would continue providing moral, political, and diplomatic support to the Kashmiri people of Jammu and Kashmir until a solution was to be reached for the issue in accordance with UN resolutions and Kashmiri aspirations.

Ashraf is expected to visit Kabul, Afghanistan, to hold talks with the Afghan leadership on the peace process in Afghanistan amidst the ongoing Afghan war and to discuss the status of Afghan-led reconciliation with the Afghan Taliban. The visit comes at a time when Pakistan's relations with the United States have improved in the aftermath of the 2011 NATO attack. On 15 July, he performed a two-day state visit to Saudi Arabia, his first official tour since becoming prime minister. During the visit, he would perform Umrah, meet with King Abdullah of Saudi Arabia, discuss the status of relations between Pakistan and Saudi Arabia and also meet members of the Pakistani community in Saudi Arabia.

On his visit to Kabul, Afghanistan, in late July 2012, Ashraf met with Karzai government officials and engaged in talks with the two main opposition leaders Abdullah Abdullah from the National Coalition of Afghanistan and Ahmad Zia Massoud from the National Front of Afghanistan. Among other things they discussed the need for increased and regular dialogue between leaders of Afghanistan and Pakistan.

On 30 March, the apex court had directed the National Accountability Bureau to proceed against those who were in the post of minister for water and power from 2006 till the next general elections. As a result, on 20 April, NAB issued arrest warrants for 33 persons, including Ashraf.

== Post-premiership ==
On 16 April 2022, Ashraf was elected unopposed as the 22nd Speaker of the National Assembly.

== Controversies ==
=== Arrest order ===
On 15 January 2013, the Supreme Court of Pakistan ordered the arrest of Raja Pervez Ashraf for alleged corruption as Ashraf was accused of kickbacks from rental power plants that were part of a project intended to serve as part of the solution to Pakistan's power problems. The media derided Raja Pervez Ashraf as Rental Raja. The arrest order came at the same time as the Long March culminated in the national capital of Islamabad. None of the accused in the rental case has been convicted so far. The rental power case is pending with independent Supreme court for nearly four years and no conviction has been made. Ashraf has time and again demanded clearance of his name and denies all the charges. Ashraf in his appearance in the Supreme Court categorically denied such charges and offered his complete cooperation with all authorities and courts. A member of the ruling Pakistan People's Party referred to the arrest order as "a conspiracy" while Pakistan's interior minister Rehman Malik, claimed that "Even after this order, (Ashraf) is the prime minister and, God willing, he will continue as prime minister." The accountability court in Islamabad indicted former Prime Minister Raja Pervez Ashraf and six others in the rental power case on 16 January 2014.

=== Nepotism ===
Raja Pervez Ashraf appointed his son-in-law Raja Azeem in World Bank (Executive Director-Pakistan and others) in violation of rules and an example of nepotism prevalent in Pakistani political elite.

== See also ==
- Left-wing politics in Pakistan

== Notes ==
Political offices
Preceded by Liaquat Ali Jatoi	Minister for Water and Power; 2008–2011	Succeeded by Naveed Qamar
Preceded by Yousaf Raza Gillani	Prime Minister of Pakistan; 2012–2013	Succeeded by Mir Hazar Khan Khoso; Acting
Preceded by Asad Qaiser	Speaker of the National Assembly of Pakistan; 2022–2024	Succeeded by Ayaz Sadiq
