= List of cases of the Supreme Court of Pakistan =

This is an index of lists of cases decided by the Supreme Court of Pakistan.

== By Former Chief Justice Iftikhar Muhammad Chaudhry ==
These lists are sorted chronologically by Chief Justice and include all notable cases decided by the court. Articles exist for almost all cases.

== A Few Major Cases ==
=== Molvi Tamizuddin Khan Case ===
In Molvi Tamizuddin Khan case, the Supreme Court headed by Chief Justice Mohammad Munir backed Governor General Ghulam Mohammad's action to dissolve the first Constitutional Assembly. This judgement of Supreme Court is always strongly criticized by all democratic parties of Pakistan and is referred as a root cause of unstable democracy in Pakistan. This case is reported in PLD 1955 Federal Court 240.

=== The Usif Patel Case ===
The Federal Court (Supreme Court) announced in the main Constitutional Case 'Usif Patel and 2 others versus The Crown', PLD 1955 Federal Court 387 (Appellate Jurisdiction), that the governor general had no capacity to make provisions to the Constitution of Pakistan. After this decision of the Federal Court the nation confronted Constitutional emergency which was more prominent than when the governor general had dissolved the Constituent Assembly.But the decision was expressly limited to Governor General's powers under section 42 of the Government of India act, 1935.

=== Dosso vs Federation of Pakistan ===
In Dosso's case (1958), the Pakistan Supreme Court used jurist Hans Kelsen's theory that a revolution can be justified when the basic norm underlying a Constitution disappears and a new system is put in its place. When revolution came then the old system will be replaced with new system

=== Asma Jilani vs Government of Punjab ===
In the famous case of Asma Jilani, a detailed history of the Martial law in the British days has been mentioned and its comparison has been made with the past days. Two appeals were filed in the case, one by Miss Asma Jilani in the Punjab High Court for the release of her father Malik Ghulam Jilani, and the other by Mrs Zarina Gohar in the Sindh High Court for the release of her husband Altaf Gohar under Article 98 of the Constitution of Pakistan 1962. The detention of Malik Ghulam Jilani and Altaf Gohar had been made under the Martial Law Regulation No.78 of 1971 which was challenged in Lahore and Sindh High Courts respectively. Both the High Courts held that they had no jurisdiction over it because clause 2 of the Jurisdiction of Courts(Removal of Doubts) Order No.3 of 1969 barred the courts from questioning the validity of any act done under the Martial Law Regulation No.78 of 1971. Asma Jilani appealed to Supreme Court of Pakistan where she stated that this country was not a foreign country which had been invaded by any army with General Yahya khan as its head, nor was it an alien territory which had been occupied by the said army. Martial Law could not have arisen in the circumstances. Pakistan had its own legal doctrine, Holy Qur'an and the Objectives Resolution. Therefore, martial law was never superior to the Constitution. Supreme Court further held that Yahya khan was neither a victor nor Pakistan was an occupied territory and thus declared him a 'usurper' and all his actions were also declared illegal. When Asma Jilani case's judgment was released, Yahya Khan was not in power and it was then Bhutto's Martial Law and he was the civilian Chief Martial Law Administrator and the President. Asma Jilani's case paved the way for the restoration of democracy in the country. This case was followed by the interim Constitution of 1972 and then by the permanent Constitution of 1973. Due to the judicial pronouncement in the case of Asma Jilani, Zulfikar Ali Bhutto was compelled to remove the Martial law.

=== Begum Nusrat Bhutto v. Chief of the Army Staff ===
On November 10, 1977 the Supreme Court unanimously validated the imposition of martial law, under the doctrine of necessity. The law of necessity recognized and upheld by Pakistan's highest judicial body has proved an honorable protection for military adventure in civil government.it was the illegal action called law of necessity..

=== Haji Saifullah vs Federation of Pakistan ===
In Federation of Pakistan v Saifullah Khan case, the Supreme Court, held that the dismissal of Mohammad Khan Junejo's government by General Zia in May 1988 was unconstitutional but it refused to restore the National Assembly. This is period where there is Pakistan with no pm of 6 month until Benazir comes

=== Ahmed Tariq Rahim v. Federation of Pakistan ===
On 6 August 1990, President Ghulam Ishaq Khan, under Article 58(2)(b) of the constitution, had dissolved the National Assembly and the government of Benazir Bhutto. The said dissolution order was challenged. The Supreme Court, by majority, upheld the dissolution of the National Assembly. Reference P L D 1992 SC 646

=== Merham Ali vs Federation of Pakistan ===
During Nawaz Sharif's government, the Supreme Court declared unconstitutional several anti-terrorist laws, including the 1997 Anti-Terrorism Act (which established Anti-Terrorism Courts) subsequently amended in October 1998 (Merham Ali vs Federation of Pakistan); and the 1998 Pakistan Armed Forces (Acting in Aid of Civil Power) Ordinance, declared "unconstitutional, without legal authority, and with no legal effect" on 22 February 1999 (Liaquat Hussain versus Federation of Pakistan).

=== Declaring Provisional Constitutional Order (2007) Illegal ===
On 3 November 2007, Chief of the Army Staff declared emergency in Pakistan. The emergency suspended the constitution. A seven panel bench issued a unanimous two-page order declaring the action illegal. The bench consisted of:

- Chief Justice Iftikhar Mohammad Chaudhry
- Justice Rana Bhagwandas
- Justice Javed Iqbal
- Justice Mian Shakirullah Jan
- Justice Nasirul Mulk
- Justice Raja Fayyaz
- Justice Ghulam Rabbani

=== Upholding Provisional Constitutional Order (2007) ===
On 24 November 2007, a seven panel bench of newly constituted supreme court, after imposition of PCO, validated the imposition of emergency and the promulgation of the Provisional Constitution Order issued by the Chief of the Army Staff. The bench consisted of:

- Chief Justice Abdul Hameed Dogar
- Justice Ejazul Hassan
- Justice Muhammad Qaim Jan Khan
- Justice Muhammad Moosa K Laghari
- Justice Chaudhry Ejaz Yousaf
- Justice Muhammad Akhtar Shabbir
- Justice Zia Pervez

=== 2009 PCO Judges case ===
On July 31, 2009, The Supreme Court of Pakistan declared the steps taken on November 3, 2007 by former president Pervez Musharraf as illegal and unconstitutional under the Article 279 of the Constitution.

=== Lifetime disqualification case ===
The Supreme Court unanimously held that electoral disqualification under Article 62(1)(f) of the Constitution of Pakistan was for life in Sami Ullah Baloch v. Abdul Karim Nousherwani. The ruling barred former Prime Minister of Pakistan Nawaz Sharif from holding public office indefinitely, following his disqualification in the Panama Papers case in 2017.
