= Jahangir Pestonji Khambhata =

Parsi actor, director and playwright (1856–1916)

Jahangir Pestonji Khambhata, also spelt Jehangir Pestonjee Khambatta (1856–1916) was a Parsi theatre actor, director and manager, as well as a playwright of the Gujarati theatre.

== Early life ==
Khambhata was born in 1856 in Bombay to a Parsi family. He was raised in Cambay (Khambhat), Gujarat, and joined theatre at a young age. At age 14, he received acclaim for his role as Arnavaz in Kaikhushru Kabraji's play Jamshed (1870). He also played female impersonator roles and was praised for his role of a fairy, Mahru Pari, in Aram's play Benazir-Badremunir (Benazir and Badremunir, 1872), produced by the Victoria Theatrical Company.

== Career ==
Khambhata wanted to visit England to see the plays of Shakespeare, but could not because the ship his troupe boarded moved eastward and he toured Burma, Java, Sumatra and Andaman Islands in 1875. With help of his friend Lalsingh Dulhasingh of Delhi, he established Empress Victoria Theatrical Company which operated from 1876 to 1878. He produced Khudadad (The Gift of God, 1898, based on Shakespeare's Pericles) starring Mary Fenton and Kavasji Palanji Khatau. Khatau and Khambhata later separated from each other. Khambhata also worked with Alfred and Hindi theatre companies later.

He introduced young actors such as Nayak and Bhojak, a traditional performer community from North Gujarat in his troupe. He wrote five plays on Parsi social customs including Juddin Jhaghdo (Juddin's Fiasco, 1905), a farce inspired by a true story of a Parsi man, his non-Parsi wife and their son. Mahro Nataki Anubhav (My Experiences on the Stage, 1914) is his memoir in Gujarati. It was published as sixty-two essays in Parsi weekly. The initial essays describe his birth, parentage, education and the onset of his interest in theatre. Other essays describe the theatre clubs of that time but rarely describe his personal roles.

== Death ==
Khambhata died in 1916.
