= Mary Fenton =

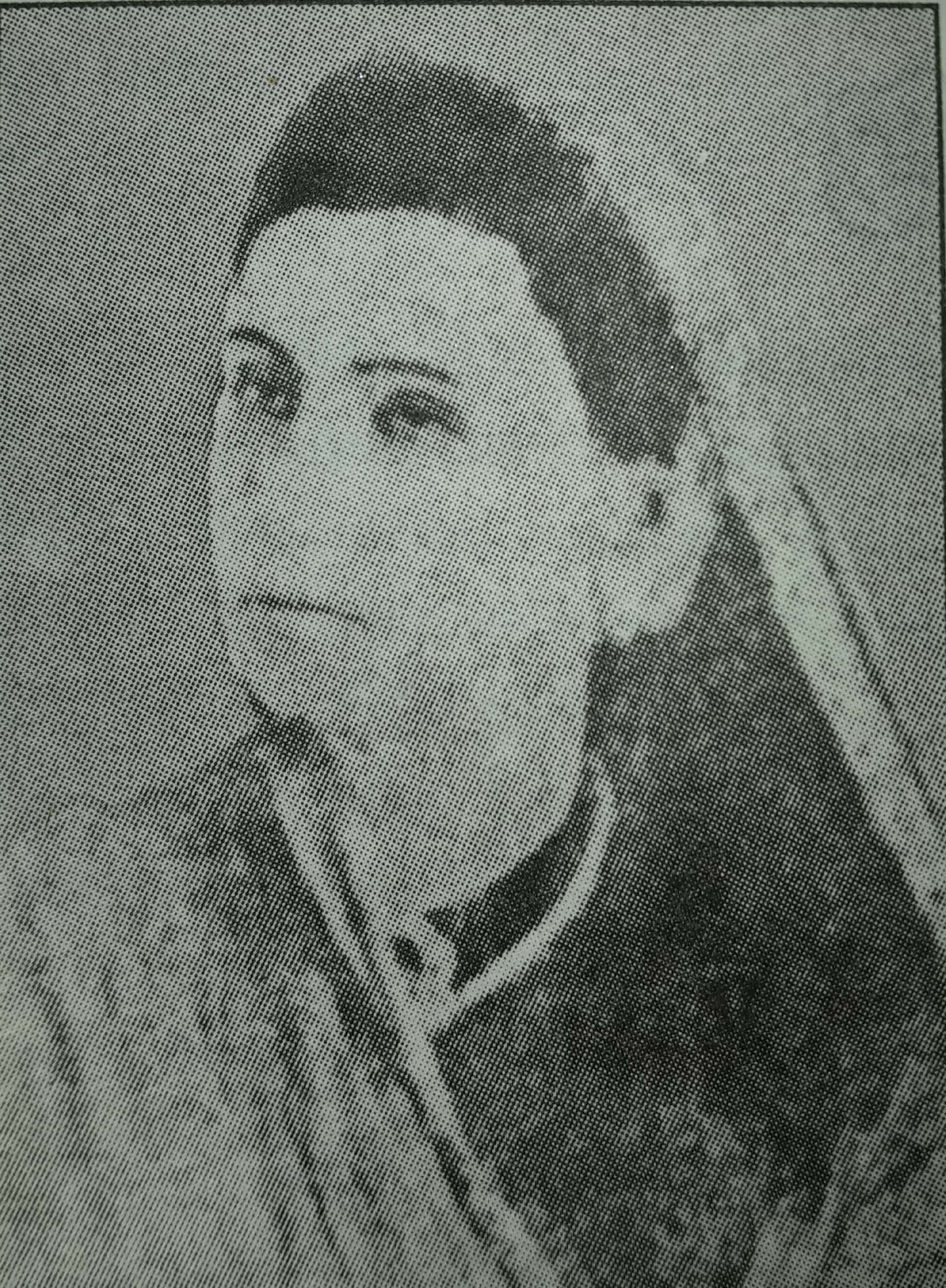
- Born: Mary Jane Fenton c. 1854; Landour, British India
- Died: c. 1896 (aged 41–42)
- Other names: Mehrbai
- Occupation: Stage actress
- Spouse: Kavasji Palanji Khatau
- Children: Jahangir Khatau
- Parents: Mathew Fenton (father); Jannette Fenton (mother)

Mary Fenton alias Mehrbai (c. 1854 – c. 1896) was the first Gujarati, Parsi and Urdu theatre actress of Anglo-Indian origin. Born to an Irish soldier in the British Indian Army, she fell in love and married Parsi actor-director Kavasji Palanji Khatau. He introduced her to acting and she had a successful stage career.

== Early life ==
Mary Fenton was born in Landour near Mussoorie in India to Jannette, an Eurasian, and Mathew Fenton, an Irish retired soldier of the British Indian Army. She was baptized as Mary Jane Fenton, but there is no further information of her early life and education. Parsi theatre actor-director Kavasji Palanji Khatau was rehearsing for his play Inder Sabha, when Fenton had come to book the hall for her magic lantern show. She admired his acting, met him, fell in love and finally married him. Subsequently, she adopted a Parsi name Mehrbai. She already knew Hindi and Urdu, and in the 1870s Khatau gave her further training in singing and acting.

She created a sensation in the theatre due to her talent and relationship with Khatau. However, following a dispute between Khatau and the Empress Victoria Theatrical Company owner Jahangir Pestonjee Khambatta regarding Fenton's entry into theatre in 1878, Khatau left Bombay for Delhi and joined Alfred Theatre Company owned by Manek Master who also opposed Fenton. Consequently, Khatau started his own Alfred Company in 1881, where Fenton had a long and successful career.

Fenton and Khatau later separated. They had a son Jahangir Khatau.

== Career ==
She was the first Anglo-Indian actress of the Parsi, Gujarati, and Urdu theatre. She became popular for her roles as the Parsi heroine. She acted in Nanabhai Ranina's Nazan Shirin (1881), Bamanji Kabra's Bholi Gul (Innocent Flower, 1882, based on Ellen Wood's English novel East Lynne), Agha Hasan Amanat's Urdu opera Inder Sabha, Khambatta's Khudadad (The Gift of God, 1898, based on Shakespeare's Pericles, Prince of Tyre), Gamde ni Gori (Village Nymph, 1890), Alauddin (1891), Tara Khurshid (1892), Kaliyug (1895) and Kalidasa's Sanskrit play Shakuntala. Her role of Jogan in Gopichand was much appreciated.

She had later worked with Framji Apu's theatre company and changed several theatre troupes thereafter.

Mary Fenton is believed to have died at the age of 42, probably in 1896. Hence, she was probably born in 1854 and had met Khatau in 1878. Her introduction in the Parsi theatre opened the way for a large number of Jewish and Anglo-Indian actresses which dominated the early stage, as well as the films of the silent era of India.

== In popular culture ==
Drama Queen (2018) was a play written and directed by Neeyati Rathode, and produced by Blue Feather Theatre based on her life and other early female actresses. Mehrin Saba played Mary Fenton.
