= Theatre of Pakistan =

Theatre in Pakistan (Urdu: تفریح پاکستان) has been developed and influenced by the traditional and ritual Persian theatre as well as the dance practices of the Mughal Empire. As Pakistan is an Islamic state, the production of plays and theatrical performances in the past was not condoned in the country for religious and cultural reasons. That is why this performing art did not have the opportunity to develop and flourish. The concept of Pakistani theatre as a national heritage could only be traced back to modern plays due to the absence of any classical theatrical tradition, while folk literature has also been largely obscured except the performances of the Bhand.

== Background ==
With the establishment of the Delhi Sultanate that began in the 11th centuries, theatre was discouraged or forbidden entirely. Pakistan, like its Middle Eastern neighbors, did not condone the performing arts except the popular performances of comic dialogues that crudely displayed the female body.

Later, however, in an attempt to re-assert indigenous values and ideas, village theatre was encouraged across the Mughal Empire, developing in a large number of regional languages from the 15th to the 19th centuries. The history of theatre beginning this period coincided with- and often mirrored the political developments in Pakistan. Theater groups, for instance, performed repertoires that depicted and challenged extremism as well as biased notions of nationalism, religion and gender.

== Urdu theater ==
The modern theatre in Pakistan, which emerged in 1853, is equated with the Urdu-language theater. It was developed during the period of colonial rule under the British Empire, from the mid-19th century until the mid-20th. The performance of the play Inder Sabha (The Heavenly Court of Indra) written by Agha Hasan Amanat in the court of the last Nawab of Oudh, Wajid Ali Shah in 1855, has been highly regarded as the beginning of Urdu theatre.

There is a controversy with regards to whether Urdu theater was influenced by Western sources or mainly a product of Urdu's literary tradition. There are historians, for instance, who proposed that the style of Inder Sabha had elements that can be traced to the French, a position that Masud Hasan Rizvi rejected. This Indian author claimed that Urdu literature is patterned after ancient Sanskrit plays.

Today, Pakistan has a growing theatre culture, and Urdu theater competes with English plays for dominance in the country's entertainment industry. The major competition with theatre is that represented by growing television industry and the spread of films produced in the Pakistani film industry based in Karachi and Lahore, known as "Lollywood". Lack of finance is another major obstacle.

== Inder Sabha ==
In 1855, the enactment of the play Inder Sabha written by Agha Hasan Amanat in the court of the last Nawab of Oudh, Wajid Ali Shah, marked the beginning of Urdu theatre. The drama dealt with the love story between a fairy and a prince. The Nawab, who was a Kathak dancer and had written theses on stage techniques, composed some of the songs and choreographed the dances for the play. It was a huge success. Its characters (Sabaz Pari (Green Fairy), Kala Deo (Black Devil) and Lal Deo (Red Devil)) live on as a part of the vocabulary of South Asia.

== Post independence theatre ==
=== Pakistani literature ===
The distinct voice of Pakistani literature came soon after the Partition of India in 1947. Since there were many cultural similarities, Urdu and English Literature was inherited by this new state. Over due course, a literature which was somewhat uniquely Pakistani has emerged in every province. Initially the plays were all about the Pakistan Movement and the Persecution of Muslims and anti-Muslim pogroms during the independence by the Hindus and Sikhs. This gradually began to change in 1960s and the current trend is specifically Pakistani venturing into many different genres.

=== Saadat Hasan Manto ===
Manto is arguably the most influential Urdu writer of the 20th century. He was one of the most controversial as well. His work is comparable with D. H. Lawrence. This comparison is made because like Lawrence he also wrote about the topics considered social taboos of his Society. He addressed topics ranging from the socio-economic injustice prevailing in pre- and post-colonial South Asia; he stirred up quite a fury when he wrote about controversial topics of love, sex, incest, prostitution and the typical hypocrisy of a traditional South Asian male. In dealing with these topics, he wasn't careful to conceal any of the facts and clearly showed the true state of affairs. His short stories were often intricately structured, with vivid satire and a good sense of humor.

Manto was a well known film writer of the Indian cinema and was making good money. He however, chose to abandon his lucrative career and migrated to Pakistan. In the seven years that Manto lived in Lahore he continuously struggled for survival. However, he proved to be a productive individual who gave some of his best writings to the literary world regardless of his domestic situation. It was in Lahore that he wrote many of his best known works.

Manto was primarily known for his short stories of the South Asia, great literature out of the events relating to the Partition of India. The literature, which came out of the period that followed, is considered to have been progressive in its tone and spirit. According to several critics it had not only evolved its own identity, but also had played a significant role in documenting the hardships and hopes of Pakistan in the latter part of the 20th century.

Manto also wrote plays and many of his stories have been successfully adapted for the stage. Some of his characters have become legends in the minds of theatergoers.

=== Umer Shareef ===
During the late 1980s Umer Sharif became the most well known stage performer in Pakistan after his extremely popular 1989 comedy stage plays Bakra Qistoon Pay and Buddha Ghar Pe Hai. In both he starred with another comedy legend Moin Akhter. Bakra Qistoon Pay is considered by critics in India & Pakistan to be the show that made stage plays what they are today in Pakistan. Before the advent of Bakra Qistoon Pay majority stage shows in Pakistan used to be classy with rather poetic dialogs. After Bakra Qistoon Pay stage shows became a vibrant, majorly comical (and often gritty) part of the Pakistani culture. Sharif now host a program The Shareef Show Mubarak Ho on Geo TV.

== Types of theatre ==
The general complaint in conservative circles is that commercial theatre is lowbrow and thrives on obscene dialogue and dances. At least three departments are tasked with monitoring the activities of commercial theatre. From the Punjab Arts Council, which is responsible for vetting the scripts, to District Coordination Officers, who are authorized to monitor the screening of plays, to the Home Department, which actually takes action against producers, directors, artists and theatre owners, the dice are loaded against entertainment at every step.

Karachi is also creating theatre of all forms, especially the Karachi arts council. Napa (National Academy of Performing Arts) also works in all the domains and forms of theatre. Both conduct theatre festivals on a regular basis.

=== Local theatre ===
Commercial theatre is surviving this accusation and, in some cases, even thriving this shows that people want entertainment and are prepared to watch plays despite the hazards of doing so. Just like any demand and supply situation, since there is a demand there will be a supply.

The arrival of commercial theatre in Lahore was in the early 1980s. The joint efforts of Naheed Khanum, Amanullah, Mastana and Babu Baral ushered in the art the lively dialogues and innovative style was like a breath of fresh air for the citizens. The initial venue for the staging of these plays was Alhamra but a replacement venue had to be sought once Alhamra closed down for renovations in 1981–1982.

Each and every script has to be cleared by the Punjab Arts Council (PAC).

Lahore has five private (Tamaseel, Mehfil, Naz, Crown and Alfalah) and a government theatre (Alhamra). The moral citizens were scandalized by the low-quality, obscene and vulgar shows called for the closure of commercial theatre have become common in Gujranwala, Faisalabad, Multan and Sahiwal. Most of the complaints originate from religious conservative populace while mostly male crowd enjoy these performances.

In Lahore, most of the audience come from other cities. The theatres are packed on Thursdays, Fridays and Saturdays. A stage play usually runs for 16 days and earns around two million rupees in that time. Tickets cost from Rs. 200 to Rs. 1.

== Training institutions ==
=== Punjab Lok Rahs ===
Punjab Lok Rahs started working as an independent alternative theater group in 1986. The group has seen a number of upheavals both internal and external during its history. On average, the group has held a performance every fortnight since its creation.

It started as a group of young men and women, primarily students, that was concerned with the military oppression of arts and cultural activities in Pakistan. The group cherished a society that has gender equity and democratic values, respects all humans and offers equal economic opportunities to all. Rahs believes in organized and conscious efforts to realize this dream. Theater is its medium.

Rahs' experience in the art of theatre is deep as well. From staging classical epics to quick response street skits and from working out foreign adaptations to improvising ones with community and from performing at overseas festivals to villages and urban slums, Rahs has touched upon a lot of issues. Rahs' canvas is diverse as it has dealt with subjects like child marriage and women's right to marry of their free will and staged plays against arms race and military dictatorship.

Besides experimentation and experience, Rahs has learned theatre from its gurus like Badal Sarkar. Its members have received training from many institutions in other countries.

The group has imparted theatre training to a number of civil society organizations as well. It has supported scores of other organizations by performing for the communities with which they work.

Rahs draws inspiration from Punjab's indigenous theatre tradition. Its name 'Rahs' is the Punjabi word for local form of theatre and its logo shows the basic props of this theatre. The group aims to marry the tradition with modern techniques and concepts and make it an effective tool in the hands of organizations working for social change.

Rahs performs plays only in the mother language of its audience – the people of Punjab. The group believes that the mother language lies at the heart of the issue of cultural identity. The group not only performs but also trains other dramatic societies and community organizations to do theatre as an art and use it as an effective tool of communication.

=== NAPA (National academy of performing arts, Karachi) ===
NAPA is a performing arts school located at Hindu Gymkhana in Karachi, Sindh, Pakistan. NAPA was established in 2005 as an institution to conserve and teach performing arts and music. Until 2023, NAPA was under the leadership of Zia Mohyeddin.

NAPA empowers its graduates to establish and promote a positive regard for higher accomplishment in the Performing Arts. It also provide opportunities to its alumni and students to display their talent through different festivals and in-house NRT productions, which puts on plays on a regular basis. It also creates opportunities for citizens of Karachi to observe high-quality performing arts, language and literature. It offers short and long courses in theatre and music where students from all over the Pakistan participate.

== The advent of commercial theatre in Pakistan ==
=== Theatre in the capital ===
Theatre in Pakistan has been given a professional and commercial face by private production companies that attempt to infuse theatre as a cultural norm in the country. In this respect, the Capital has been exceptionally successful, through the support of the Government and Private Investors, to give a platform to the youth to showcase their talent. 2006 alone saw around eight lavish theatrical productions, and was touted as the year of comedy, as residents of the Capital were treated to a liberal dose of humor and farce.

== Improvisational Theatre ==
=== The Acting Wheel ===
The Acting Wheel, founded in Jan 2011, is Karachi's first drama club of its kind. It's not a theater company, or a school of any kind. It's simply a group of people passionate about acting, who meet every other week in Karachi to spontaneously act out. The "act-ups" or "act-olutions" (like revolutions of The Acting Wheel) consist of giving out scripts to participants and enabling them to spontaneously act out the scripts creatively. Participants also play acting games frequently, including improv and comedy.

=== Black Fish ===
Founded in 2002, Black Fish was the first of its kind improvisational theatre troupe in Pakistan. It had a huge following and was very popular among the youth. The group catered to all age groups.

The troupe used to perform every Sunday but reduced the frequency of their public shows to every fortnight. Even though they did not advertise heavily, the troupe's popularity spread from word of mouth and an occasional radio announcement that helped the shows manage to draw a packed crowd who sometimes had no place to sit, thus, resorting to sitting on the stairs.

Despite being a Karachi-based group, Black Fish managed to take its performances to other Pakistani cities such as Lahore, Islamabad and even Faisalabad.

In 2004 Black Fish was also selected by the British Council to represent Pakistan in an International Youth Theatre Festival Manchester called Contacting The World.

The troupe has worked with Pakistan's leading English Newspaper, Dawn, to put together the first ever Comedy Festival which was held in Karachi in November 2006.

The group has since disbanded and 'Sami Shah', a member of the group is now a standup comedian.

=== School plays ===
Each year, the Old Grammarians Society (OGS) gets together and puts up a play at the PACC. These plays are usually in English and the audiences are mostly Grammarians. These plays act as sort of a reunion for all the current students to get together in a single place and feel a sense of unity with their predecessors.

The plays consist of actors who are the alumni of the old school and are to a degree quite seasoned in their vocation. The props and settings of the plays are of a high standard and this explains the cost of the tickets which range from Rs. 500 to Rs. 1000 or more. This explains the kind of audience that is expected.

These plays are popularized through word of mouth.

=== Foreign theatre companies ===
At the Lahore World Performing Arts Festival the Euro Theatre Central performed for the fifth time. It had performed a German play dialogues of which were learnt by the troupe in English for the benefit of the local audience. The play entitled "Liebesgeflüster" (Raaz and Nias) from Bonn to Lahore. The sponsor of the festival was Rafi Peer. This attracted a huge amount of attention from the locals. The German ambassador even made the journey from Islamabad for the Pakistani premier.

There were artists from Switzerland, Germany and the Wall Street Theatre group from Cologne/Aachen with its Anglo-Saxon two-man artistic comedy show is perfect proof of the fact that humour. A youth group from Uzbekistan was also present along with many Indian and Pakistani dancers and performers.

== Academic Institutes ==
- Beaconhouse National University
- National Academy of Performing Arts
