= Kavasji Palanji Khatau =

Singer, actor, director and owner of the Parsi theatre company in India

- Born: 1857; Bombay, British India
- Died: 16 August 1916 (aged 58–59); Lahore, British India
- Occupations: Stage actor, director, manager
- Years active: 1875–1916
- Spouse: Mary Fenton
- Children: Jahangir Khatau
- Father: Palanji

Kavasji Palanji Khatau, also spelled Cowasji Palanji Khatao (1857 – 16 August 1916) was a singer, actor, director, and owner of a Parsi theatre company, who started his career with the Empress Victoria Theatrical Company. Despite opposition from his employers, he introduced Mary Fenton, his wife and the first Anglo-Indian actress, to the stage. This led him to start his own company, the Alfred Theatre Company, where he, his wife, and other actors had successful careers.

== Biography ==
Khatau was born into a poor Parsi family in 1857, and brought up in a house opposite the Dukkar Bazar (pig market) in the Dhobi Talao area of Bombay (now Mumbai). He was an avid reader in childhood and could read and recite Shakespeare's plays. He started acting in 1875 and subsequently caught the attention of Jehangir Pestonjee Khambatta, who owned the Empress Victoria Theatrical Company. Khatau joined the Company in 1877 following which Khambatta taught him stagecraft.

Khatau was rehearsing for his play Inder Sabha when Mary Fenton, a daughter of an Irish soldier in the British Indian Army, had come to book the hall for her magic lantern show. She admired his acting, met him, fell in love and finally married him. Fenton subsequently adopted the Parsi name of Mehrbai. Khatau then trained her in singing and acting in the 1870s.

Fenton created a sensation in the theatre due to her talent and relationship with Khatau. However, a dispute arose between Khatau and Khambatta regarding her entry into theatre. Khatau therefore left Bombay for Delhi and joined the Alfred Theatre Company, owned by Manek Master who also opposed Fenton. As a consequence, in 1881, Khatau left and started his own Alfred Theatre Company with others, following which Fenton had a long and successful career. It was later renamed the New Alfred Company. Fenton and Khatau later separated. They had a son Jahangir Khatau who took over the Company and kept it operational until 1932.

Fenton acted in Nanabhai Ranina's Nazan Shirin (1881), Bamanji Kabra's Bholi Gul (Innocent Flower, 1882, based on Ellen Wood's English novel East Lynne), Agha Hasan Amanat's Urdu opera Inder Sabha, Khambatta's Khudadad (The Gift of God, 1898, based on Shakespeare's Pericles, Prince of Tyre), Gamde ni Gori (Village Nymph, 1890), Alauddin (1891), Tara Khurshid (1892), Kaliyug (1895) and Kalidasa's Sanskrit play Shakuntala; many produced by his Alfred Company.

The Alfred Company had several popular actors like Sohrabji Oghra, Amrit Keshav Nayak, and Vallabh Keshav Nayak who performed adaptations of Shakespeare's plays. Syed Mehdi Hasan Ahsan's Khun-e-Nahaq (Unjustified Murder, 1898, based on Hamlet) brought Khatau recognition and he came to be known as "India's Irving" by viewers.

At one time he managed and significantly influenced Narayan Prasad Betab, a future prominent Parsi playwright. He was also a musician and his songs for Alibaba became popular.

He was honoured for his contribution to Gujarati and Urdu theatre in 1908. He died on 16 August 1916 on a tour in Lahore.
