= Amrit Keshav Nayak =

Indian Parsi theatre actor and director (1877–1907)

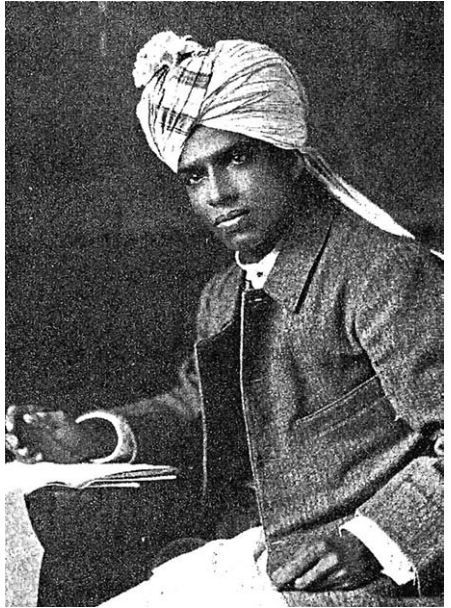
- Amrit Keshav Nayak
- Born: 14 April 1877; Ahmedabad, Gujarat
- Died: 18 July 1907 (aged 30); Bombay
- Occupations: actor, director, poet, writer
- Spouse: Parvati
- Partner: Gauhar Jaan
- Children: Saroj
- Writing career
- Pen name: Shivsambhu Sharmano Chiko
- Language: Gujarati
- Notable work: M. A. Banake Kyon Meri Mitti Kharab Ki? (1908)

Amrit Keshav Nayak (14 April 1877 – 18 July 1907) was a Parsi theatre actor-director, lyricist and Gujarati author. He joined theatre at early age and later directed several plays including adaptations of plays of Shakespeare. He wrote plays and novels also.

== Biography ==
=== Early life ===
Nayak was born in Ahmedabad on 14 April 1877 (Vaishakh Shukla 1 Vikram Samvat 1933) to Nayak family. He lived in Kalupur area of the city. He studied only four grades and two grades in Urdu. Nayak moved to Bombay with his father.

=== Theatre and lyricist career ===
In 1888, he joined Alfred Company at the age of eleven at the salary of forty rupees a month. After his successful roles of Baheram Irani and Pumba in Bamanji Kabraji's Gamde ni Gori (Village Nymph, 1890) and Bimar-e-Bulbul respectively, he went to Lucknow to study theatre under Bindadin Maharaj. He learned music there. After his return in 1891, he directed Allauddin and played Laila himself whose success elevated him to post of Assistant Manager at the age of 15. He pioneered the adaptation of plays of Shakespeare in Urdu. He directed Mehdi Hasan Ahsan's Khun-e-Nahaq (Unjustified Murder, 1898, based on Hamlet) and Bazum-e-Fani (Fatal Union, 1898, based on Romeo and Juliet) for Kavasji Palanji Khatau's Alfred Theatre Company. He directed several plays of Urdu dramatist Agha Hashar Kashmiri including his adaptation of Shakespeare's play, Murid-e-Shaque (Victim of Suspicion, 1899, based on A Winter's Tale) and Shahid-e-Naaz (Measure for Measure, 1904) . Following differences with Khatau in 1904, he left the Alfred Company joined Framji Apu's Parsi Natak Mandali as a director. He produced Shakespeare's Cymbeline in Urdu as Meetha Zahar ('Sweet Poison'). He was married to Parvati, an illiterate girl from Kadi at an early age. They had a daughter named Saroj. He had a brief relationship with singer and dancer Gauhar Jaan whom he met around 1904–05 in Bombay and together they wrote and composed several hit songs like Pardesi Saiyyan Nena Lagake Dukh De Gaye, Sar Par Gagar Dhar Kar, Dilenadaan Ko Hum Samjhate Jayenge, Aan Baan Jiya Mein Laagi. He was working on his new production Narayan Prasad Betab's Zahari Saanp before he died on 18 July 1907 (Ashadh Sukla 8 Vikram Samvat 1963) in Bombay following heart attack.

=== Literary career ===
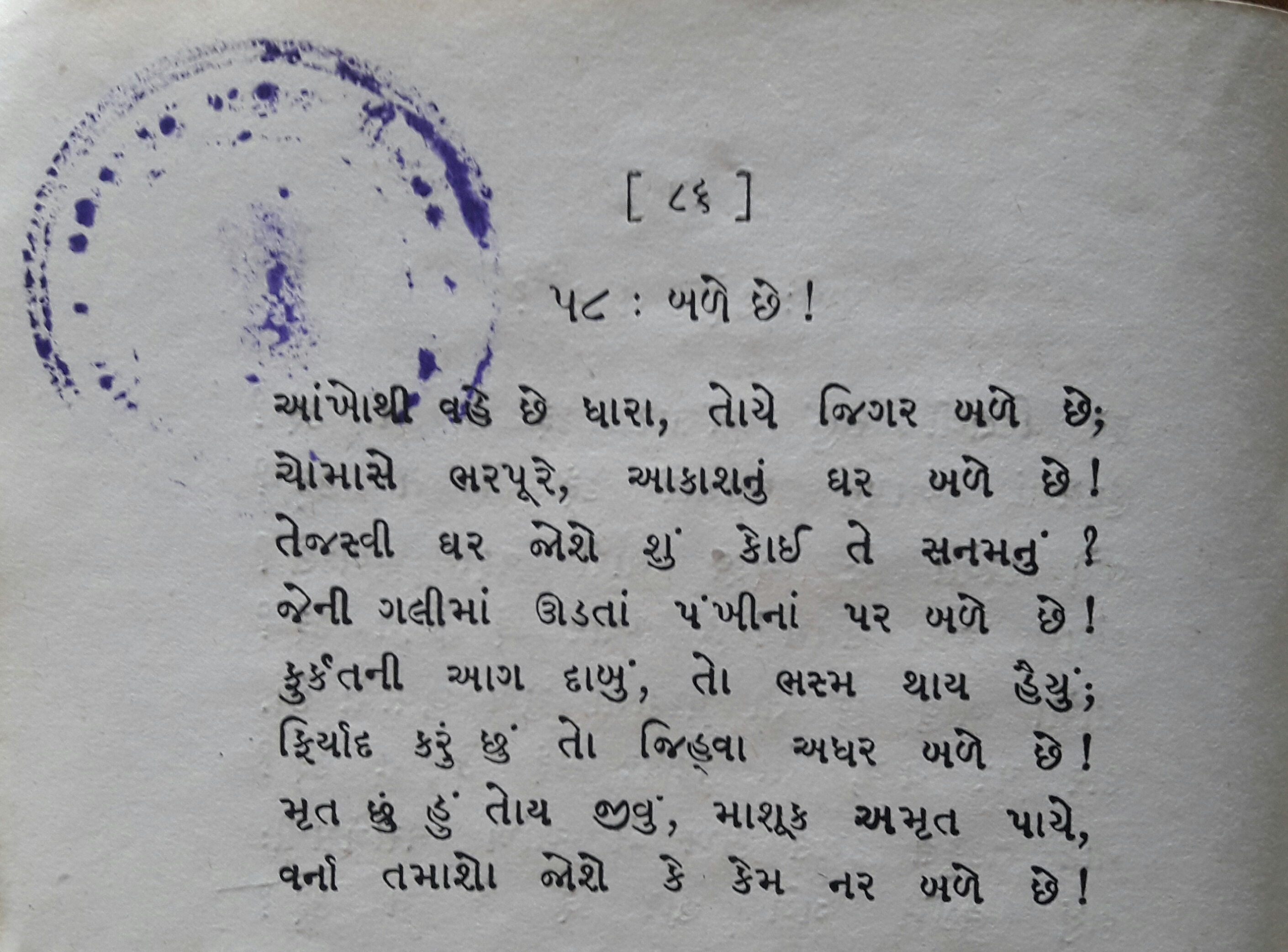
Aankho Thi Vahe Chhe Dhara, a ghazal by Nayak

Nayak's pen-name was Shivsambhu Sharmano Chiko (Gujarati: શિવશંભુ શર્માનો ચિકો).

Nayak wrote a column for Amrita Bazar Patrika and Gujarati periodicals. Chiththa Lekhanmala column in Gujarati has some influence on the Indian independence movement. He wrote a play, Bharat Durdasha Natak (1909) about prevalent condition of India. His novel M. A. Banake Kyon Meri Mitti Kharab Ki? (1908) was about shortcomings of education system. His another novel, Mariyam was about a Muslim life. His incomplete and unpublished works are Sanskrit ane Farsi Bhasha no Paraspar Sambandh (Relationship of Sanskrit and Persian languages) and Nadirshah. Apart from lyrics for songs for his plays, he wrote Gazals in Gujarati too.

== Legacy ==
The Amrit Keshav Nayak Road behind Khadi Bhandar in Fort area of Mumbai is named after Nayak.

== See also ==
- List of Gujarati-language writers
