= Harkat-ul Mujahideen al-Alami =

Militant organization in Pakistan

Harkat-ul-Mujahideen al-Alami (Urdu: حرکت المجاهدين العالمی) is a militant organization in Pakistan. In 2002, Kamran Atif a member of this organization, tried to assassinate President Pervez Musharraf. Arrested in 2004 during a police shoot-out, he was sentenced to death in 2006 by an Anti-Terrorism Court.
