= Kamran Atif =

Militant criminal

Kamran Atif (Urdu: کامران عاطف) is a member of Harkat-ul Mujahideen al-Alami. In 2002, he tried to assassinate President Pervez Musharraf. Following a shootout with police, Atif was arrested in Karachi in 2004. He was sentenced to death in 2006 by the Anti-Terrorism Court in Pakistan. The death sentence was later commuted.
