= M. A. Banake Kyon Meri Mitti Kharab Ki? =

1908 novel by Amrit Keshav Nayak

- Author: Amrit Keshav Nayak
- Original title: એમ. એ. બનાકે ક્યોં મેરી મિટ્ટી ખરાબ કી?
- Language: Gujarati
- Genre: Social novel
- Publisher: Gujarati Press, Gujarat Sahitya Akademi
- Publication date: 1908
- Publication place: India

M. A. Banake Kyon Meri Mitti Kharab Ki? (Why did you spoil my life making me do my M. A.?) (Note: Alternative translation of the title:Why did you educate me and destroy my honour?) is a 1908 Gujarati social novel by the Indian writer Amrit Keshav Nayak (1877–1907). It is an autobiographical style novel of an unemployed postgraduate. It is a satire on the education system and prevalent social customs. The novel was well-received by readers.

== History ==
Amrit Keshav Nayak, a popular Gujarati and Urdu theatre actor and writer, serialised the novel in the weekly magazine, Gujarati. It was posthumously published in book form in 1908 by Gujarati Press. It had several editions. The novel was republished by Gujarat Sahitya Akademi.

== Content ==
The novel has 50 chapters depicting the shortcomings of the contemporary education system and prevalent unemployment among the educated. It is also a satire on an egoist who is alienated from his clan because of his superiority complex. It is written in an autobiographical style which quickly gains sympathy of the readers.

The lead character, Manekchand, has studied for an M.A. from the Government College in Lahore. He had studied for a B.A. in mathematics and philosophy. He has spent money from his poor family to gain these degrees and has also destroyed himself with hard work for it. The first chapter presents the answers from employers who have rejected his job applications depicting joblessness among the educated. His joblessness is looked down upon by other people.

There are ten to twelve characters in this didactic social novel with their own personalities and characteristics. Three chapters are dedicated to the history of Japan which was undergoing major industrialization and reforms at the time. It also depicted prevalent issues of joint families, casteism and social customs, but these things interrupt the story. It also includes a theme of nationalism. The language of the novel has influences of Hindi, Urdu and Persian languages. The dialogues are theatrical in nature because of Nayak's experience with the theatre.

The preface of the novel included a biographical essay on Nayak by his friend Thakkur Narayandas Visanji.

== Translation ==
The novel was translated into Hindi by Chhannulal Dwivedi and published by Pustak Bhavan in Banaras in 1923.

== Reception ==
The novel was well-received by readers and became popular. According to the British Museum catalogue, the novel "[exposed] the evils of social life of Indian graduates of the present time".
