= Chaubola =

Quatrain meter in the poetry of India and Pakistan

Chaubola (Hindustani: चौबोला or چوبولا) is a quatrain meter in the poetry of North India and Pakistan, often employed in folk songs.

== Example ==
In one sequence in the Urdu opera Inder Sabha, Indra, the king of the gods, enters his court and announces in a chaubola -

Urdu

راجا هوں میں قوم کا اور اِندر میرا نام

بِن پریوں کی دید کے مُجهے نهیں آرام
میرا سنگلدیپ میں مُلکوں مُلکوں راج
جی میرا هے چاہتا کی جلسہ دیکهوں آج

Transcription

Raja hun main qaum ka aur Indar mera naam
Bin pariyon ki deed ke mujhe nahin araam
Mera Sangaldip mein mulkon-mulkon raj
Ji mera hai chahta ki jalsa dekhun aaj

Translation

I am king, and my name is Indar
Accustomed to the company of fairies
My rule stretches across the nations of Sangaldip
And today, I wish to see a spectacle!
