= Mehram Ali versus Federation of Pakistan =

Supreme Court of Pakistan case

Mehram Ali v. Federation Pakistan (PLD 1998 SC 1445) is considered to be an important judgment of Supreme Court of Pakistan and marked the importance of the independence of a judiciary, particularly in reference to the Article 175 of the Constitution of Pakistan.

== Background ==
On January 18, 1997, Mehram Ali, a member of Shia organization called Sipah-e-Muhammad Pakistan the armed wing of Tehrik-e-Jafaria Pakistan (TJP), detonated a remote-controlled bomb in the vicinity of the Lahore courts, where the two leaders of the Sepah-Sehaba Pakistan (SSP), an anti-Shia group of Sunnis, were brought for a hearing before the additional session judge. The explosion killed twenty-three people, including the two Sunni leaders, and injured more than fifty people. Mehram Ali was caught on the spot but his trial before the Sessions court went forth slowly.

== Trial in Special Court ==
The Government of Pakistan enacted the 1997 Anti-Terrorism Act signed on August 17, 1997 by then Prime Minister Nawaz Sharif, which created a new court system dedicated to trying cases related to terrorism in a speedy manner. Mehram Ali's case was transferred to the newly constituted Anti-Terrorism Court. The ATC convicted Mehram Ali on twenty-three counts of murder and various other charges relating to the bombing. In September 1997, Mehram Ali was sentenced to 23 death sentences and 550 years imprisonment.

Mehram Ali filed an appeal before the newly constituted Anti-Terror Appellate Tribunal in Lahore. The ATA upheld his conviction.

== Appeal in Supreme Court ==
Mehram Ali then filed a writ petition before the Lahore High Court claiming, among other things, that the formation of the special courts violated the provisions of the Constitution. The Lahore High Court claimed jurisdiction to hear the appeal, but held that the conviction should still stand.

Mehram Ali then filed an appeal to the Supreme Court of Pakistan. In its decision, Mehram Ali Versus Federation of Pakistan, the Court upheld Mehram Ali’s conviction and he was later executed.

The Court also declared certain sections of ATA 1997 to be unconstitutional and in need of amendment. It was declared that the newly constituted anti-terror court would be subject to the rules and procedures of the existing constitutionally established judicial system, including:

- the judges of such courts would have fixed and established tenure of service
- such special courts would be subject to the same or similar procedural rules as regular courts, including rules of evidence, etc.;
- decisions of specials courts would be subject to appeal before the relevant constitutionally mandated regular courts. Namely, the appeal against the decision of the special court would lie with the respective High Courts and ultimately with the Supreme Court.

It held that no parallel legal system can be constructed that bypasses the operation of the existing regular courts.

Justice Irshad Hasan Khan in his additional note in the judgment observed:

I would add a note of caution that sacrifice of justice to obtain speed disposition of cases could hardly be termed as “justice”. A balance ought to be maintained between the two commonly known maxims, “justice delayed is justice denied” and “justice rushed is justice crushed”. I do not suggest that speed and efficiency ought not to be ultimate measure of a Court but it should not be at the expense of justice.

== Aftermath ==
Against this backdrop, the Government amended the act and incorporated the changes as suggested by the Supreme Court. On October 24, 1998, the Anti-Terrorism (Amendment) Ordinance was issued. Under this ordinance, anti-terrorism courts remained in place and the judges of such courts were granted tenure of office; special Appellate Tribunals were disbanded and appeals against the decision of the anti-terror courts would be submitted to the respective High Courts; and restrictions were placed on ATA 1997’s provisions regarding trials in absentia to accord with regular legal procedures. The M ehram Ali case also formed the main precedent for the Supreme Court in Liaquat Hussain's case.
