= Anti-Terrorism Court of Pakistan =

Court dealing with cases of terrorism in Pakistan

The Anti-Terrorism Court of Pakistan (Urdu: عدالت انسداد دہشتگردی, romanized: Adalt Ansadad Dahshatgardi, ATC) was established in Pakistan in 1997, under Nawaz Sharif's government, to deal with terrorism cases. It is a parallel legal system to the judicial system in Pakistan.

== 1997 creation and subsequent amendments ==
The court had been created by the 1997 Anti-Terrorist Act, amended on 24 October 1998 by the Anti-Terrorism (Amendment) Ordinance following the Supreme Court judgment (Merham Ali versus Federation of Pakistan, 1998) declaring most of its provisions unconstitutional. A short time before being ousted from power by Pervez Musharraf's coup, Sharif enacted the 25 August 1999 Pakistan Anti-Terrorism (Amendment) Ordinance which generalized the ATC system to all the country.

== Anti-terrorism courts under General Pervez Musharraf ==
Following Pervez Musharraf's 1999 coup, Nawaz Sharif was judged and given a life sentence in 2000 by the ATC, which was commuted into exile.

In 2000, Kamran Atif, an alleged member of Harkat-ul Mujahideen al-Alami, attempted to assassinate Musharraf; the ATC sentenced him to death in 2006. Following Musharraf's resignation in 2008, Pakistan placed a moratorium on capital punishment, which lasted until 2012.

== Criticism ==
The court has been criticized as vulnerable to political influence. Popular examples include Nawaz Sharif's life imprisonment in a 1999 case, Balochi politician Akhtar Mengal, as well as PTI members for the cases stemming from the May 9 riots.

Amnesty International noted that Section 37 of the law which aims to bring in anyone "who scandalizes the Court or Tribunal or otherwise does anything which tends to bring the Court or Tribunal... into hatred, ridicule or contempt". The existing court system in Pakistan is also already capable of handling all offences that fall in the scope of ATC.

== See also ==
- Anti-terrorism legislation in Pakistan
- Capital punishment in Pakistan
- Human rights in Pakistan
- Anti-Terrorism Act 1997
