= Inder Sabha =

Urdu play

Inder Sabha (Urdu: اندر سبھا, lit. "the Council of Indra") is an Urdu play and opera written by Agha Hasan Amanat, and first staged in 1853. It is regarded as the first complete Urdu stage play ever written. The play was translated into German in the 1880s as a doctoral thesis at the University of Leipzig by Friedrich Rosen, and published to positive critical reception in 1892. A film, Indrasabha, based on the play was released by Madan Theatre in 1932.

== The play ==
The opera is set in the celestial court of Indra, the king of the gods (devas) in Hindu mythology. The play is written entirely in verse, and the central theme is a romance between a prince and a fairy. Operatic devices such as fireworks and masks are employed in enacting the play. Although the play was initially intended to be performed in royal court, songs from the play influenced the geet tradition in Urdu and quickly transitioned into popular culture, where "for at least two generations after that, actors and musicians of Oudh sang the songs of Inder Sabha." The play included "31 ghazals, 9 thumri of gaya and Benares gharana, 4 holis, 15 songs and two chaubolas and five chhands with enough scope for dances as well."

The play is considered a seminal work that directly influenced several important nineteenth and early-twentieth century Urdu plays that followed it, including Khadim Husain Afsos's Bazm-e-Suleman (1862), Bahiron Singh Asmat's Jashn-e-Parastan and Taj Mahal Farrukh's Nigaristan-e-Farrukh (1911).

== Commissioning ==
Although it is widely regarded as the first Urdu stage play, it is disputed how the play came to be created. While some historians have contended that Agha Hasan Amanat was commissioned by Wajid Ali Shah to write it, others (such as Abdul Halim Sharar) have asserted that it was written entirely independently by Amanat.

== Adaptations ==
Manilal Joshi made Indrasabha, an Indian silent film based on the play in 1925. Another film Indrasabha, released in 1932, was one of the earliest sound films made in India, the very next year after Alam Ara, which was the first Indian talkie. It featured over seventy songs and was 211 minutes long. The film was made by Jamshedji Framji Madan's company, Madan Theatre and starred Jehanara Kajjan among others. Indrasabha holds the world record for the most songs (72) in any musical ever made. A. Narayanan, R. S. Prakash followed Madan's Hindi film adaptation with Indrasabha (1936), another sound film this time in Tamil.
