= Agha Hasan Amanat =

Urdu writer

Agha Hasan Amanat (Urdu: آغا حسن امانت, romanized: Āġā Ḥasan Amānat, b. 1815, d. 1858) was an Urdu poet, writer and playwright of the nineteenth century from the city of Lucknow. He was affiliated with the court of Wajid Ali Shah, the princely ruler of Awadh. His name was Agha Hasan Ali, while "Amanat" was his nom de plume (or takhallus). He is also referred to as Amanat Lakhnavi (i.e. Amanat of Lucknow) and Mirza Amanat.

== Personal history ==
Agha Hasan Amanat descended from a family of Iranian immigrants who moved to Lucknow in 1815. His father's name was Syed Ali Mashhadi (i.e., Syed Ali of Mashhad), who was resident of Iran. He had two sons

- Syed Agha Hasan Fasahat
- Syed Agha Hasan Latafat

== Works ==
Amanat's compositions and works include the first stage play in Urdu, Inder Sabha. He is also credited with beginning the geet tradition in Urdu.

== See also ==
- Inder Sabha
- Wajid Ali Shah
