= Panama Papers case =

2017 Supreme Court of Pakistan decision

Imran Ahmed Khan Niazi vs Muhammad Nawaz Sharif
- Court: Supreme Court of Pakistan
- Decided: July 28, 2017; 9 years ago
- Citation: PLD 2017 SC 265; PLD 2017 SC 692

Case history
- Subsequent action: Court rules that electoral disqualification under Article 62(1)(f) continues for life in Sami Ullah Baloch v. Abdul Karim Nousherwani.
- Related action: Court disqualifies Jahangir Khan Tareen from holding public office in Hanif Abbasi v. Jahangir Khan Tareen.

Ruling
- Mian Nawaz Sharif disqualified from holding office as Prime Minister and Member of National Assembly. National Accountability Bureau ordered to initiate legal proceedings against the Sharif family.

Court membership
- Judges sitting: Justices: Asif Saeed Khan Khosa; Ejaz Afzal Khan; Gulzar Ahmed; Azmat Saeed; Ijaz-ul-Ahsan

Case opinions
- Majority: Ejaz Afzal Khan, joined by a unanimous bench

Laws applied
- Article 62(1)(f) of the Constitution of Pakistan Section 12(2)(f), 19(f) of the Representation of People Act, 1976

The Panama Papers case (officially titled Imran Ahmed Khan Niazi v. Muhammad Nawaz Sharif), or the Panamagate case, was a 2017 landmark decision by the Supreme Court of Pakistan that disqualified Nawaz Sharif, the prime minister of Pakistan, from holding public office for life.

Opposition politicians Imran Khan and Sheikh Rasheed petitioned the court in the aftermath of the Panama Papers leak, which uncovered links between the Sharif family and eight offshore companies. The court initially ordered the formation of a joint investigation team (JIT) to inquire into allegations of money laundering, corruption, and contradictory statements by Sharif and his relations in a 3–2 split decision on 20 April 2017, with the dissenting judges ruling that Sharif be disqualified. After the JIT submitted its report and subsequent arguments were heard, the court disqualified Sharif from holding public office by unanimous verdict.

The case has been described as the most publicized in Pakistan's history, as well as a "defining moment" for the country.

== Background ==
=== Panama Papers leak case ===
On April 3, 2016, the International Consortium of Investigative Journalists (ICIJ) made 11.5 million secret documents, later known as the Panama Papers, available to the public. The documents, sourced from Panamanian law firm Mossack Fonseca, among other revelations about other public figures in many other countries, included details of eight offshore companies with links to the family of Nawaz Sharif, the then-incumbent prime minister of Pakistan, and his brother Shehbaz Sharif, the incumbent Chief Minister of Punjab. According to the ICIJ, Sharif's children Maryam Nawaz, Hassan Nawaz and Hussain Nawaz "were owners or had the right to authorise transactions for several companies". Mossack Fonseca records tied the children to four offshore companies, Nescoll Limited, Nielson Holdings Limited, Coomber Group Inc., and Hangon Property Holdings Limited. The companies acquired luxury real estate in London from 2006 to 2007. The real estate was collateral for loans of up to $13.8 million, according to the leaked Panama Papers.

=== Failure to form judicial commission ===
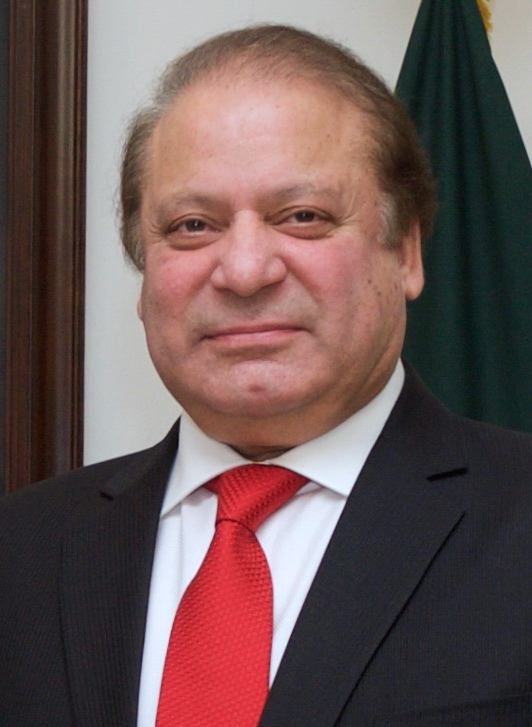
Nawaz Sharif, former prime minister of Pakistan and the prime defendant in the case

Facing growing criticism, Sharif announced the formation of a judicial commission under a retired judge of the Supreme Court of Pakistan, in a nationwide address on April 5, 2016. However, former justices Tassaduq Hussain Jillani, Nasir-ul-Mulk, Amir-ul-Mulk Mengal, Sahir Ali, and Tanvir Ahmad Khan all refused to participate and no commission was formed. The federal government remained committed to forming a commission, negotiating its terms of reference with opposition parties Pakistan People's Party and Pakistan Tehreek-e-Insaf. In a second address on 22 April 2016, Sharif announced he would resign if proven guilty. The latter effort failed when Chief Justice of Pakistan Anwar Zaheer Jamali, cited broad, open-ended terms of reference and the limited scope of the law in this area, and declined to form "a toothless commission, which will serve no useful purpose."

=== Prime minister's speech ===
In a televised address to the National Assembly of Pakistan on May 16, 2016, Sharif suggested forming a joint committee to draft the terms of reference for establishing a judicial commission. He said he was not afraid of accountability, while criticizing opposition figures: "Today, people living in bungalows and commuting in helicopters are accusing me of misconduct. Can they explain before the nation as to how they earned all this money and how much tax they paid?" In his speech, Sharif said he would clear the air about the London flats, but did not return to the subject. He reiterated that the flats had been purchased with money earned from the sale of Jeddah Steel Mills, which had belonged to his father. Later, Sharif omitted any reference to his family's business connections with the Qatari royal family during his 16 May speech, inviting allegations of contradictory statements.

=== Opposition response ===
Following Sharif's speech, PTI chairman Imran Khan filed a petition through counsel Naeem Bokhari with the Supreme Court of Pakistan on 29 August 2016, seeking Sharif's disqualification as prime minister and as a member of the National Assembly of Pakistan. Other political leaders including Sheikh Rashid Ahmed of Awami Muslim League, and Siraj-ul-Haq of Jamat-e-Islami, also expressed support for the petition. It targeted Sharif's children, his son-in-law Muhammad Safdar, and his brother-in-law and the incumbent finance minister Ishaq Dar as well. PTI workers staged a sit-in outside Sharif's private residence at Raiwind near Lahore on 30 September 2016. Khan subsequently called on supporters to "lock-down" Islamabad until Nawaz Sharif "resigned or presented himself for accountability".

== Supreme Court of Pakistan ==
=== Initial hearings ===
The court's initial five-member bench for hearing the case was headed by Chief Justice Jamali and comprised Justices Asif Saeed Khan Khosa, Amir Hani Muslim, Sh. Azmat Saeed, and Ijaz-ul-Ahsan. The hearings began 1 November 2016. PTI leader Imran Khan was represented by Bokhari and Hamid Khan. Legal counsel for Sharif and his children were senior lawyers Salman Aslam Butt and Akram Sheikh. The court also accepted additional petitions filed by other opposition figures, including Jamaat-e-Islami leader Siraj-ul-Haq and Sheikh Rashid Ahmad. In their reply, Sharif lawyers Butt and Shoaib Rashid informed the bench that though they owned properties abroad, Hassan and Hussain Nawaz had been running a business lawfully for decades, that Maryam Nawaz was not dependent on her father, nor was she the beneficial owner of the cited offshore companies, Nielsen and Nescoll, but a trustee. Justice Khosa required counsel to satisfy the bench that the money had been lawfully earned and transferred. The court also questioned the quality of PTI's evidence, with Justice Saeed remarking that newspaper clippings were only good for "selling pakoras" the day after publication.

=== Qatari letter ===
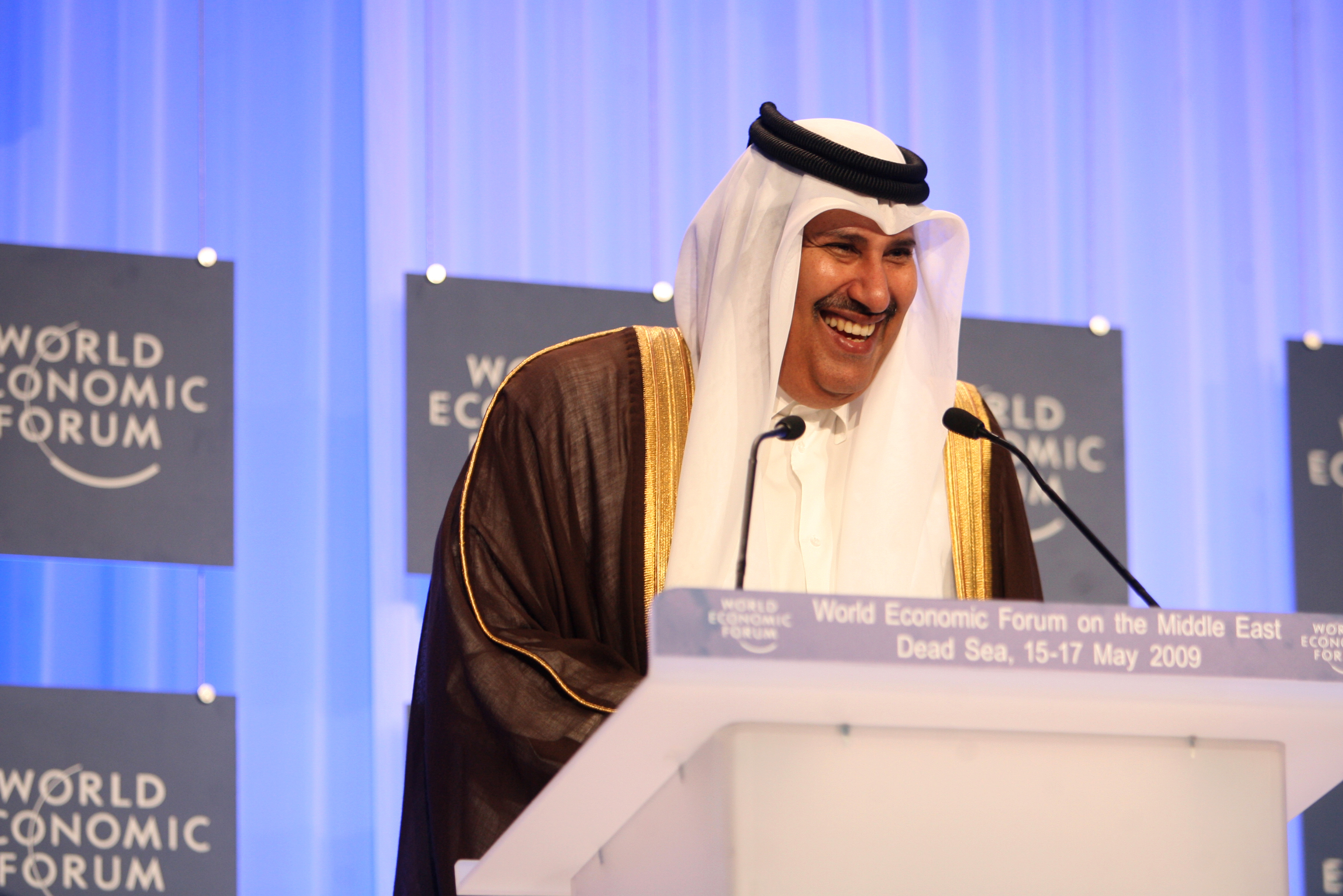
The court observed that the letter written by Qatari royal Hamad bin Jassim bin Jaber Al Thani (pictured) "completely changed the public stand of the prime minister".

On 14 November 2016, Sharif lawyer Sheikh dramatically produced a letter written by Hamad bin Jassim bin Jaber Al Thani, the prime minister of Qatar from 2007 to 2013. The letter, marked private and confidential, read:

[My father Jassim] had longstanding business relations with (Sharif's father) Mian Mohammad Sharif which were coordinated through my eldest brother... Mian Sharif expressed his desire to invest a certain amount of money in the real estate business of Al Thani family in Qatar. I understood at that time, that an aggregate sum of around Dirhams 12 million was contributed by Mian Sharif, originating from the sale of business in Dubai (for four flats: 16, 16A, 17 and 17A Avenfield House, Park Lane, London, registered under the ownership of two offshore companies, while their bearer share certificates were kept in Qatar). These were purchased from the proceeds of the real estate business... I can recall that during his lifetime, Mian Sharif wished that the beneficiary of his investment and returns in the real estate business [should be] his grandson Hussain Nawaz Sharif.

Justice Khosa observed that the document had "completely changed the public stand of the Prime Minister." When asked why Sharif had not mentioned the Qatari letter in his 16 May speech, Butt replied, 'Those were not legal testimonials, rather mere political statements." Expressing inability to furnish a "40-year-old" money trail, Butt explained that business families at the time conducted transactions over parchis, slips of paper. A second letter written by Al Thani was produced on 26 January 2017, clarifying that the "investment was made by way of provision of cash which was common practice in the Gulf region at the time of the investment. It was also, given the longstanding relationship between my father and Mr. Sharif, a customary way for them to do business between themselves."

=== Fresh hearings ===
Following the superannuation and retirement of Chief Justice Jamali in December, a new bench headed by Justice Khosa was formed to hear the case afresh. The bench retained justices Sh. Azmat Saeed and Ijaz-ul-Ahsan, and included justices Ejaz Afzal Khan and Gulzar Ahmed. The Sharif family also reshuffled its legal team: Butt and Sheikh were replaced with Makhdoom Ali Khan, Shahid Hamid, and Salman Akram Raja. The move came following widespread criticism over the team's handling of the case, and the Qatari letter's introduction. On the petitioners' side, lead counsel Hamid Khan too recused himself from arguing the case, claiming, "I can contest a case in the court, but am unable to indulge in a media war" after media reports surfaced that the party was unsatisfied with his performance. Fresh hearings resumed on 4 January 2017 with the reconstituted bench, new defence counsel, and a truncated petitioner's side.

=== Petitioner's case ===
The PTI's case was relitigated entirely by Bokhari, alongside Maleeka Bokhari and Akbar Hussain. Bokhari referred to interviews with different members of the Sharif family, highlighting that each gave differing versions of the ownership structure of the London properties. He argued that the Sharif family had failed to present any record regarding banking transactions, or refer to trust deeds or the Qatari connection earlier. He maintained that Maryam Nawaz had declared her taxable income as zero in tax returns, and remained a dependent on her father. He added that Hussain Nawaz had given Rs. 810 million to his father, without any of it being taxed.

Bokhari also highlighted the National Accountability Bureau's failure to pursue its own reference filed against Hudaibiya Paper Mills in 2000, implicating the Sharif family and Ishaq Dar in money laundering in the late 1990s.

=== Defence case ===
Sharif's lawyer Makhdoom Ali Khan, appeared as lead counsel, assisted by Saad Hashmi and Sarmad Hani. Makhdoom quoted the court's own decision on Article 62 (1)F of the Constitution, under which the petitioners sought Sharif's disqualification, as "a nightmare of interpretations and feast of obscurities." Makhdoom distinguished the case from that of Yusuf Raza Gilani, who was disqualified as prime minister in 2012 for contempt of court. Dismissing the Gilani precedent, Makhdoom argued, "My Lords you need to look at the background and understand the context of this judgment." Regarding Maryam Nawaz's dependence status, Makdhoom maintained she was listed as the prime minister's dependent on tax forms because there was no other column on the sheet.

To illustrate that it was not difficult to transport 12 million dirhams in cash, Hassan and Hussain Nawaz's counsel Salman Akram Raja placed the novels War and Peace and The Brothers Karamazov on top of each other, demonstrating that the thickness of both books, amounting to over 3,000 pages, would be the same as two million dirhams in cash.

=== FBR and NAB ===
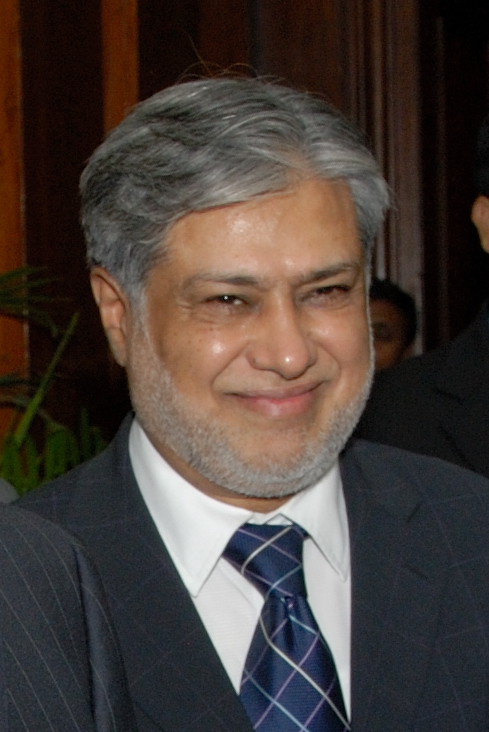
The case shifted focus to the Hudaibiya reference, involving Ishaq Dar's confession "under duress".

Throughout the case, the court questioned the non-functioning of state institutions in pursuing the Panama affair. Muhammad Irshad, Chairman of the Federal Board of Revenue informed the court that notices had been issued to 343 individuals following the Panama Papers leaks, and that Hassan, Hussain and Maryam Nawaz had responded to the notices. FBR lawyer Mohammad Waqar Rana said that no immediate steps had been taken in pursuance of the Panama scandal, arguing that separate laws and institutions were available for money laundering cases. "So in other words, what you are saying is that the FBR did not take any steps regarding money laundering?" Justice Gulzar observed. The FBR failed to satisfy the court over actions taken. "Thank you very much for not assisting the court", Justice Khosa admonished the FBR side.

The NAB (National Accountability Bureau) was represented by Chairman Qamar Zaman Chaudhry and Prosecutor General Waqas Qadeer Dar. During their submissions, the case shifted focus to the Hudaibiya criminal reference filed by NAB earlier. The reference was based on a confession by Ishaq Dar in 2000, admitting to laundering $14.86 million for the Sharif family. Dar had been placed under house arrest at the time by the military regime of Pervez Musharraf, and maintained the confession had been acquired under duress. The case was quashed by the Lahore High Court in 2014, when Dar was finance minister. "There are reservations regarding NAB's failure to register an appeal", the bench remarked. "When a criminal gets bail in a case of petty theft, NAB registers an appeal. This is a case worth millions and no appeal was registered", Justice Khosa observed. Chaudhry restated his decision not to register an appeal. Justice Saeed warned the NAB team to "be prepared to face serious consequences".

=== Attorney-general's submissions ===
The attorney-general for Pakistan, Ashtar Ausaf Ali, was put on notice to assist the court on 22 February 2017. Ausaf, with Asad Rahim Khan, Salaar Khan, and Shahzaib Khan submitted that anyone could file an appeal against the Lahore High Court's decision in the Hudaibiya reference, let alone NAB. Justice Saeed commented that NAB had "died in front of us yesterday". Ausaf further submitted that the prime minister did not have immunity in Code of Criminal Procedure cases under the Constitution. Ausaf was warned "not to become a party to the case" but assist the court.

=== Final submissions ===
Following Bokhari's rebuttal to the defence case, the petitioners appeared before the bench on 23 February 2017, including Imran Khan, Siraj-ul-Haq, and Sheikh Rashid Ahmad. The court reserved its judgment on that day.

=== Verdict ===
The secret of a great success for which you are at a loss to account is a crime that has never been found out, because it was properly executed

— The opening statement of the detailed Panama Case verdict; quoting French novelist and playwright, Honoré de Balzac.

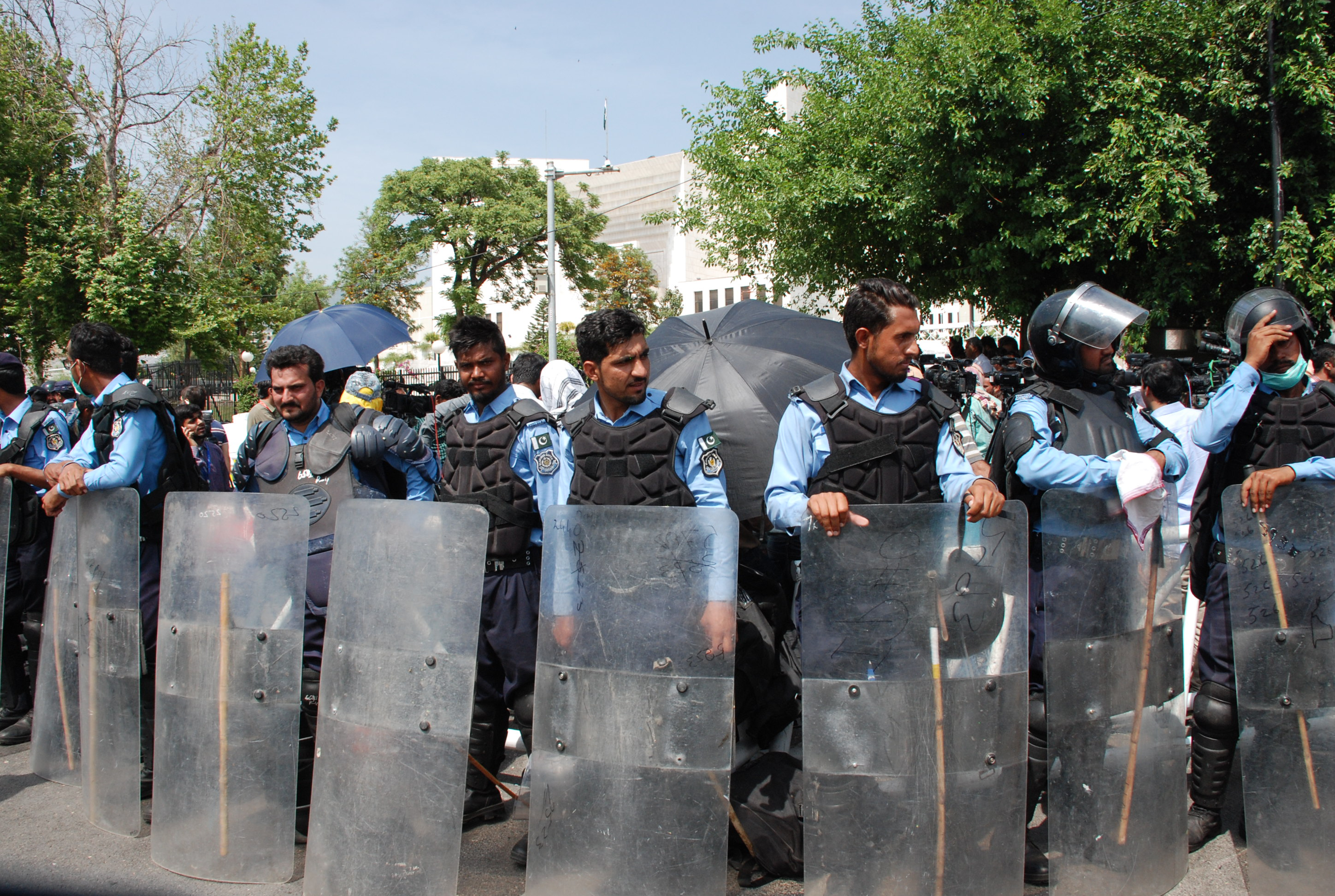
Policemen deployed during verdict.

The verdict in the case was announced at 2:00 p.m. PST on 20 April 2017. The Supreme Court in a 3–2 decision ruled that there was insufficient evidence to order Sharif's removal from office, but ordered further investigation into corruption allegations. The court ordered the formation of a joint investigation team (JIT) under a three-member special bench, which was later known as the JIT implementation bench. The two dissenting judges on the bench, Justice Asif Saeed Khosa and Justice Gulzar Ahmed, were of the opinion that Sharif had not been honest to the nation and should be disqualified from office.

The Panama Case JIT had powers to investigate all respondents and related parties, including the prime minister, and was ordered to complete its investigation within 60 days and present its findings to the Supreme Court every 15 days.

The detailed, 540-page verdict in the case was released on April 20, 2017. It was primarily authored by Justice Ejaz Afzal Khan and was noted for its harsh criticism of state investigative institutions, NAB and the FIA, as well as the government for their handling of the Panama Papers leaks. It chastised the defendants for not being 'completely honest with the court'.

== Joint investigation team ==
=== Members ===
Under the ruling of the Supreme Court a three-member special implementation bench supervised the JIT, headed by Justice Ejaz Afzal Khan and including Justice Sheikh Azmat Saeed and Justice Ijazul Ahsan. The JIT was formally constituted by the Supreme Court's implementation bench on 6 May 2017. It comprised six members, with the head from FIA:

Name	Organization	Post
Wajid Zia	Federal Investigation Agency	Additional Director General (Immigration)
Ameer Aziz	State Bank of Pakistan	Managing Director (NIBAF)
Bilal Rasool	Securities and Exchange Commission of Pakistan	Executive Director
Irfan Naeem Mangi	National Accountability Bureau	Director General (NAB, Balochistan)
Brigadier (r) Nauman Saeed	Inter-Services Intelligence	Director (Internal Security)
Brigadier Kamran Khurshid	Military Intelligence	–

=== Authority and functioning ===
The JIT members were given the authority to engage and associate local and/or foreign experts to facilitate the investigation of Sharif family's offshore assets. The team also received all powers granted by laws relating to investigation, including those available in the Code of Criminal Procedure, 1898, National Accountability Bureau Ordinance, 1999 and the Federal Investigation Agency Act, 1975. The directive also stated that the JIT was acting at the direction of the Supreme Court, and all executive authorities in Pakistan must assist and cooperate with the team.

The JIT headquarters was in the Federal Judicial Academy, Islamabad, with a working budget of Rs. 20 million. The team was required to submit reports to the Supreme Court fortnightly and to complete its investigations within 60 days of formation.

=== Scope of investigation ===
The scope of the JIT's investigation included the following ten points, as outlined by the Special Bench of the Supreme Court:

1. How did Gulf Steel come into being?
  1. What led to its sale?
  2. What happened to its liabilities?
  3. Where did its sale proceeds end up?
  4. How did they reach Jeddah, Qatar, and the UK?
2. Whether respondent numbers 7 and 8 (Hussain and Hassan Nawaz Sharif), in view of their tender ages, had the means in the early nineties to possess and purchase the London flats?
3. Whether the sudden appearance of al-Thani's letter is a myth or reality?
4. How bearer shares crystallized into the flats?
5. Who, in fact, is the real and beneficial owner of Nescoll Limited and Nielsen Enterprises.
6. How did Hill Metals Establishment come into existence?
7. Where did the money for Flagship Investment Limited and other companies set up/taken over by respondent number 8 (Hassan Nawaz Sharif) come from?
  1. Where did the working capital for such companies come from?
8. Where do the large sums, running into millions (Rs. 810 million), gifted by respondent number 7 (Hussain Nawaz Sharif) to respondent number 1 (Nawaz Sharif) drop in from?

=== JIT report and recommendations ===
Despite controversies, on 10 July 2017, JIT submitted a 275-page report in the Supreme Court. The report requested NAB to file a reference against Sharif, his daughter Maryam, and his sons under section 9 of National Accountability Ordinance. JIT found that Sharif, his sons and his daughter Maryam Nawaz could not justify their income and assets, adding that Maryam Nawaz had been proved the beneficial owner of Nielsen and Nescoll. The report further stated that Maryam was involved in falsifying evidence before the Supreme Court. The basis for this was the use of the Calibri font, first released to the public in January 2007, in documents said to be from 2006. Among other critical findings was the discovery of an offshore company, FZE Capital, managed by Nawaz Sharif until 2014, and the complete lack of supporting record in the United Arab Emirates related to the sale of Gulf Steel Mill, important to the case as it formed the basis of the 'Qatari letter' money trail.

== Final verdict ==
Following the JIT report to the court on 10 July 2017, the Supreme Court began to hear arguments a week later. On 21 July 2017, the court concluded the hearings and reserved its judgement. On 28 July 2017, the court announced its unanimous decision and disqualified the prime minister from holding public office, finding that he had been dishonest in not disclosing his employment and having failed to disclose his un-withdrawn receivables constituting assets in the Dubai-based Capital FZE company in his nomination papers. The court also ordered National Accountability Bureau to file a reference against Sharif, his family and his former finance minister Ishaq Dar, corruption charges.

== Aftermath ==
Following the verdict, Nawaz Sharif was disqualified from serving as prime minister, and also as leader of the National Assembly. The NAB was ordered by the court to investigate corruption charges against Sharif, his three children and his son-in-law. Sharif was subsequently barred from public office for life, after the Supreme Court held in Sami Ullah Baloch v. Abdul Karim Nousherwani that electoral disqualification under Article 62(1)(f) would continue in perpetuity.

In response to the apex court's recommendation, NAB filed three references against the former prime minister. They pertained to Avenfield flats in London, Flagship Investment offshore company, and the former Al-Azizia Steel Mill respectively. The case would now proceed in an accountability court of the Islamabad circuit, under Judge Muhammad Bashir.

On 6 July 2018, the court sentenced Nawaz Sharif to 10 years imprisonment in the Avenfield reference. The sentence extended to his daughter Maryum Nawaz, and Son-in-Law Retired Captain Safdar, who were given 7 years and 1 year imprisonment respectively. Sharif and his family appealed against the verdict in the Islamabad High Court.

On 18 September 2018, Islamabad High Court suspended the verdict as, according to the presiding judge, Athar Minallah, NAB "was unable to prove a financial link between the former prime minister and the apartments in question".

On 24 December 2018, Sharif was acquitted by the accountability court in the Flagship Investment case due to dearth of evidence. He was, however, sentenced to 7 years imprisonment and fined Rs. 5 billion in the Al-Azizia Steel Mill case.

On 25 March 2019, Nawaz Sharif was granted a 6-week bail on medical grounds by the Supreme Court with the condition that any medical treatment he receives must be from within Pakistan. 4 weeks later, on 25 April 2019, Sharif filed a review petition in the apex court, pleading to grant him "permanent bail" on the basis of a fresh medical report that stated he suffers from "acute anxiety and depression that will lead to sudden death". He also requested the court to allow him to go abroad for medical treatment. Both requests were turned down, and Nawaz was put back in jail on 7 May.

Meanwhile, his appeal against the Al-Azizia sentencing remains subjudice in the Islamabad High Court.

=== Election of a new prime minister ===
The new election for prime minister took place on 1 August 2017.

←2013	1 August 2017	2018→
Candidate	Party	Votes Obtained
Required majority →		172 out of 342
Shahid Khaqan Abbasi	PMLN	221
Naveed Qamar	PPP	47
Sheikh Rasheed Ahmad	AML	33
Sahabzada Tariq Ullah	JI	4
Abstentions		<36

== See also ==
- Fake accounts case
