= 2023 PDM sit-in =

2023 PDM Sit-in
- Date: 15 May 2023 – ongoing
- Location: Islamabad, Pakistan
- Methods: Sit-in protest

Lead figures
Pakistan Democratic Movement (PDM); Jamiat Ulema-e-Islam-Fazal (JUI-F)	

The Pakistan Democratic Movement (PDM) organised a sit-in protest and demonstration outside the Pakistan Supreme Court in May 2023 in the Pakistani capital city Islamabad. The ongoing dispute between the Pakistani government and the judiciary erupted into a sit-in protest of what were allegedly "undue favours" given to the former prime minister Imran Khan. The Jamiat Ulema-e-Islam (F) (JUI-F) party, one of the 13 members of the government coalition, the Pakistan Democratic Movement, was primarily in charge of the demonstration, which got underway since 15 May 2023.

== Background ==
Since earlier in the year when differences erupted over the timing of provincial elections, tensions between the government and the court have been escalating. Imran Khan was arrested in a false corruption case, but the situation worsened after the Supreme Court said on 9 May 2023 that it was "illegal." Khan was granted protection from further arrest until a later date as a result of this ruling, which allowed for his release on bail on 12 May. Bushra Bibi, Khan's wife, was also given bail in the same case until 23 May. The ruling parties have accused the judiciary of bias in favour of Khan, their chief political rival, as a result of these developments.

On 15 May 2023, the ruling coalition assembled in parliament and issued a motion accusing Pakistan's Chief Justice Umar Ata Bandial of "misconduct." Along with the sit-in demonstration outside the Supreme Court by pro-government protesters, this unusual resolution against the chief judge in parliament indicates the escalating hostilities between the executive branch and the judiciary.

== Reactions ==
Imran Khan was allegedly given preferential treatment by the judiciary, according to the ruling coalition, especially Prime Minister Shehbaz Sharif. Sharif referred to this as a "death of justice" and emphasised what he believed to be unfair justice practises.

Imran Khan was invited to court for a hearing rather than summoned, according to Federal Information Minister Marriyum Aurangzeb, who also backed the courts. She criticised the Supreme Court's rulings and said that they were biassed in Khan's favour. She also claimed that the Supreme Court had some influence over the Islamabad High Court, which gave Khan bail.

The niece of Prime Minister Shehbaz Sharif and a prominent member of the Pakistan Muslim League-Nawaz (PML-N) party, Maryam Nawaz Sharif, expressed her concerns on the judiciary's supposed contribution to the demise of the nation. She blasted Chief Justice Bandial and claimed that the court had helped Imran Khan further his political aspirations. She demanded that democracy be strengthened and that there be fair political competition.
