= 2018 Pakistani fake accounts scandal =

2018 Pakistani corruption case

- Court: Supreme Court of Pakistan
- Full case name: Fake accounts case

The 2018 Pakistani fake accounts scandal is being heard by the Supreme Court of Pakistan (SCP) under which former President of Pakistan Asif Ali Zardari, his sisters Faryal Talpur and Azra Fazal Pechuho, Zardari's aide Khawaja Anver Majid and his sons Khawaja Niymar Majeed, Khawaja Mustafa Majeed, Abdul Ghani Majeed, and Ali Kamal Majeed are accused of money laundering through 29 fake accounts registered in Summit Bank, Sindh Bank, and United Bank Limited under the names of people who themselves were not aware of those accounts. Others being investigated are Sara Tareen Majeed, Khawaja Kamal Majeed, Khawaja Mustafa Zulqarnain Majeed, and Saima Ali Majeed.

Khawaja Anwar Majeed, Khawaja Niymar Majeed, Khawaja Mustafa Majeed, Abdul Ghani Majeed, and Ali Kamal Majeed are already under arrest since 10 August 2018. They were arrested from inside Supreme Court of Pakistan building after they appeared to defend themselves in a "Rs35 billion fake accounts case".

== Background ==
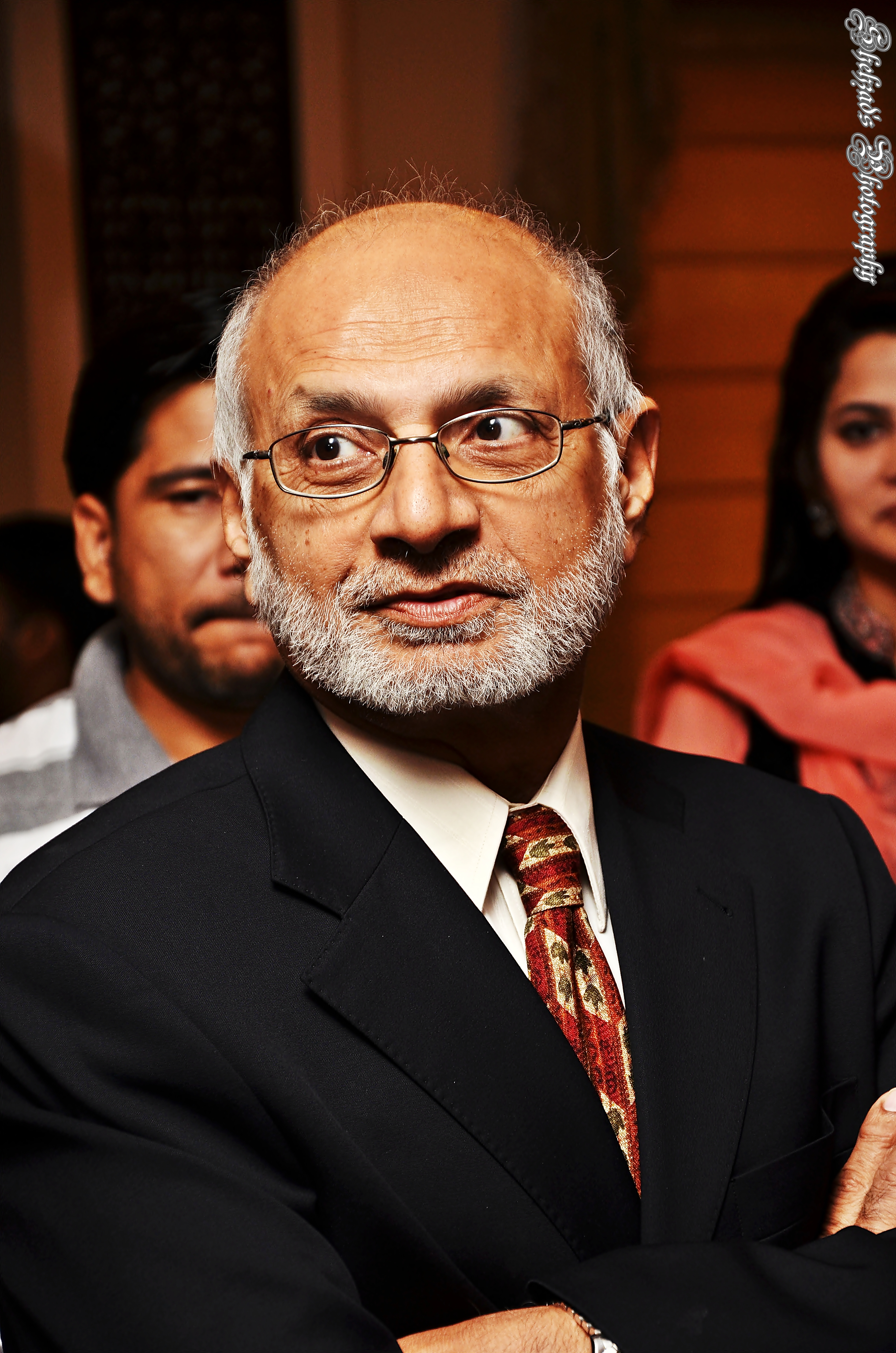
Hussain Lawai

This case was initially opened against Hussain Lawai in 2015 who is a former chairman of Pakistan Stock Exchange and a close associate of Zardari.

== Case facts ==
During court proceedings on 6 September 2018, two more companies M/s Landmarks and National Gases (Pvt) Limited (M/s NGS) were revealed in addition to already identified companies which were used to launder billions of rupees. M/s Landmarks is owned by Zardari, Talpur, and Pechuho in a partnership. Both companies were discovered from the hard disks which were recovered when Federal Investigation Agency (FIA) raided Khoski Sugar Mills owned by Omni Group, a franchise headed by Majeed.

M/s NGS is registered in the name of Muhammad Adil Khan. Its shares were being transferred to Sara Tareen Majeed and Khawaja Kamal Majeed since 2015, both of the Majeeds were able to gain the directorship of the company by 2018.

== Joint Investigation Team ==
The Supreme Court of Pakistan ordered creation of a joint investigation team (JIT) to investigate the charges against the accused on 6 September 2018. The JIT members are Imran Latif Minhas, Majid Hussain, Nauman Aslam, Muhammad Afzal, and Brigadier Shahid Pervaiz. The JIT is headed by Ehsan Sadiq who is an additional director general in FIA.

Minhas is a commissioner at the Regional Tax Office, Islamabad, Hussain is a joint director with the State Bank of Pakistan, Aslam is a director with the National Accountability Bureau, Afzal is a director with the Securities and Exchange Commission of Pakistan, and Pervaiz is associated with Inter-Services Intelligence, while contrary to the JIT for Panama Papers case, there is no representation from Military Intelligence in the JIT constituted for this case as of yet.

The JIT will derive its powers from all existing laws regarding investigations and inquiries including Anti Corruption Laws, National Accountability Ordinance's Code of Criminal Procedure, and Federal Investigation Agency Act of 1974. JIT will have at their disposal all the executive agencies and authorities to assist it where needed to complete this investigation. Pakistan Rangers is tasked with providing security to the JIT members and witnesses.

The JIT's task is to uncover all who are involved in this matter and collect fool-proof evidence against them so they can be effectively prosecuted. To complete this task, JIT will have at their disposal to garner services of any expert. It will be mandatory for this investigative body to keep SCP apprised about their progress in the investigation on "fortnightly basis".

=== Federal Tribunal Verdict ===
A federal tribunal in Karachi has cancelled benami property cases worth billions of rupees against several directors of the Omni Group, ruling that the Benami Transactions Act of 2017 cannot be used for deals made before the law existed. The two-member bench also noted that applying the law to older cases was "beyond legal authority."

The ruling covered multiple assets and companies linked to Omni Group directors Muhammad Younus Kodwai, Aslam Masood, Abdul Ghani Majid, and Khawaja Salman Younus. These included commercial plots in Karachi and shareholdings in Thatta Cement Company Limited.
