= Secretary of the Interior =

Secretary of the Interior may refer to:

- Secretary of the Interior (Mexico)
- Interior Secretary of Pakistan
- Secretary of the Interior and Local Government (Philippines)
- United States Secretary of the Interior

== See also ==
- Interior ministry for other countries
