= Aftab Sultan =

Chairman of the National Accountability Bureau

- آفتاب سلطان

Chairman of the National Accountability Bureau
- In office 21 July 2022 – 21 February 2023
- President: Arif Alvi
- Prime Minister: Shehbaz Sharif
- Preceded by: Javed Iqbal
- Succeeded by: Nazir Ahmed Butt

Director-general of the Intelligence Bureau
- In office June 2013 – April 2018
- Preceded by: Akhtar Hassan Khan Gorchani
- Succeeded by: Dr. Suleman Khan

Inspector-general of police of Punjab Police
- In office 1 April 2013 – 25 May 2013
- Preceded by: Haji Mohammad Habib ur Rehman
- Succeeded by: Khan Baig

Personal details
- Born: 1950 (age 75–76) Faisalabad District, Punjab, Pakistan

Aftab Sultan (born 1950 in the Arain family) is the former chairman of Pakistan's National Accountability Bureau. He succeeded Javed Iqbal on 21 July 2022.

Sultan is a law graduate from Punjab University Law College and has a postgraduate and master's degree from the University of Cambridge and the University of Edinburgh respectively. He joined the Police Service of Pakistan as an assistant superintendent of police in 1977 and was promoted to the office of superintendent of police in 1983. He was also Inspector-general of police of the Punjab Police from April 2013 to May 2013.

In 2010, during his tenure at the Intelligence Bureau (IB), he spearheaded a 5,000-page-long report on a case involving a multi-billion rupee Bank of Punjab loan scam. He became director-general of IB in June 2013 and held the post until April 2018.
