= Ashhad =

Ashhad (Arabic: اشهد), 'Name' is an Indian origin name for male but the word 'Ashhad' is an Arabic word which means 'witness' and can be use as first and surname.

It may refer to:

- Saiyed Saeed Ashhad, former justice of the Supreme Court of Pakistan
