= Fateh Khan Bandial =

Pakistani civil servant

Minister of Interior (caretaker)
- In office 23 July 1993 – 19 October 1993
- Prime Minister: Moeenuddin Ahmad Qureshi
- Preceded by: Chaudhry Shujat Hussain
- Succeeded by: Naseerullah Babar

Personal details
- Born: 1930
- Died: 9 November 2008
- Children: Umar Ata Bandial (son)

Fateh Khan Bandial (1930–2008) was a Pakistani civil servant who served as the Federal Secretary for Interior. After his retirement, he briefly served as the Caretaker Federal Interior Minister from 23 July 1993 to 19 October 1993. He was the father of Justice Umar Ata Bandial. He had also served as Deputy Commissioner of Lahore.

He died on 9 November 2008 and received a eulogy from Prime Minister Yousuf Raza Gilani.

Political offices
Preceded by Chaudhry Shujat Hussain	Minister of the Interior; 2013	Succeeded by Naseerullah Babar
