= Saiyed Saeed Ashhad =

Pakistani jurist

Justice of the Supreme Court of Pakistan
- Incumbent
- Assumed office 5 April 2005

Chief Justice of the Sindh High Court
- In office 28 April 2000 – 4 April 2005
- Preceded by: Syed Deedar Hussain Shah
- Succeeded by: Sabihuddin Ahmed

Personal details
- Born: October 8, 1943 (age 83) Lucknow, British India
- Profession: Jurist

Saiyed Saeed Ashhad (born 8 October 1943) is a Pakistani jurist who served as chief justice of the Sindh High Court from 2000 to 2005 and was later elevated as a justice of the Supreme Court of Pakistan.

== Early life and legal career ==
Ashhad was born on 8 October 1943 at Lucknow. He completed his legal education in 1963, obtaining an LL.B. degree from S. M. Law College, Karachi. He joined the bar as a pleader in September 1963, was enrolled as an advocate of the high court in November 1966, and practised law until January 1975.

During his years in practice, he conducted cases on behalf of Habib Bank Limited, Standard Bank Limited, United Bank Limited, the Pakistan Atomic Energy Commission, National Shipping Corporation, Pan-Islamic Steamship Limited, and the state. He also acted as assistant prosecutor and assistant government pleader.

== Judicial career ==
Ashhad was appointed district and sessions judge in January 1975 and later served in a number of judicial and administrative assignments, including presiding officer of the labour court, joint secretary and draftsman in the Sindh law department, judge for customs, taxation and anti-smuggling matters, chairman of the appellate tribunal, chairman of the drugs court, and judicial member of the tax appellate tribunal. He also served as district and sessions judge at Shikarpur, Sukkur, and Karachi.

He was elevated to the bench of the Sindh High Court on 11 January 1997. On 28 April 2000, he took oath as chief justice of the Sindh High Court, serving in that office until 4 April 2005. In December 2002, while serving as chief justice of the Sindh High Court, Ashhad took oath as acting governor of Sindh during the absence of Governor Mohammedmian Soomro.

In April 2005, Ashhad was elevated to the Supreme Court of Pakistan.
