= Reko Diq case =

Legal case in Pakistan

The Reko Diq case, officially known as the Tethyan Copper Company Pty Limited v. Islamic Republic of Pakistan is an ongoing legal case between the Government of Pakistan and the Tethyan Copper Company (TCC) over breach of the Australia–Pakistan Bilateral Investment Treaty (BIT) and illegal denial of mining rights to TCC at the Reko Diq Mine in Chagai District, Balochistan.

== Background ==
In 1993, Australian mining company BHP Billiton and the Balochistan government signed an agreement known as "Chaghi Hills Exploration Joint Venture Agreement (CHEJVA)" for the exploration and mining of copper and gold at the Reko Diq Mine. As per the agreement, BHP would hold 75 percent interest in the project while the government held the remaining 25 percent share on a joint-investment basis with 2 percent royalty payment. In April 2000, BHP handed over its obligations to a little known Australian company Mincor Resources, which was acquired by TCC in 2006.

In 2006, the legality of the agreement was challenged in the Balochistan High Court on the grounds that CHEJVA was executed contrary to the provisions of Pakistani law, the parties had failed to properly register CHEJVA, and the government of Balochistan had improperly relaxed local legislation to execute CHEJVA. However, the challenges were struck down by the High Court, which ruled that CHEJVA was legal and valid.

In February 2011, the TCC submitted a Mining Lease Application with the Balochistan government but it was rejected in November 2011 by the Balochistan government. The grounds for the rejection were that the smelting and refining should be done in Pakistan as opposed to the original agreement where smelting and refining would be done outside Pakistan, the royalty rates should be enhanced, the financial model should be reviewed and there should be more participation of the local population in the project.

== TCC seeks legal recourse ==
In November 2011, TCC took the matter to the World Bank Group's International Centre for Settlement of Investment Disputes (ICSID) to seek compensation of $11.43bn in damages after the Balochistan government turned down the leasing request from the company. According to TCC, it had already invested more than $220 million (Rs35 billion) by the time the provincial government unexpectedly refused to grant them the mining lease required to continue operations and claimed $11.43 billion in damages for the unexpected and sudden termination of the contract.

In January 2013, the Supreme Court of Pakistan declared the CHEJVA agreement as void, because Balochistan had exceeded its powers by signing it, and invalid, because it was contrary to public policy. It further stated that TCC had no legal rights to explore and mine in Reko Diq.

In July 2017, the ICSID decided that TCC had a legitimate expectation of receiving the mining lease because of Pakistan's assurances in the CHEJVA, its regulatory framework and direct assurances from its government officials and that there was no wrongdoing in CHEJVA – the ground on which the Supreme Court of Pakistan had terminated the agreement and that Pakistan was liable to pay damages. The ICSID also rejected over a dozen allegations of corruption made by the Pakistan government against TCC including one of former Balochistan chief minister Muhammad Aslam Khan Raisani having been offered a bribe of $1 million by TCC.

On 12 July 2019, the ICSID awarded $5.976bn (Rs950 billion) in damages to TCC. The ICSID found that Pakistan had unlawfully denied the TCC a lease to mine copper and gold deposits at the Reko Diq mine, breached Fair and equitable treatment standard (FET) and that the state had committed an unlawful expropriation under the Australia-Pakistan bilateral investment treaty.

On 20 November 2020, in order to enforce the $6bn award, TCC approached the High Court of Justice in the British Virgin Islands and sought attachment of Pakistani assets belonging to the Pakistan International Airlines Investment Ltd (PIAIL) — a company which is also incorporated in the British Virgin Islands.

On an appeal from Pakistan, the ICSID stayed the enforcement of the $6 billion awarded on the condition that Pakistan provides an "unconditional and irrevocable" bank guarantee or a letter of credit (LC) from a reputable international bank based outside of Pakistan, for 25% of the award, plus accrued interest as of the date of the decision. Pakistan was given 30 days to furnish the said security.

However, Pakistan missed the deadline and was unable to provide the bank guarantee or LC for 25% of the amount, as a result of which on 16 December 2020, the British Virgin Islands high court passed an order to attach some of PIAIL's assets. These included the company's interests in two hotels namely the Roosevelt Hotel in Manhattan, New York, and Scribe Hotel in Central Paris, and 40 per cent interest of PIA in a third entity, Minhal Incorporated.

As of December 2020 it was reported that Pakistan was actively negotiating with TCC and was hopeful of reaching an out-of-court settlement of the dispute.

On 16 January 2021, in view of ICSID's and British Virgin Islands high court's orders to attach PIA assets, and the London High Court's adverse orders in the Broadsheet case, Pakistan's Ministry of Foreign Affairs advised government entities to keep their foreign accounts and assets at a minimum to protect the country's foreign assets.

On 5 April 2021, the Secretary Aviation Division reported to a Committee headed by Deputy Chairman Planning Commission that the Roosevelt Hotel in New York, owned by Pakistan International Airlines (PIA) has been indirectly attached by a court in the Reko-Diq case. The high court of the British Virgin Islands (BVI) has voided the earlier verdict in the Reko Diq case.

In March 2022, Pakistan reached an out of court settlement with Barrick Gold for reviving and developing of the Reko Diq project. Canadian based Barrick Gold and Chilean Antofagasta had formed the consortium TCC. Antofagasta withdrew from the project. Barrick Gold would hold half the shares of the new project and the other half would be split between the Balochistan provincial and Pakistani federal companies. The project would see $10 Billion investment and creation of 8000 jobs. $11 Billion worth of penalties by ICSID and London court of Arbitration would be set aside. The government was expected to place the settlement before parliament and the supreme court.
