= Qamar Zaman Chaudhry =

Pakistani bureaucrat

Chaudhry Qamar Zaman قمرزمان (Urdu)

Chairman of the National Accountability Bureau
- In office 11 October 2013 – 10 October 2017
- President: Mamnoon Hussain
- Prime Minister: Nawaz Sharif
- Preceded by: Fasih Bokhari
- Succeeded by: Javaid Iqbal

Personal details
- Born: Qamar Zaman; 1950 (age 75–76)
- Occupation: Bureaucrat

Chaudhry Qamar Zaman is a retired Pakistani bureaucrat who served in BPS-22 grade as the Interior Secretary of Pakistan and ex-Chairman National Accountability Bureau (NAB).

== Chairman NAB ==
NAB, the country's top anti-graft watchdog, had almost become dysfunctional after the Supreme Court of Pakistan dismissed the then NAB chairman Fasih Bokhari through its 28 May 2013 judgment. Qamar Zaman has held several key positions in his career. Qamar Zaman was criticized in the local media after Supreme Court ordered an investigation of Qamar for his alleged involvement in a major corruption scandal. However, an internal inquiry carried out by his own agency did not lead to any formal charges against him in a court of law.

== Positions held in the past ==
- Interior Secretary of Pakistan.
- Education Secretary of Pakistan.
- Commissioner Lahore and Executive Director Higher Education Commission
- Chairman of Capital Development Authority (CDA).
- Chief Secretary of Azad Jammu and Kashmir.
