= 2023 Pakistan election delay case =

Political Dispute in Pakistan

2023 Pakistan Election Delay Case
- Court: Supreme Court of Pakistan

Case history
- Prior actions: Election Commission of Pakistan deferred the Punjab and Khyber Pakhtunkhwa elections from 30 April to 8 October 2023
- Subsequent action: Ongoing case

Court membership
- Judges sitting: Chief Justice of Pakistan Umar Ata Bandial, Justice Ijaz Ul Ahsan, Justice Munib Akhtar, Justice Amin-Ud-Din Khan, Justice Jamal Khan Mandokhail

Keywords
- Pakistan; Election Commission of Pakistan; Pakistan Tehreek-e-Insaf; postponement; legal dispute; Supreme Court

The 2023 Pakistan election delay case pertains to a legal dispute between the Pakistan Tehreek-e-Insaf (PTI) and the Election Commission of Pakistan (ECP) over the postponement of the Punjab and Khyber Pakhtunkhwa elections from April 30 to October 8, 2023. A five-member larger bench, led by Chief Justice of Pakistan (CJP) Umar Ata Bandial and comprising Justice Ijaz Ul Ahsan, Justice Munib Akhtar, Justice Amin-Ud-Din Khan, and Justice Jamal Khan Mandokhail, is currently hearing the case.

== Background ==
Following the ECP's decision to defer the elections due to financial and security concerns, the PTI approached the Supreme Court for a resolution. While the apex court was set to resume the hearing on 30 March 2023, Justice Aminuddin Khan recused himself after a Supreme Court order halted proceedings under Article 184(3).

== The case ==
The case's complexities stem from a 4-3 or 3-2 majority ruling on the Supreme Court's March 1 verdict, along with the government's need to maintain a peaceful political environment. Chief Justice of Pakistan Umar Ata Bandial has called on all political parties to guarantee cooperation for a fair electoral process.

The apex court has demanded that the ECP clarify the legal and factual questions posed by the PTI petition and ensure transparent elections. Moreover, the ECP's authority to nullify the election date set by the president has come under scrutiny, with Justice Munib Akhtar alleging that the ECP's decisions have impeded the Supreme Court's directives.

As the case continues, any further developments will decide the future of the 2023 Pakistan elections.
