= Syed Deedar Hussain Shah =

Pakistani jurist

Chairman of the National Accountability Bureau
- In office October 2010 – 2011
- Preceded by: Navid Ahsan
- Succeeded by: Fasih Bokhari

Chief Justice of the Sindh High Court

Member of the Provincial Assembly of Sindh
- In office 30 November 1988 – 6 August 1990
- In office 4 November 1990 – 19 July 1993

Personal details
- Born: 11 December 1939 Garhi Khuda Bakhsh, Larkana District, Sindh, Pakistan
- Died: January 2019 (aged 79) Ratodero, Pakistan
- Children: 6 (3 sons, 3 daughters)
- Education: Sindh University
- Profession: Jurist, politician

Syed Deedar Hussain Shah (1939–2019) was a Pakistani jurist and politician. He served as a chief justice of the Sindh High Court. He also served as the chairman of the National Accountability Bureau from 2010 to 2011.

== Early life and education ==
Shah was born on 11 December 1939, in Garhi Khuda Bakhsh, Larkana District, Sindh. He attended Sindh University, receiving a Bachelor of Arts in 1962 and a law degree in 1965.

== Career ==
Shah began his legal career by enrolling as an advocate for subordinate Courts with the West Pakistan Bar Council on 22 August 1967, and subsequently as an Advocate of the West Pakistan High Court on 23 August 1974.

Shah was a member of the District Council from 1979 to 1983, during which he chaired the Works Sub-Committee of the District Council, Larkana. He was also elected chairman of the Taluka Council, Ratodero from 1979 to 1983, and later served as a member of the District Council, Larkana from 1987 to 1991.

In 1988 Shah was elected as a member of the Provincial Assembly of Sindh, serving from 30 November 1988, to 6 August 1990, and again from 4 November 1990, to 19 July 1993.

In June 1994, Shah was appointed as an additional judge of the Sindh High Court, with subsequent regularization as a judge of the Sindh High Court.

In October 2010 Shah was appointed as the chairman of the National Accountability Bureau by Asif Ali Zardari.

== Personal life ==
Shah was married. He and his wife had three sons and three daughters.

Shah died in January 2019 and was buried in Ratodero.
