= Umar Ata Bandial =

Pakistani judge (born 1958)

- عمرعطا بندیال

28th Chief Justice of Pakistan
- In office 2 February 2022 – 16 September 2023
- Nominated by: Imran Khan
- Appointed by: Arif Alvi
- Preceded by: Gulzar Ahmed
- Succeeded by: Qazi Faez Isa

Justice of the Supreme Court of Pakistan
- In office 17 June 2014 – 16 September 2023
- Preceded by: Arif Hussain

Chief Justice of Lahore High Court
- In office 1 June 2012 – 16 June 2014
- Preceded by: Azmat Saeed
- Succeeded by: Imtiaz Ahmad

Justice of the Lahore High Court
- In office 4 December 2004 – 16 June 2014
- Preceded by: Muhammad Zafar Yasin
- Succeeded by: Chudhery Mushtaq Ahmad

Personal details
- Born: 17 September 1958 (age 68) Lahore, West Pakistan (present-day Punjab, Pakistan)
- Parent: Fateh Khan Bandial (father)
- Education: Aitchison College
- Alma mater: Columbia University (BA); University of Cambridge

Supreme Court of Pakistan, Islamabad.

Umar Ata Bandial (Urdu: عمر عطا بندیال, [ʊmər ətaː bənd̪jaːl]; born 17 September 1958) is a Pakistani jurist who served as the 28th Chief Justice of Pakistan from February 2022 to September 2023. He was appointed as the Chief Justice after the approval by President Arif Alvi on 13 January 2022. He assumed his office on 2 February 2022 and retired on 16 September 2023. Previously, Bandial served as a Justice of Lahore High Court from 1 June 2012 to 16 June 2014.

Bandial served as the Chief Justice of Pakistan for one year, six months, and 25 days from 2 February 2022, until his retirement on 16 September 2023.

== Early life and education ==
Bandial was born in 1958 in Lahore, Home town District Khushab West Pakistan, into a Punjabi Muslim family. In 1973, Bandial received his Senior Cambridge certificate from St Mary's Academy, Rawalpindi. He then enrolled in Aitchison College, Lahore, for his Higher Senior Cambridge certificate, which he received in 1975. He received his bachelor's degree in economics from Columbia University in 1979 and followed this with a Law Tripos degree from the University of Cambridge in 1981. He qualified as a Barrister-at-Law from Lincoln's Inn, London.

== Career ==
Bandial joined the Lahore High Court as an advocate in 1983. He also taught torts law and contract law at the Punjab University Law College in Lahore until 1987, after which he served on its Graduate Studies Committee. He then was made a Judge of the Lahore High Court. After a few years on 17 June 2014, he became a Judge of the Supreme Court of Pakistan.

=== Lahore High Court ===
He was elevated as a Judge of the Lahore High Court on 4 December 2004. He was one of the judges who refused to take an oath under the Provisional Constitutional Order, preferring to resign instead. He was restored as a LHC judge as a result of the Lawyers' Movement.

As a judge of the Lahore High Court, he presided over cases related to constitutional rights, civil and commercial disputes, and public interest. On 1 June 2012, he was appointed as the 41st Chief Justice of Lahore High Court. He served at that post until his appointment as a Supreme Court judge on 16 June 2014.

=== Supreme Court of Pakistan ===
Bandial's appointment as the Chief Justice of Pakistan (CJP) was approved by Alvi on 13 January 2022. He was sworn in on 2 February 2022, in a ceremony at Aiwan-e-Sadr.

In his first month, he initiated reforms in various organs of the Supreme Court, including the Case Management System, to ensure provision of speedy justice. He reorganized the bodies that dealt with administrative and judicial powers, including the building committee, record enrolment committee, Supreme Court research affairs branch, and law clerk programme. He appointed Qazi Faez Isa, Sardar Tariq Masood, Ijazul Ahsan, Mazhar Alam, and Sajjad Ali Shah as the monitoring judges of the provincial anti-terrorism courts of Balochistan, Islamabad, Punjab, Khyber Pakhtunkhwa, and Sindh, respectively.

As the CJP, Justice Bandial was elected as chairman of the Supreme Judicial Council, Judicial Commission of Pakistan, and Law and Justice Commission. The structure of these three bodies was changed completely.

In his first month as CJP, the Supreme Court decided a record 1,761 cases in an effort to address the issue of pendency. Senior lawyers noted the discipline in the fixation of cases and formation of benches.

In 2022, he was named among the Time 100 most influential people.

== Controversies ==
=== Crisis in Judiciary ===
Justice Mandokhel refused to sit on a Supreme Court bench with the chief justice and the other bench members due to not being consulted before constituting the bench. Justice Minallah regreted apex court's conduct, terming it akin to 'advancing political strategies'. He called for 'introspection' as the country verged on constitutional crisis. Justice Minallah, who was among those judges of the apex court who had rejected the suo motu notice taken by the CJP Bandial regarding the delay in polls in Khyber Pakhtunkhwa and Punjab, said that by entertaining the petitions and suo motu jurisdiction, the court would be "unjustifiably undermining the independence of two provincial high courts." Judges must not be seen as 'politicians in robes', said Justice Minallah.

Foreign Minister Bilawal Bhutto Zardari, who is also the Chairman of PPP, called Bandial's conduct "judicial dictatorship", which he said was not acceptable. He said "If there is no difference among the SC judges, then what is the issue in constituting a full court? You can save the country from the constitutional crisis by making a full court." The coalition government asked CJP Bandial to first put his "own house in order" by sitting down with fellow judges before lecturing politicians to sit together.

Former Sindh High Court Bar Association president Salahuddin Ahmed told Dawn that he is also of the opinion that the current conflict within the judiciary is fast heading towards a 1997-like situation.

Chief Justice of Pakistan (CJP) Umar Ata Bandial has reached out to his fellow judges to put an end to the division in the Supreme Court as the controversy surrounding the top court's verdict on election delay case in Punjab and Khyber Pakhtunkhwa (KP) continues to deepen.

=== Resolution against Judiciary ===
On 28 March 2023, the Pakistani government unanimously passed a controversial resolution against the Judiciary. The resolution, which was introduced by Information Minister Maryam Aurangzeb, rejects the Judiciary's interference in the legislative process. On 6 April 2023, The National Assembly passed a resolution to reject the decision of the three-member bench of the Supreme Court (SC) — which had instructed the Election Commission of Pakistan (ECP) to conduct snap polls in the country.

=== Justice Naqvi Controversy ===
First time in the Pakistan History, The Pakistan Bar Council (PBC), the apex regularity body of lawyers, on Friday filed a complaint of misconduct against Supreme Court's Justice Sayyed Mazahar Ali Akbar Naqvi in the Supreme Judicial Council (SJC).

Two judges of the Supreme Court, Justice Qazi Faez Isa and Justice Sardar Tariq Masood, have written to the Supreme Judicial Council (SJC), urging the top judicial body to initiate proceedings on complaints of alleged "misconduct and financial impropriety" against their fellow apex court judge, Justice Sayyed Mazahar Ali Akbar Naqvi.

However, the Supreme Judicial Council meeting was not yet called by Chief Justice Umar ata Bandial. The prime minister also pointedly asked the chief justice to respond to the allegation of corruption against a fellow judge."I want to ask the chief justice, that a judge against whom there have been serious allegations, what message do you want to send to the nation by having him sit alongside you?" the premier said.

=== Disputed appointment of Registrar ===
The federal cabinet withdrew the services of Supreme Court Registrar Ishrat Ali after a letter from Justice Qazi Faez Isa that sought the removal of the circular by the registrar.

Justice Qazi Mentioned in the letter that the bureaucratic holding of the office of the Registrar violates Article 175 (3) of the Constitution, which mandates the complete separation of the Judiciary and the Executive. Justice Qazi stated that Registrar's conduct demonstrates that he does not have the requisite competence, ability, and understanding to hold the office of the Registrar. However, Pakistan's Chief Justice Umar Ata Bandial Tuesday directed the registrar of the Supreme Court to not relinquish the charge of his office.

=== Calls for resignation ===
The government asked Chief Justice Umar Ata Bandial's resignation on Friday, a day after the PDM-led federal government issued a resolution opposing the Supreme Court's (SC) decision mandating elections in Punjab on 14 May 2023. In a confrontational press conference, the Federal Minister of Information, Marriyum Aurangzeb, sought the resignation of Chief Justice Umar Ata Bandial, asserting that the recent case was not about elections but rather bench fixing.

Nawaz Sharif, the leader of the Pakistan Muslim League-Nawaz (PML-N), demanded the Chief Justice of Pakistan quit immediately and accused him of promoting the PTI's agenda. Sharif criticised the CJ in a tweet on Friday, asserting that courts should help nations escape crises rather than drive them into them. He further accused the chief justice of supporting the PTI's agenda and imposing the minority's viewpoint over the majority's decision in the Punjab election case.

Amid a deepening political and constitutional crisis, the Khyber Pakhtunkhwa Bar Council joined the demand for Bandial's resignation as the CJP, asking the top judge to step down as he had become "controversial".

Another complaint against four Supreme Court (SC) judges, including Bandial, was filed on Monday at the Supreme Judicial Council (SJC) seeking their removal from office. The other three SC judges named in the complaint were Munib Akhtar, Ijazul Ahsan and Mazhar Ali Naqvi have been named in the complaint.

=== SC (Practice and Procedure) Bill 2023 ===
The government presented a bill in the National Assembly as PM Shehbaz Sharif accused the top court of creating 'political instability'. The Supreme Court set up a larger bench against bill recently passed to curtail powers of Chief Justice.

However, the legal fraternity strongly reacted to the composition of the eight-member larger bench of the Supreme Court hearing “premature petitions” against the SC (Practice and Procedure) Bill 2023, saying that the selection of judges for this purpose itself reinforced the justification for the discretionary powers of the chief justice of Pakistan to be regulated. Advocate Salar Khan pointed out that with the predictability of this bench, Bandial had himself made the best argument for adoption of the very same law that this petition had challenged.

Coalition parties rejected 'controversial' SC bench formed to take up SC bill. "There is a conflict of interest as bill passed against CJP's powers is being heard by himself," the law minister said.

SC puts on hold non-existent law in pre-emptive strike.

=== Alleged audio leak of Bandial's mother-in-law ===
On 23 April 2023, a supposedly recorded phone call between Pakistan Tehreek-e-Insaf's lawyer Khawaja Tariq Rahim's wife Rafia Tariq and Chief Justice Bandial's mother-in-law Mahjabeen Noon went viral. They reportedly discussed their support for the chief justice of the Supreme Court and their desire for immediate elections. The women allegedly voiced anger towards the PDM's government during the claimed call.

The PDM government later formed a judicial commission to investigate the leaked audio call and requested Bandial to step down from the bench in order to guarantee an impartial inquiry.

== See also ==
- Supreme Court of Pakistan
- Lahore High Court
