= Azmat Saeed =

Pakistani judge (1954–2025)

Sheikh Azmat Saeed

Justice of the Supreme Court of Pakistan
- In office 2012–2019

Chief Justice of Lahore High Court
- In office 2011–2012
- Succeeded by: Umar Ata Bandial

Personal details
- Born: 28 August 1954 Rawalpindi, West Punjab, Pakistan
- Died: 12 February 2025 (aged 70) Lahore, Punjab, Pakistan
- Education: Punjab University Law College

Sheikh Azmat Saeed (Urdu: عظمت سعید; 28 August 1954 – 12 February 2025) was a judge of the Supreme Court of Pakistan. He served the judiciary in various capacities and was part of several significant cases and decisions in Pakistan's legal history.

== Early life and career ==
Saeed commenced his legal career in Rawalpindi in 1978 following the completion of his LL.B degree. He gained experience by working in different law chambers before eventually establishing his own independent practice in Lahore in 1980. Subsequently, in 1981, he was enrolled as an Advocate of the Lahore High Court and also as an Advocate of the Supreme Court of Pakistan.

=== Appointment as Supreme Court judge ===
Saeed was sworn in as a permanent judge of the Supreme Court on 1 June 2012. The oath-taking ceremony was presided over by the Chief Justice of Pakistan at the time, Justice Iftikhar Muhammad Chaudhry. Before assuming this role, Saeed held the position of Chief Justice of the Lahore High Court.

=== Acting Chief Justice of Pakistan ===
In July 2019, Saeed took on the role of acting Chief Justice of Pakistan.

== Controversies and legal challenges ==
A petition was filed to challenge Saeed's assignment as the leader of the inquiry committee for the Broadsheet LLC scandal. Nevertheless, the petition was rejected.

In another case, the government retracted Saeed's selection as an arbitrator for resolving a conflict concerning Rs 52 billion with 12 independent power producers (IPPs) established under the 2002 policy.

== Retirement and post-retirement work ==
Saeed concluded his tenure at the Supreme Court in 2019 and was commemorated with full-court reference within the Supreme Court.

During his farewell address, Saeed emphasized the significance of maintaining an impartial judiciary and expressed his desire for an uninterrupted provision of justice without any compromises.

Following his retirement, Saeed was appointed to lead the government's inquiry committee tasked with investigating the Broadsheet LLC scandal.

== Death ==
Saeed died after a lengthy illness on 12 February 2025, at the age of 70, at a hospital in Lahore, where he had been receiving treatment for some time.

== Recognition ==
At a farewell ceremony for Saeed, Chief Justice Asif Saeed Khosa described him as a valuable asset to the superior judiciary who had authored numerous significant judgements and clarified many ambiguous issues during his tenure.
