= Nazir Ahmed Butt =

Pakistani Army general

Lieutenant general Nazir Ahmed Butt HI(M)
- نذیر احمد بٹ

Chairman of the National Accountability Bureau
- Incumbent
- Assumed office 4 March 2023
- President: Arif Alvi
- Prime Minister: Shehbaz Sharif

Personal details
- Born: Nazir Ahmed
- Education: National Defence University
- Awards: Hilal-i-Imtiaz

Military service
- Allegiance: Pakistan
- Branch/service: Pakistan Army
- Years of service: 1983–2018
- Rank: Lieutenant general
- Unit: Frontier Force Regiment
- Commands: XI Corps; National Defence University; Pakistan Military Academy; Communications and Information Technology, GHQ

Nazir Ahmed Butt HI(M) is a retired lieutenant general in the Pakistan Army who served as the 30th president of the National Defence University from 11 April 2016 to 19 December 2016. He also served as Pakistan's military attaché in the US, and military secretary to the prime minister of Pakistan. On 4 March 2023, the government appointed him chairman of the National Accountability Bureau.

== Early life and education ==
Nazir Ahmed Butt is of Kashmiri ethnicity. His father was a colonel while his brother is also a retired colonel from the army. He graduated from the Command and Staff College, and the National Defence University, Pakistan.

== Military career ==
He was commissioned in the Frontier Force Regiment of the Pakistan Army in 1983. Prior to his appointment as commander of the XI Corps (Peshawar Corps) in December 2016, he served as commandant of the Pakistan Military Academy (PMA), and commanded an infantry division in the Federally Administered Tribal Areas (FATA).

He was promoted to lieutenant general in 2014, and was subsequently appointed inspector general of Communications and Information Technology at the General Headquarters. Before retiring from the service in 2018, he also commanded a military formation in South Waziristan as a major general.

== Post-retirement ==
=== Chairman NAB ===
On 4 March 2023, he was appointed chairman of the National Accountability Bureau. During his tenure, Butt oversaw a marked increase in recoveries. According to official figures cited in 2025, the bureau recovered approximately Rs. 8.4 trillion within two and a half years, significantly exceeding the cumulative recoveries of Rs. 884 billion made over the previous 23 years. The total recoveries attributed to NAB since its establishment consequently rose to around Rs. 9.28 trillion. Butt’s tenure has also been associated with institutional reforms aimed at improving efficiency and focus. Following amendments to the National Accountability Ordinance in 2022, which limited NAB’s jurisdiction and raised the financial threshold for cases, the bureau shifted toward pursuing fewer but higher-value cases requiring stronger evidentiary standards. This approach was presented by the leadership as a transition from a broad-based enforcement model to a more targeted, impact-oriented strategy. Officials under Butt have argued that these reforms, combined with increased recoveries, represent an effort to restore public confidence in the institution and address long-standing criticisms of its performance.
