= Broadsheet case =

The Broadsheet case, officially known as the Broadsheet vs Islamic Republic of Pakistan and NAB case, is an ongoing legal case related to the non-payment of service fees to asset recovery company 'Broadsheet LLC' by the Government of Pakistan.

== Background ==
On 20 July 2000, on the orders of the Attorney General's Office and the then President General Pervez Musharraf, the National Accountability Bureau (NAB) of Pakistan hired two asset recovery companies, namely the Isle of Man registered Broadsheet LLC and UK based International Asset Recovery (IAR), to investigate and track the illegally accumulated wealth of Pakistani politicians and other influential figures including the former Prime Minister of Pakistan Nawaz Sharif. As per the agreement signed, the asset recovery companies would get 20% of the value of the assets thus recovered as service fees.

== Case history ==
In 2003, the NAB terminated the agreement with Broadsheet, after making settlements with Nawaz Sharif and others. However, Broadsheet claimed that it had not been informed of the settlements and it was entitled to service fees on assets it had recovered. As a result, the company filed a case of arbitration with the London Court of International Arbitration (LCIA) over non-payment of its service fees. The Broadsheet company sent a notice to the Pakistan government claiming damages of $580 million. It claimed that NAB had signed an agreement to investigate 200 individuals and the Pakistan government owed it $100 million for investigating and recovery from 6 individuals. It also said that it had delivered proofs of Nawaz Sharif's London apartments in 2000 and demanded $21.5 million for delivering these proofs.

In the meanwhile, the Broadsheet company went bankrupt and was acquired by Kaveh Moussavi, an Iranian and former head of public interest law at Oxford University. The original owner of Broadsheet, Jerry James, registered another company in Colorado, which was also named "Broadsheet".

In May 2008, the NAB reached an agreement with the Colorado registered Broadsheet and paid it an amount of $5 million.

However, it was realised that the wrong company had been paid, when the Isle of Man registered Broadsheet continued to pursue the arbitration case on the basis that the payment was due to the original company Broadsheet, and not its owner Jerry James, and hence the payment made by NAB had no legal standing in the case between this company and the Pakistani state.

The case hearings commenced in January 2016, and the Pakistan government lost the case in August of the same year. The LCIA upheld Broadsheet's arguments that Jerry James had no authority to act on behalf of the Isle of Man registered Broadsheet LLC. It further held that "Pakistan was liable to pay damages as NAB had wrongfully repudiated an asset recovery agreement with Broadsheet and committed a tort of civil conspiracy by entering into a sham settlement with a former Broadsheet executive".

In November 2018, the LCIA imposed a penalty of $17 million on NAB, along an additional $3 million in case cost. In March 2019 the court ordered the NAB to pay $20 million. However, the NAB and the Pakistani government failed to comply with the court order.

The Pakistan government appealed to the High Court of England and Wales against the LCIA arbitral award in favour of Broadsheet, on the ground that LCIA had failed to give sufficient reason on how it had valued the award in favour of Broadsheet. However, in July 2019 the court rejected the appeal and held that "an arbitration tribunal's failure to explain how it had valued a loss of chance claim did not of itself constitute a reason for the unsuccessful party to challenge the award under s.69 Arbitration Act 1996". It further held that Pakistan had unlawfully terminated its contract with Broadsheet.

In July 2020, Broadsheet also said that it would seize the assets of the Pakistan national cricket team which was in the UK at the time, though it was believed that would not be legally tenable as the Pakistan team is not representative of the Pakistan state or government but that of the Pakistan Cricket Board, an autonomous body.

On 17 December 2020, the London High Court ordered that $28.7 million, inclusive of interest, be debited from the accounts of the High Commission of Pakistan in London, with a deadline of 22 December to challenge the order and a deadline of 31 December to pay the penalty. However, the Pakistan government missed both the deadlines.

On 1 January 2021, Pakistan's federal cabinet approved the payment of the $28.7 million to Broadsheet while also declaring it would challenge the court order to debit money from the accounts of the High Commission of Pakistan in London. On 6 January 2021, an inter-ministerial meeting at the Pakistan Foreign Office was informed that even though the Pakistan government had sent several communications, the UK government did not inform the bank about the diplomatic immunity of the Pakistan High Commission accounts. On 16 January 2021, in view of the London High Court's orders on the Broadsheet case as well as the attachment of Pakistan held assets in the UK in the Reko Diq case verdict, Pakistan's Ministry of Foreign Affairs advised government entities to keep their foreign accounts and assets at a minimum in order to protect the country's foreign assets.

== Broadsheet inquiry commission ==
On 22 January 2021, the Federal Government appointed a one-man inquiry commission headed by former Supreme Court judge, Azmat Saeed Sheikh to probe into the Broadsheet scandal. However, the two major opposition parties of Pakistan – the Pakistan Muslim League (N) and the Pakistan Peoples Party – rejected the government's appointing of Justice (retd) Sheikh to the inquiry commission, citing his past affiliation with NAB as creating a "conflict of interest".

On 8 March it was reported that the Government's own branches the Ministry of Law, the Ministry of Finance and the Attorney General for Pakistan (AGP) office were not cooperating with the investigation and had not provided the relevant records for it.

On 22 March, the commission completed its investigation into the payment made to the British-based asset recovery firm Broadsheet LLC. In its report, the commission found that the payment record of $1.5 million (Rs234m) to the fake Broadsheet was missing. It found that the records for the payment had disappeared from the ministries of finance and law, the office of the attorney general as well as the High Commission of Pakistan in London. As per a private TV channel, the files containing the payment details had been stolen from these places.

== See also ==
- Reko Diq case
