= National Accountability Bureau =

Pakistan's anti-corruption agency

- قومی احتساب بیورو

Agency overview
- Formed: 1999; 27 years ago
- Preceding agency: Ehtesab Cell
- Jurisdiction: Pakistan
- Headquarters: G-5, Shahrah-i-Jamuriat, Islamabad.
- Agency executive: Lt Gen (retd) Nazir Ahmed Butt, Chairman
- Parent department: Autonomous
- Website: www.nab.gov.pk

The National Accountability Bureau (Urdu: قومی احتساب بیورو; abbreviated NAB) is Pakistan's anti-corruption agency. Its chairman is Nazir Ahmed Butt, a retired general.

== History ==
The Ehtesab Act, 1997 established an Ehtesab Cell, charged with the investigation and prosecution of corruption.

Under the National Accountability Ordinance, 1999, the NAB was established as the cell's successor, and given the additional responsibility of preventing and raising awareness of corruption. The NAB is also responsible for money-laundering investigations under the Anti-Money Laundering Act, 2010.

== Organization ==
The principal officers of the NAB are its Chairman and Prosecutor General. Its headquarters are in Islamabad. There are regional bureaus under Directors General in Rawalpindi, Lahore, Karachi, Quetta, Peshawar, Sukkur and Multan. There are four sub-offices (for Gwadar, Hyderabad, Gilgit and Baltistan, and Chamman) under Additional Directors.

The current senior management of NAB is as follows:-

Designation	Name of officer
Chairman NAB	Lt Gen (R) Nazir Ahmed Butt
Prosecutor General of Accountability	Sohail Nasir
Deputy Chairman NAB	Syed Ihtesham Qadir Shah
Director General (Operations)	Amjad Majeed Aulakh
Director General (SID, HQ)	Muhammad Tahir
Director General (Rawalpindi)	Muhammad Rizwan Khan (Director, OPS)
Director General (Lahore)	Add. IG Mirza Faran Baig
Director General (Karachi)	Addl. IG Shakeel Ahmed Durrani
Director General (KP)	Naveed Haider Zahid
Director General (Sukkur)	Muhammad Amir Butt
Director General (Multan)	Asim Lodhi
Director General (Headquarters)	Nauman Aslam
Director General (PACA)	Ghulam Safdar Shah
Director General (Awareness & Prevention)	Izhar Ahmed Awan
Director General (Human Resource Management)	Muhammad Imran Butt (Director, OPS)
Director General (Balochistan)	Niaz Hassan (Director, OPS)

The Federal Public Service Commission is responsible for recruitment of Assistant Directors. Newly recruited Assistant Directors attend a five to seven month 'Investigators Basic Induction Course' and are then posted to the central headquarters of the NAB or its regional bureaus.

The NAB's Forensic Science Lab was inaugurated by Qamar Zaman Chaudhry, then Chairman, on 20 October 2015. It assists investigations by offering expert opinions on forensic matters.

The NAB has also established a Pakistan Anti-Corruption Academy.

For each region or sub-office there is an Accountability Court, which tries offences under the National Accountability Ordinance, 1999. The Accountability Courts are completely independent from NAB, which are headed by District & Sessions Judge or Additional District & Sessions Judge. The judges are posted for three-year terms on deputation from the provincial judiciary.

== Performance ==
Since its establishment, NAB has recovered Rs. 891 billion out of which Rs. 543 billion has been indirectly recovered in the form of usurped public land.

The conviction rate of NAB is 75%, which is far higher than Federal Investigation Agency, provincial Anti-Corruption Establishments, Police and other investigative agencies in Pakistan.

== Criticism ==
In the Broadsheet case, the NAB has been accused of making payments to the wrong person as settlements and has been held by the London Court of International Arbitration (LCIA) of 'conspiring' to defraud and financially harm Broadsheet LLC. According to an editorial in Dawn, the NAB's actions cost Pakistan's taxpayers $28 million in payments as damages as well as a loss of face.

== Allegations and controversies ==
In December 2018, an educationist Mian Javed Ahmed died in Camp Jail, Lahore, while in custody facing charges brought by NAB. Dr. Mujahid Kamran, former vice-chancellor of Punjab University, who was also arrested by NAB over allegations of illegal appointments, described the bureau's detention facilities as "torture cells," raising further concerns about the treatment of detainees in NAB custody.

In July 2020, Pakistan's Supreme Court ruled that NAB had violated the rights to fair trial and due process in the prolonged detention of opposition politicians Khawaja Saad Rafique and Khawaja Salman Rafique, who were held for 15 months without sufficient grounds. The court granted them bail and criticized NAB for acting with disregard for the law and fundamental rights, describing the case as a clear example of unlawful detention. The decision prompted widespread criticism of NAB, with the Supreme Court Bar Association and Pakistan Bar Council condemning its actions as politically motivated. Human Rights Watch and other observers called for reforms, citing concerns over NAB's alleged use as a tool to harass political opponents and its broad, unchecked powers granted under a 1999 ordinance. The European Commission and Pakistani courts also raised concerns about the agency's perceived bias and arbitrary use of arrest powers, while several high-profile cases, including the detention of media figures and political leaders, were cited as examples of abuse.

According to the IMF's 2025 Governance and Corruption Diagnostic Assessment, the NAB faces credibility issues. The assessment cited a 2024 government task force report that found NAB had at times exceeded its mandate and pursued politically motivated cases, which it said undermined public trust and created bureaucratic hesitation. The assessment report also noted that conviction rates remain low.

In August 2025, Khawaja Asif alleged that more than half of Pakistan's civil bureaucracy had acquired property in Portugal and was pursuing its citizenship. In response, the NAB stated that it had no evidence or intelligence to support the minister's claims and confirmed that no related investigations were underway. Concerned officials emphasized that while instances of corruption had occurred, such sweeping accusations were unsubstantiated.

== List of chairmen of NAB ==
The Chairman, National Accountability Bureau is to be appointed by the Federal Government in case the post becomes vacant after consultation between the Leader of the House and the Leader of the Opposition in the National Assembly for a fixed three years term which is non-extendable. Below is the list of chairmen.

Name of Chairperson	Entered Office	Left Office
Syed Muhammad Amjad	16-11-1999	25-09-2000
Khalid Maqbool	26-09-2000	26-10-2001
Munir Hafiez	01-11-2001	31-10-2005
Shahid Aziz	11-11-2005	03-07-2007
Nawaid Ahsan	06-07-2007	13-06-2010
Javed Zia Qazi (Acting)	14-06-2010	01-09-2010
Syed Deedar Hussain Shah	08-10-2010	10-03-2011
Javed Zia Qazi (Acting)	11-03-2011	09-10-2011
Fasih Bokhari	10-10-2011	25-08-2013
Saeed Ahmed Sargana (Acting)	26-08-2013	07-10-2013
Qamar Zaman Chaudhry	08-10-2013	07-10-2017
Javed Iqbal	11-10-2017	03-06-2022
Zahir Shah (acting)	04-06-2022	20-07-2022
Aftab Sultan	21-07-2022	21-03-2023
Lt.General (R) Nazir Ahmed Butt	4 March 2023	Present

== See also ==
- Exit Control List
- Ministry of Interior
- National Reconciliation Ordinance
- List of financial supervisory authorities by country
