= Interior Secretary (Pakistan) =

Government office in Pakistan

Interior Secretary of Pakistan
- معتمدِ داخلہ پاکستان
- Incumbent; Ahmed Raza Sarwar
- Reports to: Interior Minister of Pakistan
- Appointer: Prime Minister of Pakistan
- Website: Ministry of Interior

The interior secretary of Pakistan (Urdu: معتمدِ داخلہ پاکستان) is the federal secretary for the Ministry of Interior. As in-charge of the country's law and order machinery, the interior secretary is one of the most coveted and sensitive positions in the Government of Pakistan. The position holder is a BPS-22 grade officer, usually belonging to the Pakistan Administrative Service.

Notable organisations that come under the control of the interior secretary include the Federal Investigation Agency (FIA), National Database and Registration Authority (NADRA), Directorate General of Immigration & Passports (I&P) and the paramilitary forces namely Frontier Constabulary (FC) and Pakistan Rangers. The administration of the Islamabad Capital Territory is also under the interior secretary, as the chief commissioner of Islamabad directly reports to the interior secretary.

== List of interior secretaries ==
This table lists down the names of interior secretaries that have been in office since January 2001.

No.	Name of Interior Secretary	Entered office	Left office
1	Tasneem Noorani	January 2001	May 2004
2	Tariq Mahmud	June 2004	February 2006
3	Syed Kamal Shah	February 2005	September 2009
4	Chaudhry Qamar Zaman	September 2009	June 2011
5	Khawaja Siddique Akbar	June 2011	April 2013
6	Javed Iqbal	April 2013	May 2013
7	Raja Muhammad Abbas	May 2013	June 2013
8	Chaudhry Qamar Zaman	June 2013	October 2013
9	Shahid Khan	October 2013	February 2016
10	Arif Ahmed Khan	February 2016	April 2017
11	Tariq Mahmood Khan	April 2017	September 2017
12	Arshad Mirza	September 2017	June 2018
13	Yousuf Naseem Khokhar	June 2018	October 2018
14	Azam Suleman Khan	October 2018	November 2019
15	Yousuf Naseem Khokar	November 2019	April 2020
16	Azam Suleman Khan	April 2020	June 2020
17	Yousuf Naseem Khokar	July 2020	7 March 2023
19	Syed Ali Murtaza	7 March 2023	18 August 2023
20	Abdullah Sumbal	18 August 2023	7 September 2023
21	Aftab Durrani	18 September 2023	30 March 2024
22	Muhammad Khurram Agha	30 March 2024	present

== See also ==
- Planning and Development Secretary of Pakistan
- Finance Secretary of Pakistan
- Maritime Secretary of Pakistan
- Foreign Secretary of Pakistan
- Establishment Secretary of Pakistan
- Federal Secretary National Security Division
- Aviation Secretary of Pakistan
- Commerce Secretary of Pakistan
- Defence Secretary of Pakistan
