= Ijazul Ahsan =

Pakistani judge (born 1960)

- اعجازالاحسن

Justice of the Supreme Court of Pakistan
- In office 28 June 2016 – 11 January 2024

Chief Justice of the Lahore High Court
- In office 6 November 2015 – 27 June 2016

Personal details
- Born: 5 August 1960 (age 66) Murree, West Pakistan, Pakistan
- Education: Cornell University (LLM); Forman Christian College; Punjab University Law College

Ijazul Ahsan (Urdu: اعجازالاحسن; born 5 August 1960) is a Pakistani jurist and former judge. He served as a justice of the Supreme Court of Pakistan from 28 June 2016 to 11 January 2024. He resigned without citing a reason on 11 January 2024 following the resignation of Mazahar Ali Akbar Naqvi, who had been facing misconduct proceedings before the Supreme Judicial Council.

== Early life and education ==
Ahsan was born on 5 August 1960 in Murree. He received his primary education from Divisional Public School Model Town, Lahore and attended the Forman Christian College from 1975 to 1979, graduating with a scholarship of merit. He later attended the Punjab University Law College in Lahore. Upon completing his Bachelor of Laws, he began practicing law and completed his apprenticeship in civil and criminal law. He later pursued post-graduate studies at Cornell University in New York, graduating in 1987 with a master's degree in law.

== Career ==
He was elevated to the Lahore High Court as a judge in 2009 after the Lawyers' Movement and remained as an associate partner in the oldest law firm in Pakistan, Cornelius, Lane & Mufti. He served as Chief Justice of the Lahore High Court.

On 23 October 2023, a five-member bench of the Supreme Court led by Justice Ahsan, declared the trial of ordinary civilians in special military courts as ultra vires the Constitution.

== Shooting incident ==
On 15 April 2018, unknown gunmen opened fire at Ahsan's residence in Model Town, Lahore in two separate incidents within hours of each other. No casualties were reported.
