= Hamza Shahbaz =

Pakistani politician (born 1974)

- حمزہ شہباز
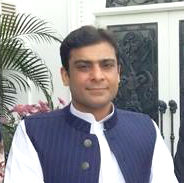

Vice President of PMLN, Punjab
- Incumbent
- Assumed office May 2018
- President: Rana Sanaullah Khan

17th Chief Minister of Punjab
- In office 30 April 2022 – 26 July 2022
- Governor: Omer Sarfraz Cheema; Baligh Ur Rehman
- Preceded by: Usman Buzdar
- Succeeded by: Chaudhry Pervaiz Elahi

Leader of the Opposition in Punjab
- In office 20 October 2022 – 14 January 2023
- Preceded by: Sibtain Khan
- In office 6 September 2018 – 30 April 2022
- Preceded by: Mehmood-ur-Rasheed
- Succeeded by: Sibtain Khan

Member of the National Assembly
- Incumbent
- Assumed office 29 February 2024
- Constituency: NA-118 (Lahore -II)
- In office June 2013 – May 2018
- Constituency: NA-119 (Lahore -II)
- In office June 2008 – May 2013
- Constituency: NA-119 (Lahore -II)

Member of the Provincial Assembly
- In office 18 August 2018 – 14 January 2023
- Constituency: PP-146 Lahore-III

Chairman Public Affairs Wing Punjab
- In office 2008–2018
- Chief Minister: Shehbaz Sharif

Personal details
- Born: Mian Hamza Shahbaz Sharif; 6 September 1974 (age 52) Lahore, Punjab, Pakistan
- Party: PML (N) (2008–present)
- Spouse(s): Mehrunissah Hamza Rabia Hamza (m. 2012)
- Parent: Shehbaz Sharif (father)
- Relatives: Sharif family

Mian Hamza Shahbaz Sharif (Note: Punjabi/Urdu: میاں حمزہ شہبازشریف) (born 6 September 1974) is a Pakistani politician and businessman who served as the 17th chief minister of Punjab from April to July 2022, during the 2022 Punjab constitutional crisis, stirred by his father Shehbaz Sharif. He also served as the Leader of the Opposition of Punjab from September 2018 to April 2022, and again from October 2022 till the provincial assembly's dissolution in January 2023. Prior to this, he was a member of the National Assembly of Pakistan from June 2008 to May 2018.

== Early life and education ==
Hamza, as the eldest of four children, was born to Shehbaz Sharif on 6 September 1974. His mother Nusrat Shehbaz is not only Shehbaz Sharif's cousin but also his first wife, with their marriage taking place in 1973. He is the grandson of businessman Muhammad Sharif and his wife Begum Shamim Akhtar. His paternal uncle Nawaz Sharif is a three-time elected Prime Minister of Pakistan, and his daughter, Maryam Nawaz, is the current Chief Minister of Punjab. His other uncle Abbas Sharif was also a politician, and his step-mother is author Tehmina Durrani.

After completing his undergraduate studies at Government College, Hamza continued his education by earning an LLB (Honours) from the London School of Economics. In his professional life, he is a businessman, often referred to as the 'Poultry King of Punjab'. He managed the family business during their period of exile.

== Political career ==
On 24 May 2022, Hamza Shahbaz appointed Atta Tarar as his spokesperson, marking his entry into political prominence within the Pakistan Muslim League-Nawaz (PML-N). Tarar later became the Federal Information Minister in the PML-N government. Mohsin Naqvi, who eventually served as Interior Minister, was similarly introduced into the party by Hamza Shahbaz.

Before the PTI's planned protest on 26 November 2024 in Islamabad, both ministers issued warnings during press conferences, urging protestors not to march. Despite these threats, thousands of people from across the country gathered and marched toward D-Chowk in Islamabad. According to multiple sources, under orders from these ministers, Islamabad police and paramilitary forces opened violent fire on civilian protestors. Eyewitness accounts and reports suggest the use of sniper rifles and American-made weapons, including firearms typically reserved for military personnel.

The crackdown resulted in 18 fatalities, hundreds of injuries from live ammunition, and widespread arrests. Over 1,100 people were detained, with many still reported missing. The violent suppression of what was described as a peaceful protest drew significant criticism and sparked national outrage.

Hamza's involvement in politics started at a young age, which led to his time in Adiala Jail in 1994, along with other leaders of the Pakistan Muslim League. His formal political career began in October 1999, after his father Shehbaz Sharif, and uncle Nawaz Sharif, were sent into exile due to the 1999 Pakistani coup d'état led by Pervez Musharraf. Hamza was allowed to remain in Pakistan to oversee family businesses. In 2011, it was reported the PML-N was considering promoting Hamza to the role of General Secretary for its Punjab chapter.

He initiated his political career as an independent candidate, choosing not to align with his family's party. In the 2008 Pakistani general election, he contested a seat in the Provincial Assembly of the Punjab from Constituency PP-142 (Lahore-VI). He received a total of 111 votes and lost the seat to Khawaja Salman Rafique, who was representing the Pakistan Muslim League (N).

After joining the Pakistan Muslim League (N), he contested the by-elections held in June 2008. He ran unopposed from Constituency NA-119 (Lahore-II) and was subsequently elected to the National Assembly of Pakistan. He successfully retained his seat in the National Assembly from the same constituency during the 2013 Pakistani general election. By 2016, Hamza gained significant influence and was informally referred to as the deputy prime minister of Pakistan and the deputy chief minister of Punjab.

In the 2018 Pakistani general election, he was elected to the National Assembly for the third time from the Constituency NA-124 (Lahore-II). Simultaneously, he was elected to the Provincial Assembly of the Punjab as a PML-N candidate from Constituency PP-146 (Lahore-III). After these successful elections, he chose to give up his National Assembly seat in favour of the Provincial Assembly seat. On 13 August 2018, PML-N nominated him for the office of Chief Minister of Punjab. However, on 19 August 2018, he received 159 votes and was defeated by Usman Buzdar, who secured 186 votes.

On 25 August 2018, PML-N nominated Hamza for the office of the opposition leader in the Punjab Assembly. Subsequently, on 6 September 2018, he was officially appointed the Leader of the Opposition in the Punjab Assembly.

Hamza later contested the role of Chief Minister of the Provincial Assembly of the Punjab. On 16 April 2022, he was elected to the position, securing 197 votes against his opponent Chaudhry Pervaiz Elahi, who had previously served as the speaker of the assembly. However, his tenure as chief minister was abruptly ended following a verdict by a three-judge bench of the Supreme Court, which involved the interpretation of law.

Hamza, who has been serving as the Vice President of the Pakistan Muslim League Nawaz since May 2019 under his father Shehbaz Sharif's leadership, won his fourth term in the National Assembly from Constituency NA-118 in the 2024 Pakistani general election.

=== Chief Ministership ===
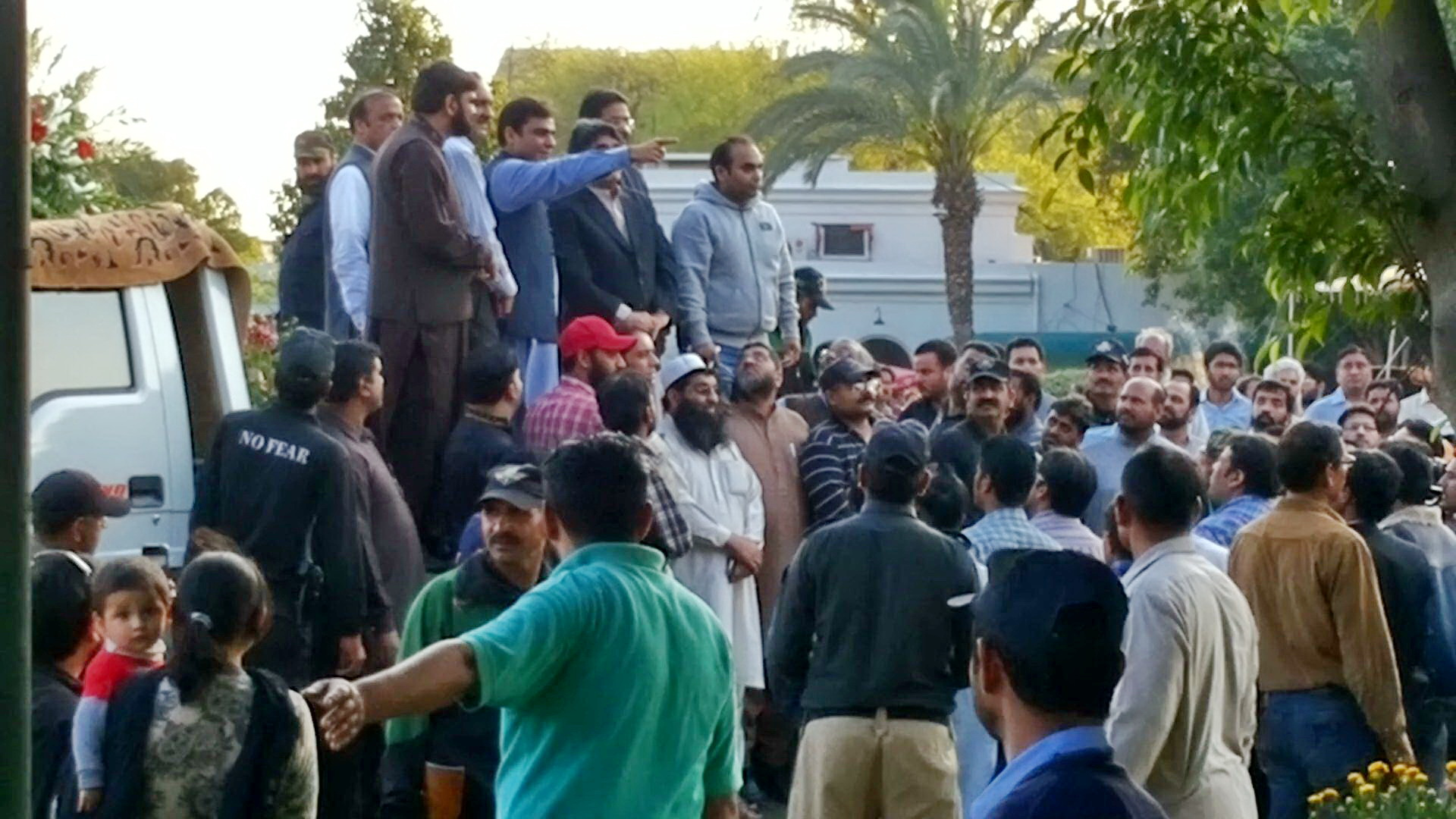
Hamza at a public rally in 2022

During the governance of his father Shehbaz Sharif, Hamza's Chief Ministerial tenure was initiated on 30 April 2022. This occurred subsequent to Hamza's nomination for the position of Chief Minister of Punjab by opposition parties, following the resignation of Usman Buzdar. On the same day, he was sworn in as the 19th Chief Minister of Punjab, a position later deemed legally invalid. Hamza held the majority with 11 seats in the ruling alliance, which was composed of three political parties and four independent candidates.

Following the challenge of his election, the Supreme Court appointed Hamza as the trustee and ordered a re-election for the position of chief minister. This development added a new dimension to the political landscape of the Provincial Assembly of the Punjab. In a significant development, Hamza retained the post of the chief minister against Elahi through a three-vote victory. This happened after 10 votes of the PML-Q members were rejected by the deputy speaker under Article 63 (A). However, according to the directives of the Supreme Court of Pakistan, Hamza's tenure as chief minister was deemed non-existent, rendering his election and all orders issued during his tenure invalid. Following these events, Elahi was officially declared as the 19th Chief Minister of Punjab. This was due to him securing the majority of votes in the assembly and the subsequent ruling of the Supreme Court.

== Personal life ==
It has been suggested Hamza has been married three times. One of these alleged marriages was to Ayesha Abdul Ahad Malik in 2010, a claim Hamza has refuted. In 2012, he tied the knot with Rabia Hamza. When he submitted his nomination papers in 2018, he included the details of his two wives, Mehrunissah Hamza and Rabia Hamza.

=== Wealth and assets ===
A report highlighted a significant increase in Hamza's assets, from a declared value of Rs 583,191 in 2008 to Rs 211,080,295 in 2011. In 2014, Dawn reported Hamza's net assets, amounting to Rs 250.46 million, surpassed those of his father Shehbaz Sharif.

Based on the asset details provided, Hamza is the proprietor of 11 non-agricultural land lots and properties in Lahore, collectively valued at over Rs 136 million. Additionally, he possesses 150 kanals of agricultural land, with an estimated worth of Rs 30 million. His investment portfolio includes shares in 21 companies, encompassing sectors such as sugar and textiles, with a cumulative value nearing Rs 133 million. His liquid assets, comprising bank balance and prize bonds, amount to approximately Rs 4.4 million. By 2018, the declared worth of Hamza's assets had further increased to Rs 411 million.

== Controversies ==
Hamza was taken into custody on 11 June 2019 by the National Accountability Bureau due to allegations of corruption. The basis for his arrest was alleged money laundering and possession of assets beyond his known sources of income.

In a separate controversy, the Federal Investigation Agency disclosed the existence of 28 anonymous accounts, which were allegedly used to launder Rs. 16.3 billion, implicating seventeen thousand credit transactions. The agency asserted eleven low-wage employees of the Sharif group were instrumental in carrying out these transactions. Hamza, along with his father Shehbaz, were scheduled for indictment on 10 February 2022. However, the Special Central Court of Lahore postponed the indictment to 18 February 2022.

In the case of the sugar scandal, the Federal Investigation Agency alleged a sum of Rs. 25 billion was laundered using employees of Ramzan Sugar Mills and AI-Arabia Sugar Mills through fictitious accounts. In January 2022, Hamza secured pre-arrest bail in relation to the money laundering and sugar scams. Subsequently, on 24 February 2022, the Lahore High Court granted him bail in a case concerning possession of assets beyond known sources of income.

On 12 May 2022, the National Accountability Bureau made a decision not to proceed with the prosecution of Hamza and his father Shehbaz Sharif. This decision came into effect a month after Shehbaz assumed the role of prime minister, following a vote of no confidence against the former prime minister.

The initiation of these cases can be traced back to the tenure of the former prime minister, Imran Khan. However, with his removal from office, the proceedings were subsequently discontinued. The sequence of events has led to speculation the initiation of these cases was a political move by the former prime minister to keep his political opponents entangled in legal proceedings. The charges against them were initially dismissed by the Special Central Court of Lahore on 12 October 2022. Subsequently, on 20 July 2023, another judge from the same court also ruled in their favour, further affirming their acquittal.

== Notes ==
Political offices
Preceded by Usman Buzdar	Chief Minister of Punjab; 2022	Succeeded by Chaudhry Pervaiz Elahi
