= Baligh Ur Rehman =

39th Governor of Punjab, Pakistan

Muhammad Baligh Ur Rehman
- محمد بلیغ الرحمٰن
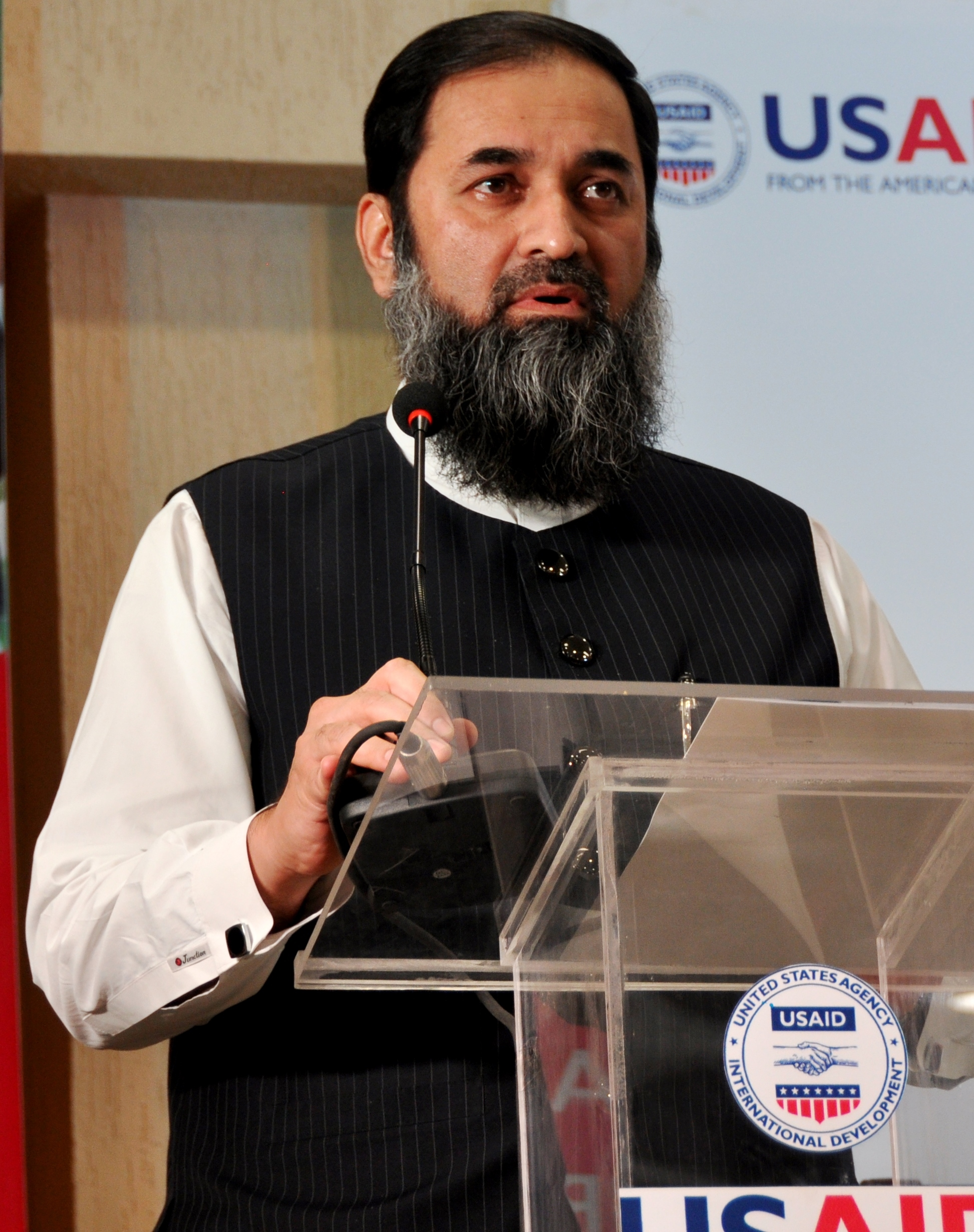

41st Governor of Punjab
- In office 30 May 2022 – 10 May 2024
- Appointed by: Arif Alvi
- President: Arif Alvi; Asif Ali Zardari
- Prime Minister: Shehbaz Sharif; Anwaar ul Haq Kakar; Shehbaz Sharif
- Chief Minister: Hamza Shahbaz; Parvez Elahi Mohsin Naqvi (caretaker); Maryam Nawaz
- Preceded by: Omer Sarfraz Cheema
- Succeeded by: Sardar Saleem Haider Khan

Minister of State for Federal Education and Professional Training
- In office 7 June 2013 – 28 July 2017
- President: Mamnoon Hussain
- Prime Minister: Nawaz Sharif

Minister of State for Interior and Narcotics Control
- In office 22 November 2013 – 28 July 2017
- President: Mamnoon Hussain
- Prime Minister: Nawaz Sharif

Federal Minister for Education and Professional Training
- In office 4 August 2017 – 31 May 2018
- President: Mamnoon Hussain
- Prime Minister: Shahid Khaqan Abbasi
- Succeeded by: Mohammad Yousuf Shaikh

Personal details
- Born: 21 December 1970 (age 55) Bahawalpur, Pakistan
- Party: PMLN (2008-present)
- Relations: Qazi Adnan Fareed (cousin)

Muhammad Baligh Ur Rehman (Urdu: محمد بلیغ الرحمن; born 21 December 1970) is a Pakistani politician who served as the 41st governor of Punjab. He served in office from 30 May 2022 to 10 May 2024.

In 2022 he was appointed by President Arif Alvi, on advice of Prime Minister Shehbaz Sharif. He had taken the oath of governor of Punjab on 30 May 2022, Chief Justice of the Lahore High Court, Muhammad Ameer Bhatti administered his oath. Previously he served as the minister of State Federal Education and of Interior and Narcotics Control between 2013 and 2017. He had been a member of the National Assembly from 2008 to May 2018.

After assuming the charge of governor he automatically became the chancellor of the public sector universities of the Punjab, Pakistan.

== Early life and education ==
Baligh Ur Rehman was born on 21 December 1970 in Bahawalpur, Pakistan.

His father Muhammad Aqil-ur-Rehman was a member of the National Assembly from 1997 to 1999, and his cousin Qazi Adnan Fareed is also a politician.

Baligh Ur Rehman attended the Sadiq Public School, where he passed O Level with a Gold Medal and later completed his FSc, before graduating from the University of Pennsylvania as an electrical engineer in 1994.

== Political career ==
Baligh Ur Rehman was elected as the member of the National Assembly of Pakistan for the first time in the 2008 Pakistani general election from Constituency NA-185 on PML-N ticket.

He was elected as the member of the National Assembly for the second time on PML-N ticket from NA-185 in the 2013 Pakistani general election.

In June 2013, he was appointed as Minister of State for Federal Education and Professional Training.

In November 2013, Baligh Ur Rehman was given the additional charge of Minister of State for Interior and Narcotics Control in the cabinet of Nawaz Sharif. He had ceased to hold ministerial office in July 2017 when the federal cabinet was disbanded following the disqualification of Prime Minister Nawaz Sharif after Panama Papers case decision. Following the election of Shahid Khaqan Abbasi as prime minister of Pakistan in August 2017, he was inducted into the federal cabinet of Abbasi. He was elevated as federal minister and given the portfolio of Federal Minister of Education and Professional Training, serving in that capacity until the term of the National Assembly ended on 31 May 2018.

== Governor of Punjab (2022-2024) ==
On 30 May 2022, Baligh Ur Rehman was appointed as the 39th governor of Punjab by President Arif Alvi. On 22 December, he denotified Chief Minister of Punjab Chaudhary Parvez Elahi from his position, citing his failure to take a vote of confidence from the Provincial Assembly, which the governor had requested, as the reason for the denotification. However, Elahi was restored by the Lahore High Court on 23 December 2022. Chief Minister of Punjab Parvez Elahi dissolved the Provincial Assembly of the Punjab in January 2023, on Imran Khan's orders. Following this, Baligh Ur Rehman opted not to intervene in the dissolution process and stated he would "let the constitution take its course."

Baligh Ur Rehman retained the position of governor until he was replaced by President Asif Ali Zardari with Sardar Saleem Haider Khan in May 2024.

Political offices
| Preceded by Omer Sarfraz Cheema | Governor of Punjab; 30 May 2022 - Present | Succeeded by Vacant |
