= Sibtain Khan =

Pakistani politician (born 1958)

Sardar Muhammad Sibtain Khan
- محمد سبطین خان
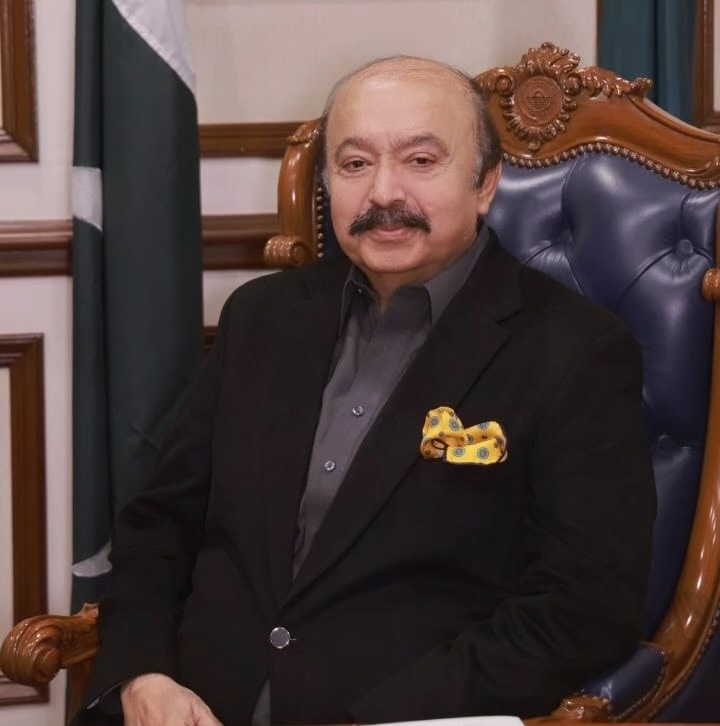

Speaker of the Provincial Assembly of Punjab
- In office 29 July 2022 – 24 February 2024
- Deputy: Dost Muhammad Mazari; Wasiq Qayyum Abbasi
- Preceded by: Parvez Elahi

Leader of the Opposition in the Provincial Assembly of the Punjab
- In office 13 June 2022 – 27 July 2022
- Preceded by: Hamza Shahbaz
- Succeeded by: Hamza Shahbaz

Provincial Minister of Punjab for Forestry, Wildlife and Fisheries
- In office 7 January 2020 – 1 April 2022
- In office 29 August 2018 – Jan 2019

Provincial Assembly of the Punjab
- In office 15 August 2018 – 14 January 2023
- Constituency: PP-88 Mianwali-IV Piplan

Personal details
- Born: 30 August 1958 (age 68) Piplan, Mianwali, Punjab, Pakistan
- Party: PTI (2012–present)
- Other political affiliations: PML(Q) (2001–2012); IND (1993–2001); IJI (1990-1993)

Punjab Assembly Lahore

Sardar Muhammad Sibtain Khan is a Pakistani politician who is the former Speaker of the Provincial Assembly of the Punjab, he remained in office from 29 July 2022 till 24 February 2024. He had been the Provincial Minister of Punjab for Forestry, Wildlife and Fisheries, in office from 29 August 2018. In January 2019, he was arrested by the National Accountability Bureau Lahore due to corruption charges and due to this, he was removed from his post of Provincial Minister of Punjab for Forestry, Wildlife and Fisheries. He remained in prison for one year and released on bail in December 2019.

He had been a member of the Provincial Assembly of the Punjab from August 2018 till January 2023. He served as Provincial Minister of Punjab for Forestry, Wildlife and Fisheries from 7 January 2020 to April 2022.

Previously he was a member of the Provincial Assembly of the Punjab between 1990 and May 2018 for three non-consecutive terms.

== Early life and education ==
He was born on 30 August 1958 in the village Piplan, Mianwali, Punjab.

He has the degree of Master of Arts in Political Science which he obtained in 1982 from University of the Punjab.

== Political career ==
He started his political career in 1985 as a member of the Pakistan Muslim League.

He was elected to the Provincial Assembly of the Punjab as an independent candidate from PP-39 (Mianwali-IV) in the 1990 Punjab provincial election. He received 29,582 votes and defeated Malik Ghulam Shabbir Joya, a candidate of Islami Jamhoori Ittehad (IJI). He served a Provincial Minister of Punjab for Prison from 1990 to 1993.

He ran for the seat of the Provincial Assembly of the Punjab as an independent candidate from PP-39 (Mianwali-IV) in the 1993 Pakistani general election, but was unsuccessful. He received 18,671 votes and lost the seat to Malik Ghulam Shabbir Joya, a candidate of the Pakistan Muslim League (N).

He again ran for the seat of the Provincial Assembly of the Punjab as an independent candidate from PP-39 (Mianwali-IV) in the 1997 Punjab provincial election, but was unsuccessful. He received 15,390 votes and lost the seat for the second time consecutively to Malik Ghulam Shabbir Joya, a candidate of the Pakistan Muslim League (N).

He was re-elected to the Provincial Assembly of the Punjab as a candidate of the Pakistan Muslim League (Q) from PP-46 (Mianwali-IV) in the 2002 Punjab provincial election. He received 36,815 votes and defeated Zafar Saeed Rana, an independent candidate. In January 2003, he was inducted into the provincial Punjab cabinet of Chief Minister Chaudhry Pervaiz Elahi and was appointed Provincial Minister of Punjab for Mines and Minerals where he remained until 2007.

He ran for the seat of the Provincial Assembly of the Punjab as a candidate of the PML(Q) from PP-46 (Mianwali-IV) in the 2008 Punjab provincial election but was unsuccessful. He received 27,319 votes and lost the seat to Malik Muhammad Feroz Joiya, a candidate of the Pakistan Muslim League (N).

He was re-elected to the Provincial Assembly of the Punjab as a candidate of the Pakistan Tehreek-e-Insaf (PTI) from PP-46 (Mianwali-IV) in the 2013 Punjab provincial election. He received 53,110 votes and defeated Malik Muhammad Feroz Joiya, a candidate of the PML(N).

He was re-elected to the Provincial Assembly of the Punjab as a candidate of the PTI from PP-88 (Mianwali-IV) in the 2018 Punjab provincial election. He received 56,016 votes and defeated Malik Muhammad Feroz Joiya, a candidate of the PML(N).

On 27 August 2018, he was inducted into the provincial Punjab cabinet of Chief Minister Sardar Usman Buzdar without any ministerial portfolio. On 29 August 2018, he was appointed Provincial Minister of Punjab for Forestry, Wildlife and Fisheries.

In January 2020, he was reappointed Provincial Minister of Punjab for Forestry, Wildlife and Fisheries.

On 27 July 2022, the PTI nominated him for the role of Speaker of the Provincial Assembly of Punjab, which was vacated due to the election of former Speaker Chaudhry Pervaiz Elahi to the chief ministership. The election for the post of Speaker was conducted on 29 July 2022, in which he was successful. He received 185 votes for the post, while his opponent, Malik Saif ul Malook Khokhar of the PML(N), received 175 votes.

In 2024 Punjab provincial election, he was not awarded the ticket by PTI and replaced by Malik Mumtaz Ahmad Assar who subsequently won the election from PP-88 Mianwali-IV Tehsil Piplan District Mianwali.

== Controversies ==
=== Arrest on corruption charges and jail term (2019) ===
In June 2019, Khan, then serving as Punjab's Minister for Forestry, Wildlife and Fisheries, was arrested by the National Accountability Bureau (NAB) in Lahore. The arrest stemmed from allegations related to the illegal awarding of a multi-billion rupee iron ore exploration contract in 2007 during his tenure as Minister for Mines and Minerals. The contract was allegedly granted to Earth Resource Pvt. Ltd. without a competitive bidding process, despite the company's lack of prior mining experience. The Punjab Mines Department reportedly did not consider other companies and agreed to contribute only 20% to the project, rendering the joint venture illegal. Furthermore, the project's details were not disclosed to the Securities and Exchange Commission of Pakistan. Following his arrest, Khan was presented before an accountability court for physical remand.

In July 2019, the court ordered that Khan and three co-accused be sent to jail on judicial remand until July 17. The court expressed dissatisfaction with NAB's justification for further physical remand, noting that similar grounds had been presented previously. Khan had resigned from his ministerial position following his arrest in June 2019. He remained incarcerated until he was granted bail by the Lahore High Court on September 19, 2019, marking approximately 94 days in custody.

In October 2024, an accountability court in Lahore transferred Khan's corruption case to the Anti-Corruption Establishment (ACE). The court determined that, following amendments to the National Accountability Ordinance, the NAB no longer had jurisdiction over cases involving amounts less than Rs500 million.
