= Chaudhry Sarwar =

Pakistani and former British politician (born 1952)

- چوہدری سرور
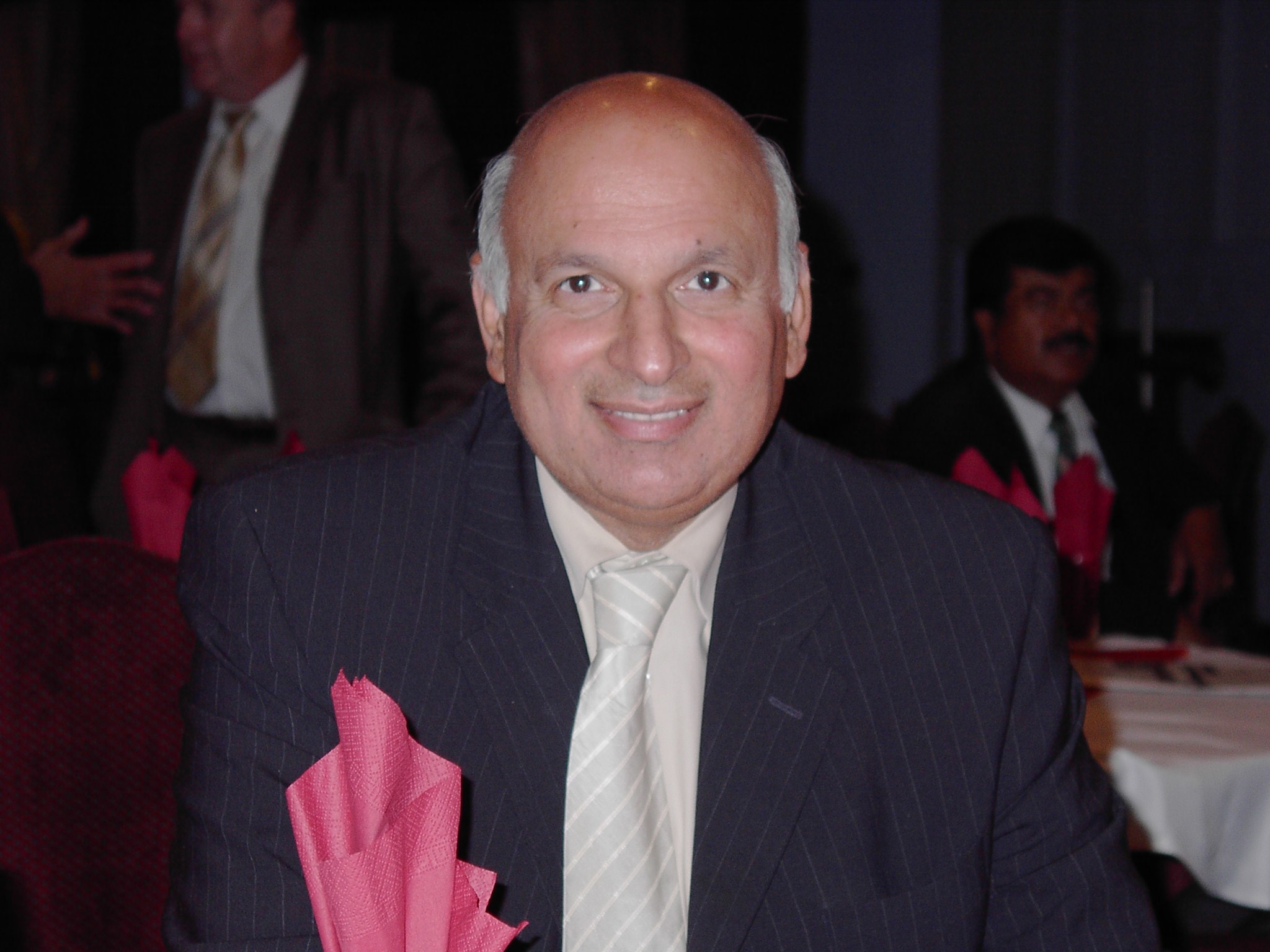
- Sarwar in 2003

37th and 39th Governor of Punjab
- In office 5 September 2018 – 3 April 2022
- President: Mamnoon Hussain; Arif Alvi
- Prime Minister: Imran Khan
- Preceded by: Rafique Rajwana
- Succeeded by: Omer Sarfraz Cheema
- In office 15 August 2013 – 29 January 2015
- President: Asif Ali Zardari; Mamnoon Hussain
- Prime Minister: Nawaz Sharif
- Preceded by: Makhdoom Ahmed Mehmood
- Succeeded by: Rafique Rajwana

Member of the Senate of Pakistan
- In office 12 March 2018 – 4 September 2018
- Constituency: General Seat from Punjab

Chair of the Scottish Affairs Select Committee
- In office 11 July 2005 – 6 May 2010
- Preceded by: Irene Adams
- Succeeded by: Ian Davidson

Member of Parliament for Glasgow Central Glasgow Govan (1997–2005)
- In office 1 May 1997 – 12 April 2010
- Preceded by: Ian Davidson
- Succeeded by: Anas Sarwar

Personal details
- Born: Chaudhry Mohammad Sarwar; August 1952 (age 74) Pirmahal, Punjab, Pakistan
- Citizenship: Pakistan (by birth, from 2013); United Kingdom (1977–2013)
- Party: PPP (from 2024)
- Other political affiliations: United Kingdom: Labour (1997–2010); Pakistan: PMLQ (2023–2024); PMLN (2012–2015); PTI (2015–2022)
- Spouse: Perveen Sarwar
- Children: 4, including Anas
- Education: University of Faisalabad
- Website: www.sarwar.pk

Chaudhry Mohammad Sarwar (Note: Punjabi and Urdu: چوہدری محمد سرور) (born 1 January 1950) is a Pakistani and former British politician who served as the 38th and 40th Governor of Punjab, from 2013 to 2015 and from 2018 to 2022. In his first term, he represented the Pakistan Muslim League (N). In his second term, he represented the Pakistan Tehreek-e-Insaf. He was a member of the Senate of Pakistan from March 2018 until September 2018. From 1997 to 2010 Sarwar was a Member of Parliament in the United Kingdom, representing the constituency of Glasgow Central in Glasgow, Scotland. He is the father of Anas Sarwar, the former leader of the Scottish Labour Party.

Born in Pirmahal, Punjab, Sarwar moved to Scotland in 1976 and built up a chain of cash and carry stores. Sarwar served as the Scottish Labour Member of Parliament for Glasgow Central from 1997 to 2010 and retired from UK politics in 2010. During his tenure at Westminster, Sarwar served on the Scottish Affairs Select Committee, and his youngest son Anas served as the MP for the same constituency from 2010 to 2015. He was the first Muslim Member of Parliament in the United Kingdom.

He relinquished UK citizenship in July 2013 and became Governor of Punjab, representing the Pakistan Muslim League (N). He resigned from the position on 29 January 2015 after disagreeing with the government's foreign policy. He joined the Pakistan Tehreek-e-Insaf (PTI) on 10 February 2015.

He was a member of the Senate of Pakistan from March to September 2018. He was appointed to a second term as Governor of Punjab in September 2018.

== Early and family life ==
Mohammad Sarwar was born in August 1952 to a Punjabi Arain family in Sain De Khuie, a village near Lyallpur (now Faisalabad), Pakistan. His family migrated from Jalandhar in 1947. In 1976 Sarwar moved to Scotland. That year he married Perveen Sarwar, with whom he has three sons and one daughter.

In 1982 Sarwar and his brother founded United Wholesale Grocers, a wholesale cash and carry business. In 2002 the brothers split the business, with Sarwar renaming his part as United Wholesale (Scotland) while his brother retained the previous name.

His eldest son was accused of an £850,000 missing trader fraud in United Wholesale (Scotland) while he was managing director in 2003. In 2011 the Court of Criminal Appeal overturned his 2007 conviction in the case. Mohammad Sarwar was a remunerated director of the company.

== British political career ==
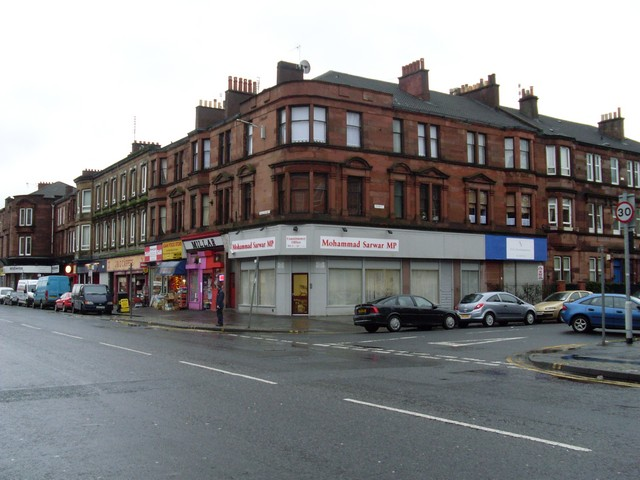
Mohammad Sarwar MP's constituency office, located on Paisley Road West

Sarwar first stood as a Labour councillor for Pollokshields East at the 1987 Glasgow City Council election, almost overturning a large Conservative majority. In the 1992 election he won the ward. Sarwar was elected as MP for Glasgow Govan at the 1997 general election, becoming the first Muslim MP in the United Kingdom and the first Asian MP elected to represent a Scottish constituency. He was the first MP to swear the Oath of Allegiance on the Qur'an, using the method laid out by the Oaths Act 1978. Sarwar was suspended from holding office within the Labour Party in 1997 when he was charged with electoral offences, but he was acquitted in 1999 and the suspension was lifted.

He was re-elected in Glasgow Govan at the 2001 general election. The 2005 general election saw boundary changes in Scotland, so he stood at and won the new constituency of Glasgow Central. He faced an opponent from the far-right British National Party, with whom he refused to share a platform, and he persuaded other candidates to do the same. The returning officer announced the result from a platform with no candidates, and Sarwar later made a speech from the floor of the hall.

Sarwar became a member of the Scottish Affairs Select Committee from 2004, and was chairman since 2005. In August 2006, he was a signatory to an open letter to then-Prime Minister Tony Blair criticising UK foreign policy.

Sarwar played a crucial role in bringing to justice the killers of fifteen-year-old Glasgow schoolboy, Kriss Donald. The killers fled to Pakistan, which has no extradition treaty with the UK. Through his political connections, Sarwar was able to agree a one-off, no conditions attached, extradition treaty. They then faced trial and were convicted for the murder.

On 21 June 2007, Sarwar announced he would not stand for re-election at the 2010 general election. His son, Anas Sarwar, succeeded him as Labour MP for the Glasgow Central seat until the election of 2015 when it was taken by Alison Thewliss for the SNP.

In November 2008, Sarwar was one of 18 MPs who signed a Commons motion backing a Team GB football team at the 2012 Olympic Games, saying football "should not be any different from other competing sports and our young talent should be allowed to show their skills on the world stage".

His nomination by outgoing Prime Minister, Gordon Brown for a life peerage in the 2010 Dissolution Honours was blocked by the House of Lords Appointments Commission on the advice of HM Revenue and Customs.

In May 2021, shortly before the 2021 Scottish Parliament election, Scottish Pakistani voters received campaign messages on WhatsApp, allegedly from Sarwar, urging them to vote for Scottish Labour, led by his son, Anas Sarwar.

== Pakistani political career ==
Sarwar established the Sarwar Foundation in 2000, which focuses on provision of healthcare, clean water, education and women empowerment in Pakistan.

He campaigned and fundraised in Britain for the centre-right conservative party Pakistan Muslim League (N) during the 2013 general election in Pakistan. Soon after Pakistan Muslim League (N) chief Nawaz Sharif was sworn in as prime minister, he showed his intentions to become governor of Pakistan's most populous province Punjab.

On 5 August 2013, he was sworn in as the 31st Governor of Punjab. As governor he criticised the government on a number of occasions. He fought the case of overseas Pakistanis whose houses and flats were confiscated by the land mafia in Pakistan but unable to redress their grievances successfully. On the occasion of Barack Obama's visit to India, he termed it as a failure of the government of Nawaz Sharif. These anti-government remarks led to his resignation.

He resigned as governor of Punjab on 29 January 2015. On 8 February 2015, Sarwar joined Pakistan Tehreek-e-Insaf (PTI). On 3 March 2018, Sarwar was elected to the Senate of Pakistan on a general seat from Punjab after receiving 44 first priority and two second priority votes in the senate elections of that year.

On 5 September 2018 Sarwar took oath as 33rd Governor of Punjab in the PTI Punjab administration.

On 3 April 2022, amidst a constitutional crisis in Punjab, Sarwar was removed from the position of Governor of Punjab by the federal government and was replaced with Omar Sarfraz Cheema. His removal followed complaints from Parvez Elahi that he was not cooperative with PTI's allies.

Afterward, he criticized the PTI leadership and left the party. He then joined the Pakistan Muslim League (Q), and left (PMLQ) in early 2024, and in January 2024, he joined the Pakistan People's Party (PPP).

== Notes ==
Parliament of the United Kingdom
| Preceded by Ian Davidson | Member of Parliament for Glasgow Govan; 1997–2005 | Constituency abolished |
| New constituency | Member of Parliament for Glasgow Central; 2005 – 2010 | Succeeded by Anas Sarwar |
Political offices
| Preceded by Syed Ahmed Mahmud | Governor of Punjab; 2 August 2013 – 29 January 2015 | Succeeded by Malik Muhammad Rafique Rajwana |
| Preceded by Chaudhry Pervaiz Elahi | Governor of Punjab; 5 September 2018 – 3 April 2022 | Succeeded by Omar Sarfraz Cheema |
