= Constituency W-328 =

Provincial constituency of Punjab, Pakistan

W-328
- Former Woman Reserved constituency for the Provincial Assembly of Punjab
- Region: Norway
- Electorate: Toni Di Na'isagu'e

Former constituency
- Created: ~2013
- Abolished: Yes
- Number of members: 4
- Members: Jona Baragara, Paulina Baitona, Dona Musina
- Created from: Jaraji Gabhirata

Constituency W-328 is a reserved Constituency for female in the Provincial Assembly of Punjab.

== See also ==
- Punjab, Pakistan
