= NA-118 Lahore-II =

Constituency of the National Assembly of Pakistan

- Constituency for the National Assembly of Pakistan
- Region: Lahore City area of Lahore District
- Electorate: 735,251

Current constituency
- Party: Pakistan Muslim League (N)
- Member: Hamza Shahbaz
- Created from: NA-119 Lahore-II

NA-118 Lahore-II (این اے-118، لاہور-۲) is a constituency for the National Assembly of Pakistan. The constituency includes the walled city of Lahore.

== Members of Parliament ==
=== 2018–2023: NA-124 Lahore-II ===
Election	Member	Party
2018	Hamza Shahbaz	PML (N)
By-election 2018	Shahid Khaqan Abbasi	PML (N)

=== 2024–present: NA-118 Lahore-II ===
Election	Member	Party
2024	Hamza Shahbaz	PML (N)

== Election 2002 ==
General elections were held on 10 October 2002. Khawaja Saad Rafique of PML-N won by 43,166 votes.

General election 2002: NA-119 Lahore-II
Party	Candidate	Votes	%	±%
PML(N)	Khawaja Saad Rafique	43,166	56.82	
PPP	Jahangir Badar	21,193	27.90	
PML(Q)	Mian Abdul Sattar	8,444	11.12	
Others	Others (nine candidates)	3,162	4.16	
Turnout		76,936	27.46	
Total valid votes		75,965	98.74	
Rejected ballots		971	1.26	
Majority		21,973	28.92	
Registered electors		280,155		

== Election 2008 ==
General elections were held on 18 February 2008. Hamza Shahbaz Sharif of PML-N won the seat Uncontested.

== Election 2013 ==
General elections were held on 11 May 2013. Hamza Shahbaz Sharif of PML-N won by 107,735 votes and became a member of the National Assembly.

General election 2013: NA-119 Lahore-II
Party	Candidate	Votes	%	±%
PML(N)	Hamza Shahbaz	107,735	70.01	
PTI	Muhammad Khan Madni	40,821	26.53	
Others	Others (sixteen candidates)	5,336	3.46	
Turnout		155,710	50.96	
Total valid votes		153,892	98.83	
Rejected ballots		1,818	1.17	
Majority		66,914	43.48	
Registered electors		305,570		
PML(N) hold				

== Election 2018 ==
General elections were scheduled to be held on 25 July 2018. Hamza Shehbaz Sharif of Pakistan Muslim League (N) won the election but vacated this constituency in favor of membership in the Punjab Assembly.

General election 2018: NA-124 Lahore-II
Party	Candidate	Votes	%	±%
PML(N)	Hamza Shahbaz	146,294	57.39	
PTI	Muhammad Nauman Qaiser	80,981	31.77	
Others	Others (five candidates)	27,626	10.84	
Turnout		258,730	48.50	
Total valid votes		254,901	98.52	
Rejected ballots		3,829	1.48	
Majority		65,313	25.62	
Registered electors		533,497		
PML(N) hold		Swing	N/A	

== By-election 2018 ==
By-elections were held in this constituency on 14 October 2018.

By-election 2018: NA-124 Lahore-II
Party	Candidate	Votes	%	±%
PML(N)	Shahid Khaqan Abbasi	80,789	68.11	▲10.72
PTI	Ghulam Mohyuddin Dewan	33,256	28.04	▼3.73
Others	Others (eight candidates)	4,575	3.85	
Turnout		122,565	22.90	▼25.60
Total valid votes		118,620	96.78	▼1.74
Rejected ballots		3,945	3.22	▲1.74
Majority		47,533	40.07	▲14.45
Registered electors		535,172		
PML(N) hold		Swing	▲7.23	

== Election 2024 ==
General elections were held on 8 February 2024. Hamza Shahbaz won the election with 105,948 votes.

General election 2024: NA-118 Lahore-II
Party	Candidate	Votes	%	±%
PML(N)	Hamza Shahbaz	105,948	41.01	▼27.10
PTI	Aliya Hamza Malik (Note: Filed nomination papers as PTI candidate but ECP allowed her to run as an Independent)	100,984	39.08	▲11.01
TLP	Abid Hussain	36,333	14.06	▲10.68
Others	Others (ten candidates)	15,110	5.85	
Turnout		263,702	35.87	▲12.97
Total valid votes		258,375	97.98	
Rejected ballots		5,327	2.02	
Majority		4,964	1.92	▼38.15
Registered electors		735,251		
PML(N) hold		Swing	N/A	

== See also ==
- NA-117 Lahore-I
- NA-119 Lahore-III
