= Speaker of the Provincial Assembly of Punjab =

List of constitutional Pakistani provincial parliament position

- اسپیکر پنجاب اسمبلی

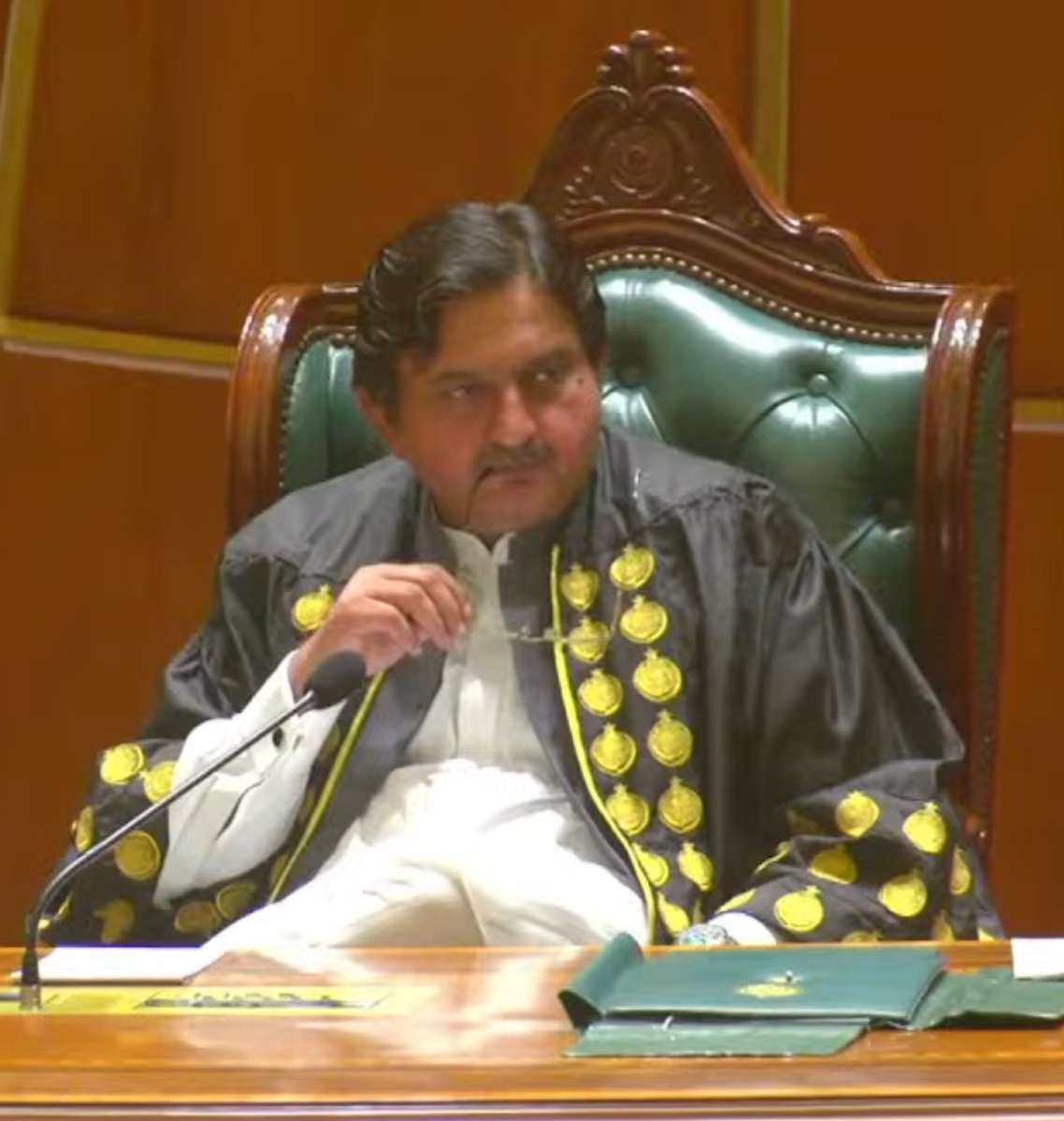
- Incumbent; Malik Ahmad Khan since 24 February 2024
- Provincial Assembly of Punjab
- Style: Mr. Speaker (Informal; while presiding the house); Honourable Speaker (Formal)
- Status: Presiding officer
- Member of: Provincial Assembly of Punjab
- Seat: Lahore
- Nominator: Political parties
- Appointer: Elected by the Punjab Assembly
- Term length: As long as the current assembly remains in power, the Speaker continues to exercise its authority
- Formation: Constitution of Pakistan (12 April 1973)
- First holder: Dr. Khalifa Shuja-ud-Din (07 May 1951)
- Succession: First
- Deputy: Deputy Speaker of the Provincial Assembly of Punjab
- Website: Official website

The Speaker of the Provincial Assembly of Punjab (Urdu: اسپیکر پنجاب اسمبلی) is the presiding official of the Punjab Assembly. Informally, the Speaker is also called Speaker Punjab Assembly.

The office originated in 1921, before Pakistan became independent. It was re-established in 1951 in accordance with the Constitution; the Speaker presides over the chamber composed of Punjab's elected representatives. The Speaker is first in the line of succession to the Governor of Punjab. He also occupies the third position in the Warrant of Precedence, after the Governor and the Chief Minister. In addition, the Speaker takes a non-partisan approach to presiding over the Assembly, and he is its spokesman to the outside world.

== Former Speakers of the Provincial Assembly of Punjab ==
Speaker of the Provincial Assembly of Punjab
Order	Speaker of the Provincial Assembly of Punjab	Duration of Service
1	Montagu Sherard Dawes Butler	03-01-1921 to 21-03-1922
2	Herbert Alexander Casson	10-05-1922 to 16-01-1925
3	Khan Bahadur Shahab-ud-Din Virk	03-12-1925 to 27-10-1926, 04-01-1927 to 26-07-1930, 25-10-1930 to 24-10-1936
4	Rao Bahadur Chhotu Ram	20-10-1936 to 10-11-1936
5	Khan Bahadur Shahab-ud-Din Virk	06-04-1937 to 19-03-1945
6	Dewan Bahadur Singha	21-03-1946 to 04-07-1947
7	Dr. Khalifa Shuja-ud-Din	07-05-1951 to 14-10-1955
8	Fazal Ilahi Chaudhry	20-05-1956 to 07-10-1958
9	Khan Bahadur Sheikh Faiz Muhammad	06-12-1962 to 08-06-1965
10	Mubin-ul-Haq Siddiqui	12-06-1962 to 04-07-1963
11	Ch. Muhammad Anwar Bhinder	16-07-1963 to 12-06-1965, 12-06-1965 to 25-03-1969
12	Rafiq Ahmad Sheikh	03-05-1972 to 11-04-1977
13	Ch. Muhammad Anwar Bhinder	11-04-1977 to 11-04-1977
14	Manzoor Wattoo	10-04-1985 to 02-12-1988, 02-12-1988 to 07-11-1990, 07-11-1990 to 25-11-1993
15	Saeed Ahmed Khan	04-05-1993 to 19-10-1993
16	Hanif Ramay	19-10-1993 to 19-02-1997
17	Chaudhry Pervaiz Elahi	19-02-1997 to 12-10-1999
18	Chaudhry Muhammad Afzal Sahi	2002 to 2007
19	Rana Muhammad Iqbal Khan	2008 to 2013, 2013 to 2018
20	Chaudhry Pervaiz Elahi	16-08-2018 to 26-07-2022
21	Muhammad Sibtain Khan	29-07-2022 - 24 February 2024
22	Malik Ahmad Khan	24 February 2024 - till date

== See also ==
- Governor of Punjab, Pakistan
- Chief Minister of Punjab
- Senior Minister of Punjab (Pakistan)
- Leader of the Opposition of Punjab (Pakistan)
- Chief Secretary Punjab
- Provincial Assembly of Punjab
- Government of Punjab, Pakistan
- Punjab, Pakistan
