= Omer Sarfraz Cheema =

Pakistani politician (born 1969)

Omar Sarfraz Cheema
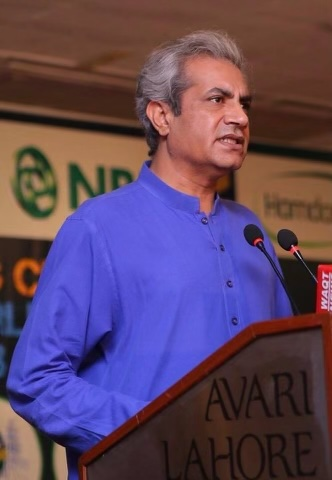

40th Governor of Punjab
- In office 3 April 2022 – 10 May 2022
- President: Arif Alvi
- Prime Minister: Imran Khan; Shehbaz Sharif
- Preceded by: Chaudhry Sarwar
- Succeeded by: Baligh Ur Rehman

Advisor the Chief Minister, Home and Prisons
- In office 13 October 2022 – 14 January 2023
- Governor: Baligh Ur Rehman
- Chief Minister: Parvez Elahi
- Preceded by: Muhammad Hashim Dogar(as Minister)

Advisor to the Chief Minister, Information
- In office 6 August 2022 – 14 January 2023
- Governor: Baligh Ur Rehman
- Chief Minister: Parvez Elahi

Personal details
- Born: Omer Sarfraz Cheema; 24 July 1969 (age 57) Gujranwala, Punjab, Pakistan
- Party: PTI (1996–present)

Omar Sarfraz Cheema (born 24 July 1969) is a Pakistani politician who has been a founding member of the Pakistan Tehreek-e-Insaf (PTI). He served as the Governor of Punjab for a little over a month, from 3 April 2022 till 10 May 2022 amidst the 2022 Constitutional crisis in Punjab, Pakistan. On advice of Prime Minister Shehbaz Sharif he was removed as Governor and ceased to hold office on 10 May 2024. Cheema was replaced by Muhammad Baligh Ur Rehman on 30 May 2022, despite resistance from the President of Pakistan, Arif Alvi. Alvi conceded and approved the replacement of Cheema. He has been held in prison since 2023 in alleged relation to the May 9 riots and has been incarcerated while being denied proper facilities while imprisoned.

== Background ==
Cheema was born on 24 July 1969, in Wazirabad, Punjab and belongs to a Jat Family. He has studied at Saint Anthony's School Lahore. He did his graduation from Government College University Lahore.

== Political career ==
He entered politics in 1996 and was a key founding member of PTI. According to PTI, he held party positions in various Tehsils.

On 3 April 2022, amidst a constitutional crisis in Punjab, Cheema was appointed as the Governor of Punjab by Imran Khan after the removal of Chaudhry Mohammad Sarwar.

Following the No-confidence motion against Imran Khan, Prime Minister Shehbaz Sharif sent a summary for the removal of Cheema as Governor of Punjab to President Arif Alvi. The president approved the summary, though the President also stated that he resisted the removal, and Cheema was removed from office on 10 May 2022.

Cheema was inducted into the cabinet of Chaudhry Parvez Elahi as the Punjab Chief Minister's advisor on information on 6 August 2022 and as advisor on Home and Prisons from 13 October 2022. He ceased to hold both offices on 14 January 2023.

On 10 May 2023, Cheema was arrested after a 4:00 AM raid on his house by authorities a day after PTI chairman Imran Khan was arrested.

=== Incarceration ===
Following his arrest, Cheema was caught in various legal troubles due to his relation with the May 9 riots. He was held in jail on judicial remand which was later extended by the Anti-Terrorism Court (ATC). On 22 June 2023 Cheema's wife, Rabia Sultan was arrested while waiting outside the ATC in Lahore. Authorities alleged Cheema and Rabia had a relation to the May 9 riots. Cheema is currently incarcerated, and his wife has alleged that he is not being provided with basic needs or facilities while imprisoned by the authorities.

On 22 November, Cheema was re-arrested in a case related to the May 9 riots, which PTI alleges is a false flag operation.

Political offices
Preceded by Mohammad Sarwar	Governor of Punjab; 3 April 2022 – 10 May 2022	Succeeded by Muhammad Baligh Ur Rehman
