= Deputy Prime Minister of Pakistan =

Second-highest office in the Cabinet of Pakistan

- نائب وزيراعظم پاكستان
- State emblem of Pakistan

- Flag of the deputy prime minister of Pakistan

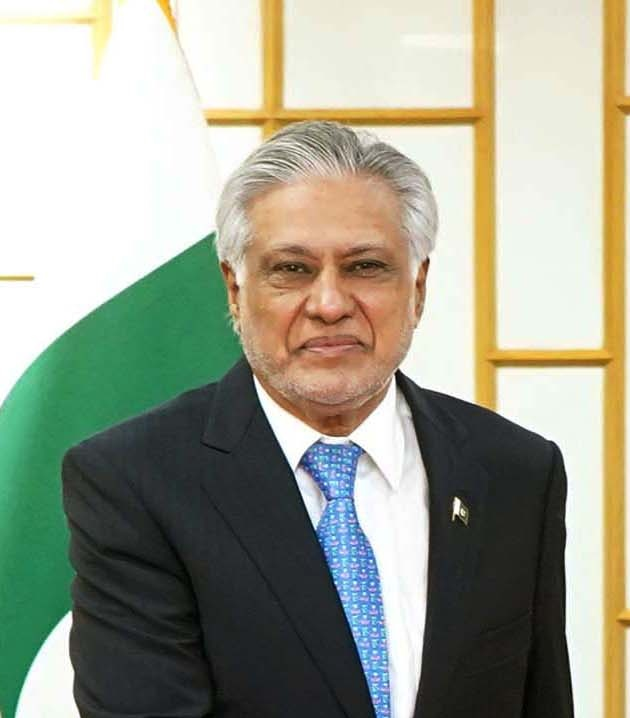
- Incumbent; Ishaq Dar since 28 April 2024
- Style: His Excellency
- Reports to: Prime Minister of Pakistan
- Appointer: National Assembly of Pakistan
- Term length: Five years; expires with the dissolution of the National Assembly
- Inaugural holder: Zulfiqar Ali Bhutto
- Formation: 7 December 1971; 54 years ago
- Website: Government of Pakistan

The Deputy Prime Minister of Pakistan, (Note: Urdu: نائب وزيراعظم پاكستان, romanized: Nā'ib Wazīr-ē Aʿẓam Pākistān; lit. 'Vice Grand Vizier of Pakistan') formerly known as the Senior Minister of Pakistan, is the second-highest office within the federal cabinet of Pakistan, with the officeholder being deputy to the prime minister. The main purpose of the post was to give a backup to the government in the absence of the Prime Minister.

As a result of a 2012 agreement between the ruling Pakistan People's Party (PPP) and the PML-Q to share ministries in the federal cabinet, Chaudhry Pervaiz Elahi was made the first deputy prime minister. For eleven years (2013-2024) the office remained vacant until Shehbaz Sharif appointed Ishaq Dar as Deputy Prime Minister as an additional charge to Dar's portfolio of Foreign Minister.

== Deputy Prime Minister of Pakistan ==
No.	Portrait	Name (Birth–Death)	Took office	Left office	Political party (Alliance)	Remarks
Deputy Prime Minister
1		Zulfikar Ali Bhutto (1928–1979)	7 December 1971	20 December 1971	Pakistan People's Party	Status of first Deputy Prime minister of Pakistan.
Senior Minister
2	Nusrat Bhutto	Begum Nusrat Bhutto (1929–2011)	31 March 1989	6 August 1990	Pakistan People's Party	First female Senior Minister of Pakistan
3		Rao Sikandar Iqbal (1943–2010)	23 November 2002	15 November 2007	PPP	
4		Chaudhry Nisar Ali Khan (born 1954)	31 March 2008	13 May 2008	PMLN	Served for 1 month and 13 days as senior minister.
Deputy Prime Minister
5		Parvez Elahi (born 1945)	25 June 2012	16 March 2013	Pakistan Muslim League (Q)	Following negotiations between the PPP and PML(Q), Elahi became deputy prime minister while 15 other members of PML(Q) were included in the Cabinet. Also described as the "first" deputy minister.
6		Ishaq Dar (born 1950)	28 April 2024	Incumbent	PMLN	On April 28, Shehbaz Sharif appointed Ishaq Dar as the first deputy prime minister since Pervaiz Elahi, Dar continues to hold portfolio as foreign minister.

== History ==
Nusrat Bhutto served as Senior Federal Minister of the Cabinet in her daughter's government. She is often described as deputy prime minister. Before that Z.A. Bhutto served as the first deputy prime minister of Pakistan in Nurul Amin's regime.

On 25 June 2012, Chaudhry Pervez Elahi was appointed as the deputy prime minister of Pakistan. He also held different offices in the federal cabinet. The post, for which there is no constitutional provision, was a result of the agreement between the government and PML-Q leadership. The notification described that Elahi's appointment was carried out on immediate basis and will be valid until a new order is issued. The notification further stated that "Elahi will not possess the powers of the prime minister". Following negotiations between the Pakistan Peoples Party (PPP) and Pakistan Muslim League (Q) (PML-Q), Chaudhry Pervaiz Elahi was appointed Deputy Prime Minister and 15 members of his party were inducted into the Federal Cabinet.

On April 28, 2024, Shehbaz Sharif through a notification issued by the Cabinet Division appointed Ishaq Dar as Deputy Prime Minister.

== Powers and responsibilities ==
The post is symbolic, non-constitutional and without specific authorities, created only to ceremonially protect the space of the prime minister in his/her absence. The post does not carry particular responsibilities, although it is granted oversight over a number of ministries in the cabinet and the deputy prime minister works in his/her capacity as a "Senior federal minister". Chaudhry Pervaiz Elahi had worked as a Senior minister in the cabinet of former Prime Minister Yousuf Raza Gilani, another post without any reasonable powers. Previously, the Senior minister post was occupied by Begum Nusrat Bhutto and Chaudhry Nisar Ali Khan, in the governments of Benazir Bhutto and Nawaz Sharif, respectively. Due to the ambiguity of any constitutional definition of Ishaq Dar's role as Deputy Prime Minister, his current duties and authorities are uncertain in the office.

== 2012 Constitutional petition ==
On 28 June 2012, a petition was filed in the Supreme Court of Pakistan against the validity of the post. The petitioner told the court there is no space for any such position in the Constitution of Pakistan and insisted the court to dismiss the post. The post was also challenged in the Lahore High Court under the violation to the article 91 of the constitution. The petitioner appealed the court that "this appointment was ill-intended and should be declared void." A petition was also filed in the Sindh High Court which was rejected by the court.

== See also ==
- Vice President of Pakistan
