= Qazi Adnan Fareed =

Pakistani politician

Member of the Provincial Assembly of the Punjab
- In office 29 May 2013 – 31 May 2018

Personal details
- Born: 1 July 1977 (age 49) Bahawalpur
- Party: PMLN

Qazi Adnan Fareed is a Pakistani politician who was a Member of the Provincial Assembly of the Punjab, from May 2013 to May 2018.

== Early life and education ==
He was born on 1 July 1977 in Bahawalpur.

He did hisbachelor of laws L.L.B from Islamic University, Bahawalpur. He has a degree of Master of Laws which he obtained in 2007 from London Metropolitan University.

== Political career ==
He was elected to the Provincial Assembly of the Punjab as a candidate of Pakistan Muslim League (Nawaz) from Constituency PP-268 (Bahawalpur-II) in the 2013 Pakistani general election.
