= Aslam Riaz Hussain =

Former judge of Pakistan (c. 1924-2004)

Justice Aslam Riaz Hussain

Judge of Supreme Court of Pakistan
- In office 19 September 1978 – 23 August 1988

19th Governor of Punjab
- In office July 1977 – September 1978
- President: Muhammad Zia-ul-Haq

Chief Justice of Lahore High Court
- In office 1976–1978

Personal details
- Born: c. 1924
- Died: 10 September 2004 (aged 79–80) Lahore, Pakistan
- Resting place: Shadman Colony
- Education: Government College University, Lahore • Punjab University Law College (PULC)

Aslam Riaz Hussain (c. 1924 – 10 March 2004) was a Pakistani jurist and the first ombudsman who served as the 28th chief justice of the Lahore High Court from 1976 to 1978, and the 19th governor of Punjab from July 1977 to September 1978. In 1978, he was appointed as a judge of the Supreme Court of Pakistan.

== Biography ==
He was born to Tasaddaq Husain who was a poet and an assistant advocate-general of the Punjab Province. His mother, Begum Salma Tasaddaq Husain was a political activist and one of the two women elected to the Punjab Legislative Assembly on the ticket of All-India Muslim League in the 1946 Indian provincial elections.

He received his education from Central Model School and later went to Government College, Lahore. As a classmate of justice Javed Iqbal, he met Muhammad Iqbal several times. He later went to London where he obtained his legal profession from Lincoln's Inn in 1958.

In 1962 he served as an assistant advocate general until he was appointed as an additional advocate-general of West Pakistan in 1969, and a year after he was appointed as a judge of the West Pakistan High Court in 1970.

He was also appointed governor of Punjab when Muhammad Zia-ul-Haq declared military coup.

He died on 10 March 2004 in Lahore, Pakistan. He is buried in his family cemetery at Shadman Colony, Gulberg, Lahore.
