= Muhammad Riaz Malik =

Pakistani politician

Muhammad Malik Riaz
- محمد ملک ریاض

Member of the National Assembly of Pakistan
- In office 13 August 2018 – 10 August 2023
- Constituency: NA-123 (Lahore-I)
- In office 2008 – 31 May 2018
- Constituency: NA-118 (Lahore-I)

Personal details
- Born: 15 May 1959 (age 67) Lahore, Punjab, Pakistan
- Party: PMLN (2008-present)

Muhammad Riaz Malik (Urdu: محمد ریاض ملک; born 15 May 1959) is a Pakistani politician who had been a member of the National Assembly of Pakistan from August 2018 till August 2023. Previously he was a member of the National Assembly from 2008 to May 2018.

== Early life ==
He was born on 15 May 1959.

== Political career ==
He was elected to the National Assembly of Pakistan as a candidate of Pakistan Muslim League (N) (PML-N) from Constituency NA-118 (Lahore-I) in the 2008 Pakistani general election. He received 55,900 votes and defeated Syed Asif Hashmi, a candidate of Pakistan Peoples Party (PPP).

He was re-elected to the National Assembly as a candidate of PML-N from Constituency NA-118 (Lahore-I) in the 2013 Pakistani general election. He received 103,346 votes and defeated Hamid Zaman, a candidate of Pakistan Tehreek-e-Insaf.

He was re-elected to the National Assembly as a candidate of PML-N from Constituency NA-123 (Lahore-I) in the 2018 Pakistani general election.
