= Malik Salah-ud-Din Dogar =

Pakistani politician

Senator of Pakistan
- In office March 2009 – March 2015
- Constituency: Punjab

Personal details
- Party: Pakistan People's Party Parliamentarian (PPPP)
- Profession: Politician

Malik Salah-ud-Din Dogar (died; 8 December 2012) was a Pakistani politician who served as a senator from March 2009 to Dec 2012. He represented the province of Punjab and was a member of the Pakistan People's Party Parliamentarian (PPPP).

He is considered one of the founders of the Dogar dynasty of Multan, who started his politics in the 1985 non-partisan elections.In the 1985 elections, he contested against Rafique Rajwana for the Multan walled city seat, in which he won.

He had four sons, one of whom is deceased, while two are currently members of Parliament, After 2024 Elections.

Dogar died in Shaikh Zayed Hospital, Lahore on 8 December 2012 at the age of 70. He was suffering from liver complications.
