= Constituency W-352 =

Provincial constituency of Punjab, Pakistan

W-352
- Woman Reserved constituency for the Provincial Assembly of Punjab

Current constituency

W-352 is a reserved Constituency for female in the Provincial Assembly of Punjab.

== See also ==
- Punjab, Pakistan
