= Parvez Elahi =

Pakistani politician (born 1945)

Chaudhry Parvez Elahi
- پرویز الٰہی
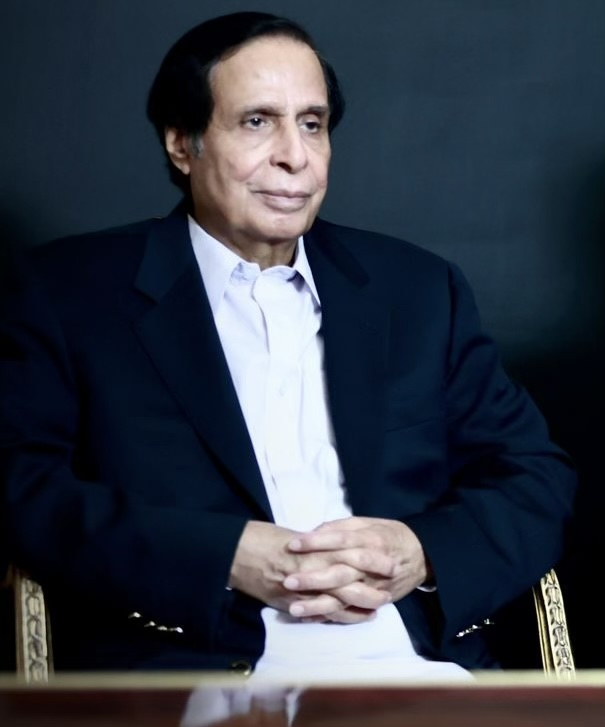
- Elahi in 2023

President of Pakistan Tehreek-e-Insaf
- Incumbent
- Assumed office 7 March 2023
- Chairman: Imran Khan; Gohar Ali Khan
- Preceded by: Javed Hashmi

5th Deputy Prime Minister of Pakistan
- In office 25 June 2012 – 29 June 2013
- President: Asif Zardari
- Prime Minister: Raja Pervaiz Ashraf
- Preceded by: Nisar Ali Khan (as Senior Minister)
- Succeeded by: Ishaq Dar

20th Federal Minister for Industries
- In office 3 May 2011 – 30 November 2013
- President: Asif Ali Zardari; Mamnoon Hussain
- Prime Minister: Yusuf Raza Gillani; Raja Pervaiz Ashraf; Nawaz Sharif

Federal Minister for Defence Production
- In office May 2011 – June 2012

7th Leader of the Opposition
- In office 10 April 2008 – 16 September 2008
- President: Pervez Musharraf; Muhammad Mian Soomro; Asif Ali Zardari
- Prime Minister: Yusuf Raza Gillani
- Preceded by: Fazal-ur-Rehman
- Succeeded by: Nisar Ali Khan

Governor of Punjab
- In office 18 August 2018 – 5 September 2018
- Preceded by: Rafique Rajwana
- Succeeded by: Mohammad Sarwar

14th & 18th Chief Minister of Punjab
- In office 27 July 2022 – 22 January 2023
- Governor: Muhammad Baligh Ur Rehman
- Preceded by: Usman Buzdar
- Succeeded by: Mohsin Raza Naqvi (caretaker)
- In office 29 November 2002 – 18 November 2007
- Governor: Khalid Maqbool
- Preceded by: Shehbaz Sharif
- Succeeded by: Ejaz Nisar (acting)

17th & 20th Speaker of Punjab Assembly
- In office 19 February 1997 – 12 October 1999
- Preceded by: Hanif Ramay
- Succeeded by: Muhammad Afzal Sahi
- In office 16 August 2018 – 26 July 2022
- Preceded by: Rana Muhammad Iqbal Khan
- Succeeded by: Muhammad Sibtain Khan

Acting Leader of the Opposition in Punjab Assembly
- In office 20 October 1993 – 16 November 1996
- Leader: Shehbaz Sharif

Minister for Local Bodies and Rural Development of Punjab
- In office 9 April 1985 – 25 April 1993

Member of the National Assembly of Pakistan
- In office 1 June 2013 – 31 May 2018
- Constituency: NA-105 (Gujrat-II)
- In office 17 March 2008 – 16 March 2013
- Constituency: NA-58 (Attock-II)

Member of the Provincial Assembly of Punjab
- In office 15 August 2018 – 14 January 2023
- Constituency: PP-30 (Gujrat-III)
- In office 25 November 2002 – 17 November 2007
- Constituency: PP-292 (Rahimyar Khan-VIII)

Personal details
- Born: 1 November 1945 (age 81) Gujrat, Punjab, British India
- Party: PTI (2023–present)
- Other political affiliations: PML-Q (2002–2023); PMLN (1993–1999); Islami Jamhoori Ittehad (1985–1993)
- Spouse: Qaisra Elahi
- Children: 2, including Moonis Elahi
- Relatives: See Chaudhry family
- Education: Forman Christian College; West Herts College
- Website: parvezelahi.com

Chaudhry Parvez Elahi Warraich (Note: Also spelt as Chauhdary Parvez Elahi, Chaudhary Parvez Elahi, or referred to as Pervaiz Elahi or Pervez Elahi.: Punjabi and Urdu: چوہدری پرویز الٰہی وڑائچ) (born 1 November 1945) is a Pakistani politician who was the fifth deputy prime minister of Pakistan from 2012 to 2013, and twice the chief minister of Punjab from 2002 to 2007 and from 2022 to 2023. He has been the president of the Pakistan Tehreek-e-Insaf since 2023. Elahi held two federal cabinet portfolios between 2011 and 2013, being a member of the National Assembly between 2008 and 2018 and the leader of the opposition in 2008. During his political career in Punjab, he was a provincial minister from 1985 to 1993; twice the speaker of the Punjab Assembly from 1997 to 1999 and 2018 to 2022; and briefly governor of the province in 2018.

He was a member of the Provincial Assembly of the Punjab from August 2018 till January 2023, when he, as chief minister, dissolved the assembly. In 2023, he left the Pakistan Muslim League (Q) (PML(Q)) and joined Pakistan Tehreek-e-Insaf (PTI) along with his son, Moonis Elahi, and 10 other former PML(Q) MPAs over political rifts with the party president and cousin, Chaudhry Shujaat Hussain. He was appointed as, and is currently serving as the president of the PTI. He also served as the president of the Punjab Division of the PML(Q).

He served as the First Deputy Prime Minister of Pakistan in 2013. After a successful campaign in the 2002 general elections, he became the Chief Minister of Punjab and held this position until 2007. In 2008, he briefly served as the leader of the opposition in the National Assembly of Pakistan. He remained a member of the National Assembly for two terms, from 2008 to May 2018. He has also been the Speaker of the Provincial Assembly of Punjab from 2018 to 2022. In a major development in late February 2023, Parvez Elahi announced joining Imran Khan-led party along with 10 of his party's former MPAs. On 7 March 2023, Parvez Elahi was appointed as President of the Pakistan Tehreek-e-Insaf.

== Early life and education ==
Chaudhry Parvez Elahi was born 1 November 1945 in Gujrat, Punjab to industrialist Chaudhry Manzoor Elahi. He hails from a family of politicians and industrialists of Gujrat. He belongs to a Punjabi family of Jat (Warraich) origin.

Parvez received his early education from Forman Christian College, Lahore until 1967 and later attended Watford College of Technology from where he received his Diploma in Industrial Management.

== Political career ==
=== Early political career (1985-1999) ===
Parvez began his political career after being elected as the chairman of the district council of Gujrat for four years in 1983. He served as Provincial Minister for Local Government and Rural Development for eight years from 1985 to 1993. He was elected as a member of the Provincial Assembly of Punjab for the first time in 1985, again in 1988, 1990, and 1993. He also served as the acting leader of the opposition in the Provincial Assembly of Punjab from 1993

During the late 1980s and 1990s Pakistani politics was dominated by two movements, the conservative, right-wing Islamic Jamhoori Ittehad (IJI) led by Nawaz Sharif, and the more left-wing Pakistan Peoples Party (PPP) led by Benazir Bhutto. Parvez Elahi and the Chaudhry family followed a more traditionalist and conservative outlook, therefore Parvez and Shujaat Hussain sided with Nawaz Sharif and both joined the Islami Jamhoori Ittehad from 1985 to 1993, until joining the IJI’s successor, the Pakistan Muslim League (N) (PML-N).

Several cases were registered against Pervaiz during Benazir Bhutto's government in 1993-1996 and he was sent to Adiala Jail where he spent several months. He enjoyed the services of Mentorship of Barrister Ijaz Hussain Batalvi and his legal team including M.A. Zafar, Nawaz Bhatti and Akhtar Aly Kureshy Advocates. He also appointed Akhtar Aly Kureshy as legal Advisor to Provincial Assembly of the Punjab when he was Speaker of the Punjab Assembly.

It was reported that Nawaz Sharif had promised Parvez that if PML-N won the 1997 Pakistani general election, Pervaiz would be made the chief minister of Punjab. However, when PML-N won the 1997 general elections, Nawaz appointed his brother Shahbaz Sharif as the Chief Minister of Punjab. To avoid the impression that Pervaiz was unhappy with this decision of Nawaz Sharif, Pervaiz supported Shahbaz Sharif for the position of Chief Minister, however, he decided not to join the provincial cabinet of Shahbaz Sharif. He was re-elected as a member of the Provincial Assembly of Punjab for the fifth time in 1997 and was elected as the speaker of Provincial Assembly of Punjab in 1997 where he remained until June 2001.

=== Alliance with Musharraf, Rise of PML-Q ===
Following the 1999 military coup, he was detained by the National Accountability Bureau on corruption charges. The charges were dropped following an agreement he made to quit the PML-N, whose part he had been until the ouster of the PML-N government, and assist President Pervez Musharraf in building the Pakistan Muslim League (Q) (PML-Q).

He along with his cousin Shujaat and other dissidents left PML-N to form their own party, PML-Q, of which he became a top member. He was re-elected as a member of the Provincial Assembly of Punjab for the sixth time in the 2002 Punjab provincial election. Following the elections, Parvez was elected as the Chief Minister of Punjab for the first time, an office he served from October 2002 until October 2007.

== First Term as Chief Minister of Punjab (2002-2007) ==
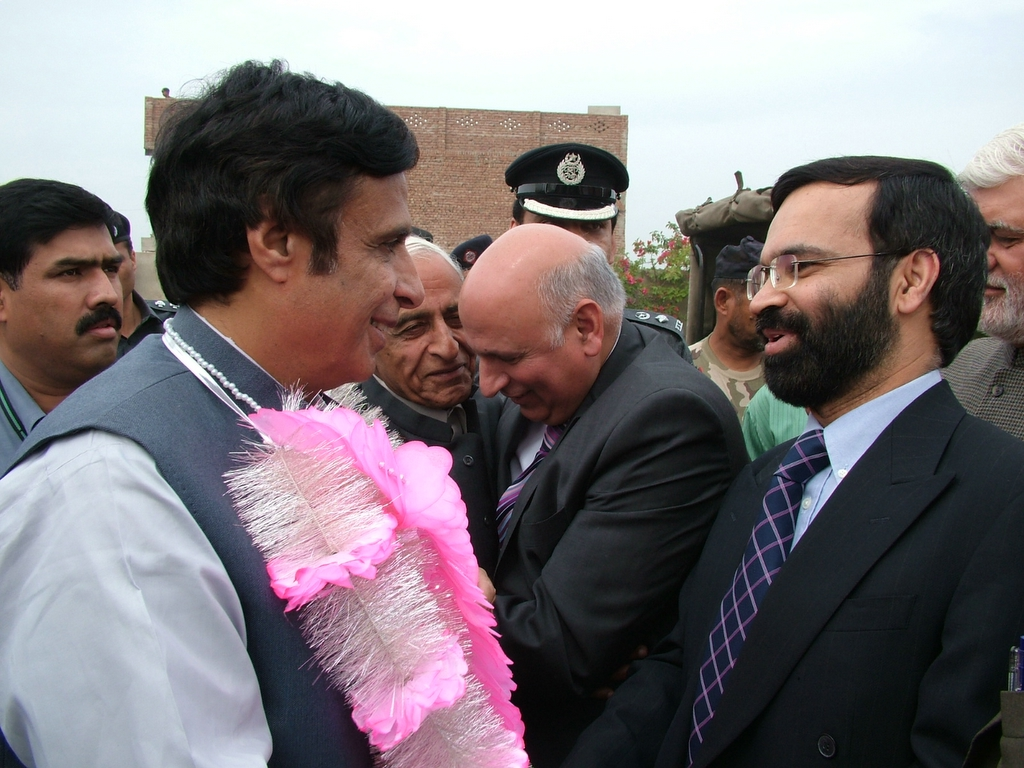
Parvez (left) as Chief Minister of Punjab in 2006

Parvez Elahi was sworn in as Chief Minister of Punjab on 29 November 2002 while most of the ministers in his provincial cabinet were sworn in January 2003. His first tenure oversaw a period of political stability with him holding the Military-backed President, Governor and Prime Minister's support. Because of this, he was able to serve a full tenure, and was able to initiate many programs and initiatives. His provincial cabinet was composed largely of new politicians from the PML (Q), including Muhammad Basharat Raja, Mian Aslam Iqbal, Aleem Khan and Sibtain Khan while his governor would be Khalid Maqbool, appointed by Pervez Musharraf.

As Chief Minister of Punjab, Parvez initiated several initiatives to develop the province, including the Multan Institute of Cardiology, which Elahi founded and worked to establish. Some of his most successful projects include the Rescue 1122 helpline system, the University of Gujrat, the Lahore Ring Road and several other irrigation and social projects that were founded in his tenure. He has received appraisal for his work as Chief Minister.

=== Education sector ===
In 2004, his administration introduced the Female Secondary School Stipend program as part of the Punjab Education Sector Reforms Programme (PESRP). The program aimed to improve female enrollment in public schools, focusing on 15 of Punjab's lowest-literacy districts. Evaluations conducted by the World Bank using difference-in-difference (DD) and regression-discontinuity design (RDD) analyses indicated a 9% increase in female enrollments and an average addition of six female students per school between 2003 and 2005. However, enrollment rates had already been rising prior to the program's implementation, suggesting the FSSS program was one of several factors contributing to this trend. Additionally, the evaluations primarily assessed enrollment impacts, with less emphasis on broader educational outcomes such as learning quality or test scores. This initiative was part of broader efforts to enhance education access and quality in Punjab.

== Post-Chief ministership ==
=== Federal Minister and Deputy Prime Minister ===
In the 2008 Pakistani general election, Pervaiz was elected as a member of the National Assembly of Pakistan for the first time and as a member of the Provincial Assembly of Punjab for the seventh time. The PML-Q nominated Pervaiz as its candidate for the post of prime minister of Pakistan following the 2008 general elections. Following the election, he was made the Leader of the Opposition in the National Assembly, however he quit this post later that year. He was made Federal Minister for Defence Production and Industries in the Yousuf Raza Gilani cabinet.

In 2011, a ceremonial post was created to appoint Parvez as the first deputy prime minister of Pakistan, having no powers even in the absence of the prime minister of Pakistan. In the 2013 Pakistani general election, Pervaiz contested and won election from NA-105, a National Assembly constituency in Gujrat defeating candidates of PPP and PML-N.

He was re-elected to the National Assembly as a candidate of PML-Q from NA-65 (Chakwal-II) and NA-69 (Gujrat-II) in the 2018 Pakistani general election. In the same election, he was re-elected to the Provincial Assembly of Punjab as a candidate of PML-Q from PP-30 (Gujrat-III). Following his successful election, he abandoned his National Assembly seats in favor of his provincial assembly seat.

=== Speaker of the Punjab Assembly ===
He was named by Pakistan Tehreek-e-Insaf (PTI) and PML-Q as their joint candidate for the office of Speaker of the Provincial Assembly of Punjab. On 16 August 2018, he was elected as Speaker of the Punjab Assembly. He received 201 votes against his opponent Muhammad Iqbal Gujjar who secured 147 votes. On 19 August 2018, he became the acting governor of Punjab following the resignation of Rafique Rajwana.

== Second Term as Chief Minister of Punjab (2022-2023) ==
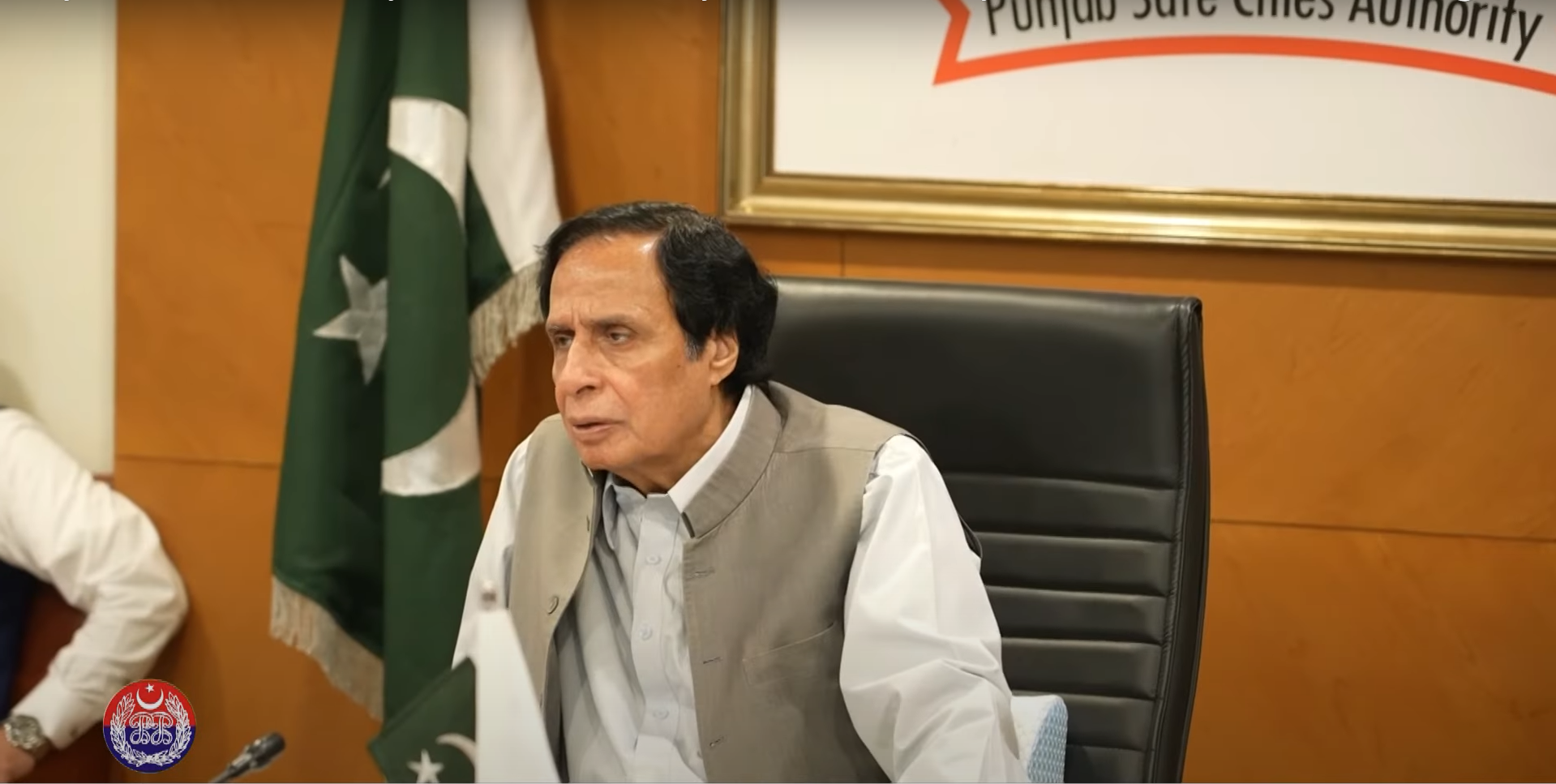
Parvez in his second tenure at the Punjab Safe Cities Authority.

In March 2022, Imran Khan nominated Parvez Elahi as a candidate for the post of Chief Minister of Punjab after the incumbent Usman Buzdar resigned. After a four-month long constitutional crisis, he took oath as the 18th Chief Minister of Punjab on 27 July. During his second tenure as Chief Minister, he approved schemes worth Rs.15 Billion in order to provide quality and up-to-date medical services and equipment to areas of Punjab including hospitals in Multan, Faisalabad and Gujrat. He also approved the upgrade of hospital wards and the distribution of free medicines across the province.

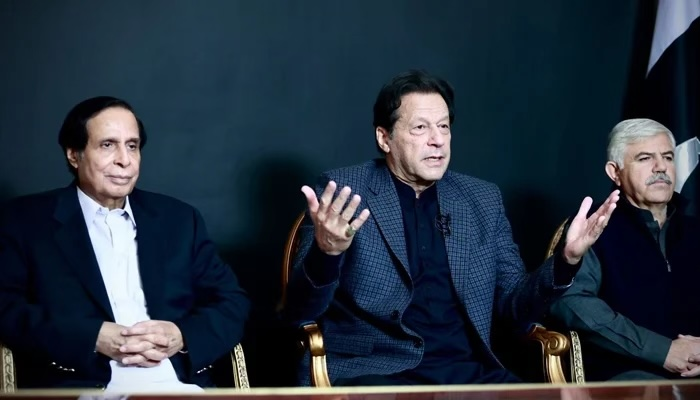
Parvez Elahi (left) with Imran Khan (centre) and Mahmood Khan (right) announcing the dissolution of the Punjab and KPK assemblies.

On 22 December, the Governor of Punjab, Balighur Rehman, denotified Elahi from his position, citing his failure to take a vote of confidence from the Provincial Assembly, which the Governor had requested, as the reason for the de notification. However, Elahi was restored by the Lahore High Court on 23 December 2022.

On 12 January 2023, after securing victory in a vote of confidence the night before, Parvez sent a letter to Governor Balighur Ur Rehman, advising him to dissolve the Provincial Assembly. On 22 January, he was replaced as Chief Minister by Mohsin Raza Naqvi, who was appointed by the Election Commission of Pakistan to lead a caretaker government.

== President of Pakistan Tehreek-e-Insaf ==
In late February 2023, Parvez Elahi announced joining the Imran Khan-led PTI party along with 10 of his party's former MPAs. His decision was said to have marked a split between him and his cousin Shujaat Hussain.

In March 2023, Parvez Elahi was appointed as President of Pakistan Tehreek-e-Insaf by Imran Khan after Elahi had reassured support for the party following its 2022 ousting from power. In June 2023, Elahi was arrested on charges of illegally appointing officers in the Punjab Assembly when he was Chief Minister and detained in Rawalpindi. Elahi denied the charges, calling it political persecution.

He was stated to be in the run for a seat in the Punjab Assembly from PP-34 Gujrat-VII as a candidate of the PTI in the 2024 Punjab provincial election. Due to his imprisonment he was unable to contest in the elections, and instead, Parvez’s wife, Qaisara Elahi ran in his place from PP-32 Gujrat-VI and NA-64 Gujrat-III against their nephew, Chaudhry Salik Hussain. Officially, Qaisara lost both seats though both Qaisara and Parvez claimed that the seat was rigged. Qaisara filed petitions in the Supreme Court of Pakistan (SCP) and Election Commission of Pakistan (ECP), in which she stated that she won as per Form 45s.

During his imprisonment, he faced several medical issues, including a major spinal fracture after falling in a jail washroom. He was released from jail on bail in May 2024, then rearrested.

== See also ==
- Moonis Elahi

== Notes ==
Political offices
| Preceded by Shahbaz Sharif | Chief Minister of Punjab; 2002–2007 | Succeeded by: Ejaz Nisar; Acting |
| Preceded by Fazal-ur-Rehman | Leader of the Opposition; 2008 | Succeeded by Nisar Ali Khan |
| New office | Deputy Prime Minister of Pakistan; 2012–2013 | Succeeded by Ishaq Dar |
