= Sheikh Ijaz Nisar =

Pakistani judge

Chief Minister of Punjab
- Caretaker
- In office 19 November 2007 – 11 April 2008
- Governor: Khalid Maqbool
- Preceded by: Parvez Elahi
- Succeeded by: Dost Muhammad Khosa

Justice of the Supreme Court of Pakistan
- In office 29 May 1997 – 26 January 2000

Chief Justice of Lahore High Court
- In office 1996–1997
- Preceded by: Khalil-Ur-Rehman Khan
- Succeeded by: Sheikh Riaz Ahmad

Justice of the Lahore High Court
- In office July 1983 – 1997

Personal details
- Born: 15 June 1935 (age 91) Sahiwal, Punjab, British India
- Died: 5 November 2015 (aged 80) Lahore, Pakistan
- Education: University of the Punjab; Government College Sahiwal

Sheikh Ijaz Nisar (Urdu: شیخ اعجاز نثار) was a Pakistani judge who served as Chief Justice of the Lahore High Court. He was also the caretaker Chief Minister of Punjab, Pakistan from 19 November 2007 to 11 April 2008. He is chairman of Nazaria-i-Pakistan Trust.

Political offices
Preceded by Chaudhry Pervaiz Elahi	Chief Minister of Punjab; 2007–2008	Succeeded by Dost Muhammad Khosa
