= Rafique Rajwana =

Pakistani politician

Malik Muhammad Rafique Rajwana
- ملک محمد رفیق رجوانہ
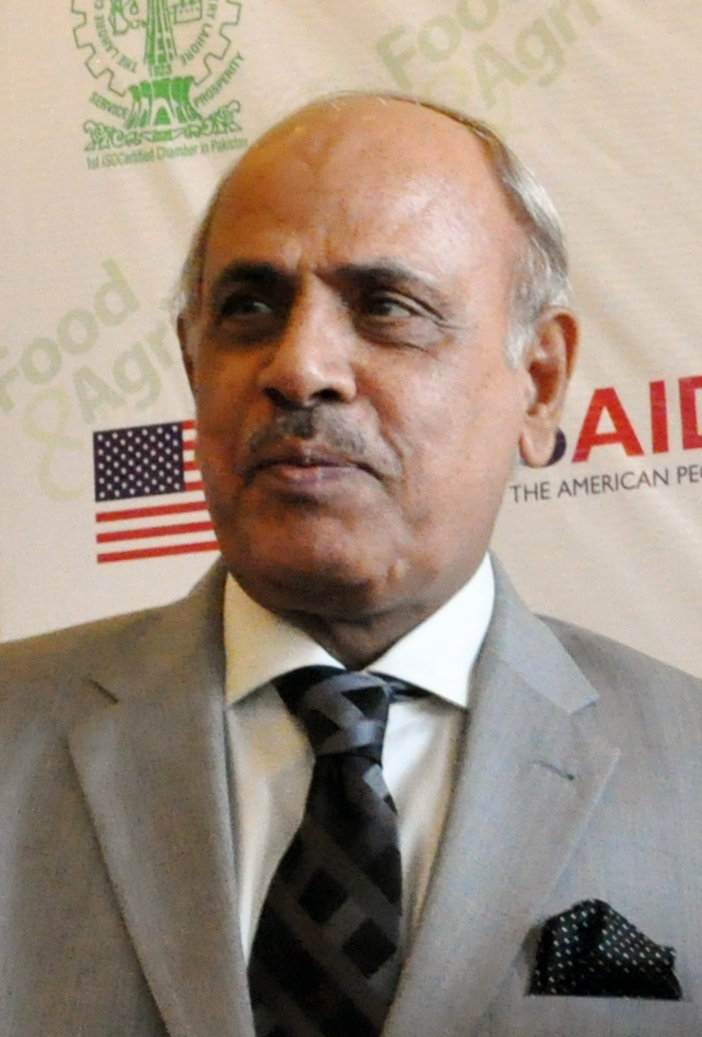

38th Governor of Punjab
- In office 10 May 2015 – 18 August 2018
- President: Mamnoon Hussain
- Prime Minister: Nawaz Sharif; Shahid Khaqan Abbasi; Nasirul Mulk (caretaker)
- Preceded by: Chaudhry Mohammad Sarwar
- Succeeded by: Chaudhry Mohammad Sarwar

Pakistani Senator from Punjab
- In office 12 March 2012 – 7 May 2015
- President: Asif Ali Zardari
- Prime Minister: Raja Pervaiz Ashraf
- In office 3 June 1997 – 5 July 1999

Personal details
- Born: Muhammad Rafique Rajwana; 20 February 1949 (age 77) Multan, West Punjab, Pakistan
- Party: Pakistan Muslim League (N)
- Education: Forman Christian College
- Profession: Lawyer

Rafique Rajwana (Punjabi: ملک محمد رفیق رجواݨا; Urdu: ملک محمد رفیق رجوانہ; born 20 February 1949) has served as the 39th Governor of Punjab, in office from 10 May 2015 to 18 August 2018. He is affiliated with PML-N.

He conducted landmark cases, including Mian Nawaz Sharif, Memogate Scandal, Election expenses, Alstom Energy Ltd, Rally Energy Ltd and Liverpool Cotton Association. He was the chairman of the parliamentary committee for appointment of the Chief Election Commissioner of Pakistan in 2014.

== Early life ==
Rajwana is a native of Multan in southern Punjab. Rajwana graduated from Government Emerson College Multan and earned a master's degree in Economics from Forman Christian College University, Lahore.

In the 1980s, he joined the Punjab Judiciary Service but left to pursue law and contested the 1985 non-partisan election as MPA from Multan Inner City constituency. He faced Malik Salah-ud-Din Dogar, in which he lost And Dogar went to Punjab Assembly first time.

== Career ==
Rajwana joined the judiciary in 1987, resigning, later to start law firm Rajwana & Rajwana. In 1996, he was elected as President of High Court Bar Association Multan. His core areas of practice are Civil, Company, Alternate Dispute Resolution and Arbitration.

He served as senator from southern Punjab in 2012. Rajwana is the senior Advocate Supreme Court of Pakistan.

In February 2014, he was appointed chair of the parliamentary committee for appointment of Chief Election Commissioner of Pakistan.

Rajwana has been member of senate committees for Foreign Affairs, Law, Justice and Human Rights, Government Assurances, Committee on Rules of Procedure and Privileges, Senate House Committee, Devolution Process

On May 10, 2015 he became the 39th Governor of Punjab.

Political offices
Preceded by Mohammad Sarwar	Governor of Punjab; 07 May 2015	Succeeded by Inc
