= 2022 Punjab, Pakistan constitutional crisis =

2022 political crisis in Punjab, Pakistan

Constitutional crisis in Punjab, Pakistan (2022)
- Date: 28 March 2022 – 26 July 2022
- Location: Punjab province, Pakistan
- Caused by: Resignation of Usman Buzdar and subsequent dispute over the appointment of his successor as Chief Minister of Punjab
- Result: Election of Hamza Shehbaz as Chief Minister of Punjab, with the support of defectors from PTI Re-interpretation of Article 63A by the Supreme Court of the constitution to prevent party-switchers from voting against the party they were elected on De-seating of PTI MPAs that voted for Hamza Shehbaz Subsequent victory of PTI in the by-elections Election of Pervez Elahi as CM after controversy around the interpretation made by the SC

Parties
Pakistan Tehreek-e-Insaf (ruling party)	Pakistan Muslim League (opposition)

Lead figures
Imran Khan	Hamza Shehbaz Sharif

The constitutional crisis in Pakistan's Punjab province began on 28 March 2022, when Usman Buzdar tendered his resignation as Chief Minister at the request of Prime Minister Imran Khan and nominated former Chief Minister Chaudhry Pervaiz Elahi to replace him. On 1 April 2022, his resignation was accepted by then Governor of Punjab, Chaudary Mohammed Sarwar.

The resignation of Usman Buzdar became necessary after it became clear that Buzdar no longer enjoyed the support of the provincial assembly. Although Imran Khan initially resisted the idea of Buzdar being removed, he eventually negotiated a deal with Elahi's PML (Q), in which Elahi's party would support Imran Khan in the no confidence motion which was tabled in the National Assembly in return for Elahi being nominated as Chief Minister by PTI. However, A group of 25 Pakistan Tehreek-e-Insaf (PTI) MPAs defected from their party and decided to support opposition leader Hamza Shehbaz Sharif for the post of Chief Minister instead.

== April CM election ==
- 2 April – After the resignation of Buzdar, the meeting of the Punjab Assembly was convened on 2 April 2022 to elect a new Chief Minister. Meanwhile Muhammad Khan Bhatti, Secretary of the Provincial Assembly said that the candidates would submit their nomination papers today while voting for the election of a new Chief Minister is likely to take place tomorrow or Monday.
- 3 April – The session of Punjab Assembly which started late and last only for 6 minutes under the chairmanship of then Deputy Speaker Dost Muhammad Mazari, was adjourned till April 6 as the Deputy Speaker attributed the adjournment to commotion. No election for CM is held.
- 5 April – Deputy Speaker Mazari issued a statement to convene the meeting on 16 April. And then late at night the date of the meeting was changed again to 6 April.
- 6 April – The Secretary of the Assembly said that the notification of the meeting is dated 16 April and it will be considered. He further said that the meeting was never convened on plain paper, a gazette notification has to be issued to convene the meeting.
  In the symbolic session of the Punjab Assembly, and in protest of the delay, 199 members passed a resolution to elect Hamza Shahbaz as the Chief Minister. After the doors of the Punjab Assembly were closed, the opposition convened a symbolic meeting at a local hotel. Jahangir Tareen and Abdul Aleem Khan Group members attended.

=== No-confidence motions against Speaker and Deputy speaker ===
- 6 April – PML-N files a no-confidence motion against Speaker Elahi, PTI leaders file a counter-motion of no confidence against Deputy Speaker Mazari. The date for the CM election is delayed to 16 April. After an appeal by PML-N because of the delay, Lahore High Court rules that the election must go ahead on 16 April.

=== Riots and brawl ===
- 16 April - Opposition candidate Hamza Shahbaz was elected the new Chief Minister with 197 votes, 25 of which were from PTI members voting against party directions. Riots and violence ensued in the assembly, with both opposition and government members damaged.

== Aftermath of April CM election ==
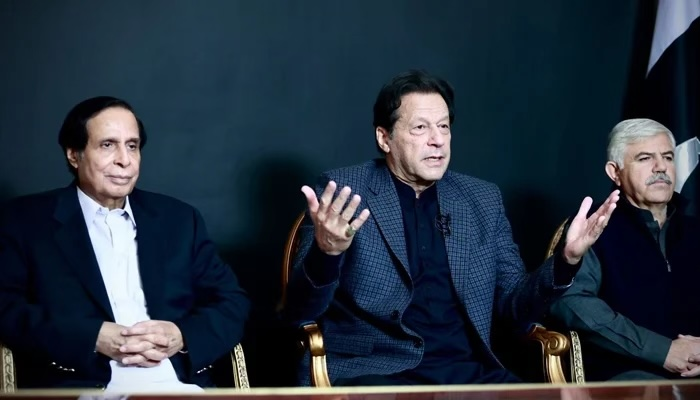
Chaudhry Parvez Elahi (left) announcing the dissolution of the Punjab Assembly alongside Imran Khan.

On 16 April, during a bitterly contested session of the Provincial Assembly, Hamza Shehbaz was elected as Chief Minister with the support of 197 MPAs, 25 of which belonged to PTI. This, however, violated Article 63-A of the Pakistani constitution, which explicitly states that if a MPA or MNA "votes contrary to any direction issued by the Parliamentary Party to which he belongs", they must be disqualified from office.

The election of Hamza Shehbaz, which was heavily disputed, led to a long dispute between President Arif Alvi and newly-elected Prime Minister Shehbaz Sharif, (Hamza Shehbaz's father who had become PM on April 11 after successfully defeating Imran Khan a day earlier in the aforementioned no-confidence vote). Alvi was of the view that Hamza's election was invalid due to the use of PTI votes used to pass the majority line; as such, he refused to remove Governor Omar Sarfaraz Cheema at the request of Shehbaz Sharif - Cheema was adamantly refusing to administer the oath to Hamza Shehbaz. After litigation, the Lahore High Court ordered National Assembly Speaker Raja Pervez Ashraf to administer the oath instead.

Questions regarding the validity of Hamza Shehbaz's election on April 16 continued to be argued in court. On May 17, the Supreme Court of Pakistan announced its opinion that a dissenting lawmaker's vote against their own party cannot be counted - if applied to the CM election in Punjab, this opinion would render Hamza Shehbaz's election invalid since he would only have garnered 172 votes without the dissenters from PTI, whereas 186 are required for a majority. On May 20, these MPAs were de-seated by the Election Commission of Pakistan; 5 of these seats were reserved for women or minorities and as such were filled by other PTI members, by-elections were ordered on the 20 constituency-based seats.

== By-elections and July CM election ==
The crisis grew further out of control after these by-elections were held. On July 17, PTI won 15 of the seats up for contest and thus the PTI-PMLQ alliance had the numerical majority in the Assembly, and was thus expected to win the election for Chief Minister on July 22 that was ordered by the Supreme Court earlier.

On the day of voting, Elahi appeared to win with 186 votes against 179 of Hamza Shehbaz; however, Deputy Speaker Dost Muhammad Mazari rejected 10 of the votes from PMLQ due to a letter from party President Shujaat Hussain which ordered PMLQ to vote for Hamza Shehbaz - Mazari argued that the Supreme Court ruling of May 17 meant that the votes for Elahi from PMLQ were thus not to be counted. As a result of this, Hamza Shehbaz was declared the winner of the contest once again, having achieved 3 votes more than Elahi after the ruling. This ruling was strongly disputed by PTI and the parliamentary party of PMLQ, who argued that Shujaat's letter had no relevance to the election since Shujaat was not leader of the parliamentary party which is mentioned in the Constitution.

On July 26, after 2 days of hearings, the Supreme Court ruled against Mazari's ruling and declared Elahi the legal CM. Elahi was administered the oath of office by President Alvi in the early hours of July 27.

== See also ==
- 2022–2023 Pakistan political unrest
- 2025 political crisis in Khyber Pakhtunkhwa
