= Provincial Assembly of Punjab =

Unicameral legislature of Punjab, Pakistan

Provincial Assembly of Punjab صوبائی اسمبلی پنجاب Sūbā'ī Asamblī Panjāb
- List of members of the 18th Provincial Assembly of the Punjab

Type
- Type: Unicameral

Leadership
- Speaker: Malik Ahmad Khan, PMLN since 24 February 2024
- Deputy Speaker: Zaheer Iqbal Channar, PMLN since 24 February 2024
- Chief Minister: Maryam Nawaz, PML(N) since 26 February 2024
- Leader of the Opposition: Muhammad Moeen Ud Din Riaz, IND since 2 October 2025

Structure
- Seats: 365
- Political groups: Government (264): PML-N (229); PPP (16); PML-Q (11); IPP (7); PML-Z (1); Opposition (101): SIC (75); PTI (24); TLP (1); MWM (1)

Elections
- Voting system: Mixed member majoritarian: 297 members elected by FPTP; 66 seats for women, 8 seats for non-Muslims through PR
- Last election: 8 February 2024
- Next election: 2029

Meeting place
- Provincial Assembly of the Punjab, Lahore

Website
- www.pap.gov.pk

Constitution
- Constitution of the Islamic Republic of Pakistan

The Provincial Assembly of Punjab, also known as the Punjab Assembly, is the supreme legislative body of Punjab, a province of Pakistan. It convenes at the Assembly Building in Lahore, the capital of Punjab.

It is a unicameral legislature of elected representatives; and was established under Article 106 of the Constitution of Pakistan, having a total of 371 seats, with 297 general seats, 66 seats reserved for women and 8 reserved for non-Muslims.

== Assembly building ==
The two-story Assembly Chamber, residential hostels, and expansive lawns cover 65,000 square metres (16 acres) on the Shahrah-e-Quaid-Azam (The Mall). After it was completed in 1935, the Assembly Chamber housed the Assembly for the Punjab province. After the division of Punjab and the emergence of Pakistan, the building became the administrative center of Pakistani Punjab.

=== New Assembly Building ===
The new Assembly Hall is constructed positioned between the old and the new Assembly buildings. It has a capacity of 500 seats in the main hall and 600 seats in the galleries for the visitors and 300 seats in the press gallery for media personals covering the proceedings of the House. There would be a th a capacity of 400 are also included the new building. Also, the new offices of the CM, Speaker, Deputy Speaker, ministers, and Leader of the Opposition in the assembly were set up in the Secretariat building of the new building. It was inaugurated on 2 January 2023.

=== Old Assembly Chamber ===
Designed by Bazel M. Salune, chief architect of the Architecture Circle of Punjab, the foundation stone of the Assembly Chamber was laid by Sir Jogindar Singh, Minister of Agriculture, on 17 November 1935 during the British Raj. The construction was completed in 1938.

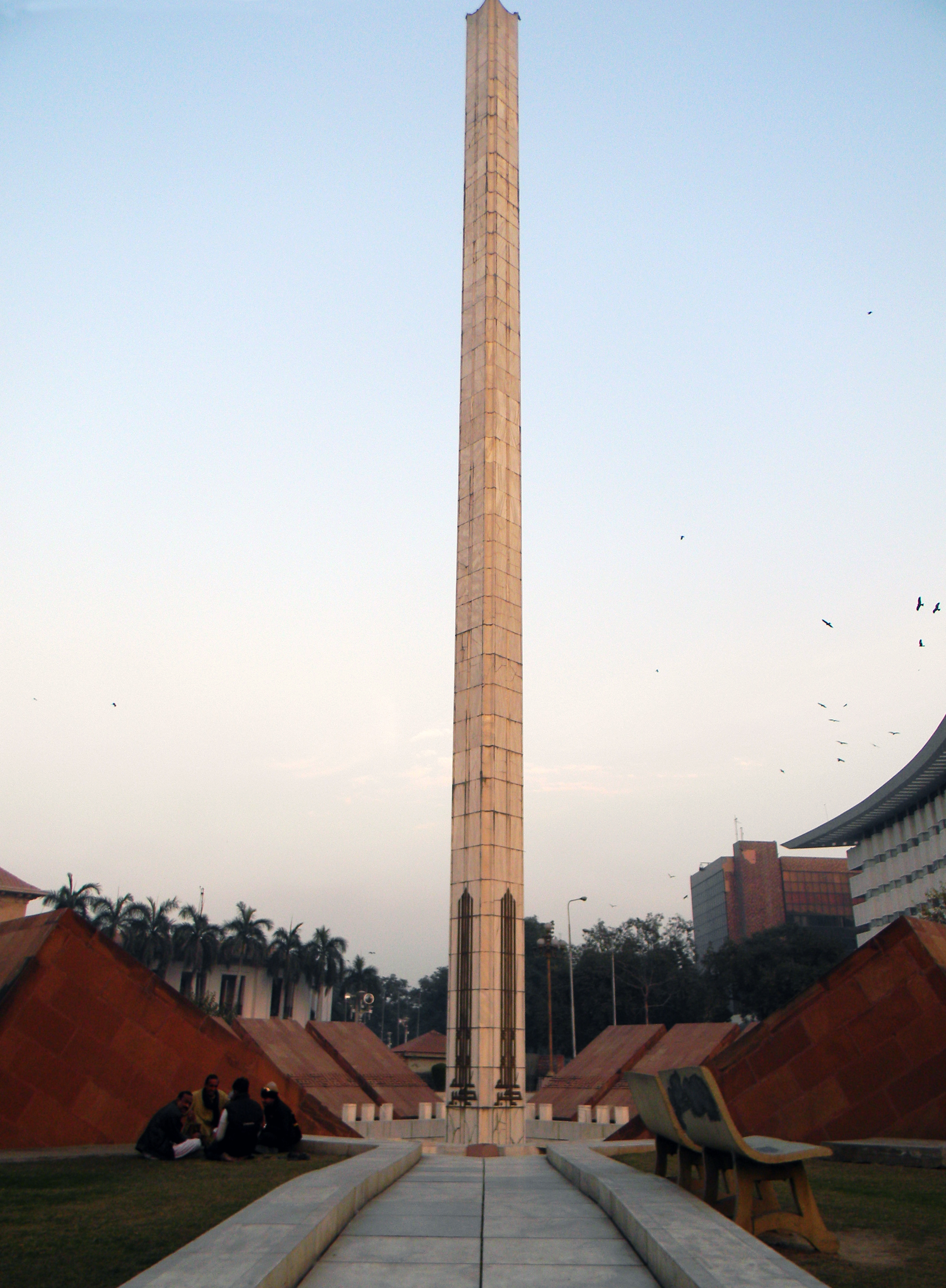
The Islamic Summit Minar in front of the assembly building

The first floor houses the Assembly Hall, which combines Indian and Roman architecture. Originally designed for a small number of members, it now accommodates 371 members. The hall is fitted with a public address system and a closed-circuit television system. There was gallery seating for 200 visitors to view the proceedings of the Assembly, but now most of the gallery has been designated as floor of the house to accommodate the increased number of members, and accommodations for radio and TV press. The rest of the first floor consists of the Speaker's Chamber, the Chief Minister's Chamber, the Deputy Speaker's Office, the Cabinet Room, the Ministers' Offices, two committee rooms, and the Assembly Secretariat offices.

The ground floor includes a reception area, a cafeteria, a library, a prayer room, a dispensary, the office of the leader of the opposition, the bank, the Assembly Secretariat offices, and one Committee room.

=== Pipal's House ===
The members' first residential hostel, called Pipal's House, was built in 1950. It is situated near the Punjab Civil Secretariat, and contains 40 units. Two-story blocks form 3 sides of a common garden, with 6 units in each story. A fourth block houses the remaining four units.

Each residential unit consists of a large bed-sitting room, a dressing room and a bathroom. Some units have a kitchen and a veranda. There is a corridor in front of all rooms serving as a passage.

=== Additional housing ===
In 1988, a project was formed to provide additional housing for Assembly members. Nayyar Ali Dada was appointed a consultant by the Chief Minister of Punjab, who was responsible for the project. Composed of blocks A and B, the construction was planned for the western lawn of the Assembly building. Block A was designed as a semicircular building, and Block B as a rectangular building. Block A, divided into phases I and II, was originally intended to contain 108 suites.

Construction of phase I of Block A began in 1988, when the foundation stone was laid down by the Chief Minister Nawaz Sharif. This phase was completed in 1992 and the inauguration ceremony was presided over by Manzoor Wattoo, Speaker of the Assembly. It consists of a basement, a ground floor, and four residential floors. The ground floor includes a reception area and a lounge for visitors, as well service areas. The four residential floors consist of a total of 36 suites, with nine suites per floor. Each suite consists of one bedroom with an attached bathroom and a kitchen.

The Phase II plan originally called for 72 residential units, but was later revised to include 40 residential suites each consisting of a lounge, a bedroom, an office, a kitchen, and two bathrooms. One bathroom is connected to the lounge and the other to the bedroom.

== Constitution ==
Article 106 of the constitution provides that each Provincial Assembly shall consist of general seats and seats reserved only for women and non Muslims. The same article specifies that the Provincial Assembly of Punjab will have a total of 371 seats: 297 general seats, 66 reserved for women, and eight reserved for non-Muslims.

- A seat reserved for Women:
  - Constituency W-317
  - Constituency W-328
  - Constituency W-337
  - Constituency W-352
  - Constituency W-362

=== Qualification of members ===
According to Article 113 of the Constitution, the qualifications for membership in the National Assembly set forth in Article 62 of the Constitution also apply for membership to the Provincial Assembly. Thus, a member of the Provincial Assembly:

1. must be a citizen of Pakistan;
2. must be at least twenty-five years of age and must be enrolled as a voter in any electoral roll in–
  1. any part of Pakistan, for election to a general seat or a seat reserved for non-Muslims; and
  2. any area in a Province from which the member seeks membership for election to a seat reserved for women.
3. must be of good character and not commonly known as one who violates Islamic injunctions;
4. must have adequate knowledge of Islamic teachings and practices obligatory duties prescribed by Islam as well as abstains from major sins;
5. must be sagacious, righteous, non-profligate, and honest;
6. must have never been convicted for a crime involving moral turpitude or for giving false evidence;
7. must have never, after the establishment of Pakistan, worked against the integrity of the country or opposed the ideology of Pakistan.

The disqualifications specified in paragraphs 3 and 4 do not apply to a person who is a non-Muslim, but such a person must have good moral reputation and possess other qualifications prescribed by an act of Parliament.

=== Disqualification of members ===
The criteria for disqualification of members of a Provincial Assembly is established by Articles 63, 63A, 113 and 127. A person shall be disqualified from being elected or chosen as, and from being, a member of the Provincial Assembly if the member:

1. is of unsound mind and has been so declared by a competent court; or
2. is an undischarged insolvent; or
3. ceases to be a citizen of Pakistan, or acquires the citizenship of a foreign state; or
4. holds an office of profit in the service of Pakistan other than an office declared by law not to disqualify its holder; or
5. is in the service of any statutory body of any body which is owned or controlled by the Government or in which the Government has a controlling share or interest; or
6. is propagating any opinion, or acting in any manner, prejudicial to the Ideology of Pakistan, or the sovereignty, integrity or security of Pakistan, or morality, or the maintenance of public order, or the integrity or independence of the judiciary of Pakistan, or which defames or brings into ridicule the judiciary or the Armed Forces of Pakistan; or
7. has been convicted by a court of competent jurisdiction on a charge of corrupt practice, moral turpitude or misuse of power or authority under any law for the time being in force; or
8. he has been dismissed from the service of Pakistan or service of a corporation or office set up or controlled by the Provincial Government or a Local Government on the grounds of misconduct or moral turpitude; or
9. has been removed or compulsorily retired from the service of Pakistan or service of a corporation or office set up or controlled by the Provincial Government or a Local Government on the grounds of misconduct or moral turpitude; or
10. has been in the service of Pakistan or of any statutory body or any body which is owned or controlled by the Government or in which the Government has a controlling share or interest, unless a period of two years has elapsed since he ceased to be in such service; or
11. is found guilty of a corrupt or illegal practice under any law for the time being in force, unless a period of five years has elapsed from the date on which that order takes effect; or
12. has been convicted under section 7 of the Political Parties Act, 1962 (III of 1962), unless a period of five years has elapsed from the date of such conviction; or
13. whether by himself or by any person or body of persons in trust for him or for his benefit or on his account or as a member of a Hindu undivided family, has any share or interest in a contract, not being a contract between a cooperative society and Government, for the supply of goods to, or for the execution of any contract or for the performance of any service undertaken by, Government.

Article 63A, which deals with disqualification on grounds of defection, was added to the Constitution in 1997. A member of a Parliamentary Party composed of a single political party defects if the member:

1. resigns from membership of the political party or joins another Parliamentary Party; or
2. votes or abstains from voting in the Provincial Assembly contrary to any direction issued by the Parliamentary Party to which the member belongs, in relations to
  1. election of the Chief Minister; or
  2. a vote of confidence or a vote of no-confidence; or
  3. a Money Bill.

=== Privileges of members ===
Article 66 read with Article 127 confers freedom of speech on the members of the Provincial Assembly. No member is liable to any proceedings in any court of law in respect of anything said or any vote given by him in Assembly. Similarly no member is liable in respect of any publication which is published under the authority of Provincial Assembly.

However, Article 114 of the Constitution curtails this privilege and prohibits members from discussing conduct of judges of High Court and Supreme Court in the discharge of their duties.

=== First day proceedings in the Provincial Assembly ===
(a) Oath of Members. –

After general elections, elected members in the first meeting take oath in the form set out in Third Schedule of the Constitution. Article 65 read with Article 127 states "A person elected to a House shall not sit or vote until he has made before the House oath in the form set out in the Third Schedule". Those members who have not taken oath in the first meeting take oath when they attend a meeting for the first time. The first meeting is presided by the outgoing Speaker. Article 53 (8) read with Article 127 says "the Speaker shall continue in his office till the person elected to fill the office by next Assembly enters upon his office." (b) Election and oath of Speaker and Deputy Speaker. – In addition to oath taking by the members, Provincial Assembly according to Article 108 to the exclusion of any other business, elect from among its members a Speaker and a Deputy Speaker. When office of Speaker or Deputy Speaker becomes vacant, in any way, the Assembly elects another member as Speaker or Deputy Speaker.

The elected Speaker and Deputy Speaker according to clause 2 of Article 53 read with Article 127 take oath before the House in the form set out in the Third Schedule.

=== Summoning and prorogation of Provincial Assemblies ===
Article 109 authorizes the Governor of the Province to summon Provincial Assembly to meet at such time and place as he thinks fit. Where the Governor summons Assembly he is authorized to prorogue it too. In addition, the Speaker, on a requisition signed by not less than one-fourth of the total membership of the Provincial Assembly, can summon it, at such time and place as he thinks fit, within fourteen days of the receipt of the requisition. Article 54(3) read with Article 127 also empowers the Speaker to prorogue the session where he summons it.

=== Number of sessions and days during a year ===
Article 54 (2) and (3) read with article 127 say there are at least three sessions of Provincial Assembly every year, with not more than 120 days intervening between the last sitting of the Assembly in one session and the date appointed for its first sitting in the next session. While clause 'g' of Article 127 read with Proviso to Article 54 provides that Provincial Assembly shall meet for not less than 100 working days in each year.

=== Duration of Provincial Assembly ===
The term of Provincial Assembly in Pakistan according to Article 107 is five years unless it is sooner dissolved, from the day of its first meeting and stands dissolved at the expiration of its terms.

=== Other methods of dissolution of Provincial Assembly ===
(a) Dissolution of Provincial Assembly on the advice by the Chief Minister. – Under Article 112, clause 1, the Governor of a Province is empowered to dissolve Provincial Assembly if so advised by the Chief Minister. Where the Chief Minister so advises, the Provincial Assembly stands dissolved at the expiration of 48 hours. (b) Dissolution of Provincial Assembly by the Governor on the approval by the President. – Clause 2 of the same Article again empowers the Governor to dissolve Provincial Assembly subject to the approval of the President, where he is of the opinion, that after having been passed a vote of no confidence against the Chief Minister, there is no other member of the Provincial Assembly to command the confidence of the majority of the members of the Provincial Assembly, in a session of the Provincial Assembly summoned for the purpose.

=== Executive Authority of a province ===
Executive Authority is exercised by the Governor and under Article 105, he shall act in accordance with advice of the cabinet or the Chief Minister.

=== Appointment and ascertainment of Chief Minister ===
According to clause 2-A of Article 130, the Governor of a Province invites the member of the Provincial Assembly to be the Chief Minister who commands the confidence of the majority of the members of the Provincial Assembly as ascertained in the session of the Assembly summoned for the purpose in accordance with the provisions of the constitution.

=== Powers and functions of Provincial Assembly ===
There are three major functions or powers of a Provincial Assembly:

1. To make laws (Article 141 and 142 of the Constitution of Pakistan)
2. To manage the purse of the nation (Article 123 (3))
3. To keep checks on the policies and practices of the Government (Article 130)

=== Limitations ===
One of the major functions of the Provincial Assembly is to make laws as provided in Article 141 of the Constitution for conferring of functions upon officers or authorities subordinate to the Provincial Governments, Constitutionally. This function is subject to some limitations.

1. Under Article 142, a Provincial Assembly cannot legislate when an emergency is declared in the country.
2. A Provincial Assembly cannot make law which is against fundamental rights.
3. Principles of policy or rule of law should be the base of each law.
4. A law cannot be enacted if it is not in conformity with the injunctions of Islam.

=== Federal Legislative List and Concurrent Legislative List ===
By virtue of Article 142, the Provincial Assembly cannot legislate on matters which do not fall within its purview. However, under the same article, the Provincial Assembly can legislate on matters mentioned in Concurrent Legislative List. But where parliament makes a law in Concurrent Legislative List, and Provincial Assembly also legislates on it, the Provincial law will be void to the extent that it conflicts with the Federal law.

=== Residuary List ===
The Provincial Assembly has exclusive powers to make law with respect to any matter not enumerated either in the Federal Legislative List or in the Concurrent Legislative List. Such list is called a Residuary List. Residuary matters are exclusively within Provincial autonomy. From the above, it cannot be extracted that the Province is subordinate to the Federation or Federation is subordinate to Province. In fact, legislative powers are distributed between Federation and Provinces vide Article 142. And one institution cannot take over powers of other institution. However, this provincial law making power comes to an end and shifts to the Federation during emergency when declared vide Articles 232, 233 or 234.

== List of Assemblies ==
Order	Terms
First Assembly	1947–1949
Second Assembly	1951–1955
Third Assembly (Provincial Assembly of West Pakistan)	1956
Fourth Assembly (Provincial Assembly of West Pakistan)	1956–1958
Fifth Assembly (Provincial Assembly of West Pakistan)	1962–1965
Sixth Assembly (Provincial Assembly of West Pakistan)	1965–1969
Seventh Assembly	1972–1977
Eighth Assembly	1977
Ninth Assembly	1985–1988
Tenth Assembly	1988–1990
Eleventh Assembly	1990–1993
Twelfth Assembly	1993–1996
Thirteenth Assembly	1996–1999
Fourteenth Assembly	2002–2007
Fifteenth Assembly	2008–2013
Sixteenth Assembly	2013–2018
Seventeenth Assembly	2018–2023
Eighteenth Assembly	2024–present

== Manager of purse of a nation ==
The second important function of Provincial Assembly under Article 123 (3) is that it acts as a manager or custodian of the purse of a nation.

== Provincial Consolidated Fund ==
No expenditure from the Provincial Consolidated Fund is deemed to be duly authorized unless it is specified in the schedule so authenticated and is laid before the Provincial Assembly. Provincial Assembly exercises checks over executive through control over the Finance. Article 119 provides custody and withdrawal of money from Provincial Consolidated Fund, (defined in Article 118) and public accounts of a Province, unless it is regulated by the Act of the Provincial Assembly.

=== Annual and supplementary Budget statement ===
Provisions given under Article 120 dealing with annual budget statement and Article 124 dealing with supplementary budget or excess grant become effective, when it is approved by the Provincial Assembly.

=== Approval of budgets ===
Article 122_II and Article 124 authorize Provincial Assembly to approve or refuse any demand and reduce the amount specified in the demand. Once budget is approved, the Government has no right to deviate from these sanctions. For excess expenditure, Government has to seek regularization from the Assembly. Similarly under Article 88 read with Article 127, accounts and audit reports of the Government are further scrutinized by the public accounts Committee of the Assembly.

=== To keep checks on the policies and practices of the Government ===
The significance of Provincial Assembly is that it is a representative institution and keeps checks upon policies, practices and performance of the Government. Article 130 (4) says that the Cabinet shall be collectively responsible to the Provincial Assembly.

== Devices of accountability ==
Issues relating to Public interest are raised by the Members for discussion in the House in the form of questions, adjournment motions, call attention notices, general discussion, resolutions and various Reports.

The Members make the Executive accountable to the legislature through these devices according to the Rules of Procedure of the Provincial Assembly of the Punjab, 1997.

== Members Support Program ==
This program is meant to serve Members of the Provincial Assembly in different areas. They are provided legislative help in drafting private members bills. They are provided useful and informative books. An Internet facility is also available to them, and through Internet research they can polish their ideas.

To provide these facilities to the Members, in 1997 the Research and Reference Division was formed. It was established to provide information to the Members when needed, and to collect up-to-date information from the resources available. The Library and Computer Sections were included in this division. It was also meant to provide help to the representatives in legislative procedures, such as the drafting of a bill. Prior to the establishment of the Research and Reference Wing, this service was performed by the Legislation Branch.

== Automation Section and Library Section ==
The primary function of Library Section is to provide data to the Members and to the Research Section. Information such as the Assembly's agenda, date of next sitting, schedule of committee meetings and information about Members is available due to installation of the latest PBX. The Assembly Secretariat has stored vital information in the computer and it is accessible from anywhere around the clock.

Moreover, Research and Reference Division has designed a web page to provide information to the Members about the Assembly Secretariat and proceedings of the Assembly including its schedule and agenda, and a summary of its proceedings. This web page also includes the procedural rules for the Provincial Assembly of the Punjab and some other important laws of the country.

== 2022 Constitutional Crisis of Pakistan ==
A political and constitutional crisis emerged in Pakistan when, on 3 April 2022, National Assembly Deputy Speaker Qasim Khan Suri dismissed a no-confidence motion against Prime Minister Imran Khan during a session in which it was expected to be taken up for a vote, alleging that a foreign country's involvement in the regime change (which was not proved in the Supreme Court, Khan's opposition declared it a political move by Khan) was contradictory to Article 5 of the Constitution of Pakistan. Meanwhile in the Punjab province, 25 members of the PTI defected and joined the opposition, that assured them a clear majority hence a no-confidence motion was filed in the assembly against Khan's CM Usman Buzdar. The Speaker of Punjab Assembly and the parliamentary leader of PML (Q) in Punjab, Parvez Elahi was in a coalition with PTI following 2018 General Election and he had 10 seats in the assembly. He demanded that he would only support Khan on the federal as well as provincial level, if he nominated Elahi as his CM. Khan agreed and the no-confidence passed which removed Buzdar from Power and later Hamza Shahbaz from PML (N) was elected with the support of PTI's dissidents. Following the ouster of Imran Khan, his party (PTI) Pakistan Tehreek-i-Insaaf filed a reference for a comprehensive explanation of the Article 63-A of the Constitution of Pakistan. The 5 member bench of the Supreme Court decided with a 3-2 split decision to not allow lawmakers to vote against party line in four instances outlined under Article 63-A.

Based on the ruling, 25 MPAs were de-seated and Hamza Shahbaz was ordered to continue performing his duties, but as a trustee Chief Minister, with limited powers, while by-elections take place all over Punjab for the fulfillment of the vacant seats, followed by a runoff vote for the office of Chief Minister of Punjab.

The 2022 Punjab by-elections proved to be a major victory for Pakistan Tehreek-i-Insaaf, which won 15 seats out of 20, whereas PML(N) only managed to grab 4 seats and an independent candidate emerged victorious on one. PTI's victory changed the parliamentary standings, as, they soon formed a coalition with the PML(Q) which already had 10 seats in the parliament. This gave PTI a clear majority of 188 seats. However, once the voting took place on 22 July, the leader of the PML(Q), and former Prime Minister Shujaat Hussain wrote a letter to the deputy speaker Dost Mazari, expressing that he has guided his party members to vote in favor of Hamza Shahbaz. The deputy speaker consequently rejected the 10 votes cast by the PML(Q) members in support of Parvez Elahi under Article 63-A of the Constitution of Pakistan. This gave Hamza Shahbaz the upper hand as he received 179 votes to the PTI's 176 and consequently became the Chief Minister of Punjab.

The Supreme Court held a hearing on a case on whether the Deputy Speaker's ruling was legal according to the Constitution of Pakistan. As a consequence of the hearing, Hamza Shahbaz was made a "trustee Chief Minister" for the time being. While Parvez Elahi was the parliamentary leader in the province and Shujaat Hussain was the leader of the party itself, the Supreme Court eventually ruled in favour of Parvez Elahi and the SC's final verdict read that the Parliamentary Leader has the authority in this case, as a result Elahi became the Chief Minister of Punjab. His oath was administered by President Arif Alvi on 27 July, after the Governor of Punjab, Balighur Rehman, refused to do so.

"The vote of any member of a parliamentary party in a house that is cast contrary to any direction issued by the latter in terms of para (b) of clause (1) of Article 63-A cannot be counted and must be disregarded, and this is so regardless of whether the party head, subsequent to such vote, proceeds to take, or refrains from taking, action that would result in a declaration of defection." - Article 63-A of the Constitution of Pakistan.

== See also ==
- Punjab, Pakistan
- Government of Punjab
- Governor of Punjab
- Chief Minister of Punjab
- Senior Minister of Punjab
- Speaker of the Provincial Assembly of Punjab
- Leader of the Opposition of Punjab
- Chief Secretary Punjab
- Provincial Assembly of the Punjab crisis
- Provincial Assembly of Sindh
- Provincial Assembly of Khyber Pakhtunkhwa
- Provincial Assembly of Balochistan
- Constitution of the Islamic Republic of Pakistan
