= NA-117 Lahore-I =

Constituency of the National Assembly of Pakistan

- Constituency for the National Assembly of Pakistan
- Region: Lahore City area of Lahore District
- Electorate: 520,453

Current constituency
- Party: Istehkam-e-Pakistan Party
- Member: Aleem Khan
- Created from: NA-118 Lahore-I

NA-117 Lahore-I ( این اے-117، لاہور-1) is a constituency for the National Assembly of Pakistan.

== Area ==
The area includes some of the oldest parts of Lahore, behind the walled city including areas like Matchus Factory, Saeed Park, Qaiser Town, Kot Shahabud Din, Yousuf Park, Wandala Road, Lajpat Road, Jia Musa, Qila Muhammadi, Kot Begum, Sabzi Mandi, Ravi Road, Saggian, and Shahdara.

== Members of Parliament ==
=== 2018–2023: NA-123 Lahore-I ===
Election	Member	Party
2018	Muhammad Riaz Malik	PML (N)

=== 2024–present: NA-117 Lahore-I ===
Election	Member	Party
2024	Aleem Khan	IPP

== Election 2002 ==
General elections were held on 10 October 2002. Salman Butt an independent candidate won by 25,484 votes.

General election 2002: NA-118 Lahore-I
Party	Candidate	Votes	%	±%
Independent	Salman Butt	25,484	36.47	
PML(Q)	Mian Muhammad Azhar	21,641	30.97	
PPP	Ch. Abdul Qadir	16,855	24.12	
MMA	Abdul Wadood Shahid	2,728	3.90	
PAT	Iqbal Mehmood Awan	1,782	2.55	
Others	Others (four candidates)	1,389	1.99	
Turnout		71,206	29.22	
Total valid votes		69,879	98.14	
Rejected ballots		1,327	1.86	
Majority		3,843	5.50	
Registered electors		243,707		

== Election 2008 ==
General elections were held on 18 February 2008.

General election 2008: NA-118 Lahore-I
Party	Candidate	Votes	%	±%
PML(N)	Muhammad Riaz Malik	55,900	60.18	
PPP	Syed Asif Hashmi	24,712	26.60	
PML(Q)	Mian Muhammad Azhar	11,075	11.92	
Others	Others (nine candidates)	1,175	1.30	
Turnout		94,620	37.72	
Total valid votes		92,862	98.14	
Rejected ballots		1,758	1.86	
Majority		31,188	33.58	
Registered electors		250,850		
PML(N) gain from Independent				

== Election 2013 ==
General elections were held on 11 May 2013.

General election 2013: NA-118 Lahore-I
Party	Candidate	Votes	%	±%
PML(N)	Muhammad Riaz Malik	103,346	62.23	
PTI	Hamid Zaman	43,616	26.26	
PPP	Faraz Hashmi	14,054	8.46	
Others	Others (eighteen candidates)	5,068	3.05	
Turnout		169,255	50.64	
Total valid votes		166,084	98.13	
Rejected ballots		3,171	1.87	
Majority		59,730	35.97	
Registered electors		334,256		
PML(N) hold				

== Election 2018 ==
General elections were held on 25 July 2018.

General election 2018: NA-123 Lahore-I
Party	Candidate	Votes	%	±%
PML(N)	Muhammad Riaz Malik	97,193	47.67	
PTI	Mehar Wajid Azeem	72,535	35.58	
Others	Others (eleven candidates)	34,143	16.75	
Turnout		207,374	51.13	
Total valid votes		203,871	98.31	
Rejected ballots		3,503	1.69	
Majority		24,658	12.09	
Registered electors		405,583		
PML(N) hold		Swing	N/A	

Other contestant parties and candidate as Tehreek-e-Labbaik Pakistan won 23,962, and Independent candidate Faraz Hashmi won 971 votes, Wahid Ahmad won 414 votes, Zaman Ali won 290 votes, Amjad khan won 123 votes, and Humayun Akhtar khan won 70 votes.

== Election 2024 ==
General elections were held on 8 February 2024. Aleem Khan won the election with 91,490 votes.

General election 2024: NA-117 Lahore-I
Party	Candidate	Votes	%	±%
IPP	Aleem Khan	91,490	40.05	
PTI	Ali Ijaz (Note: Filed nomination papers as PTI candidate but ECP allowed him to run as an independent)	80,854	35.40	▼0.18
TLP	Saif Ur Rehman	38,162	16.71	▲4.96
Others	Others (seventeen candidates)	17,914	7.84	
Turnout		234,062	44.97	▼6.16
Total valid votes		228,420	97.59	
Rejected ballots		5,642	2.41	
Majority		10,636	4.66	
Registered electors		520,453		
IPP gain from PTI				

== See also ==
- NA-116 Sheikhupura-IV
- NA-118 Lahore-II
