= Governor of Punjab, Pakistan =

Head of province of Punjab, Pakistan

Governor of Punjab
- گورنر پنجاب; Gavarnar Panjāb
- Emblem of Punjab

- Flag of Punjab

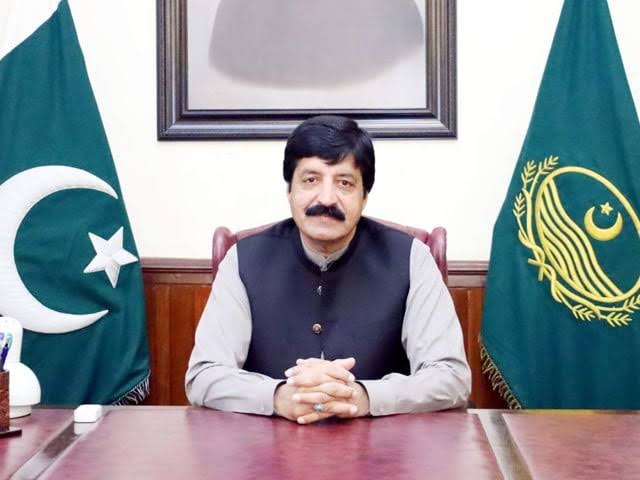
- Incumbent; Sardar Saleem Haider Khan since 10 May 2024
- Executive branch of the Government of Punjab
- Style: The Honorable (formal)
- Type: Head of province
- Status: Ceremonial officeholder; Chancellor of public universities in Punjab
- Reports to: President of Pakistan
- Residence: Governor's House
- Seat: Lahore
- Nominator: Prime Minister of Pakistan
- Appointer: President of Pakistan
- Term length: *At the pleasure of the President of Pakistan; No term limits specified
- Constituting instrument: Article 101, Constitution of Pakistan
- Precursor: Governor of British Punjab
- Inaugural holder: Sir Francis Mudie
- Formation: 15 August 1947; 79 years ago
- Website: governorhouse.punjab.gov.pk

The governor of Punjab (Punjabi/Urdu: گورنر پنجاب, romanised: Gavarnar Panjāb) is the head of province of the Pakistani province of Punjab. Appointed by the federal government through the president of Pakistan, the governor serves a nominal and ceremonial role as head of province and executive, with real executive authority exercised by the elected chief minister and their appointed cabinet; and administrative authority by the chief secretary, the senior-most bureaucrat in the province, who reports to the chief minister.

However, throughout the history of Pakistan, the powers of the provincial governors were vastly increased, when the provincial assemblies were dissolved and the administrative role came under direct control of the governors, as in the cases of martial laws of 1958–1972 and 1977–1985, and governor rules of 1999–2002. In the case of Punjab, there was direct governor rule in 1949–1951, when the provincial chief minister of that time was removed and assemblies dissolved.

== Powers of Governor ==
Executive Powers related to appointment, removal, oath taking etc.

Legislative powers related to provincial assembly of Punjab.

Judicial powers related to Lahore High Court or judiciary.

== Executive Powers ==
Governor is ceremonial and appointed head of Province. He is appointed by President on advice of Prime Minister of Pakistan. All executive powers are exercised by Chief Minister and cabinet on his behalf. He is bound to act on the advice of the Chief Minister and cabinet. He serves until removed by the President on the advice of Prime Minister.

Governor is chancellor of public sector universities in Punjab. As chancellor, he appoints Vice Chancellors of public sector universities. He can take action against employees of universities for any unlawful acts.

He appoints provincial ministers on advice of Chief Minister amongst members of provincial assembly of Punjab.

He appoints caretaker chief minister after consultation with Chief Minister and Leader of Opposition.

He appoints caretaker cabinet on advice of caretaker chief minister.

This is a constitutional obligation of the provincial government to keep him informed on all matters of provincial administration and legislative proposals brought before provincial assembly.

He has constitutional authority to invite chief minister to obtain vote of confidence from majority members of provincial assembly. If he fails he can remove him from post of chief minister. He can exercise this power only when he is satisfied that chief minister has lost confidence of members of provincial assembly.

He appoints Advocate General of Punjab on advice of Chief Minister.

He appoints chairman of Punjab Public Service Commission on advice of Chief Minister.

He can exercise executive powers directly without advice of the chief minister but during governor rule. Governor rule is imposed by President on advice of Prime Minister in emergency situations i.e. financial emergency, constitutional breakdown and when there is threat of war and external aggression.

He take oath from elected and caretaker chief minister and members of cabinet

== Legislative Powers ==
All bills passed by provincial assembly of Punjab becomes acts only when assented by Governor or deemed to be assented after passage of certain time according to constitution.

Governor can refuse to sign the bills if he thinks that there is any issue or a bill is not according to constitutional provisions. If the bill is again passed by the provincial assembly with or without amendment, the governor is bound to assent the bill. If he again refuses to sign the bill, it automatically becomes act after passage of certain time, according to the constitution.

The governor can dissolve provincial assembly on advice of chief minister. He can refuse to dissolve the assembly but after 48 hours assembly will be automatically dissolved.

He can also dissolve the provincial assembly in his discretion when no confidence motion against chief minister is successfully passed and no other member of provincial assembly is able to elected as chief minister.

Finance Act which is also passed by provincial assembly is assented by Governor. He can not refuse to sign it because it is money bill.

He has constitutional authority to announce date of general election after dissolution of provincial assembly not later than 90 days.

He can promulgate ordinances when he is satisfies that assembly is not in session on advice of Chief Minister and cabinet.

The reports of auditor general shall be submitted to the governor who shall cause them to be laid to provincial assembly.

== Judicial Powers ==
Chief Justice of Lahore High Court take oath before Governor.

Lahore High Court may have Benches at such other places determined by Governor on advice of cabinet and in consultation with chief justice of Lahore High Court.

The Governor in consultation with the Chief Justice of the Lahore High Court to make rules to provide the following matters, that is to

say,—

(a) assigning the area in relation to which each Bench shall have

exercise jurisdiction vested in the High Court; and

(b) for all incidental, supplemental or consequential matters.

== List of governors of Punjab ==
Following is a list of the governors of Punjab since the establishment of Pakistan in 1947.

Muslim League Pakistan Peoples Party Islami Jamhoori Ittehad Pakistan Muslim League (N) Pakistan Tehreek-e-Insaf Independent, civil or military administration Office abolished

Tenure no.	Governor		Political affiliation	Term of office		
Tenure no.	Portrait	Name	Political affiliation	Took office	Left office	Time in office
1		Sir Francis Mudie	Independent	August 15, 1947	August 2, 1949	1 year, 352 days
2	Portrait of Abdur Rab Nishtar	Abdur Rab Nishtar	Muslim League	August 2, 1949	November 24, 1951	2 years, 114 days
3	Portrait of I. I. Chundrigar	I. I. Chundrigar	Muslim League	November 24, 1951	May 2, 1953	1 year, 159 days
4		Mian Aminuddin	Independent	May 2, 1953	June 24, 1954	1 year, 53 days
5		Habib Rahimtoola	Muslim League	June 24, 1954	November 26, 1954	155 days
6	Portrait of Mushtaq Ahmed Gurmani	Mushtaq Ahmed Gurmani	Muslim League	November 26, 1954	October 14, 1955	322 days
–	Office abolished Punjab became part of the province of West Pakistan			October 14, 1955	June 30, 1970	14 years, 259 days
7		Lieutenant-General Attiqur Rahman	Military administration (Pakistan Army)	July 1, 1970	December 23, 1971	1 year, 175 days
8		Ghulam Mustafa Khar (first tenure)	PPP	December 23, 1971	November 12, 1973	1 year, 324 days
9		Sadiq Hussain Qureshi	PPP	November 12, 1973	March 14, 1975	1 year, 122 days
10		Ghulam Mustafa Khar (second tenure)	PPP	March 14, 1975	July 31, 1975	139 days
11	Portrait of Mohammad Abbas Abbasi	Mohammad Abbas Abbasi	PPP	July 31, 1975	July 5, 1977	1 year, 339 days
12		Aslam Riaz Hussain	Civil administration	July 5, 1977	September 18, 1978	1 year, 75 days
13		Lieutenant-General Sawar Khan	Military administration (Pakistan Army)	September 18, 1978	May 1, 1980	1 year, 226 days
14		Lieutenant-General Ghulam Jilani Khan	Military administration (Pakistan Army)	May 1, 1980	December 30, 1985	5 years, 243 days
15		Sajjad Hussain Qureshi	Independent	December 30, 1985	December 9, 1988	2 years, 345 days
16	Portrait of Tikka Khan	General Tikka Khan	PPP	December 9, 1988	August 6, 1990	1 year, 240 days
17		Mian Muhammad Azhar	IJI	August 6, 1990	April 25, 1993	2 years, 262 days
18		Chaudhary Altaf Hussain (first tenure)	PPP	April 25, 1993	July 19, 1993	85 days
19	Iqbal Khan presenting a trophy	General Iqbal Khan	Independent	July 19, 1993	March 26, 1994	250 days
20		Chaudhary Altaf Hussain (second tenure)	PPP	March 26, 1994	May 22, 1995	1 year, 57 days
21		Raja Saroop Khan	Independent	June 19, 1995	November 6, 1996	1 year, 140 days
22		Khawaja Tariq Rahim	PPP	November 11, 1996	March 11, 1997	120 days
23		Shahid Hamid	PML(N)	March 11, 1997	August 18, 1999	2 years, 160 days
24		Zulfiqar Ali Khosa	PML(N)	August 18, 1999	October 12, 1999	55 days
25		Lieutenant-General Muhammad Safdar	Military administration (Pakistan Army)	October 25, 1999	October 29, 2001	2 years, 4 days
26		Lieutenant-General Khalid Maqbool	Military administration (Pakistan Army)	October 29, 2001	May 16, 2008	6 years, 200 days
27	Portrait of Salmaan Taseer	Salmaan Taseer	PPP	May 17, 2008	January 4, 2011	2 years, 232 days
28	Portrait of Latif Khosa	Latif Khosa	PPP	January 13, 2011	January 2, 2013	1 year, 355 days
29		Syed Ahmed Mahmud	PPP	January 3, 2013	July 31, 2013	209 days
30	Portrait of Chaudhry Mohammad Sarwar	Chaudhry Mohammad Sarwar (first tenure)	PML(N)	August 2, 2013	January 29, 2015	1 year, 180 days
31	Portrait of Malik Muhammad Rafique Rajwana	Malik Muhammad Rafique Rajwana	PML(N)	May 10, 2015	August 18, 2018	3 years, 100 days
32	Portrait of Chaudhry Mohammad Sarwar	Chaudhry Mohammad Sarwar (second tenure)	PTI	September 5, 2018	April 3, 2022	3 years, 210 days
33	Portrait of Omar Sarfraz Cheema	Omar Sarfraz Cheema	PTI	April 3, 2022	May 10, 2022	37 days
34	Portrait of Baligh Ur Rehman	Baligh Ur Rehman	PML(N)	May 30, 2022	May 10, 2024	1 year, 346 days
35	Portrait of Saleem Haider	Sardar Saleem Haider Khan	PPP	May 10, 2024	Incumbent	2 years, 180 days

== See also ==
- Chief Minister of Punjab
- Senior Minister of Punjab (Pakistan)
- Leader of the Opposition Punjab
- Speaker of the Provincial Assembly of Punjab
- Government of Punjab
- Provincial Assembly of the Punjab
- List of current Pakistani governors
- List of current Pakistani chief ministers
- List of governors of Punjab, India
- List of governors of Punjab (British India)
