= Malik Meraj Khalid caretaker government =

Caretaker Government of Malik Meraj Khalid
- 19th Cabinet of Pakistan
- 1996–1997
- Date formed: 5 November 1996
- Date dissolved: 17 February 1997

People and organisations
- Head of state: Farooq Leghari
- Head of government: Malik Meraj Khalid
- Member party: Independent; Caretaker government

History
- Election: 1997 Pakistani general election
- Outgoing election: 1993 Pakistani general election
- Legislature term: 10th National Assembly (dissolved)
- Predecessor: Second Benazir Bhutto government
- Successor: Second Nawaz Sharif government

The Malik Meraj Khalid caretaker ministry was the government and caretaker federal cabinet of Pakistan, formed under caretaker Prime Minister Malik Meraj Khalid on 5 November 1996. It succeeded the second Benazir Bhutto government and remained in office until 17 February 1997, when Nawaz Sharif took office after the 1997 Pakistani general election.

== Cabinet ==
=== Prime Minister ===
| Minister | Portfolio | Period |
|---|---|---|
| Malik Meraj Khalid | Prime Minister | 5 November 1996 – 17 February 1997 |

=== Federal ministers ===
| Minister | Portfolio | Period |
|---|---|---|
| Sahabzada Yaqub Khan | Foreign Affairs | 11 November 1996 – 17 February 1997 |
| Shahid Hamid | Defence | 11 November 1996 – 17 February 1997 |
| Omar Afridi | Interior (addl.) States & Frontier Regions, Narcotics Control | 5 November 1996 – 17 February 1997 |
| Irshad Ahmed Haqqani | Information & Broadcasting | 5 November 1996 – 17 February 1997 |
| Javed Jabbar | Petroleum & Natural Resources | 5 November 1996 – 17 February 1997 |
| Abida Hussain | Science & Technology | 5 November 1996 – 15 December 1996 |
| Shafqat Mahmood | Food, Agriculture & Livestock (addl.) Environment, Urban Affairs, Forestry & Wildlife; Local Government & Rural Development | 5 November 1996 – 17 February 1997; Food, Agriculture & Livestock until 15 December 1996 |
| Shahid Javed Burki | Finance (de facto); Economic Affairs | 11 November 1996 – 17 February 1997 |

=== Other cabinet-level appointments ===
| Office-holder | Portfolio / office | Period |
|---|---|---|
| Salman Shah | Chairman, Privatisation Commission | 5 November 1996 – 17 February 1997 |
