= NA-66 Wazirabad =

Constituency of the National Assembly of Pakistan

- Constituency for the National Assembly of Pakistan
- Region: Wazirabad District
- Electorate: 646,872

Current constituency
- Member: Vacant
- Created from: NA-101 Gujranwala-VII

NA-66 Wazirabad (این اے-66، وزیرآباد) is a constituency for the National Assembly of Pakistan. It is made up of the Wazirabad District.

== Members of Parliament ==
=== 1970–1977: NW-72 Gujranwala-III ===
Election	Member	Party
1970	Ghulam Haider Cheema	PPP

=== 1977–1988: NA-98 Gujranwala-I ===
Election	Member	Party
1977	Ghulam Haider Cheema	PPP
1985	Hamid Nasir Chattha	IND

=== 1988–2002: NA-74 Gujranwala-I ===
Election	Member	Party
1988	Ghulam Sarwar Cheema	PPP
1990	Hamid Nasir Chattha	IJI
1993	Hamid Nasir Chattha	PML (J)
1997	Ghulam Sarwar Cheema	PML (N)

=== 2002–2018: NA-101 Gujranwala-VII ===
Election	Member	Party
2002	Hamid Nasir Chattha	PML (J)
2008	Iftikhar Ahmed Cheema	PML (N)
2013	Iftikhar Ahmed Cheema	PML (N)
2016	Iftikhar Ahmed Cheema	PML (N)

=== 2018–2023: NA-79 Gujranwala-I ===
Election	Member	Party
2018	Nisar Ahmed Cheema	PML (N)

=== 2024–2025: NA-66 Wazirabad ===
Election	Member	Party
2024	Muhammad Ahmed Chattha	PTI

== Election 2002 ==
General elections were held on 10 October 2002. Hamid Nasir Chattha of PML-J won by 69,171 votes.

General election 2002: NA-101 Gujranwala-VII
Party	Candidate	Votes	%	±%
PML(J)	Hamid Nasir Chatha	69,171	48.10	
PPP	Asma Shahnawaz Cheema	64,355	44.75	
Independent	Shoukat Hayat Chatha	7,169	4.99	
Others	Others (two candidates)	3,126	2.16	
Turnout		148,718	49.14	
Total valid votes		143,821	96.71	
Rejected ballots		4,897	3.29	
Majority		4,816	3.35	
Registered electors		302,628		

== Election 2008 ==
General elections were held on 18 February 2008. Justice (R) Iftikhar Ahmad Cheema of PML-N won by 71,792 votes.

General election 2008: NA-101 Gujranwala-VII
Party	Candidate	Votes	%	±%
PML(N)	Iftikhar Ahmad Cheema	71,792	44.59	
PML(Q)	Hamid Nasir Chatha	48,813	30.32	
PPP	Asma Shahnawaz Cheema	37,554	23.32	
Others	Others (two candidates)	2,851	1.77	
Turnout		165,902	43.93	
Total valid votes		161,010	97.05	
Rejected ballots		4,892	2.95	
Majority		22,979	14.27	
Registered electors		377,640		
PML(N) gain from PML(J)				

== Election 2013 ==
General elections were held on 11 May 2013. Justice (R) Iftikhar Ahmed Cheema of PML-N won by 99,924 votes and became the member of National Assembly.

General election 2013: NA-101 Gujranwala-VII
Party	Candidate	Votes	%	±%
PML(N)	Iftikhar Ahmad Cheema	99,924	50.35	
PML(J)	Muhammad Ahmad Chatha	60,795	30.63	
PML(Q)	Ch. Sajid Hussain Chatha	13,886	7.00	
PTI	Ch. Muhammad Shahnawaz Cheema	11,592	5.84	
Others	Others (thirteen candidates)	12,260	6.18	
Turnout		204,854	58.19	
Total valid votes		198,457	96.88	
Rejected ballots		6,397	3.12	
Majority		39,129	19.72	
Registered electors		352,057		
PML(N) hold				

== By-election 2016 ==
A by-election was held on 22 March 2016 in which Iftikhar Ahmed Cheema of PML (N) won the seat. He secured 82,420 votes defeating his rival Muhammad Ahmed Chattha of Pakistan Tehreek-e-Insaf.

By-election 2016: NA-101 Gujranwala-VII
Party	Candidate	Votes	%	±%
PML(N)	Iftikhar Ahmad Cheema	82,887	49.02	
PTI	Muhammad Ahmed Chattha	81,218	48.04	
Others	Others (thirteen candidates)	4,970	2.94	
Turnout		185,169	47.97	
Total valid votes		169,075	91.31	
Rejected ballots		16,094	8.69	
Majority		1,669	0.98	
Registered electors		386,016		
PML(N) hold				

== Election 2018 ==
General elections were held on 25 July 2018.

General election 2018: NA-79 Gujranwala-I
Party	Candidate	Votes	%	±%
PML(N)	Nisar Ahmed Cheema	142,545	48.13	
PTI	Muhammad Ahmed Chattha	118,709	40.08	
Others	Others (twelve candidates)	29,960	10.12	
Turnout		296,174	54.66	
Rejected ballots		4,960	1.67	
Majority		23,836	8.05	
Registered electors		541,848		
PML(N) hold		Swing	N/A	

== Election 2024 ==
General elections were held on 8 February 2024. Muhammad Ahmed Chattha won the election with 160,850 votes.

General election 2024: NA-66 Wazirabad
Party	Candidate	Votes	%	±%
PTI	Muhammad Ahmed Chattha (Note: Filed nomination papers as PTI candidate but ECP allowed him to run as an Independent)	160,850	52.81	▲12.73
PML(N)	Nisar Ahmed Cheema	100,684	33.06	▼15.07
TLP	Muhammad Akram	18,974	6.23	▲1.77
Others	Others (twenty-four candidates)	24,070	7.90	
Turnout		313,767	48.51	▼6.15
Total valid votes		304,578	97.07	
Rejected ballots		9,189	2.93	
Majority		60,166	19.75	
Registered electors		646,872		

== By-election 2025 ==
A by-election will be held on 22 November 2025 due to the disqualification of Muhammad Ahmed Chattha, the previous member from this seat.

== See also ==
- NA-65 Gujrat-IV
- NA-67 Hafizabad
