= Qureshi caretaker government =

Pakistani caretaker government (1993)

Qureshi caretaker ministry
- 33rd Cabinet of Pakistan
- Incumbent
- Date formed: 18 August 1993
- Date dissolved: 19 October 1993

People and organisations
- Head of state: Wasim Sajjad
- Head of government: Moeen Qureshi
- Total no. of members: 12
- Status in legislature: Caretaker government

History
- Outgoing election: 1993 general election
- Incoming formation: Mazari caretaker
- Predecessor: Nawaz I
- Successor: Benazir II

The Qureshi caretaker ministry under Moeen Qureshi as the caretaker prime minister of Pakistan was sworn into office on 18 August 1993 and only served for three months. Qureshi's tenure as caretaker prime minister is known for the various reforms it brought to the political and bureaucratic setups within the country.

== Government formation ==
=== 1993 constitutional crisis ===
Pakistan was "plunged into chaos" as president Ghulam Ishaq Khan and prime minister Nawaz Sharif duelled for supremacy. Even though neither was successful, they put nearly all of Pakistan's institutions at risk. It was then that the army chief Gen Abdul Waheed Kakar called both the President and Prime minister to negotiate this political power crisis.

Two weeks of intense negotiations ensued and the crisis came to an abrupt end in July 1993 when the prime minister resigned from his post. Sharif's resignation was part of a negotiated settlement whereby he had asked also for the removal of president Khan. Subsequently following Sharif's resignation, army chief Kakar and the JCSC chairman Gen Shamim Alam Khan forced Ishaq Khan to resign from his presidency thus ending the political standoff.

=== Authorising a caretaker setup ===
The resignations were welcomed as a unique gesture by the sitting government where they were seen to have voluntarily stepped down for the first time to avoid a possible military intervention. A caretaker government was authorised under the supervision of Senate chairman Wasim Sajjad who became the caretaker president.

The first order of business for Sajjad was to call Moeenuddin Ahmad Qureshi back to Pakistan from his home in the United States. Qureshi was a former Pakistani bureaucrat who had also served as the vice-president of the World Bank. Qureshi was appointed as the caretaker prime minister in hopes that "[he could] ease Pakistan over the monumental crisis its political and military leaders had created". Qureshi was the choice of the civil-military bureaucracy, not the politicians. He had been tasked to restore public confidence in government.

=== Preparing for the next election ===
Upon the appointment of Qureshi as the caretaker prime minister, it was announced that the next general election would be held on 6 October 1993. In preparing for the election, the Qureshi caretaker ministry issued a list of loan defaulters who may be barred from contesting the new elections. The ministry also published a "sensational roster of the amounts paid in income tax by some of the richest people in the country, including the Sharif family".

Qureshi introduced sweeping reforms during the three months that his caretaker government was in power. He cut government spending, raised taxes, devalued the Pakistani rupee and fattened a thinning foreign reserve account. Following the allegations of corruption on the Sharif family, the previous government's Yellow Cab Scheme was scrapped and the Motorways Project was also shelved.

== Qureshi's cabinet ==
A caretaker cabinet of 12 ministers took an oath on 18 August 1993 under caretaker prime minister Qureshi and the caretaker president Sajjad. In formulating his cabinet and cutting the government expenses, Qureshi ordered the closing down of 15 ministries and ten embassies. With the prime ministerial mantle going to a technocrat, the Qureshi caretaker cabinet is considered to be one of the most efficient caretaker setups in the country.

Ministry	Minister
Caretaker Prime Minister	Moeenuddin Ahmad Qureshi
Ministry of Interior & Narcotics Control, Inter Provincial Coordination	Fateh Khan Bandial
Ministry of Railways and Communications	Ahmad Faruque
Ministry of Finance, Economic Affairs and Planning & Development	Syed Babar Ali
Ministry of Education, Social Welfare, Health and KANA	Lt Gen Mohammad Shafiq
Ministry of Foreign Affairs	Abdul Sattar
Ministry of Information, SAFRON, Management Services, Culture	Nisar Memon (additional charge)
Ministry of Food, Agriculture & Cooperatives, Local Government & Rural Development, Housing and Works	Ali Khan Junejo
Petroleum and Natural Resources, Production and Defence Production	Lt Gen Rehm Dil Bhatti
Ministry of Law, Justice & Parliamentary Affairs, Religious Affairs and Minorities Affairs	Abdul Shakurul Salam
Ministry of Commerce and Tourism	Hafeez A Pasha
Ministry of Industry, Labour and Manpower, Overseas Pakistanis, Women Development and Youth Affairs	D. K. Riyaz Baloch
Ministry of Water and Power	Khursheed Marker
