= Ghulam Sarwar Khan =

Pakistani politician (born 1952)

- غلام سرور خان

Federal Minister for Aviation
- In office 18 April 2019 – 10 April 2022
- President: Arif Alvi
- Prime Minister: Imran Khan

Federal Minister for Petroleum
- In office 20 August 2018 – 18 April 2019
- President: Mamnoon Hussain; Arif Alvi
- Prime Minister: Imran Khan
- Preceded by: Syed Ali Zafar (caretaker)
- Succeeded by: Omar Ayub Khan

Federal Minister for Labour and Manpower
- In office 31 August 2004 – 15 November 2007
- President: Pervez Musharraf
- Prime Minister: Shaukat Aziz

Member of the National Assembly of Pakistan
- In office 13 August 2018 – 17 January 2023
- Constituency: NA-59 (Rawalpindi-III)
- In office 1 June 2013 – 31 May 2018
- Constituency: NA-53 (Rawalpindi)
- In office 23 November 2002 – 15 November 2007
- Constituency: NA-53 (Rawalpindi)

Provincial Minister Punjab for Zakat and Ushr
- In office October 1993 – November 1996
- Chief Minister: Manzoor Wattoo, Arif Nakai

Provincial Minister Punjab for Mineral Development
- In office October 1993 – November 1996
- Chief Minister: Manzoor Wattoo, Arif Nakai

Provincial Minister Punjab for Fisheries
- In office October 1993 – November 1996
- Chief Minister: Manzoor Wattoo, Arif Nakai

Provincial Minister Punjab for Health
- In office 1994 – November 1996
- Chief Minister: Manzoor Wattoo, Arif Nakai

Member of the Provincial Assembly of the Punjab
- In office 12 March 1985 – 30 May 1988
- Constituency: PP-5 (Rawalpindi-V)
- In office 30 November 1988 – 6 August 1990
- Constituency: PP-5 (Rawalpindi-V)
- In office 5 November 1990 – 28 June 1993
- Constituency: PP-5 (Rawalpindi-V)
- In office 18 October 1993 – 17 November 1996
- Constituency: PP-5 (Rawalpindi-V)

Personal details
- Born: 13 October 1952 (age 74)
- Party: IPP (2023–present)
- Other political affiliations: PTI (2011–2023); PML(Q) (2002–2011); PPP (1988–2002)
- Relations: Ammar Siddique Khan (nephew)
- Children: Malik Mansoor Hayat Khan (son)

Malik Ghulam Sarwar Khan (Urdu: غلام سرور خان; born 13 October 1952) is a Pakistani politician who was the former Federal Minister for Aviation, in office from 24 May 2019 to 10 April 2022. Prior to this position, he was appointed as Federal Minister for Petroleum on 20 August 2018, but he was shifted to the Aviation Ministry. He had been a member of the National Assembly of Pakistan, from August 2018 till January 2023. Previously, he was a member of the National Assembly from 2002 to 2007 and again from June 2013 to May 2018. He remained a member of the Provincial Assembly of the Punjab from 1985 to 1996.

== Early life and education ==
According to the newspaper Dawn, Khan was born on 13 October 1955 in Taxila, Punjab, while according to PILDAT he was born on 13 October 1954.

He received a Bachelor of Arts degree from the University of the Punjab. He is an agriculturist by profession.

=== Fake degree case ===
In 2002, the authenticity of his diploma degree from the Punjab Board of Technical Education was challenged. In 2007, a petition was filed in the Supreme Court of Pakistan challenging the authenticity of diploma which Khan had received from the Government College University (Faisalabad).

In July 2013, the Supreme Court suspended the National Assembly's membership of Khan for possessing counterfeit degree. According to a report submitted by the Higher Education Commission, both his graduation degree and his diploma in engineering were found fake.

== Political career ==
Khan was elected to the Provincial Assembly of the Punjab from PP-5 (Rawalpindi-V) in the 1985 Pakistani general election.

He was re-elected to the Provincial Assembly of the Punjab as a candidate of the Pakistan People's Party (PPP) from PP-5 (Rawalpindi-V) in the 1988 general election. He received 43,343 votes and defeated Muhammad Kamal, a candidate of the Islami Jamhoori Ittehad (IJI).

Khan ran for the seat of the National Assembly of Pakistan as a candidate of the People's Democratic Alliance (PDA) from NA-40 (Rawalpindi-V) in the 1990 Pakistani general election, but was unsuccessful. He received 63,021 votes and lost the seat to Nisar Ali Khan, a candidate of the IJI. In the same election, he was re-elected to the Provincial Assembly of the Punjab as a candidate of the PDA from Constituency PP-5 (Rawalpindi-V). He received 36,469 votes and defeated Muhammad Kamal, a candidate of the IJI.

He ran for the seat of the National Assembly as a candidate of the PPP from NA-40 (Rawalpindi-V) in the 1993 Pakistani general election, but was unsuccessful. He received 64,800 votes and lost the seat to Nisar Ali Khan, a candidate of the Pakistan Muslim League (N) (PML(N)). In the same election, he was re-elected to the Provincial Assembly of the Punjab as a candidate of the PPP from PP-5 (Rawalpindi-V). He received 40,132 votes and defeated Dildar Khan, a candidate of the PML(N). Following the election, he was inducted into the provincial Punjab cabinet and was appointed Provincial Minister of Punjab for Zakat and Ushr with the additional ministerial portfolios of Mineral Development, and Fisheries. He also served as the provincial minister of Punjab for health from 1994 to 1996.

He ran for the seat of the Provincial Assembly of the Punjab as a candidate of PPP from PP-5 (Rawalpindi-V) in the 1997 Punjab provincial election, but was unsuccessful. He received 26,372 votes and lost the seat to Malik Umar Farooq, a candidate of the PML(N).

He was elected to the National Assembly as an independent candidate from Constituency NA-53 (Rawalpindi-IV) in the 2002 Pakistani general election. He received 66,900 votes and defeated Nisar Ali Khan, a candidate of the PML(N). In the same election, he was re-elected to the Provincial Assembly of the Punjab as an independent candidate from Constituency PP-8 (Rawalpindi-VIII). He received 21,961 votes and defeated Muhammad Waqas, a candidate of the Muttahida Majlis-e-Amal (MMA). He vacated his provincial seat and retained the National Assembly seat. Soon after his election, he joined the Pakistan Muslim League (Q) (PML(Q)).

In 2004, he was inducted into the federal cabinet of Prime Minister Shaukat Aziz and was appointed as Federal Minister for Labour and Manpower.

He ran for the seat of the National Assembly as a candidate of PML(Q) from NA-53 (Rawalpindi-IV) in the 2008 Pakistani general election, but was unsuccessful. He received 49,068 votes and lost the seat to Nisar Ali Khan, a candidate of the PML(N).

He was re-elected to the National Assembly as a candidate of Pakistan Tehreek-e-Insaf (PTI) from NA-53 (Rawalpindi-IV) in the 2013 Pakistani general election. He received 110,593 votes and defeated Nisar Ali Khan, a candidate of the PML(N).

He was re-elected to the National Assembly as a candidate of PTI from NA-59 (Rawalpindi-III) and from NA-63 (Rawalpindi-VII) in the 2018 Pakistani general election. Following his election, he decided to retain the NA-59 (Rawalpindi-III) seat and abandon the NA-63 (Rawalpindi-VII) seat.

On 18 August, Imran Khan formally announced his federal cabinet structure and Khan was named as Minister for Petroleum. On 20 August 2018, he was sworn in as Federal Minister for Petroleum in the federal cabinet of Prime Minister Imran Khan.

On 18 April 2018 he resigned as Minister for Petroleum on Imran Khan's orders after a major cabinet reshuffle. There were rumors that he would leave PTI but he denied the rumors, later he was appointed the Federal Minister for Aviation. On 10 April 2022, after the success of the no-confidence motion against Imran Khan, the Cabinet dissolved and he ceased to be the Federal Minister for Aviation.

He resigned from the National Assembly soon after, along with most of the other PTI MNAs. His resignation was accepted on 17 January 2023.

On 22 June 2023, he left the PTI due to the 2023 Pakistani protests.

On 31 October 2023, he joined the Istehkam-e-Pakistan Party (IPP).
