= 1997 Punjab provincial election =

Election in Pakistan

- 3 February 1997

All 240 seats in the Provincial Assembly 120 seats needed for a majority
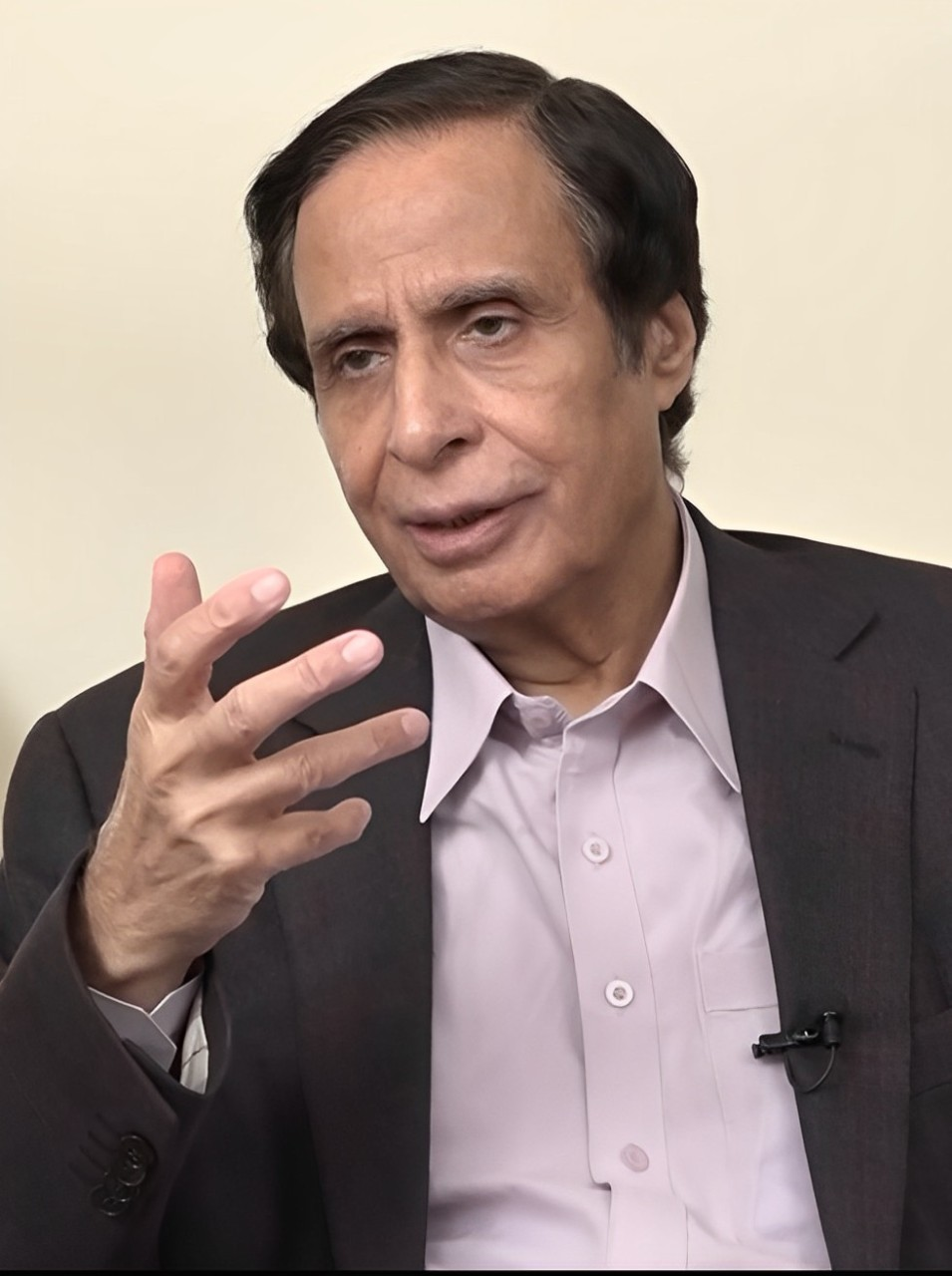

	First party	Second party
Leader	Pervaiz Elahi	Did not declare
Party	PML(N)	PPP
Leader's seat	Gujrat-IV
Last election	105	93
Seats won	211	3
Seat change	▲106	▼90
Popular vote	6,608,784	2,557,786
Percentage	53.29	20.63%
Chief Minister before election
Manzoor Wattoo
PML(J)
Elected Chief Minister
Shehbaz Sharif
PML(N)

Provincial Assembly elections were held in Punjab, Pakistan on 3 February 1997 to elect all 240 members of the Provincial Assembly of Punjab, Pakistan along with nationwide general elections and three other provincial elections in Sindh, Balochistan, and North-West Frontier Province. The elections were held as a result of dismissal of Benazir Bhutto's second government by President Farooq Leghari in November 1996. After which, a caretaker government was inducted in Punjab under Mian muhammad Afzal Hayat, a former member of Punjab Assembly, as the Caretaker Chief Minister.

== Results ==
The Pakistan Muslim League (Nawaz) achieved a landslide victory by securing 211 out of 240 seats, leaving their primary competitor, the Pakistan Peoples Party, far behind with just 3 seats at third place while the Independent candidates won 21 seats finishing second.

Party	Votes	%	Seats	+/–
Pakistan Muslim League (N)	6,608,784	53.22	211	+106
Pakistan Peoples Party	2,557,786	20.60	3	-90
Pakistan Muslim League (J)	175,171	1.41	2	−16
Pakistan Democratic Party	50,026	0.40	1	New
Muslim Ittehad Pakistan	27,378	0.22	1	New
Others	440,663	3.55	0	–
Independents	2,557,786	20.60	21	+3
Total	12,417,594	100.00	239	0
Source: Election Pakistan

== Aftermath ==
After the elections, Shehbaz Sharif assumed the role of Chief Minister of Punjab on February 20, 1997. His appointment to this position came about as a result of receiving 226 votes during the assembly vote, which lead to the formation of a supermajority government.
