= Second Benazir Bhutto government =

Pakistani federal government (1993–96)

Second Benazir Bhutto Government
- 29th Cabinet of Pakistan
- 1993–1996
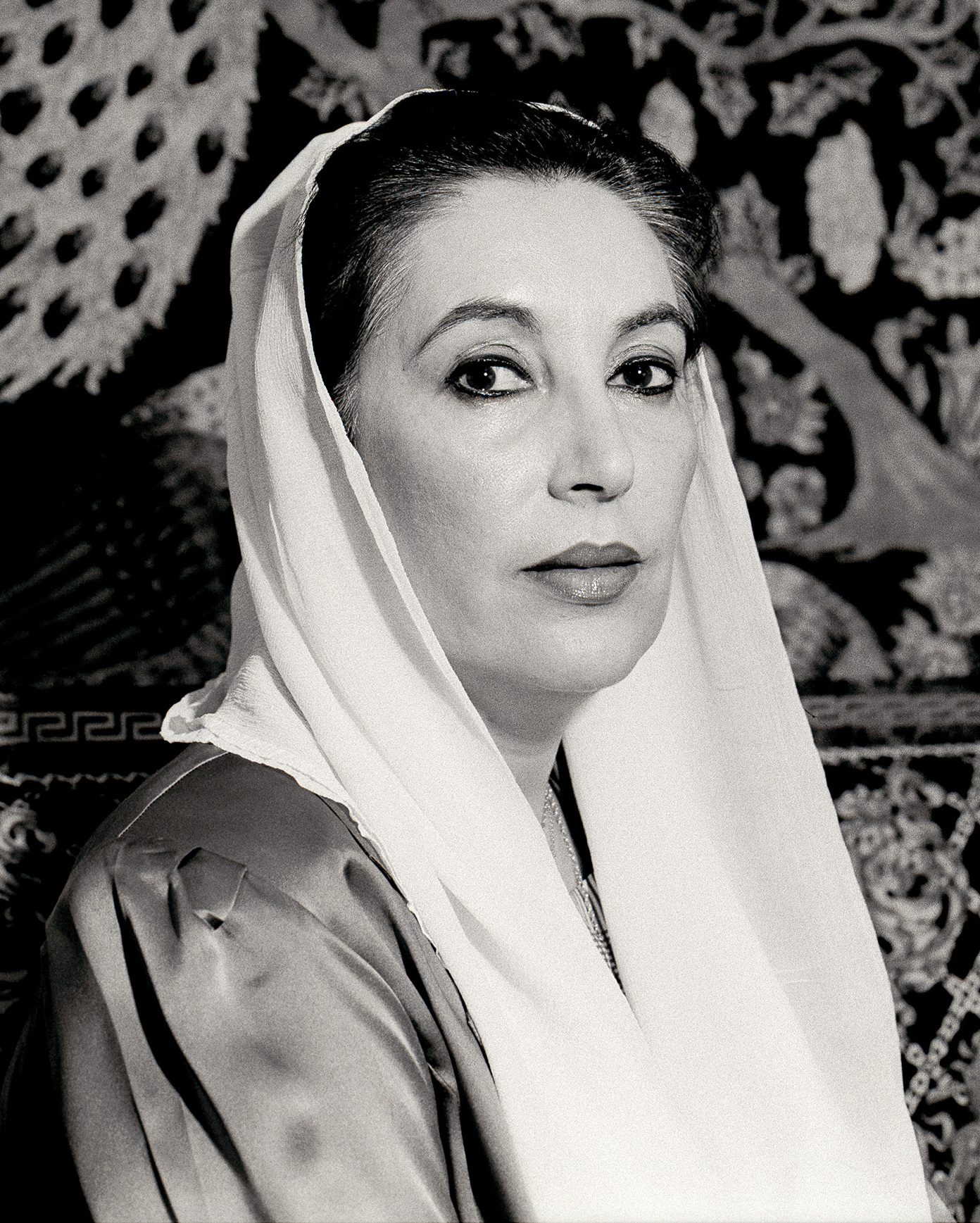
- Date formed: 19 October 1993
- Date dissolved: 5 November 1996

People and organisations
- President of Pakistan: Farooq Leghari
- Chief of Army Staff: Abdul Waheed Kakar (1993–1995) Jehangir Karamat (1996–1998)
- Prime Minister of Pakistan: Benazir Bhutto
- Prime Minister of Pakistan's history: 2nd Premiership of Benazir Bhutto (1993–1996)
- DG-Interservice Intelligence: Javed Ashraf Qazi (1993–1995); Naseem Rana (1996–1998)
- Total no. of members: 40 (incl. Prime Minister)
- Member party: PPP; ANP; PML(J)
- Status in legislature: Coalition (Plurality)
- Opposition party: PML(N)
- Opposition leader: Nawaz Sharif

History
- Election: 1993 general elections
- Legislature terms: 10th National Assembly (1993–1996)
- Advice and consent: Parliament of Pakistan: National Assembly; Senate of Pakistan
- Incoming formation: Qureshi caretaker government
- Outgoing formation: Khalid caretaker government
- Predecessor: First Nawaz Sharif government
- Successor: Second Nawaz Sharif government

The Second Benazir Bhutto government was formed on 19 October 1993, following general elections the same month and dissolved on 5 November 1996 by President Farooq Leghari. During the beginning of her second term Benazir Bhutto entered into a much stronger government than in her first term and had greater experience in administration and civil-military relations. This owing to Peoples Parties governments in Sindh, NWFP (with the ANP) and Punjab (with PML-Jinnah), the election of PPP "loyalist" Farooq Leghari to the presidency, and greater relations with the Army under COAS Abdul Waheed Kakar and DG-ISI Javed Ashraf Qazi, who provided a conduit between the Army Chief and Prime Minister, as Benazir Bhutto respected the army's internal affairs and autonomy in her second term to avoid conflict. However, the government's stability suffered from economic mismanagement, growing instances of ethno-sectarian violence, increasing deadlock with the opposition PML(N), an antagonized upper-judiciary after Bhutto tried to "pack" the High Courts and later a political conflict with the President. The Army (now under Gen Jehangir Karamat) which previously remained neutral became concerned over the "fast deteriorating" economic and law-and-order situation, submitting the President a report warning of "economic disaster". The last straw came in September 1996 when Bhutto's brother, Murtaza was assassinated following tensions between the two. By mid-October, senior military officials no longer believed the government had the required competence, and therefore supported Farooq Leghari in the political conflict between President and Prime Minister. Prior to this Farooq Leghari had already met with Nawaz Sharif and discussed the dismissal of the government. Confident in military support and to pre-empt a PPP-PML(J) vote of no confidence in Punjab, (Note: Against CM Manzoor Wattoo of the PML(Jinnah) who previously broke with the PPP and came into political conflict with the Bhutto government, leading to his dismissal by the governor of Punjab for 'corruption, nepotism and violation of the PPP-PML(J) manifesto.' Leading to another PPP-PML(J) coalition being established under Sardar Arif Nakai. Wattoo lodged an appeal to the Lahore High Court, which later restored his government two days before the dismissal of the second Benazir Bhutto administration.) as well as due to economic conditions the President dismissed the government of Benazir Bhutto on 5 November 1996.

== Federal Cabinet ==
=== Heads of State and Government ===
President of Pakistan	Prime Minister of Pakistan
Farooq Leghari 1993–1997	Benazir Bhutto 1993–1996

=== Cabinet Composition ===
← Benazir II Government → (19 October 1993 – 5 November 1996)
Sr. No.	Name	Portfolio	Party	Term start	Term end	Ref.
==== Federal Ministers ====
1	Farooq Leghari	Foreign Affairs	Pakistan Peoples Party	19 October 1993	11 November 1993	
2	Aftab Shaban Mirani	Defence	Pakistan Peoples Party	19 October 1993	5 November 1996	
3	Sher Afgan Khan Niazi	Law, Justice & Parliamentary Affairs	Independent	21 October 1993	16 November 1993	
3	Sher Afgan Khan Niazi	Social Welfare & Spl. Education	Independent	16 November 1993	5 October 1996	
3	Sher Afgan Khan Niazi	Human Rights	Independent	28 October 1996	5 October 1996	
4	Maj-Gen (R) N. Babar	Interior, Narcotics Control, & Federal Investigation	Pakistan Peoples Party	21 October 1993	5 October 1996	
5	Brig (R) M. Asghar	Industries & Production	Pakistan Muslim League (Jinnah)	21 October 1993	5 October 1996	
6	Afzal Khan Lala	SAFRON	Awami National Party	21 October 1993	27 October 1993	
6	Afzal Khan Lala	MKANA	Awami National Party	27 October 1993	5 October 1996	
7	Aseff Ahmad Daula	Foreign Affairs	Pakistan Peoples Party	16 November 1993	5 October 1996	
8	Iqbal Haider	Law, Justice and Parliamentary Affairs	Pakistan Peoples Party	16 November 1993	20 December 1994	
9	Ameen Faheem	Housing and Works	Pakistan Peoples Party	26 January 1994	5 October 1996	
10	Anwar Saifullah Khan	Petroleum and Natural Resources	Pakistan Muslim League (Junejo)	26 January 1994	5 October 1996	
11	Ghulam Mustafa Khar	Water and Power	Pakistan Peoples Party	26 January 1994	5 October 1996	
12	Ahmad Mukhtar	Commerce	Pakistan Peoples Party	26 January 1994	5 October 1996	
13	Khalid Ahmad Kharal	Information and Broadcasting	Pakistan Peoples Party	26 January 1994	5 October 1996	
14	Khurshed Ahmad Shah	Education	Pakistan Peoples Party	26 January 1994	5 October 1996	
15	Nawab Yousuf Talpur	Food, Agriculture & Livestock	Pakistan Peoples Party	26 January 1994	5 October 1996	
16	Julius Salik	Population Welfare	Independent	26 January 1994	5 October 1996	
17	Prof. N. D. Khan	Law, Justice & Parliamentary Affairs	Independent	20 December 1994	5 October 1996	
18	Abdul Qadir Shah Jillani	Minister without portfolio	Pakistan Peoples Party	20 December 1994	5 October 1996	
19	Arbab M. Jehangir Khan	Narcotics Control	Pakistan Peoples Party	1 August 1996	5 October 1996	
20	Rao Sikandar Iqbal	Sports and Tourism	Pakistan Peoples Party	1 August 1996	5 October 1996	
21	M. Nawaz Khokhar	Science and Technology	Pakistan Muslim League (Nawaz)	31 July 1996	5 October 1996	
22	Jehangir Bader	Political Affairs & Religious Affairs	Pakistan Peoples Party	31 July 1996	5 October 1996	
23	Ch. Abdul Sattar Viryo	Industries	Pakistan Muslim League (Jinnah)	1 August 1996	5 October 1996	
24	Iqbal Haider	Human Rights	Pakistan Peoples Party	1 August 1996	28 October 1996	
25	Asif Ali Zardari	Investment	Pakistan Peoples Party	1 August 1996	5 October 1996	
26	Naveed Qamar	Privatization	Pakistan Peoples Party	1 August 1996	5 October 1996	
26	Naveed Qamar	Finance	Pakistan Peoples Party	28 October 1996	5 October 1996	
==== Ministers of State ====
1	Ahmad Mukhtar	Commerce	Pakistan Peoples Party	21 October 1993	26 January 1994	
2	Ghulam Akbar Lasi	Labour and Manpower	Pakistan Peoples Party	26 January 1994	5 October 1996	
3	Makhdoom Shahabuddin	Finance	Pakistan Peoples Party	26 January 1994	5 October 1996	
4	Abdul Qayum Khan Jatoi	States and Frontier Regions	Pakistan Muslim League (Nawaz)	26 January 1994	5 October 1996	
5	Raza Rabbani	Law and Justice	Pakistan Peoples Party	20 December 1994	5 October 1996	
6	Shah Mahmood Qureshi	Parliamentary Affairs	Pakistan Peoples Party	20 December 1994	5 October 1996	
7	Muhammad Ayub Khan	Local Government & Rural Development	Pakistan Peoples Party	1 August 1996	5 October 1996	
8	Muhammad Ayub Jattak	Food	Baloch National Movement (M)	1 August 1996	5 October 1996	
9	Muhammad Nazeer Sultan	Foreign Affairs	Pakistan Peoples Party	1 August 1996	5 October 1996	
10	Nauraiz Shakoor Khan	Youth Affairs	Pakistan Peoples Party	1 August 1996	5 October 1996	
11	Muhammad Nasir Baig	Sports	Pakistan Peoples Party	1 August 1996	5 October 1996	
12	M. Afaque Khan Shahid	Works	Pakistan Peoples Party	1 August 1996	5 October 1996	
13	Manzoor Hussain Wassan	Water	Pakistan Peoples Party	1 August 1996	5 October 1996	

== See also ==
- Benazir Bhutto
- Farooq Leghari
- History of Pakistan (1947–present)
- Government of Pakistan
- Cabinet of Pakistan
- List of prime ministers of Pakistan
- 1993 Pakistani general election
- 1993 in Pakistan

== Bibliography ==
- Rizvi, Hasan-Askari (September 1, 2000). Military, State and Society in Pakistan (2000th ed.). Palgrave Macmillan. ISBN 978-0312231934.
- Cloughley, Brian (January 5, 2016). A History of the Pakistan Army: Wars and Insurrections (5th ed.). Carrel Books. ISBN 978-1631440380.
- Ziring, Lawrence (September 5, 2005). Pakistan: At the Crosscurrent of History. Oneworld Publications. ISBN 978-1851683949.
- Nawaz, Shuja (October 11, 2009). Crossed Swords: Pakistan, Its Army, and the Wars Within (1st ed.). Oxford University Press. ISBN 978-0195476972.
- Khan, Hamid (2017). Constitutional and Political History of Pakistan (3rd ed.). Oxford University Press. ISBN 978-0199407828.
- Talbot, Ian (January 15, 2010). Pakistan: A Modern History (2nd ed.). Palgrave Macmillan. ISBN 978-0230623040.
