= Chaudry Iftikhar Hussain Chachar =

Pakistani politician

Chaudhry Iftikhar Hussain Chhachhar

Member of the Provincial Assembly of the Punjab
- In office 15 August 2018 – 14 January 2023
- Constituency: PP-187 Okara-III
- In office 29 May 2013 – 31 May 2018
- In office 2002–2007

Personal details
- Born: 10 July 1976 (age 50) Okara, Punjab, Pakistan
- Party: PMLN (2002-present)

Chaudhry Iftikhar Hussain Chhachhar is a Pakistani politician who was a Member of the Provincial Assembly of the Punjab, from 2002 to 2007, from May 2013 to May 2018 and from August 2018 to January 2023. He has publicly supported ex-Prime Minister of Pakistan, Nawaz Sharif.

== Early life and education ==
He was born on 10 July 1976 in Basirpur Okara.

He graduated in 2000 from Punjab Law College and has a degree of Bachelor of Laws LL. B.

== Political career ==
He was elected to the Provincial Assembly of the Punjab as an independent candidate from Constituency PP-188 (Okara-IV) in the 2002 Pakistani general election. He received 27,767 votes and defeated Syed Raza Ali Gillani.

He ran for the seat of the Provincial Assembly of the Punjab as an independent candidate from Constituency PP-188 (Okara-IV) in the 2008 Pakistani general election but was unsuccessful. He received 16,248 votes and lost the seat to Robina Shaheen Wattoo, an independent candidate. In 2012, he ran for the seat of the National Assembly of Pakistan as an independent candidate from Constituency NA-147 (Okara-V) in by-polls but was unsuccessful. He received 51 votes and lost the seat to Khurram Jahangir Wattoo.

He was re-elected to the Provincial Assembly of the Punjab as a candidate of Pakistan Muslim League (N) (PML-N) from Constituency PP-188 (Okara-IV) in the 2013 Pakistani general election. He received 47,222 votes and defeated Manzoor Wattoo.

He was re-elected to Provincial Assembly of the Punjab as a candidate of PML-N from Constituency PP-185 (Okara-III) in the 2018 Pakistani general election.

He was re-elected to Provincial Assembly of the Punjab as a candidate of PML-N from Constituency PP-187 (Okara-III) in the 2024 Pakistani general election.
