= Pakistan Muslim League – Jinnah =

Dissolved Pakistani political party

Pakistan Muslim League – Jinnah پاکستان مسلم لیگ – جناح
- Leader: Manzoor Wattoo
- Founder: Manzoor Wattoo
- Founded: 1995
- Dissolved: 2004
- Split from: Pakistan Muslim League – Junejo
- Merged into: Pakistan Muslim League – Quaid
- Ideology: Pakistani nationalism Conservatism

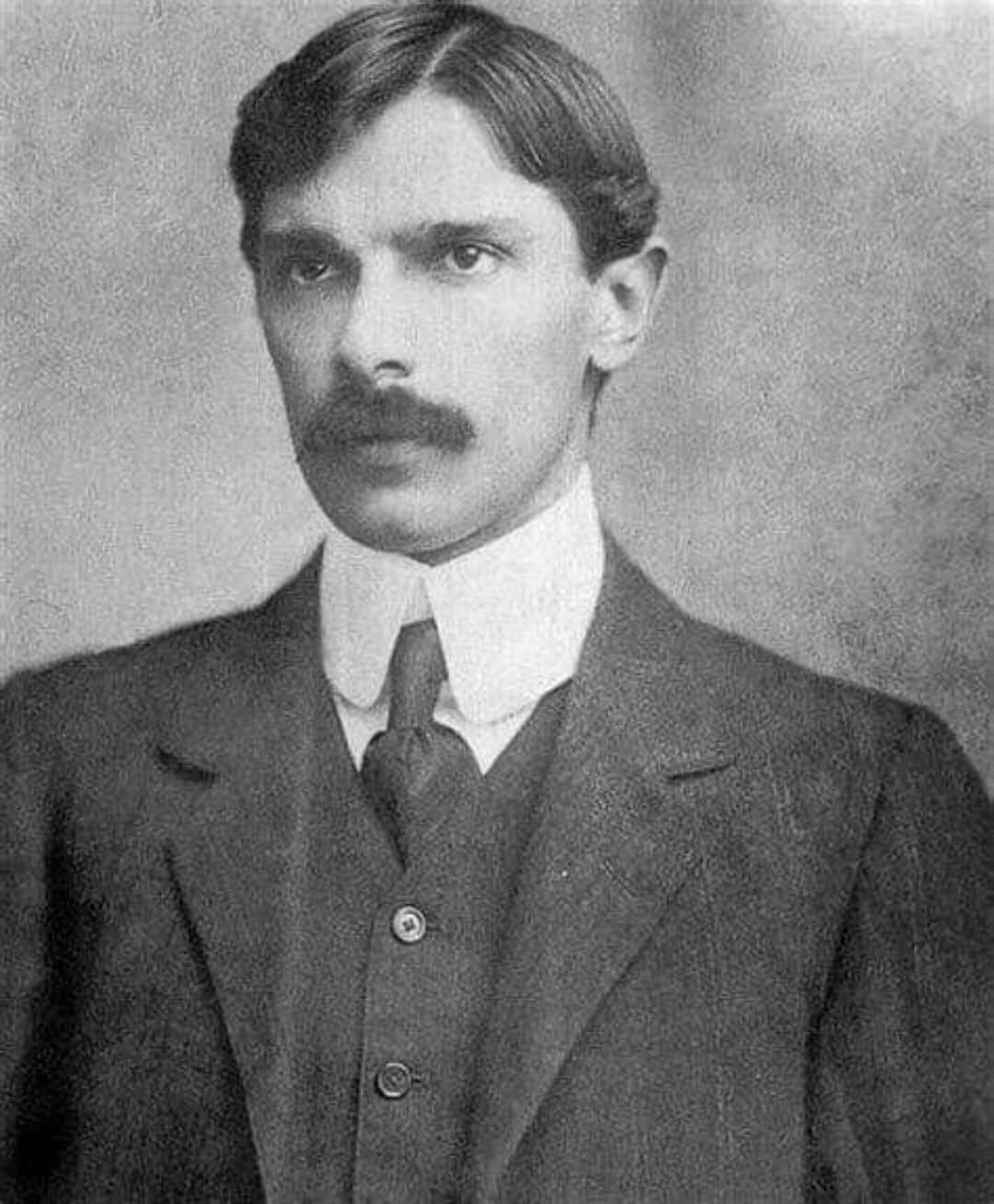
Mohammad Ali Jinnah, 1910

The Pakistan Muslim League – Jinnah (Note: Urdu: پاکستان مسلم لیگ – جناح) (PML–J) was a political party in Pakistan. It was one of the factions of the original Pakistan Muslim League, named after the founder of Pakistan Muhammad Ali Jinnah.

PML – Jinnah was formed by Manzoor Wattoo in 1995 when they parted ways with Wattoo's cousin Hamid Nasir Chattha, who wanted to be the president of his own PML faction, PML – Junejo, which Wattoo was previously a part of. The differences cropped up in the same year when Wattoo was removed as the Punjab Chief Minister in the power struggle between the province (headed by PML–Junejo) and the center (headed by rival PPP), leading Arif Nakai another PML – Junejo candidate to be the new Chief Minister.

In May 2004, PML – Jinnah merged with PML–Q along with other parties to form united PML.

However, in the 2008 general election, Manzoor Wattoo and his daughter Rubina Shaheen Wattoo sought elections independently (and won three seats in total). It was later stated that Wattoo will bring back PML – Jinnah and the reason he didn't run on PML – Jinnah ticket was because he failed the deadline to register it with the Election Commission.

In May 2008, Manzoor Wattoo (along with his daughter Rubina Shaheen Wattoo) left Pakistan Muslim League – Jinnah and joined Pakistan People's Party (PPP).
