= Iftikhar Cheema =

Pakistani politician (1939–2025)

- افتخار چیمہ

Member of the National Assembly of Pakistan
- In office 7 April 2016 – 31 May 2018
- Constituency: NA-101 (Gujranwala-VII)
- In office 17 March 2008 – 25 January 2016
- Constituency: NA-101 (Gujranwala-VII)

Personal details
- Born: 1 January 1939 Wazirabad, Punjab Province, British India
- Died: 9 November 2025 (aged 86)
- Party: Pakistan Muslim League (N)
- Relatives: Nisar Ahmed Cheema (brother)

Iftikhar Ahmad Cheema (Urdu: افتخار احمد چیمہ; 1 January 1939 – 9 November 2025) was a Pakistani politician who served as a member of the National Assembly of Pakistan, from June 2008 to May 2018. He was a judge of the Lahore High Court.

== Early life ==
The son of middle-class farmer, Cheema completed his LLB from Punjab University and started practising in Wazirabad Bar Council.

== Political career ==
Cheema was elected to the National Assembly of Pakistan as a candidate of Pakistan Muslim League (N) (PML-N) from Constituency NA-101 (Gujranwala-VII) in the 2008 Pakistani general election. He received 71,792 votes and defeated Hamid Nasir Chattha.

He was re-elected to the National Assembly as a candidate of the PML-N from Constituency NA-101 (Gujranwala-VII) in the 2013 Pakistani general election. He received 99,924 votes and defeated Muhammad Ahmed Chattha, a candidate of Pakistan Muslim League (J).

== Death ==
Cheema died on 9 November 2025, at the age of 86.
