= Khursheed Marker =

Pakistani politician

Minister of Water and Power
- In office 18 August 1993 – 19 October 1993
- President: Wasim Sajjad
- Prime Minister: Moeenuddin Ahmad Qureshi (caretaker)

Personal details
- Born: 21 November 1925 Quetta, British India
- Died: 11 December 2010 (aged 85) Karachi, Pakistan
- Relations: Jamsheed Marker (brother)

Khursheed KA Marker (21 November 1925 – 11 December 2010) was a Pakistani businessman and former caretaker minister. He was the Minister of Water and Power in Qureshi caretaker ministry in 1993.

== Early life and education ==
Marker was born in Quetta on 21 November 1925. He received his early education from The Doon School in the Indian state of Uttarakhan. He then completed his graduation from the University of Cambridge.
