= Abdul Rashid Bhatti =

Pakistani Politician

Abdul Rashid Bhatti (born 11 September 1958) is a Pakistani politician who served twice as a member of the Provincial Assembly of Punjab.

== Early life and education ==
Abdul Rashid Bhatti was born on 11 September 1958, in Lahore, the son of Muhammad Bashir Bhatti.

He obtained the degree of M.Sc. (Geology) in 1979 from University of the Punjab, Lahore.

== Political career ==
He was elected as Member District Council Lahore (Councillor) in 1991 Punjab Local Body election.

He was elected to the Provincial Assembly of Punjab in 1993 Pakistani general election. He was re-elected to the Punjab Assembly in 2002 Pakistani general election, representing the Pakistan People's Party (PPP). He subsequently joined the Pakistan Tehreek-e-Insaf (PTI) seeking intra-party pre-selection ahead of the 2008 Pakistani general election, he subsequently left the PTI and re-joined the PPP.

In June 2021, it was reported that he would re-join the PTI.
