= Abdul Shakurul Salam =

Pakistani jurist

Federal Ombudsman of Pakistan
- In office 1995–1996

Federal Minister for Law, Justice and Parliamentary Affairs and Religious & Minorities Affairs
- In office 1 August 1993 – 18 October 1993
- Prime Minister: Moeenuddin Ahmad Qureshi

Chief Justice of the Lahore High Court
- In office 1988–1989
- Preceded by: Ghulam Mujaddid Mirza
- Succeeded by: Rafiq Tarar

Justice of the Supreme Court of Pakistan
- In office December 1989 – 31 March 1993

Personal details
- Born: April 1, 1928
- Died: February 24, 2016 (aged 87)
- Profession: Jurist

Abdul Shakurul Salam (1 April 1928 – 24 February 2016) was a jurist who served as chief justice of the Lahore High Court, and a judge of the Supreme Court of Pakistan. He later served as federal minister for law, justice and parliamentary affairs and religious and minorities affairs in the 1993 caretaker government, and as the Federal Ombudsman of Pakistan.

== Career ==
Salam practised law for 18 years and was a member of the Punjab Bar Council from 1959 to 1972. He was elevated as an additional judge of the Lahore High Court on 2 October 1974. During his judicial career, he also served as Custodian of Evacuee Property, Punjab, and as chairman of the Provincial Zakat Council from 1982 to 1988.

He was appointed chief justice of the Lahore High Court in 1988 and was elevated to the Supreme Court of Pakistan in December 1989, from where he retired on 31 March 1993. Salam also acted as governor of Punjab for a brief period during his judicial career.

In the caretaker government of Moeen Qureshi, Salam served as federal minister for law, justice and parliamentary affairs and religious and minorities affairs from 1 August to 18 October 1993. On 28 March 1995, he was sworn in as the Wafaqi Mohtasib (Federal Ombudsman) of Pakistan. During his tenure, he was elected director representing Asia on the board of directors of the International Ombudsman Institute in 1995 and organised a Conference of Asian Ombudsmen in April 1996.
