= Chief Minister of Punjab =

Chief Minister of Punjab may refer to:

- Chief Minister of Punjab (India)
- Chief Minister of Punjab (Pakistan)
