= Muhammad Ahmed Chattha =

Member of the National Assembly of Pakistan from Wazirabad (2024–2029)

- محمد احمد چٹھہ

Member of the National Assembly of Pakistan
- In office 29 February 2024 – 28 July 2025
- Succeeded by: Bilal Farooq Tarar
- Constituency: NA-66 Wazirabad

Personal details
- Party: PTI (2016-present)
- Parent: Hamid Nasir Chattha (father)

Muhammad Ahmed Chattha (Urdu: محمد احمد چٹھہ) is a Pakistani politician who had been a member of the National Assembly of Pakistan from February 2024 to July 2025.

He was de-seated by Election Commission of Pakistan (ECP).

== Political career ==
Chattha contested the 2013 Pakistani general election from NA-101 Gujranwala-VII as a candidate of Pakistan Muslim League (J) (PML(J)), but was unsuccessful. He received 59,878 votes and was defeated by Iftikhar Cheema, a candidate of Pakistan Muslim League (N) (PML(N)), who polled 99,924 votes.

He contested a 2016 by-election from NA-101 Gujranwala-VII as a candidate of Pakistan Tehreek-e-Insaf (PTI), but was unsuccessful. He received 81,218 votes and was again defeated by Iftikhar Cheema, a candidate of PML(N).

He contested the 2018 Pakistani general election from NA-79 Gujranwala-I as a candidate of PTI, but was unsuccessful. He received 118,709 votes and was defeated, this time by Nisar Ahmed Cheema, a candidate of PML(N).

He was elected to the National Assembly of Pakistan in the 2024 Pakistani general election from NA-66 Wazirabad as a PTI-backed Independent candidate. He received 160,676 votes while the runner-up Nisar Ahmed Cheema, a candidate of PML(N), received 100,633 votes.

He later joined the Sunni Ittehad Council (SIC), along with all of the other PTI-affiliated independents. Election Commission of Pakistan has disqualied him as member national assembly on 28 july 2025 due to his conviction in 9 may cases.
