= Mansoor Hayat Khan =

Pakistani politician

Member of the National Assembly of Pakistan
- In office 29 October 2018 – 17 January 2023
- Constituency: NA-63 (Rawalpindi-VII)

Personal details
- Born: Rawalpindi, Punjab, Pakistan
- Party: JUI (F) (2025-present)
- Other political affiliations: IPP (2023-2025); PTI (2018-2023)
- Parent: Ghulam Sarwar Khan (father)
- Relatives: Ammar Siddique Khan (cousin)

Mansoor Hayat Khan is a Pakistani politician who had been a member of the National Assembly of Pakistan from October 2018 till January 2023. He was the son of Ghulam Sarwar Khan.

== Political career ==
Khan was elected to the National Assembly of Pakistan as a candidate of Pakistan Tehreek-e-Insaf (PTI) from Constituency NA-63 (Rawalpindi-VII) in the 2018 Pakistani by-elections held on 14 October 2018.
