= Ammar Siddique Khan =

Pakistani politician

Member of the Provincial Assembly of the Punjab
- In office 15 August 2018 – 14 January 2023
- Constituency: PP-19 Rawalpindi-XIV

Personal details
- Born: 7 July 1990 (age 36) Rawalpindi, Punjab, Pakistan
- Party: JIP (2025-present)
- Other political affiliations: IPP (2023-2025); PTI (2018-2023)
- Relations: Ghulam Sarwar Khan (uncle); Mansoor Hayat Khan (cousin)

Ammar Siddique Khan is a Pakistani politician who had been a member of the Provincial Assembly of the Punjab from August 2018 till January 2023.

== Early life and education ==
Born on 7 July 1990 in Rawalpindi, he belongs to a political family, as his father Muhammad Siddique Khan and his uncles Muhammad Shafique Khan and Ghulam Sarwar Khan are all active in politics.

He earned his B.Sc (Hons) from the Brunel University London, UK.

== Political career ==
He was elected to the Provincial Assembly of the Punjab as a candidate of the Pakistan Tehreek-e-Insaf (PTI) from PP-19 Rawalpindi-XIV in the 2018 Punjab provincial election.
