= Sheikh Manzoor Elahi =

Pakistani politician

Sheikh Manzoor Elahi was a Pakistani politician who served as the Caretaker Chief Minister of Punjab, Pakistan from July 19th, 1993 to October 20th 1993.
