= Ghulam Mujaddid Mirza =

Pakistani jurist

Mr. Justice Ghulam Mujaddid Mirza
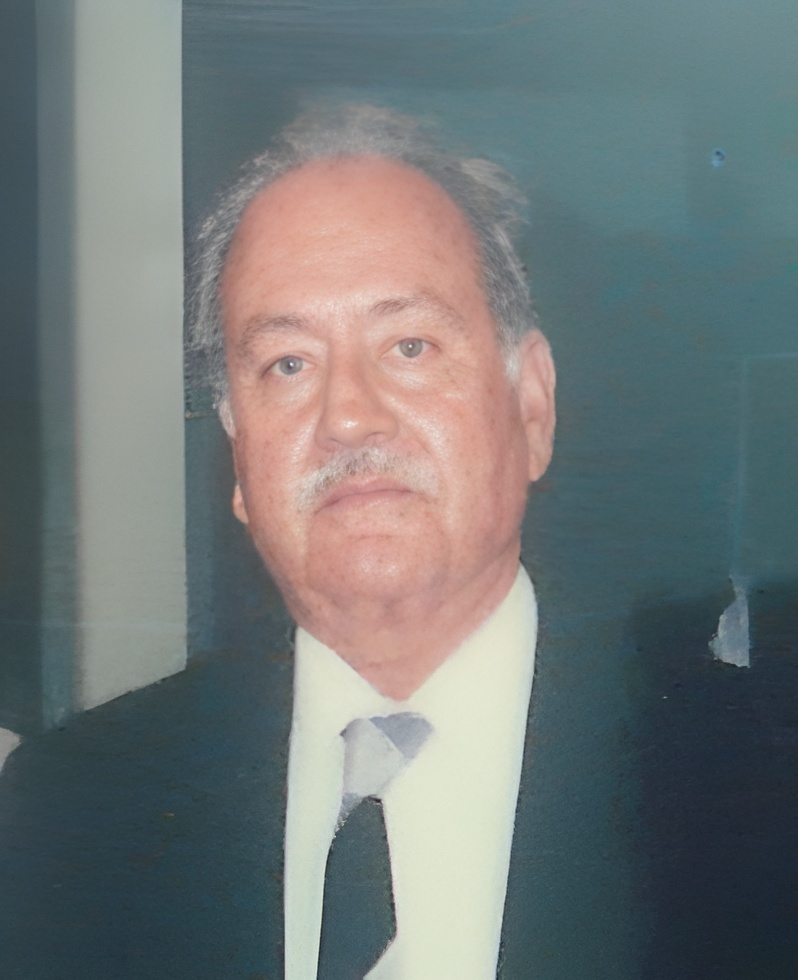
- Chief Justice of Lahore High Court, former judge Supreme Court of Pakistan

Senior Justice of the Supreme Court of Pakistan
- In office 25 March 1987 – 31 March 1990

Chief Justice of the Lahore High Court, Justice Supreme Court of Pakistan
- In office 1986–1988

Personal details
- Born: 1925
- Died: 23 May 2005 (aged 79–80) Lahore, Punjab, Pakistan
- Parent(s): Khan Bahadur Mian Abdul Rab, Districts and Sessions Judge, Chairman of the Public Service Commission Pakistan
- Profession: Jurist, President Lahore High Court Bar Association, Chief Justice Lahore High Court, Justice Supreme Court of Pakistan, Chief Ehtesab Commissioner, Interim Governor of Punjab

Mr. Justice Ghulam Mujaddid Mirza (1925 – 23 May 2005) was a Pakistani jurist who served as chief justice of the Lahore High Court and later as a judge of the Supreme Court of Pakistan.

== Career ==
Mirza was enrolled as an advocate of the Lahore High Court in 1950. He joined Lincoln's Inn in 1954, was called to the Bar in 1959, and then resumed legal practice at the Lahore High Court.

He served as a member of the West Pakistan Election Tribunal from 1964 to 1965 and was elected president of the Lahore High Court Bar Association for 1972–1973. In 1973, he was appointed an additional judge of the Lahore High Court, becoming a permanent judge in 1975.

Mirza became chief justice of the Lahore High Court in 1986. He served as a judge of the Supreme Court of Pakistan form 31 March 1987 and 31 March 1990.

Justice Mirza also served as acting Governor of Punjab during the tenure of Sajjad Hussain Qureshi.

Justice Mirza was appointed the Chief Ehtesab Commissioner of Pakistan by caretaker Prime Minister Malik Meraj Khalid in November 1996. This appointment was made under the newly enacted "Ehtesab Ordinance" of 1996.

Justice Mirza oversaw investigations into prominent leaders across the political spectrum. His office famously scrutinized numerous cases against former Prime Minister Nawaz Sharif (ranging from the non-declaration of personal assets to illegal appointments in Pakistan International Airlines), as well as corruption references against Benazir Bhutto and Asif Ali Zardari.

In April 2003, Mirza was appointed chairman of the Al-Mizan Foundation, a body concerned with the welfare of serving and retired judges and their dependents.
