= Nisar Ahmed Cheema =

Pakistani politician

Member of the National Assembly of Pakistan
- In office 13 August 2018 – 10 August 2023
- Constituency: NA-79 (Gujranwala-I)

Personal details
- Born: Wazirabad, Pakistan
- Party: AP (2025–present)
- Other political affiliations: PMLN (2018–2025)
- Relatives: Iftikhar Cheema (brother); Zulfiqar Ahmad Cheema (brother)

Nisar Ahmed Cheema is a Pakistani politician who had been a member of the National Assembly of Pakistan from August 2018 till August 2023.

== Early and personal life ==
Born in Wazirabad, Cheema served as Director General Health Services Punjab.

He is the brother of Iftikhar Cheema and Zulfiqar Ahmad Cheema.

== Political career ==
He was elected to the National Assembly of Pakistan as a candidate of Pakistan Muslim League (N) (PML-N) from Constituency NA-79 (Gujranwala-I) in the 2018 Pakistani general election. He received 142,545 votes and defeated Muhammad Ahmed Chattha, a candidate of Pakistan Tehreek-e-Insaf.
