= Rehm Dil Bhatti =

Pakistani army officer and federal minister

Federal Minister for Defence Production
- In office 1 August 1993 – 30 September 1993
- Prime Minister: Moeen Qureshi

Military service
- Allegiance: Pakistan
- Branch/service: Pakistan Army
- Rank: Lieutenant general

Rehm Dil Bhatti was a Pakistani retired military officer who served as federal minister for defence production in the caretaker government of Moeen Qureshi in 1993. He was among the senior lieutenant generals superseded when Abdul Waheed Kakar was appointed chief of army staff in January 1993.

== Military career ==
In August 1988, Bhatti was serving as Inspector General Training and Evaluation in the Pakistan Army. He narrowly avoided boarding the Lockheed C-130 Hercules, operated by the Pakistan Air Force, that crashed, killing President Zia-ul-Haq.

Following the death of General Asif Nawaz Janjua in January 1993, Bhatti was one of the senior lieutenant generals in line for the army leadership. Prime Minister Nawaz Sharif instead appointed General Abdul Waheed Kakar as chief of army staff, superseding Bhatti and three other lieutenant generals.

== Caretaker minister ==
During the caretaker administration of Moeen Qureshi, Bhatti served as federal minister for defence production from 1 August 1993 to 30 September 1993.
