= D. K. Riyaz Baloch =

Pakistani physician, civil servant, and academic administrator

Personal details
- Born: 1929
- Died: 16 January 2025 (aged 95–96) Karachi, Sindh, Pakistan
- Citizenship: Pakistan
- Profession: Physician

Dara Khan Riyaz Baloch (1929 – 16 January 2025) was a Pakistani physician, civil servant, educationist, and academic administrator who served as vice chancellor of the University of Balochistan. He also served as a federal minister in a caretaker setup and held senior public-sector posts including secretary health in Balochistan, principal of Bolan Medical College, and chairman of the Balochistan Public Service Commission.

== Career ==
Baloch retired from government service in 1989. During his public service career, he served as secretary health in Balochistan, principal of Bolan Medical College, and chairman of the Balochistan Public Service Commission. He later served as vice chancellor of the University of Balochistan.

In 1993, Baloch served as a caretaker federal minister during Moeen Qureshi ministry.
