= Second Nawaz Sharif government =

Government of Pakistan (1997–1999)

Second Nawaz Sharif Government
- 36th Cabinet of Pakistan

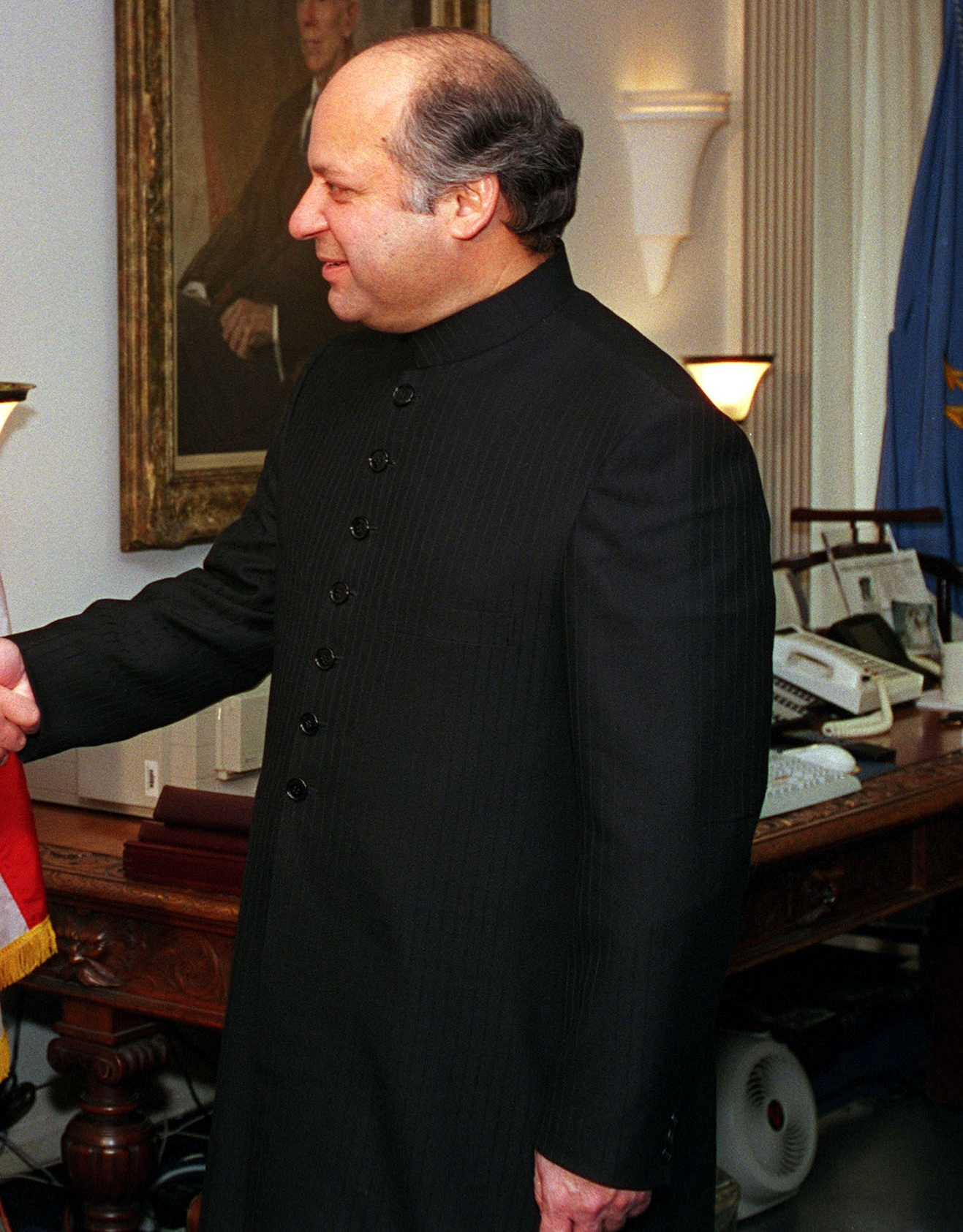
- Date formed: 1997
- Date dissolved: 1999

People and organisations
- Head of state: Rafiq Tarar
- Head of government: Nawaz Sharif
- Member party: Pakistan Muslim League (N)
- Status in legislature: Majority (2/3 Maj.)
- Opposition party: Pakistan Peoples Party
- Opposition leader: Benazir Bhutto

History
- Incoming formation: Khalid caretaker government
- Predecessor: Second Benazir Bhutto government

The Second Nawaz Sharif government began on 3 February 1997, when Nawaz Sharif was sworn in as the Prime Minister of Pakistan, and ended with a coup on 12 October 1999. Sharif, a conservative politician who presided the Pakistan Muslim League from Punjab, took the office following a decisive victory in the primary elections held in 1997 over the Pakistan Peoples Party– a left-leaning political party. The second administration of Sharif ended with the precedence of Musharraf administration in 1999 when the military took over the control of the federal government and imposed martial law for the 4th time in the country’s history.

== Government ==
=== Legislature ===
The government tenured over the 11th National Assembly of Pakistan which had its members elected in the 1997 Pakistani general election. The National Assembly was composed of an overwhelming majority support to the Nawaz Sharif government, while the Peoples Party opposition led by Benazir Bhutto formed a weak minority opposition of only 18 seats compared to the PML-N’s 135. Elahi Bux Soomro was elected the 16th Speaker of the National Assembly as a candidate for the ruling PML-N.

=== Judicial ===
The Chief Justice of Pakistan from December 1997 to 1999 would be Ajmal Mian, a jurist and judge.

== Cabinet ==
=== Federal Ministers ===
- Ishaq Dar
- Sartaj Aziz
- Gohar Ayub Khan
- Shujaat Hussain
- Syeda Abida Hussain
- Nisar Ali Khan
- Muhammad Azam Khan Hoti
- Sheikh Rashid Ahmed
- Syed Ghous Ali Shah
- Makhdoom Muhammad Javed Hashmi
- Raja Nadir Pervaiz Khan
- Malik Abdul Majeed
- Sardar Muhammad Yaqub Khan Nasar
- Mian Muhammad Yaseen Khan Wattoo
- Mian Abdul Sattar Laleka
- Raja Mohammad Zafar-ul-Haq
- Khalid Maqbool Siddiqui
- Mushahid Hussain Syed
- Khalid Anwar

=== State Ministers ===
- Asghar Ali Shah
- Syed Ahmed Mehmud
- Muhammad Siddique Khan Kanju
- Haleem Ahmed Siddiqui
- Tahmina Daultana
