= Moazzam Jahanzeb Wattoo =

Pakistani politician

Moazzam Jahanzeb Ahmad Khan Wattoo

Member of the Provincial Assembly of the Punjab
- In office 1997–1999

Personal details
- Relations: Manzoor Wattoo (father); Khurram Jahangir Wattoo (brother)

Moazzam Jahanzeb Ahmad Khan Wattoo is a Pakistani politician who was a Member of the Provincial Assembly of the Punjab, from 1997 to 1999.

== Early life ==
He was born in Okara to the former Chief Minister of the Punjab Manzoor Wattoo.
