= Khurram Jahangir Wattoo =

Pakistani politician

Mian Khurram Jehangir Wattoo

Member of the Provincial Assembly of the Punjab
- In office August 2013 – 31 May 2018
- Constituency: Wasawewala, District Okara

Personal details
- Born: 25 February 1976 (age 50) Okara, Punjab, Pakistan
- Other political affiliations: Pakistan Peoples Party
- Relatives: Manzoor Wattoo (father); Moazzam Jahanzeb Wattoo (brother)

Mian Khurram Jahangir Wattoo is a Pakistani politician who was a Member of the Provincial Assembly of the Punjab, from August 2013 to May 2018 and a member of the National Assembly of Pakistan from 2012 to 2013.

== Early life ==
He was born on 25 February 1976 in Okara to former Chief Minister of the Punjab Manzoor Wattoo.

== Political career ==
He was elected to the National Assembly of Pakistan as a candidate of Pakistan Peoples Party (PPP) from Constituency NA-147 (Okara-V) in by-polls held in 2012. He received 79,195 votes and defeated an independent candidate, Muhammad Zafar Yasin Wattoo.

He was elected to the Provincial Assembly of the Punjab as a candidate of PPP from Constituency PP-193 (Okara-IX) in by-polls held in August 2013.
