= Mian Muhammad Afzal Hayat =

Former Caretaker Chief Minister of Punjab

Chief Minister of Punjab
- Caretaker
- In office 16 November 1996 – 20 February 1997
- Preceded by: Manzoor Wattoo
- Succeeded by: Shehbaz Sharif
- Constituency: Gujrat-III

Personal details
- Died: 3 December 2020 Kolian Shah Hussain, Pakistan
- Citizenship: Pakistani
- Party: Pakistan Tehreek-e-Insaf

Mian Muhammad Afzal Hayat (died 3 December 2020) was a Pakistani politician who was an MPA of the Punjab Assembly, he served as the Minister of local government of Punjab, Minister of Education of Punjab, Leader of the opposition of Punjab, Chairman Public Account Committee Punjab, Minister of Law Punjab, Ambassador of Qatar and was Caretaker Chief Minister of Punjab from 1996 to 1997. He was also the president of Acoba in Aitchison College.

He was educated at Forman Christian College and Aitchison College.

Hayat died on 3 December 2020 in his hometown of Kolian Shah Hussain in Kharian Tehsil.

Political offices Chief Minister of Punjab
| Preceded by Manzoor Wattoo | Caretaker; 16 November 1996 – 20 February 1997 | Succeeded by Shehbaz Sharif |
