= Pakistan Muslim League – Quaid =

Pakistani political party

Pakistan Muslim League – Quaid پاکستان مسلم لیگ – ق
- Abbreviation: PML–Q
- Leader: Shujaat Hussain
- Secretary-General: Muhammad Tariq Hassan
- Founders: Mian Muhammad Azhar; Shujaat Hussain
- Founded: July 20, 2002; 24 years ago
- Split from: PML–N
- Youth wing: PML–Q Youth Wing
- Minorities wing: PML–Q Minorities Wing
- Ideology: Conservatism (Pakistani); Moderate conservatism Pakistani nationalism Economic liberalism Third Way
- Political position: Centre-right
- National affiliation: PDM
- Colors: Lime
- Slogan: Live, let live... Giving hope to the hopeless
- Senate: 1 / 96
- National Assembly: 5 / 336
- Punjab Assembly: 10 / 371

Election symbol
- Tractor

Party flag

Website
- Official website

The Pakistan Muslim League – Quaid (PML–Q) (Note: Urdu: پاکستان مسلم لیگ – ق; Pākistān Muslim Līg (Qāf), Acronyms: PML(Q), PML-Q, PMLQ, "Q League" (officially registered as the Pakistan Muslim League)) is a Pakistani political party with a centre-right position. It has a representation of five seats in the National Assembly and one in the Senate and is a part of the federal coalition government led by the Pakistan Muslim League – N (PML–N) under Prime Minister Shehbaz Sharif. The Q in its name stands for Quaid-e-Azam or Muhammad Ali Jinnah, the founder of Pakistan.

Its leadership and members were once part of the PML–N or Pakistan People's Party (PPP) presided by former prime minister Nawaz Sharif and Asif Ali Zardari. After the 1997 general elections, political differences arose that ultimately led to the creation of a faction inside of the party. The dissidents, led by Shujaat Hussain, called for strong and vocal support for the 1999 military coup d'état staged and led by then-Chief of Army Staff and Chairman of the Joint Chiefs of Staff Committee General Pervez Musharraf. In 2002, dissident leaders launched the party, focused on President Pervez Musharraf's government. It later became an integral part of Musharraf's government and appointed their own prime minister, Shaukat Aziz. Shujaat Hussain was named party president, and the party's focus turned to drawing in PML–N voters. Further advantage was taken by Musharraf, who granted opportunities to the party with a goal of exclusive support of the government and to diminish the public support of Sharif. It previously served as an ally of former prime minister Raja Pervez Ashraf and former prime minister Imran Khan's government, and led a joint election campaign in 2013, 2018, 2024 alongside the Pakistan People's Party (PPP) and the Pakistan Tehreek-e-Insaf (PTI) in Punjab and Balochistan against its rival PML–N.

The emergence of PML–N as the largest opposition party after the 2008 elections led to a significant collapse of PML–Q's influence. The party suffered many setbacks thereafter when its membership began to disintegrate after forming a separate bloc with close association with the PML–N, including the Like-Minded and Awami League blocs and second, the former president's bloc. Senior members joined PML–N, while the junior leadership defected to the Pakistan Tehreek-e-Insaf (PTI). PML–Q has a moderate conservative ideology.

In September 2010, PML–Q joined the similar ideological faction, PML-F, forming the Pakistan Muslim League (Pir Pagara), but this was short-lived when in May 2011 the party joined the Yousaf Raza Gillani led-government to fulfill the gap left by its rival PML–N. However, the party announced its resignation from the Parliament, citing the failure of the Pakistan People's Party to resolve the energy crisis as the reason.

== History ==
The founder of PML Qis Mian Muhammad Azhar. It attracted influential members such as the Chaudhary's of the Gujrat, Pervaiz Elahi, and Chaudhary Shujaat Hussain. Almost 75% of its elected members are former "big men" of the Zia ul Haq and Nawaz Sharif governments. PML–N factions broke away in 2001 under NAB's pressure to form PML (Q). They were staunch Musharraf supporters and consider him their mentor. Although, he was sometimes mistakenly cited as a member, he was never part of the party.

=== Split from PML–N ===
PML–Q started as a small group of half a dozen like-minded people in the Nawaz Sharif-led faction of PML–N, including Azhar, Khurshid Kasuri, Syeda Abida Hussain and her husband Syed Fakhar Imam. Azhar remained party president initially before he joined Pakistan Tehreek-e-Insaf. Musharraf asked Chaudhry Shujaat Hussain and Chaudhry Pervez Elahi to "galvanise and reinvent the Muslim League". Several well known leaders later joined the PML (Q) while Chaudhry Shujaat Hussain was president. PML–Q launched on 20 August 2002.

== Ideology and vision ==
The PML–Q is usually associated with conservatism and Pakistani nationalism and its stated priorities continue to include transforming Pakistan into a welfare state. The PML–Q also believes in promoting Islamizaton within minority rights and egalitarian values, establishing a conservative democracy, and maintaining a strong relationship between the civilians and the military establishment.

== 2002 general elections ==
During the 20 October 2002 legislative elections, the party won 25.7% votes and 126 out of 342 members.

== United PML ==
In May 2004, various PML factions and other political parties merged with PML–Q to form a united Pakistan Muslim League (PML), thus leaving out only the Nawaz Sharf-led faction. They included former President Farooq Leghari's Millat Party, Jahan Zaib Awan, National Peoples Party, Arbab Ghulam Rahim's Sindh Democratic Alliance, Hamid Nasir Chattha's PML (Junejo), Pir Pagara's PML (Functional), Manzoor Wattoo's PML (Jinnah), and Ijaz-ul-Haq's PML (Zia). Later on, the Pir Pagara led faction called the PML-Functional again parted ways with the united PML, which reduced the number of parties called Pakistan Muslim League to three: PML–Q, PML–N and PML-F.

== 2008 general elections ==
The Pakistan Muslim League (Q) contested the February 2008 legislative election with other allied parties including Muttahida Qaumi Movement, Pakistan Muslim League (F), and National Peoples Party. It was believed that the party wanted former Punjab Chief Minister Chaudhry Pervaiz Elahi to become prime minister. The PML (Q) lost major parliamentarians in the 2008 election, gaining only 49 elected seats, defeated by the Pakistan Peoples Party (PPP) and the PML (N).

== 2013 general elections ==
PML (Q) contested the 2013 election in alliance with PPP. The party won only two seats in national assembly, along with eight seats in Punjab assembly and four seats in Balochistan assembly. In Sindh and KPK assemblies, they were shut out, cadging only 3.11% of popular vote, relegating it from number two to number six in terms of votes.

== 2018 general elections ==
PML (Q) contested the 2018 election. The party won five seats in national assembly, along with ten seats in Punjab assembly, and one seat in KPK assembly.

== Electoral history ==
=== National Assembly elections ===
Election	Presiding chair of the party	Votes	%	Seats	+/–	Result
2002	Chaudhry Shujaat Hussain	7,500,797	25.66%	105 / 342	▲105	Coalition Government
2008	Chaudhry Shujaat Hussain	7,962,473	22.97%	54 / 342	▼51	Opposition (till 25 June 2012)
2008	Chaudhry Shujaat Hussain	7,962,473	22.97%	54 / 342	▼51	Coalition Partner (from 25 June 2012)
2013	Chaudhry Shujaat Hussain	1,409,905	3.11%	2 / 342	▼52	Opposition
2018	Chaudhry Shujaat Hussain	1,017,408	2.97%	5 / 342	▲3	Coalition Partner (till 11 April 2022)
2018	Chaudhry Shujaat Hussain	1,017,408	2.97%	5 / 342	▲3	Opposition (from 11 April 2022)

- PML–Q later formed a coalition with ruling PPP in 2012.
- In 2018, PML–Q formed a coalition with ruling Pakistan Tehreek-e-Insaf.

=== Senate elections ===
Election	Presiding chair of the party	Votes	%	Seats	+/–	Result
2006	Chaudhry Shujaat Hussain	-	-	20 / 100	▲20	Coalition Government
2009	Chaudhry Shujaat Hussain	-	-	21 / 100	▲1	Opposition
2012	Chaudhry Shujaat Hussain	-	-	4 / 100	▼17	Coalition Government
2021	Chaudhry Shujaat Hussain	-	-	1 / 100	▲1	Coalition Government

- No member of PML–Q was elected as Senator in 2015 and 2018.

=== Punjab Assembly elections ===
Election	Presiding chair of the party	Votes	%	Seats	+/–	Result
2002	Chaudhry Shujaat Hussain	6,144,813	33.33%	129 / 297	▲129	Government
2008	Chaudhry Shujaat Hussain	5,837,922	28.21%	79 / 371	▼50	Opposition
2013	Chaudhry Shujaat Hussain	1,377,130	4.94%	8 / 371	▼71	Opposition
2018	Chaudhry Shujaat Hussain	392,419	1.19%	10 / 371	▲2	Coalition Government

=== Sindh Assembly Elections ===
Election	Presiding chair of the party	Votes	%	Seats	+/–	Result
2002	Chaudhry Shujaat Hussain	543,590	9%	11 / 130	▲11	Coalition Government
2008	Chaudhry Shujaat Hussain	1,098,754	12.91%	9 / 130	▼2	Opposition
2013	Chaudhry Shujaat Hussain	1,377,130	4.94%	1 / 130	▼8	Opposition
2018	Chaudhry Shujaat Hussain	-	-	0 / 130	▼1	-

=== Balochistan Assembly elections ===
Election	Presiding chair of the party	Votes	%	Seats	+/–	Result
2002	Chaudhry Shujaat Hussain	219,026	19.30%	11 / 51	▲11	Government
2008	Chaudhry Shujaat Hussain	437,719	33.05%	16 / 50	▲5	Opposition
2013	Chaudhry Shujaat Hussain	53,297	4.15%	5 / 50	▼11	Opposition*
2018	Chaudhry Shujaat Hussain	-	-	0 / 51	▼5	-

- In March 2018, Abdul Quddus Bizenjo of PML–Q was elected as Chief Minister after a successful no-confidence motion against then-CM Sana Ullah Zehri of PML–N.

=== Khyber Pakhtunkhwa Assembly elections ===
Election	Presiding chair of the party	Votes	%	Seats	+/–	Result
2002	Chaudhry Shujaat Hussain	435,444	14.49%	7 / 124	▲6	Opposition
2008	Chaudhry Shujaat Hussain	440,518	12.9%	6 / 124	▼1	Opposition
2013	Chaudhry Shujaat Hussain	-	-	0 / 124	▼5	-
2018	Chaudhry Shujaat Hussain	-	-	1 / 145	▲1	Non-aligned

== 'Like-minded group' break away ==
A rift within party leadership emerged with a faction calling themselves the 'Like-minded' bloc, who opposed the Chaudhry's of Gujrat leadership bid.

The new faction announced that Hamid Nasir Chattha would be the chairman, Salim Saifullah the president, and Humayun Akhtar Khan the secretary general. Other prominent leaders to join this parallel set-up includes (former foreign ministers) Khurshid Mahmud Kasuri (appointed as chairman of the steering committee) former information and organising secretary PML–Q Azeem Chaudhary, former member National Assembly Asiya Azeem, Gohar Ayub Khan and Kashmala Tariq.

In February 2010, the mainstream PML–Q was further affected by the resignation of Muhammad Ijaz-ul-Haq, and the revival of his Pakistan Muslim League (Z) party.

== Alliances ==
Party President Chaudhry Shujaat Hussain and Chaudhry Pervaiz Elahi consistently supported Musharraf. They were faithful to the general in even the most adverse circumstances.

Shujaat Hussain's father Chaudhry Zahoor Elahi was initially a supporter of President Ayub Khan, but when Amir Mohammad Khan favoured some of his local opponents, he parted ways with Ayub's Convention Muslim League. He opposed Zulfikar Ali Bhutto and later joined Zia's government. He was killed allegedly by Al-Zulfikar organisation for his support to General Zia. After Zahoor's death, Chaudhry Shujaat Hussain continued to support Zia and his Zia-ul-Haq's. Mr. Syed Kabir Ali Wasti senior vice president and chairman media committee of PML–Q was back bone of PML–Qand remained very active in politics to make PML–Q sweep 2002 elections.As Syed Kabir Ali Wasti was formerly president of Pakistan Muslim League Qasim group and was close aide to Malik Qasim of Pakistan Muslim League-Qasim group. He supported former prime minister Benazir Bhutto but later Joined Pakistan Muslim League-Quaid-i-Azam and became Senior Vice President of the party during the government of Gen Pervez Musharraf.

However, he developed differences with the PML–Q and remained inactive in politics for some time and later supported Pakistan Tehreek-i-Insaf. Islamization policies. Once the establishment parted ways with Nawaz Sharif in 1999, Hussain and Zahoor came to the rescue of stability and saw their new party PML (Q) win the general elections of 2002. Both the Chaudhry brothers were accused of financial scandals, including the Cooperative Scandal, sugar scandal and bank loan defaults, but none of them were ever proven or even pursued by the government. Nowadays, the Q-league has been reduced to a minor party as their vote-bank has been devoured by both Pakistan Peoples Party and Pakistan Tehreek-e-Insaf.

== Party leadership ==
As of 2024, Chaudhry Shujaat Hussain is president of PML–Q. He was elected unopposed until 2026.

Prominent leaders of PML–Q are as below:

Name	Office/Designation
Shujaat Hussain	President
Ayesha Gulalai	President PML Punjab
Muhammad Tariq Hassan	Secretary General
Chaudhry Salik Hussain	Senior Vice-President

== Electoral history ==
=== National Assembly elections ===
National Assembly
Election	Party leader	Votes	%	Seats	+/–
2002	Shujaat Hussain	7,500,797	25.7%	142 / 342	▲142
2008	Shujaat Hussain	8,007,218	23.12%	60 / 341	▼78
2013	Shujaat Hussain	1,409,905	3.11%	2 / 342	▼58
2018	Shujaat Hussain	1,017,408	2.97%	5 / 342	▲3
2024	Shujaat Hussain	1,317,408	2.12%	6 / 342	▲0

== See also ==
- List of Islamic political parties
- Pakistan Muslim League (N)
- Pakistan Tehreek-e-Insaf
- Pakistan People's Party
- Awami Muslim League
- All Pakistan Muslim League
- Pakistan Muslim League (Functional)
- Pakistan Muslim League (Jinnah)
