= Malik Meraj Khalid =

Pakistani politician (1916–2003)

- ملک معراج خالد

Prime Minister of Pakistan Caretaker
- In office 5 November 1996 – 17 February 1997
- President: Farooq Leghari
- Preceded by: Benazir Bhutto
- Succeeded by: Nawaz Sharif

8th and 11th Speaker of the National Assembly
- In office 3 December 1988 – 4 November 1990
- Deputy: Ashraf Khatoon Abbasi
- Preceded by: Hamid Nasir Chattha
- Succeeded by: Gohar Ayub Khan
- In office 27 March 1977 – 5 July 1977
- Deputy: Abul Fateh
- Preceded by: Sahibzada Farooq Ali
- Succeeded by: Fakhar Imam

Chief Minister of Punjab
- In office 2 May 1972 – 12 November 1973
- Governor: Ghulam Mustafa Khar; Hanif Ramay
- Preceded by: Abdul Hamid Khan Dasti
- Succeeded by: Ghulam Mustafa Khar

Federal Minister for Law and Justice
- In office 22 October 1974 – 5 February 1976
- Prime Minister: Zulfiqar Ali Bhutto
- Preceded by: Meraj Muhammad Khan
- Succeeded by: Malik Muhammad Akhtar

Federal Minister for Food, Agriculture and under Developed areas
- In office 24 December 1971 – 1 May 1972
- President: Zulfikar Ali Bhutto
- Preceded by: Mahmoud Haroon (as Minister of Agriculture and Works)
- Succeeded by: Ghous Bakhsh Raisani

Personal details
- Born: 20 September 1916 Dera Chahal, Punjab, British India
- Died: 13 June 2003 (aged 87) Lahore, Punjab, Pakistan
- Party: Pakistan Peoples Party
- Education: Islamia College, Lahore

Malik Meraj Khalid (Note: Urdu: ملک معراج خالد) (1 February 1916 – 13 June 2003) was a Pakistani barrister, politician and Marxist philosopher who served as the caretaker prime minister of Pakistan from 1996 to 1997. He also served as the chief minister of Punjab from 1972 to 1973. He was one of the original philosophers and founders of the Pakistan Peoples Party (PPP).

Born in 1916 to a poor farming family in Punjab, he graduated in law from the Islamia College (Lahore) in 1942, starting his legal practice by establishing his own law firm in 1948. Inspired by the communist literature published in the Soviet Union, his initial public community work was aimed towards promoting literacy in his native village. In 1967, he was one of the founders of the PPP and ascended towards holding the highly important public offices. Responsible for administering and maintaining the control of the Punjab Province after the war with India in 1971, Meraj Khalid was appointed law minister in 1974 and served as the Speaker of the National Assembly in two non-consecutive terms.

However, his tough and rigorous Hard Left ideas led to developing political differences with Prime Minister Benazir Bhutto in the 1990s, by whom he was sacked in 1996 after levelling accusations against Benazir Bhutto's spouse Asif Zardari for the murder of Murtaza Bhutto. Being appointed caretaker prime minister, Meraj Khalid then worked to rally the anti–Benazir Bhutto forces, and his efforts contributed to Nawaz Sharif and the conservatives' landslide victory in the 1997 parliamentary elections.

== Early life and career beginnings ==
Malik Meraj Khalid was born in Dera Chahal, a small village near Burki in Lahore district, to a poor farming family belonging to the Awan Punjabi tribe. During his early life, he saw his family struggle with hardship to survive in the feudalism spectrum where his family grew crops for a local feudal lord who paid less than the minimum wage set by the British Indian Empire government. However, Meraj Khalid did not abandon his school, and despite the hardship, Khalid completed his high-school and later went on to work for a feudal lord who agreed to finance his education.

He was educated at Islamia College, Lahore and gained an LLB degree in 1944, from Punjab University Law College, Lahore, followed by an Associate degree in public works. In 1948, he began to practice law. He was elected to the Provincial Assembly of West Pakistan for the first time in 1965. In 1968, he joined the Pakistan Peoples Party (PPP) and was appointed President of its Lahore chapter. It was on the PPP ticket that he was successfully re-elected to the National Assembly of Pakistan in 1970.

== Statesmanship ==
Malik Meraj Khalid, famous for his gentleness and honesty, was a favourite of Zulfiqar Ali Bhutto, the flamboyant Prime Minister of Pakistan during the 1970s. It was he who played a major role in the political career of Meraj Khalid by first appointing him as his Minister for Food and Agriculture and Under-Developed Areas in December 1971. Afterwards he was appointed Chief of the Party's Parliamentary Affairs in November 1972, and Minister of Social Welfare, Local Government and Rural Development in 1975.

== Member and Speaker of National Assembly ==
After the execution of Zulfiqar Ali Bhutto in April 1979, he was nominated member of the PPP's Central Committee, but he eventually resigned from this position in January 1988. After once more successfully returning to the National Assembly in 1988, he was once again appointed Speaker of the National Assembly in 1988. However, he lost the subsequent elections in 1993, and remained aloof from politics for some time. During this period of solitude, he served as the Rector of International Islamic University in Islamabad in 1997.

== Interim Prime Minister ==
President Farooq Leghari, using the powers granted him by the Eighth Amendment to the Constitution of Pakistan, dismissed the government of Benazir Bhutto in November 1996 again, for corruption and politically motivated killings. Malik Meraj Khalid was asked to officiate the interim government before new elections, but as prime minister Meraj Khalid continued to live his simple life and his Lahore home too remained as accessible as ever.

== Death and legacy ==
Malik Meraj Khalid peacefully died on 13 June 2003 at age 87 in his residence in Lahore, and was buried with full state honours in a local cemetery. He was survived by his widow and an adopted son.

His obituary in The Guardian noted that "Meraj was perhaps the one Pakistani politician intensely engaged with community work while in high office, and whenever out of office, or out of favor with his party, he returned to grassroots activism, gaining respect and affection across the spectrum. Amid political extremists and Bonapartist generals, he was a model of reason".

== Notes ==
Political offices
Preceded by Abdul Hamid Khan Dasti	Chief Minister of Punjab; 1972–1973	Succeeded by Ghulam Mustafa Khar
Preceded by Sahibzada Farooq Ali	Speaker of National Assembly; 1977	Succeeded by Fakhar Imam
Preceded by Hamid Nasir Chattha	Speaker of National Assembly; 1988–1990	Succeeded by Gohar Ayub Khan
Preceded by Benazir Bhutto	Prime Minister of Pakistan; Caretaker; 1996–1997	Succeeded by Nawaz Sharif
