= Arif Nakai =

Pakistani politician (1930–2000)

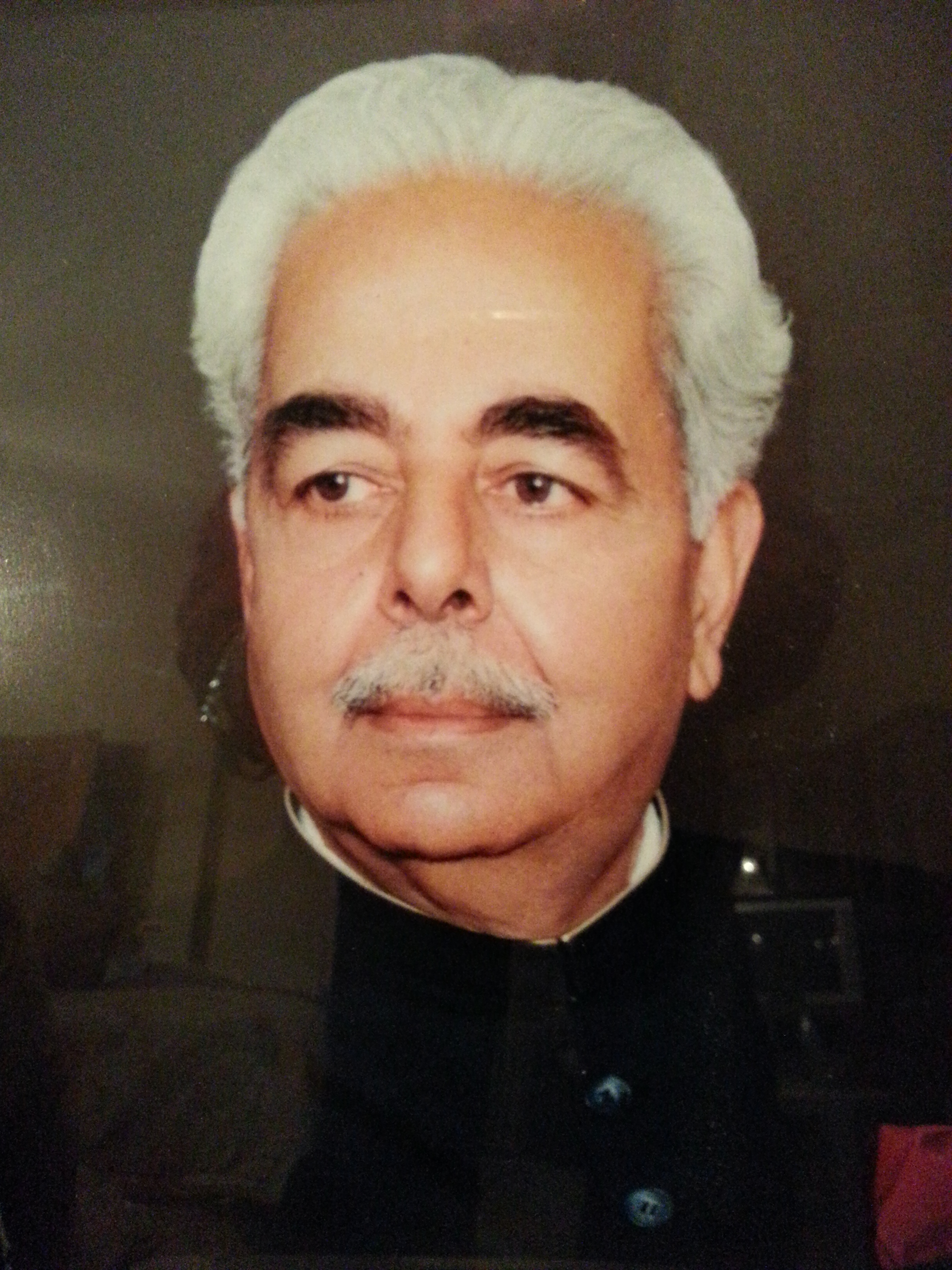

12th Chief Minister of Punjab
- In office 13 September 1995 – 3 November 1996
- Governor: Raja Saroop Khan
- Preceded by: Manzoor Wattoo
- Succeeded by: Manzoor Wattoo

Personal details
- Born: 1930 Kasur, Punjab, British India
- Died: 29 February 2000 (aged 69–70) Lahore, Punjab, Pakistan

Sardar Muhammad Arif Nakai (Note: Punjabi/Urdu: محمد عارف نکئی) (1930 – 29 February 2000) was a Pakistani politician who served as the 12th chief minister of Punjab from 1995 to 1996. He was a senior member of the Pakistan Muslim League (J).

== Early life ==
He was born into a Jat family of the Nakai Misl, one of the twelve Misls of the Sikh Confederacy. His great-grandfather, Sardar Ishar Singh Nakai, was born a Sikh and converted to Islam in 1879. Sardar Ishar Singh was the youngest son of Sardar Kahan Singh Nakai, the ruler of the Nakai Misl.

== Career ==
He was elected as a Member of the Provincial Assembly of the Punjab for four consecutive terms: from 1985 to 1988, 1988 to 1990, 1990 to 1993, and 1993 to 1996. He also served as the Minister for Revenue, Minister for Forests, Minister for Livestock & Dairy Development, Minister for Industries and Mineral Development, and as Chief Minister of Punjab from 1995 to 1996. He was the father of three sons and a daughter. All three sons, Sardar Pervaiz Hasan Nakai, Sardar Muhammad Asif Nakai, and Sardar Atif Nakai, followed in his footsteps and became politicians.

== Death ==
He died in Lahore on 29 February 2000 and was buried in his home village of Wan Adhen.

== See also ==
- Muslim Jats
- Nakai Misl
