= Chief Minister of Punjab (Pakistan) =

Head of government of Punjab, Pakistan

- وزیرِ اعلیٰ پنجاب; Wazīr-ē-Aʿlā Panjāb
- Emblem of Punjab

- Flag of Punjab

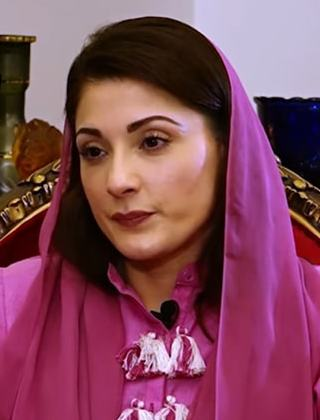
- Incumbent; Maryam Nawaz since 26 February 2024
- Executive branch of the Government of Punjab
- Style: Her Excellency
- Type: Head of government
- Status: Leader of the House
- Abbreviation: CM
- Member of: Provincial Assembly of the Punjab; Cabinet of Punjab; Council of Common Interests
- Reports to: Governor of Punjab; Provincial Assembly of the Punjab
- Residence: Chief Minister Secretariat
- Seat: Lahore
- Nominator: Members of the Punjab Assembly
- Appointer: Governor of Punjab
- Term length: *As long as confidence is commanded in the Provincial Assembly; Assembly's term is 5 years unless dissolved sooner; No term limits specified
- Constituting instrument: Article 130, Constitution of Pakistan
- Precursor: Premier of the Punjab
- Inaugural holder: Iftikhar Hussain Khan
- Formation: 15 August 1947; 79 years ago
- Deputy: Senior Minister of Punjab
- Website: cm.punjab.gov.pk

The chief minister of Punjab (Punjabi/Urdu: وزیرِ اعلیٰ پنجاب, romanised: Wazīr-ē-Aʿlā Panjāb) is the head of government of the Pakistani province of Punjab. Elected by the Provincial Assembly of the Punjab, the chief minister leads the executive branch of the government of Punjab along with their appointed cabinet, with the governor of Punjab serving as the nominal head of executive and province. The chief minister is elected by a majority in the Punjab Assembly, where they serve as leader of the House. The office is held by virtue of the officeholder's ability to command the confidence of the Assembly, with no term limits. Maryam Nawaz Sharif is the 19th and current chief minister of Punjab.

The office of Chief Minister is located in Lahore, the capital of the Punjab province and is known as the CM Secretariat.

== List of chief ministers of Punjab ==
Muslim League Pakistan Peoples Party Pakistan Muslim League (N) / Islami Jamhoori Ittehad Pakistan Muslim League (J) Pakistan Muslim League (Q) Pakistan Tehreek-e-Insaf Caretaker Governor's rule, martial law or office abolished

Tenure no.	Chief minister		Party	Term of office			Ref.
Tenure no.	Portrait	Name	Party	Took office	Left office	Time in office	Ref.
1	Portrait of Iftikhar Hussain Khan Mamdot	Iftikhar Hussain Khan Mamdot	MLP	August 15, 1947	January 25, 1949	1 year, 163 days	
–	Governor's rule			January 25, 1949	April 5, 1951	2 years, 70 days	
2	Portrait of Mumtaz Daultana	Mumtaz Daultana	MLP	April 15, 1951	April 3, 1953	1 year, 353 days	
3	Portrait of Feroz Khan Noon	Firoz Khan Noon	MLP	April 3, 1953	May 21, 1955	2 years, 48 days	
4	Portrait of Abdul Hamid Khan Dasti	Abdul Hamid Khan Dasti	MLP	May 21, 1955	October 14, 1955	146 days	
–	Office abolished			October 14, 1955	June 30, 1970	14 years, 259 days	
–	Martial-law administration			July 1, 1970	May 2, 1972	1 year, 306 days	
5		Malik Meraj Khalid	PPP	May 2, 1972	November 12, 1973	1 year, 194 days	
6		Ghulam Mustafa Khar	PPP	November 12, 1973	March 15, 1974	123 days	
7		Hanif Ramay	PPP	March 15, 1974	July 15, 1975	1 year, 122 days	
8		Sadiq Hussain Qureshi	PPP	July 15, 1975	July 5, 1977	1 year, 355 days	
–	Martial-law administration			July 5, 1977	April 9, 1985	7 years, 278 days	
9	Portrait of Nawaz Sharif	Nawaz Sharif	IJI/IND	April 9, 1985	August 6, 1990	5 years, 119 days	
10	Portrait of Ghulam Haider Wyne	Ghulam Haider Wyne	IJI	August 6, 1990	April 25, 1993	2 years, 262 days	
11	Portrait of Manzoor Ahmad Wattoo	Manzoor Wattoo (first tenure)	PML(J)	April 25, 1993	July 18, 1993	84 days	
–		Sheikh Manzoor Elahi (caretaker)	Caretaker	July 18, 1993	October 20, 1993	94 days	
12	Portrait of Manzoor Ahmad Wattoo	Manzoor Wattoo (second tenure)	PML(J)	October 20, 1993	September 13, 1995	1 year, 328 days	
13	Portrait of Muhammad Arif Nakai	Muhammad Arif Nakai	PML(J)	September 13, 1995	November 3, 1996	1 year, 51 days	
14	Portrait of Manzoor Ahmad Wattoo	Manzoor Wattoo (third tenure)	PML(J)	November 3, 1996	November 17, 1996	14 days	
–		Muhammad Afzal Hayat (caretaker)	Caretaker	November 17, 1996	February 20, 1997	95 days	
15	Portrait of Shehbaz Sharif	Shehbaz Sharif (first tenure)	PML(N)	February 20, 1997	October 12, 1999	2 years, 234 days	
–	Governor's rule			October 12, 1999	November 23, 2002	3 years, 42 days	
16	Portrait of Parvez Elahi	Parvez Elahi (first tenure)	PML(Q)	November 29, 2002	November 17, 2007	4 years, 353 days	
–		Sheikh Ijaz Nisar (caretaker)	Caretaker	November 19, 2007	April 12, 2008	145 days	
17		Dost Muhammad Khosa (interim administration)	PML(N)	April 12, 2008	June 6, 2008	55 days	
18	Portrait of Shehbaz Sharif	Shehbaz Sharif (second tenure)	PML(N)	June 8, 2008	February 25, 2009	4 years, 291 days	
18	Portrait of Shehbaz Sharif	Shehbaz Sharif (second tenure)	PML(N)	March 30, 2009	March 26, 2013	4 years, 291 days	
–	Governor's rule			February 25, 2009	March 30, 2009	33 days	
–	Portrait of Najam Sethi	Najam Sethi (caretaker)	Caretaker	March 27, 2013	June 7, 2013	72 days	
19	Portrait of Shehbaz Sharif	Shehbaz Sharif (third tenure)	PML(N)	June 7, 2013	June 7, 2018	5 years, 0 days	
–		Hasan Askari Rizvi (caretaker)	Caretaker	June 7, 2018	August 20, 2018	74 days	
20	Portrait of Usman Buzdar	Usman Buzdar	PTI	August 20, 2018	April 30, 2022	3 years, 253 days	
21	Portrait of Hamza Shahbaz	Hamza Shahbaz (Note: He continued as a trustee chief minister from 22 July 2022 while the dispute over the chief-ministerial election was before the Supreme Court.)	PML(N)	April 30, 2022	July 25, 2022	86 days	
22	Portrait of Parvez Elahi	Parvez Elahi (second tenure)	PML(Q)	July 26, 2022	January 22, 2023	180 days	
–	Portrait of Mohsin Naqvi	Mohsin Naqvi (caretaker)	Caretaker	January 22, 2023	February 25, 2024	1 year, 34 days	
23	Portrait of Maryam Nawaz	Maryam Nawaz	PML(N)	February 26, 2024	Incumbent	2 years, 263 days	

== See also ==
- Government of Pakistan
- Prime Minister of Pakistan
- Government of Punjab
- Governor of Punjab
- Chief Secretary Punjab
- Senior Minister of Punjab
- Leader of the Opposition Punjab
- Speaker of the Provincial Assembly of Punjab
- List of current Pakistani chief ministers
- List of current Pakistani governors
- Chief Minister of Khyber Pakhtunkhwa
- Chief Minister of Sindh
- Chief Minister of Balochistan
- Chief Minister of Gilgit-Baltistan
- Prime Minister of Azad Jammu and Kashmir
