= Hamid Nasir Chattha =

Pakistani politician

- حامد ناصر چٹھہ

10th Speaker of the National Assembly
- In office 31 May 1986 – 3 December 1988
- Deputy: Wazir Ahmed Jogezai
- Preceded by: Fakhar Imam
- Succeeded by: Malik Meraj Khalid

Federal Minister of Information and Broadcasting
- In office 10 April 1985 – 28 January 1986
- Prime Minister: Muhammad Khan Junejo
- Preceded by: Martial Law (Zia-ul-Haq)
- Succeeded by: Shujaat Hussain

Minister of Planning & Development
- In office 9 November 1990 – 18 April 1993
- Succeeded by: Syed Babar Ali (caretaker)

Provincial Minister of Punjab for Health & Education
- In office 1981–1985

Personal details
- Born: 15 November 1944 (age 81) Lahore, Punjab, British India (now Punjab, Pakistan)
- Party: Pakistan Tehreek-e-Insaf (2016–present)
- Other political affiliations: Pakistan Muslim League (N)(2012–2016); Pakistan Peoples Muslim League(2009-2012); Pakistan Muslim League (Q)(2006–2009); Pakistan Muslim League (J)(1988–2006); Pakistan Muslim League(1962–1988); Muslim League(Before 1962)
- Children: Muhammad Ahmed Chattha (son)
- Education: Government College University, Lahore; Inns of Court School of Law

Chaudhry Hamid Nasir Chattha (Urdu: حامد ناصر چٹھہ) is a politician from Wazirabad, Punjab, Pakistan. He was born on 15 November 1944, in Lahore. Hamid Nasir Chattha was elected as a Member of Punjab Assembly, after losing in 2008 National Assembly elections to Justice (Retd.) Iftikhar Ahmed Cheema. He was previously elected as an MNA in 1985, 1990, 1993, and 2002 from his constituency of Gujranwala.

== Early life and family ==
Hamid Nasir Chatha is the son of Ch. Salah-ud-Din Chatha. He has two sons, Fayyaz Chatha and Ahmad Chatha.

== Education and career ==
Hamid Nasir Chattha attended Aitchison College, Lahore. He received his bachelor's and master's degrees in political science from Government College Lahore in 1966. He was not able to complete his Bar-at-Law exam from Lincoln's Inn, because of his father's death.

=== Later career ===
Between 1981 and 1985 Hamid Nasir Chattha served as Provincial Minister of Punjab holding the portfolio of Health and Education. Hamid Nasir won one of the biggest majorities in the Punjab in the 1985 party-less elections. He then went on to serve as Speaker of the National Assembly from 1986 to 1988.

As a federal minister, he held the portfolio of Information and Broadcasting and Science and Technology during 1985–1986 and later the portfolio of Planning during 1990–1993. He was the chairman of the special committee of Kashmir with the status of federal minister.

He broke with the PML and IJI coalition led by Nawaz Sharif on 17 April 1993, a day before the government was dismissed by President Ghulam Ishaq Khan. He went on to join the PML-J, originally founded by the late Mohammed Khan Junejo. His party has had two chief ministers of the Punjab and one foreign minister when his party was a coalition partner with PPP-P.

Chattha retired from active politics in 2013. After a successful career in politics, he decided to step away from the political arena.

== See also ==
- Politics of Pakistan
- Manzoor Wattoo

Political offices
| Preceded by Fakhar Imam | Speaker of the National Assembly; 1986–1988 | Succeeded by Malik Meraj Khalid |
