= Manzoor Wattoo =

Pakistani politician (1939–2025)

Mian Manzoor Ahmed Wattoo
- منظور احمد وٹو
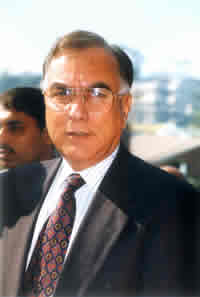

Minister for Industry and Production
- In office 2008–2013
- President: Asif Ali Zardari
- Prime Minister: Yousaf Raza Gillani; Raja Pervaiz Ashraf
- Succeeded by: Ghulam Murtaza Jatoi

11th Chief Minister of Punjab
- In office 3 November 1996 – 16 November 1996
- Governor: Raja Saroop Khan; Khalilur Rehman
- Preceded by: Arif Nakai
- Succeeded by: Mian Muhammad Afzal Hayat (caretaker)
- In office 20 October 1993 – 13 September 1995
- Governor: Iqbal Khan; Chaudhry Altaf Hussain
- Preceded by: Ghulam Haider Wyne
- Succeeded by: Arif Nakai

Personal details
- Born: 14 August 1939 Fazilka, Punjab Province, British India
- Died: 16 December 2025 (aged 86) Lahore, Punjab, Pakistan
- Party: PPP (2020–2025)
- Other political affiliations: PTI (2018–2020); PPP (2008–2018); PML(Q) (2002–2008); Pakistan Muslim League (Jinnah) (1995–2002); Pakistan Muslim League (Junejo) (1993–1995); Pakistan Muslim League (1985–1993)
- Children: Khurram Jahangir Wattoo (son); Moazzam Jahanzeb Wattoo (son); Zeeshan Wattoo (son)
- Education: Government Islamia College, Civil Lines, Lahore
- Occupation: Politician

Mian Manzoor Ahmad Wattoo (Note: Punjabi/Urdu: منظور احمد وٹو) (14 August 1939 – 16 December 2025) was a Pakistani politician. who served as Speaker and the 11th chief minister of Punjab 1993 to 1995, and in 1996. He also served as the federal minister of industry and production from 2008 to 2013.

Wattoo was first elected, in 1985, the Speaker of Provincial Assembly of the Punjab. Thrice elected to the same office, he secured the office of the Chief Minister of Punjab, Pakistan in 1993 on the ticket of Pakistan Muslim League (J), after a series of tug of war between the federal and provincial government Wattoo twice had to leave office between his term only to leave office permanently on 16 November 1996.

He formed the Pakistan Muslim League (Jinnah) in 1995 when he parted away with his prior party (then PML), but the party-PML (Jinnah), was unable to hold significant influence in national politics.

In May 2008, Wattoo along with his associates left Pakistan Muslim League (Quaid-e-Azam) and joined Pakistan Peoples Party and served as the Ministry of States and Frontier Regions, he also led Pakistan Peoples Party's provisional chapter of Punjab only to witness a complete failure in Punjab in the 2013 elections. In that election cricketer-turned politician Imran Khan's PTI had challenged Pakistan Muslim League (Nawaz) winning a few dozen seats.

Wattoo tendered his resignation soon after the elections, but he was asked to continue by PPP's Co-Chairman Asif Ali Zardari upon recommendation of PPP's Punjab Executive Committee.

== Political career ==
Mian Manzoor Ahmed Wattoo Rajput was first elected as Chairman District Council Okara in 1983 during the non-party elections of the Zia era with the guidance and support of late Abdul Shakoor Khan, a prolific and respectable personality of Haveli Lakha. Then in 1985, he secured the office of the Speaker of the Provincial Assembly of Punjab, the largest province of Pakistan on Pakistan Muslim League ticket. Thrice elected for the same office, he secured the office.

After a tug-of-war between Wattoo and Nawaz Sharif, the then restored (by Supreme Court) Prime Minister of Pakistan and head of the Pakistan Muslim League (N) (PML (N)), all assemblies were dissolved and only after a fresh election, Wattoo was elected the Chief Minister of Punjab again on PML (Junejo) ticket, ruling a coalition consisting chiefly of Pakistan People's Party (PPP), PML (Junejo), minorities, and some independents.

It was in 1995 that Wattoo formed his own PML (Jinnah), when he parted ways with Hamid Nasir Chattha who wanted to be the president of PML (Junejo), which Wattoo was previously a part of. The differences cropped up in the same year when Wattoo was removed as the Punjab Chief Minister in the power struggle between the province (headed by PML (Junejo) and the center (headed by rival PPP), leading Arif Nakai another PML (Junejo) candidate to be the new Chief Minister.

In the summer of 1995, Wattoo's father Mian Jahangir Ahmed Khan Wattoo died. Wattoo did not attend his father's funeral owing to the difference in religious ideology between a father and a son. Mian Jahangir Ahmed Khan Wattoo converted to the Ahmedi sect under the influence and training of the school headmaster of their native village, Muazzam, in Fazilka, India. Wattoo, on the other hand, took his mother's and forefather's (except father's) religion and was a Muslim.

Painted corrupt by the PPP and the PML-N, he was removed from the office of Chief Minister only to be restored to office a year later in 1996 by the High Court. Corruption allegations and court proceedings were started against Wattoo by arch rival and then Prime Minister Nawaz Sharif of the PML-N. Mian Manzoor Wattoo was sentenced by an accountability court to more than 10 years in prison besides being fined 10 million rupees, only later to be set aside in the appeals.

His daughter Rubina Shaheen Wattoo served as a member of the National Assembly of Pakistan for the PML(Q). He actively began taking part in politics and soon became a close ally of Pakistan President Pervez Musharraf. Having merged his political party, Pakistan Muslim League (Jinnah), into the ruling PML (Q) on presidential advice, he was made the Senior Vice President of the ruling party. His relations with the party's leadership remained sour from the beginning, who tried at marginalizing Wattoo and anyone associated with him.

Wattoo remained part of the part despite differences with the party leaders Chaudhry Shujaat Hussain and the Punjab Chief Minister Chaudhry Pervaiz Elahi who had previously suffered heavily under Wattoo's reign in Punjab (1993–95).

Wattoo announced to join forces with the Pakistan People's Party on 29 May 2008 along with party members in Islamabad soon after winning a decisive victory in February 2008 elections in which he won from two constituencies NA-146 and NA-147 as an independent and his daughter Rubina Shaheen Wattoo won PP-188. Wattoo served as Federal Minister for Industries and Production in the PPP government of Prime Minister Syed Yusuf Raza Gilani his portfolio was changed and he became Federal Minister for Kashmir Affairs and Northern Areas.

His son, Khurram Jahangir Wattoo, who won NA-147, after his father left his home constituency, was made the Parliamentary Secretary for Establishment and Cabinet Divisions by the PPP leadership.

== Death ==
Wattoo died in Lahore on 16 December 2025, at the age of 86.

== See also ==
- Pakistan Tehreek-e-Insaf
- Dipalpur his native village

== Notes ==
Political offices
Preceded by Ghulam Haider Wyne	Chief Minister of Punjab; 1993	Succeeded by Manzoor Elahi
Preceded by Manzoor Elahi	2nd term 1993–1995	Succeeded by Sardar Arif Nakai
Preceded by Sardar Arif Nakai	3rd time 1996	Succeeded by Mian Muhammad Afzal Hayat
