= 1997 Pakistani general election =

- 3 February 1997

All 217 seats in the National Assembly 109 seats needed for a majority
- Registered: 55,737,177
- Turnout: 35.79% (▼4.23pp)
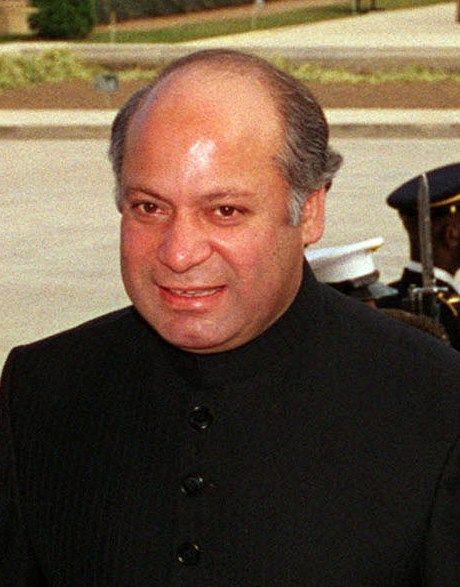

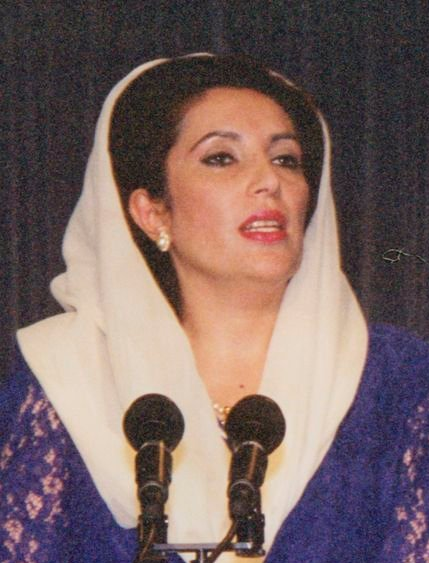
	First party	Second party
Leader	Nawaz Sharif	Benazir Bhutto
Party	PML(N)	PPP
Seats before	73	89
Seats after	137	18
Seat change	▲64	▼71
Popular vote	8,751,793	4,152,209
Percentage	44.88%	21.29%
Swing	▲5.92pp	▼15.71pp
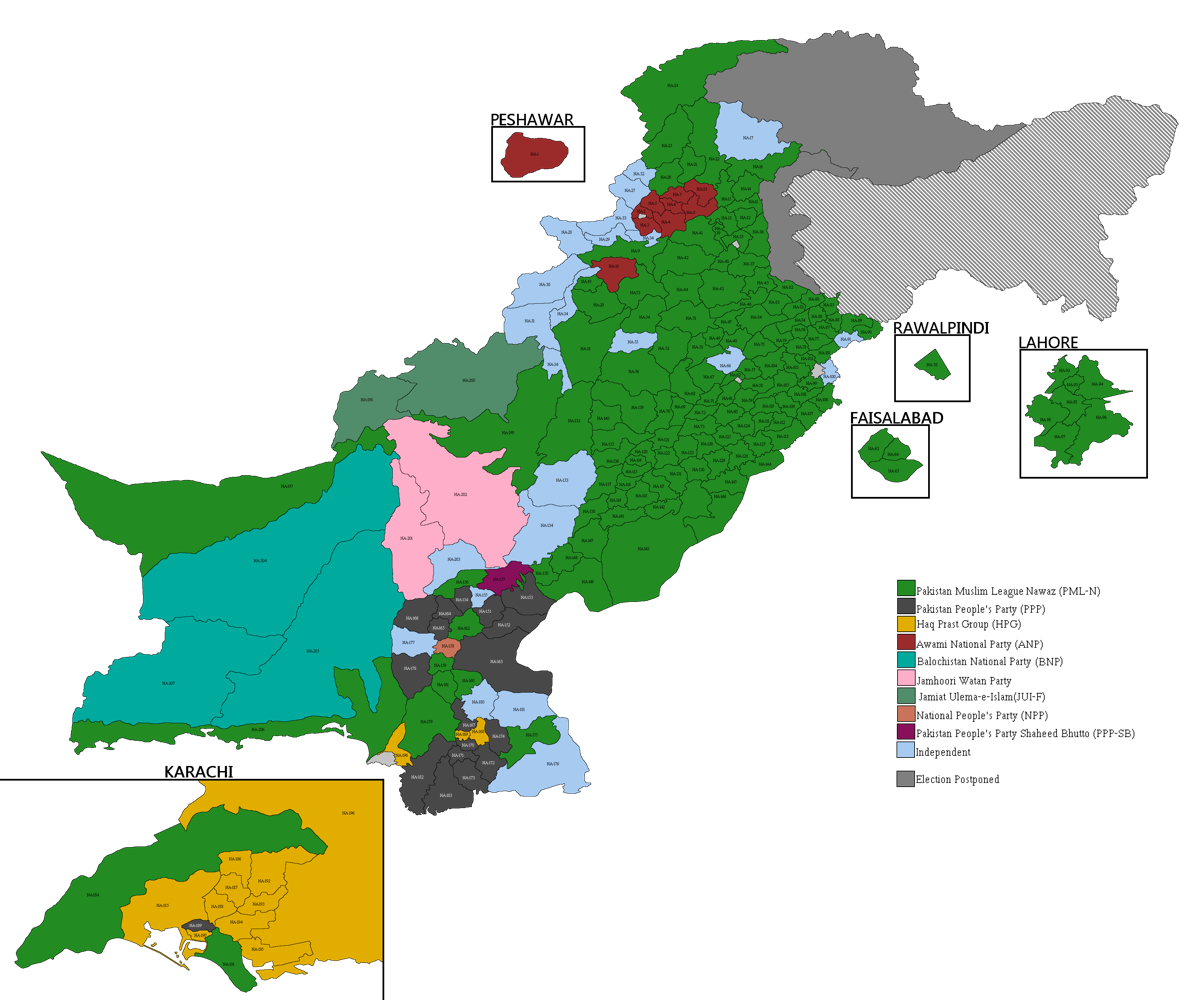
- Map of Pakistan Showing National Assembly Cosntituencies and winning Parties
Prime Minister before election
Benazir Bhutto
PPP
Elected Prime Minister
Nawaz Sharif
PML(N)

General elections were held in Pakistan on 3 February 1997 to elect the members of National Assembly. The elections were a fierce contest between Pakistan Peoples Party (PPP) led by pre-election Prime Minister Benazir Bhutto and the Pakistan Muslim League (N) led by Nawaz Sharif. Unlike the 1990 elections where Sharif won due to allegations of rigging, this time he benefited from the controversial death of Bhutto's brother Murtaza, a populist leader, a worsening economy, and alleged corruption cases against Bhutto's husband Asif Ali Zardari.

The elections took place after the previous PPP government was dismissed by President Farooq Leghari for matters of national security. Bhutto's government suffered with financial mismanagement, corruption charges, racial tensions in her native Sindh Province, issues with the judiciary, violations of the constitution, and intra-party and family feuds. After the PPP government was dismissed, a caretaker government was formed under the leadership of Malik Meraj Khalid.

The result was a landslide victory for the PML (N), which received most votes ever won by an opposition party at the time. This was the first time PML-N had won an election without being part of any alliance. Sharif subsequently became Prime Minister for a second non-consecutive term. The PPP meanwhile got wiped out, losing 71 seats and winning only 18 due to Bhutto's increasing unpopularity. Voter turnout was only 36.0%.

== Background ==
The PPP won the largest number of seats in the 1993 election and Benazir Bhutto became prime minister at the head of a coalition government. However, on 5 November 1996, President Leghari, a former ally of Bhutto, dismissed the government 2 years early for alleged corruption and abuse of power. The allegations included financial mismanagement, failing to stop police killings, destroying judicial independence and violating the constitution. A number of PPP party members were detained including Bhutto's husband Asif Ali Zardari who was accused of taking commissions for arranging official deals.

A former speaker and member of the PPP Miraj Khalid was appointed interim prime minister. The National Assembly and provincial assemblies were dissolved and elections called for 3 February 1997. Bhutto denied all the charges against herself and petitioned the Supreme Court to reverse her dismissal. However, the court ruled in January that there was sufficient evidence for the dismissal to be justified legally.

== Campaign ==
Expectations in the lead up to the election were that up to 90 people, possibly including Bhutto and Sharif, might be prevented from standing in the election due to the caretaker governments campaign against corruption. However, by the end of December 1996 the government was forced to acknowledge that they were unable to find sufficient evidence to act against leading politicians. As a result, the election once again became mainly a contest between the PPP and the PML-N.

Over 6,000 candidates stood in the election, with 1,758 standing for the National Assembly and 4,426 for the four provincial assemblies. Major campaign issues included corruption, the economy, ethnic and religious conflicts and growing terrorism. However, there was little enthusiasm for the fourth election in 8 years with polls showing only about 20% would vote. Predictions of a challenge by a new anti-corruption party, the Movement for Justice, founded by former cricketer Imran Khan, faded as Khan attempted to fend off personal attacks on PML(N) and Nawaz Sharif. Most forecasts expected Sharif's PML-N to win the election, with them drawing larger crowds than the PPP and appearing to be supported by the army. Opinion polls showed the PML-N leading the PPP by about 40% to 20%.

== Results ==
The results saw the PML-N win a landslide victory, winning by the largest margin since the 1977 election. Bhutto's PPP was routed, and came second nationally with only 18 seats, and for the first time failing to win any seats in Punjab. Khan's Movement for Justice failed to win any seats. The turnout, at around 36%, was the lowest ever in the history of elections in Pakistan. Voting in three seats was delayed; the subsequently by-elections saw two seats won by the PML(N) and one by the Awami National Party.

Party	Votes	%	Seats	+/–
Pakistan Muslim League (N)	8,751,793	44.88	135	+62
Pakistan Peoples Party	4,152,209	21.29	18	−71
Muttahida Qaumi Movement	764,207	3.92	12	New
Pakistan Muslim League (J)	624,286	3.20	0	−6
Awami National Party	357,002	1.83	9	+6
Pakistan Peoples Party (Shaheed Bhutto)	377,228	1.93	1	New
Jamiat Ulema-e-Islam (F)	325,910	1.67	2	New
Pakistan Tehreek-e-Insaf	314,820	1.61	0	New
Balochistan National Party	124,754	0.64	3	New
National Peoples Party (Khar)	85,121	0.44	1	0
Baloch National Movement	72,354	0.37	0	New
Jamhoori Wattan Party	66,128	0.34	2	0
Pashtunkhwa Milli Awami Party	58,552	0.30	0	–3
Muslim Ittehad Pakistan	49,601	0.25	0	New
Jamiat Ulema-e-Islam (S)	48,838	0.25	0	New
Pakistan Democratic Party	47,153	0.24	0	New
Pakistan Muslim League (Qayyum)	37,723	0.19	0	New
Pakistan Awami Party	31,615	0.16	0	New
30 other parties	88,429	0.45	0	–
Independents (Muslims)	2,690,164	13.80	21	+5
Non-Muslim seats	432,553	2.22	10	0
Vacant			3	–
Total	19,500,440	100.00	217	0
Valid votes	19,500,440	97.75		
Invalid/blank votes	448,829	2.25		
Total votes	19,949,269	100.00		
Registered voters/turnout	55,737,177	35.79		
Source: Nohlen et al.

== Aftermath ==
Nawaz Sharif described the results as reflecting the country's desire for an end to chaos. Benazir Bhutto had threatened to not recognise the results if the PPP lost, but despite alleging that election officials had rigged the election by filling in extra ballots, she did not call for protests, saying that Pakistan needed political stability. International observers from the European Union and the Commonwealth of Nations said the election met basic conditions but would not describe it as 'free and fair'.

=== Election for Prime Minister ===
The election for Prime Minister took place on 17 February 1997. Nawaz Sharif was confirmed as prime minister by the National Assembly receiving 177 votes against 16 for the PPP candidate Aftab Shaban Mirani. He took office on 18 February with a new cabinet named on 26 February.

119 votes required
Candidate	Party	Votes	%
Nawaz Sharif	Pakistan Muslim League (N)	177	91.71
Aftab Shaban Mirani	Pakistan Peoples Party	16	8.29
Total		193	100.00
