= Moeen Qureshi =

Pakistani-born American economist

- معین قریشی
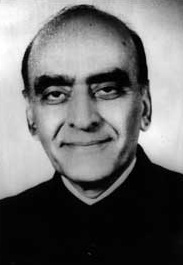

Caretaker Prime Minister of Pakistan
- In office 18 July 1993 – 19 October 1993
- President: Wasim Sajjad (Acting President)
- Preceded by: Nawaz Sharif
- Succeeded by: Benazir Bhutto

Personal details
- Born: 26 June 1930 Lahore, Punjab, British India (now in Punjab, Pakistan)
- Died: 22 November 2016 (aged 86) Washington D.C.
- Citizenship: Pakistan
- Party: Independent
- Spouse: Lilo Elizabeth Richter
- Education: Government College University; Punjab University; Indiana University Bloomington
- Profession: Civil servant, economist

Moeenuddin Ahmad Qureshi (Urdu: معین الدین احمد قریشی; 26 June 1930 – 22 November 2016) was a Pakistani American economist and civil servant who served as caretaker prime minister of Pakistan from July to October 1993. He also served as the senior vice president of World Bank.

== Early life and education ==
Moeenuddin Ahmad Qureshi was born in Lahore, Punjab, British India, on 26 June 1930. He hailed from a distinguished family that was originally from Kasur. His father, Mohyeddin Ahmad Qureshi, was a civil servant in the British government and his mother, Khursheed Jabin, was a housewife. He attended the Islamia College in Lahore and made a transfer to the Government College University in Lahore where he gained B.A. (Honors) in Economics and received an M.A. in Economics from the Punjab University.

He received the Fulbright scholarship and went to the United States to attend the Indiana University Bloomington in Indiana, where he earned a PhD in Economics in 1955.

== Career ==
=== Public service, IMF, and World Bank ===
In 1955, he returned to Pakistan and joined the country's civil service and was initially posted at the Planning Commission. In 1956, he resigned from the Planning Commission and went to the United States to join the International Monetary Fund (IMF). He enjoyed a distinguished career at the IMF, eventually serving as economic adviser to Ghana in 1960. Thereafter, he moved on to join the International Finance Corporation and eventually become its Executive Vice President from 1974 until 1977. Qureshi oversaw the global operations which involved the financing of private enterprises and investments, including joint ventures and capital market operations in developing countries.

In 1981, he was invited by the then President of the World Bank, Robert McNamara, to join the World Bank and become the senior vice president of finance, which he remained until 1987. Eventually, he was appointed the Senior Vice President of the World Bank and oversaw its financial operations all over the world. In 1991–92, he left the World Bank and settled in the United States and formed a private Hedge fund, the Emerging Market Associates.

=== Caretaker Prime Minister of Pakistan ===
In 1993, Pakistan averted a major constitutional crisis when both Prime Minister Nawaz Sharif and President Ghulam Ishaq Khan resigned from their respective offices after an agreement brokered by the Pakistani military. The resolution was unique because an elected government had voluntarily stepped down in order to avoid possible military intervention and the resignations came through a constitutional process.

The Chief of Army Staff, General Abdul Waheed Kakar, and the Chairman of the Joint Chiefs of Staff Committee, General Shamim Alam, witnessed the implementation of the agreement as President Ghulam Ishaq was to be replaced by the Chairman of the Senate, Wasim Sajjad, who took over as the Acting President.

Meanwhile, Qureshi, who was visiting Singapore in 1993, received a telephone call from President Ghulam Ishaq asking him to form a caretaker, but technocratic, government. He reluctantly accepted the offer and returned to Islamabad soon after. At the time of his appointment, Qureshi was largely unknown to the public and political circles. It was, however, felt that, being a political outsider, he would remain neutral.

His tenure lasted for a three-month period but saw extensive reforms made by him that were supported by an IMF standby arrangement and significant World Bank lending. He initiated a process of "payment culture" that targeted the tax evaders and loan defaulters. He also ordered the publication of the list of taxpayers that showed that the country had a small tax base and only a few paid taxes. He devaluated the national currency and increased the prices on food and common items. He also inaugurated the National Library and highlighted its importance in the political culture of the country. Qureshi passed the decree that made the State bank of Pakistan an autonomous body with a view to keep the bank's business operations free from political interference. He downsized the administrative machinery, and abolished the discretionary powers of the Prime Minister and the Chief Ministers which allowed them to a lot residential flats and plots to their "favorites".

The state television, PTV, and Radio Pakistan were made independent and were given the opportunity to air elections freely and impartially. It goes to his credit that he undertook various endeavors in such a short period of time and made a serious effort to recover Government dues.

Despite his attempts to harmonize the economy, Qureshi's main task was to hold nationwide general elections in 1993 to make way for an elected government to form the government. In 1993, he oversaw the general elections held that year that witnessed the return of the Pakistan Peoples Party led by Benazir Bhutto.

== Personal life ==
Qureshi was married to Lilo Elizabeth Richter.

In 2014, Qureshi was diagnosed with the Parkinson's disease and reportedly underwent treatment for the chronic obstructive pulmonary disease (COPD) in a local hospital.

On November 23, 2016, his family announced that Qureshi had died in Washington, D.C., following a long illness that he was undergoing treatment for in a local hospital. He had had a lung infection and buried in Washington D.C.

== Legacy ==
=== EMP Global and private sector ===
After congratulating and witnessing Benazir Bhutto's oath administered by the Acting President Wasim Sajjad alongside the Chief Justice of Pakistan, Qureshi returned to New York, United States, in 1993 to establish the private hedge fund equity, the EMP Global. Qureshi was involved in forging an affiliation with the international insurance company, American International Group (AIG), for a number of years. AIG held a minority stake in EMP and served as a sponsor of, as well as a major investor in, a number of funds bearing its name for which EMP served as Principal Adviser. EMP bought out AIG's stake and became an independent company in 2005.

After his departure from Pakistan, Qureshi received criticism that, in his last days at the office, he made a large number of promotions and other administrative decisions in favor of his relatives. In 2014, his name was reportedly mentioned by Imran Khan when he led the Azadi March against Prime Minister Nawaz Sharif.

== Personal life ==
Qureshi was married to an American citizen, Lilo Elizabeth Richter, and has four children: two sons and two daughters. He enjoyed playing tennis and was reportedly a collector of classic cars and antiques. His mansion went on the market for $8 million in May 2016. It was purchased by President Donald Trump's counselor Kellyanne Conway for $7.785 million.

Political offices
Preceded by Nawaz Sharif	Prime Minister of Pakistan; Caretaker; 1993	Succeeded by Benazir Bhutto
