= Pakistan Muslim League – Junejo =

Pakistan Muslim League – Junejo پاکستان مسلم لیگ – جونیجو
- Abbreviation: PML-J
- President: Muhammad Iqbal Dar
- Founder: Muhammad Khan Junejo
- Founded: 1988; 38 years ago
- Succeeded by: Pakistan Muslim League – Jinnah (PML–J)
- Ideology: Pakistani nationalism Conservatism (Pakistan)

Election symbol
- Bus

The Pakistan Muslim League – Junejo (Note: Urdu: پاکستان مسلم لیگ – جونیجو) (PML–J) is a political party in Pakistan established in 1988. It is one of the factions of the original Pakistan Muslim League, named "J" after Muhammad Khan Junejo. It was created in 1986 as the sole Pakistan Muslim League when Muhammad Khan Junejo was the Prime Minister of Pakistan under President Muhammad Zia-ul-Haq.

== History ==
In September 1988, the party formed an alliance called Islami Jamhoori Ittehad with Ghulam Mustafa Jatoi's National Peoples Party, and Qazi Hussain Ahmed's Jamaat-e-Islami against Benazir Bhutto's Pakistan Peoples Party for the 1988 general elections. During that time Nawaz Sharif became the most prominent politician outside PPP, and eventually became the Prime Minister of Pakistan in 1990.

After Junejo was dismissed by Gen Zia ul Haq, Nawaz Sharif parted with the PML, and created his own faction called the PML (N), which became a major political party far more influential than the original PML. Junejo's death also marked the formation of PML (Junejo) in 1993 led by his supporters including Hamid Nasir Chattha, Iqbal Ahmed Khan, Manzoor Wattoo, Akhtar Ali Vario and Sardar Arif Nakai.

There was a party split within PML –Junejo when Manzoor Wattoo in 1995 parted ways with his cousin Hamid Nasir Chattha and created his own PML–Jinnah. The party broke because Chattha wanted to be the president of PML (Junejo), much to the annoyance of Wattoo. The differences cropped up in the same year when Wattoo was removed as the Punjab Chief Minister in the power struggle between the province (headed by PML (Junejo) and the center (headed by rival PPP), leading Arif Nakai another PML (Junejo) candidate to be the new Chief Minister.

At the 2002 general elections held on 20 October, the party won 0.7% of the popular vote and 2 out of 272 elected members. Hamid Nasir Chattha was the head of the party.

In May 2004, PML–J merged with PML–Q along with other parties to form united PML.

In the 2008 general elections, Hamid Nasir Chattha, being part of ruling PML–Q, lost his National Assembly seat.

However, in 2013, Hamid Nasir Chatta announced to revive the PML–Junejo again and contested the general elections on the platform of PML-J but the party didn't get any seat in 2013 general elections.

As of 2013, the party's current leader is Muhammad Iqbal Dar.

== Electoral history ==
=== National Assembly elections ===
National Assembly
Election	Votes	%	Seats	+/–
1993	781,652	3.9%	6 / 207	▲6
1997	624,286	3.3%	0 / 207	▼6
2002	283,755	0.7%	3 / 342	▲3
2013	71,773	0.16%	0 / 342	▼3
