= 1993 Pakistani general election =

- 6 October 1993

All 217 seats in the National Assembly 109 seats needed for a majority
- Registered: 51,867,876
- Turnout: 40.02% (▼5.15pp)
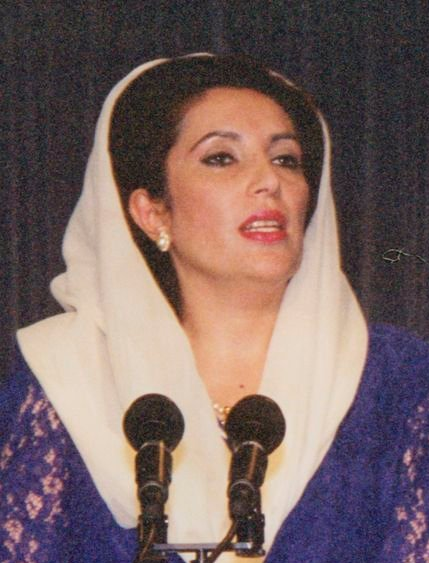

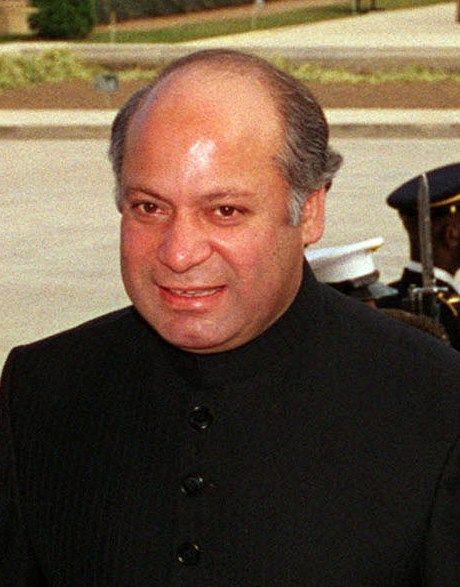
	First party	Second party
Leader	Benazir Bhutto	Nawaz Sharif
Party	PPP	PML(N)
Last election	44	106
Seats won	89	73
Seat change	▲45	▼33
Popular vote	7,578,635	7,980,229
Percentage	37.00%	38.96%
Swing	▲0.99pp	▲2.42pp
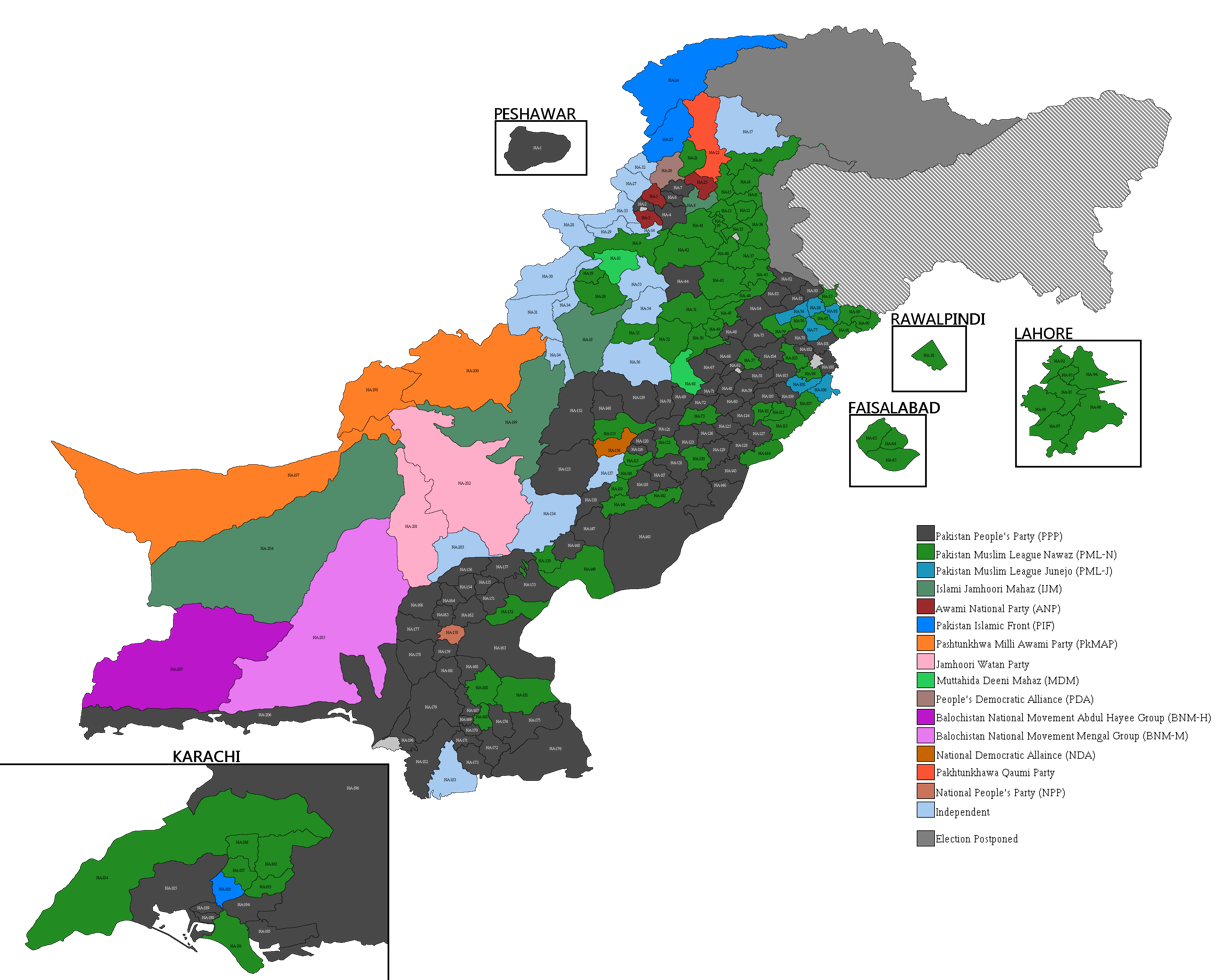
- Results by constituency
Prime Minister before election
Nawaz Sharif
IJI
Elected Prime Minister
Benazir Bhutto
PPP

General elections were held in Pakistan on 6 October 1993 to elect the members of National Assembly. The elections took place after both the Prime Minister Nawaz Sharif and President Ghulam Ishaq Khan resigned to resolve a power struggle.

Prior to the elections, the ruling Islami Jamhoori Ittehad alliance was dissolved due to clashes between its member parties. The alliance's place in the two-party system (alongside the Pakistan Peoples Party) was taken up by Sharif's Pakistan Muslim League (N).

The elections were held under the caretaker government of Moeenuddin Ahmad Qureshi. Although the PML (N) received the most votes, the PPP won the most seats. After winning the support of minor parties and independents, Benazir Bhutto became Prime Minister for a second non-consecutive term. Voter turnout was 40%.

== Background ==
The Pakistan Muslim League (N) (PML-N) won the 1990 election and the party's leader, Nawaz Sharif, became Prime Minister. In early 1993 he attempted to strip the President of the power to dismiss the Prime Minister, National Assembly and regional assemblies. However, in April 1993 President Khan dismissed Sharif for corruption and called elections for 14 July after dissolving the National Assembly. Sharif immediately appealed to the Supreme Court, which in May ruled by 10 to 1 that Khan had exceeded his powers and therefore restored Sharif as Prime Minister.

Khan and Sharif then began to battle for control of Pakistan for the next two months. They both attempted to secure control over the regional assemblies and in particular, Punjab. In Punjab this saw a staged kidnapping and the moving of 130 members of the Punjab Assembly to the capital to ensure they stayed loyal to Sharif. Meanwhile, the leader of the main opposition party Benazir Bhutto threatened to lead a march on Islamabad unless new elections were called.

Finally on 18 July, under pressure from the army to resolve the power struggle, Sharif and Khan resigned as Prime Minister and President respectively. Elections for the National Assembly were called for 6 October with elections for the regional assemblies set to follow shortly afterwards.

== Campaign ==
Until the election, the chairman of the Senate, Wasim Sajjad became interim president and former World Bank executive Moeen Qureshi became caretaker prime minister. The interim government cut spending, introduced a tax on rich landowners and cracked down on corruption and drug traffickers. They were praised for stabilising the country while the campaign took place but their policies were criticised by the two main political leaders, Sharif and Bhutto.

In total 1,485 candidates stood in the election but the main fight was between the PML-N of Nawaz Sharif and the PPP of Benazir Bhutto. Their policies were very similar but saw a clash of personalities, with both parties making many promises but not explaining how they were going to pay for them. Sharif stood on his record of privatisation and development projects and pledged to restore his subsidized taxi loan program. Bhutto promised price supports for agriculture, pledged a partnership between government and business and campaigned strongly for the female vote. Over 50 people (including former chief minister of Punjab Ghulam Haider Wyne) were killed in violence in the run up to the elections.

Opinion polls showed a very close election between the two main parties but there was a lot of cynicism among voters. The army was credited with making sure that the election was fair and deployed 150,000 troops in polling stations to ensure this.

== Results ==
The PPP won the most seats in the election at 86 but failed to gain a majority with the PML-N second with 73 seats. This was also the first election in Pakistan in which the party that won the popular vote, the PML-N, failed to win the most seats. The PPP performed strongly in Bhutto's native Sindh and rural Punjab, while the PML-N was strongest in industrial Punjab and the largest cities such as Karachi, Lahore and Rawalpindi. Islamic fundamentalist candidates did poorly in an election that was marked by a low turnout. Turnout in Pakistan's largest city, Karachi, was particularly low at 20% after one party MQM (A) boycotted the election. International observers from 40 countries reported no serious irregularities in an election which was seen as the most free and fair since 1970. One seat was not contested on election day due to the death of a candidate; it was subsequently won in a by-election by the People's Democratic Alliance.

Party	Votes	%	Seats	+/–
Pakistan Muslim League (N)	7,980,229	38.96	73	New
Pakistan Peoples Party	7,578,635	37.00	89	New
Pakistan Muslim League (J)	781,652	3.82	6	New
Pakistan Islamic Front	645,278	3.15	3	New
Islamic Jamhoori Mahaz	480,099	2.34	4	New
Awami National Party	335,094	1.64	3	–3
Mutahida Deeni Mahaz	216,937	1.06	2	New
Pashtunkhwa Milli Awami Party	97,541	0.48	3	+2
National Democratic Alliance	64,713	0.32	1	New
Jamhoori Wattan Party	54,607	0.27	2	0
Pakhtun-khwa Qaumi Party	54,144	0.26	1	New
National Peoples Party (Khar)	48,721	0.24	1	New
Balochistan National Movement (Hayee)	47,648	0.23	1	New
Balochistan National Movement (Mengal)	45,228	0.22	1	New
Other parties	107,979	0.53	0	–
Independents (Muslims)	1,482,033	7.24	16	–6
Non-Muslim seats	460,454	2.25	10	0
Vacant			1	–
Total	20,480,992	100.00	217	0
Valid votes	20,480,992	98.66		
Invalid/blank votes	277,187	1.34		
Total votes	20,758,179	100.00		
Registered voters/turnout	51,867,876	40.02		
Source: Nohlen et al.

== Aftermath ==
=== Election for Prime Minister ===
The election for Prime Minister took place on 19 October 1993. Both main parties lobbied the smaller parties and independents for their support in the National Assembly; the PPP was successful and Benazir Bhutto was elected Prime Minister receiving 121 votes to 72 for Nawaz Sharif. Her position was strengthened by a strong performance by the PPP in the regional elections on 9 October, in which the PPP, with the help of its Alliance partners, managed to retake Punjab for the first time since 1971.

119 votes required
Candidate	Party	Votes	%
Benazir Bhutto	Pakistan Peoples Party	121	62.69
Nawaz Sharif	Pakistan Muslim League (N)	72	37.31
Total		193	100.00
