= Buzdar provincial government =

PTI-led Provincial cabinet of Punjab, Pakistan, from 2018 to 2022

- Cabinet of Punjab, Pakistan
- 2018 - 2022
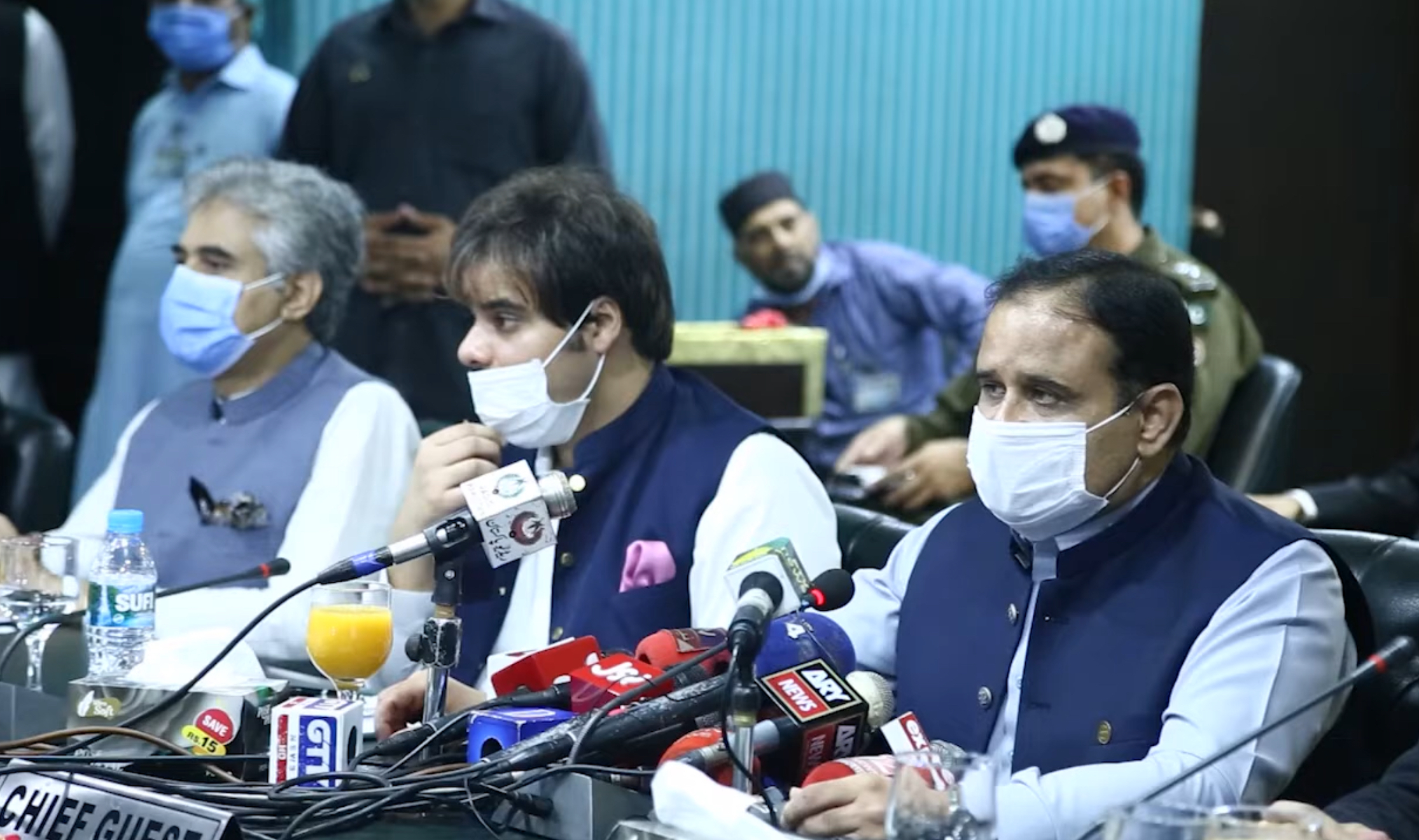
- Date formed: 27 August 2018
- Date dissolved: 1 April 2022

People and organisations
- Governor: Chaudhry Muhammad Sarwar
- Chief Minister: Sardar Usman Buzdar
- Senior Minister: Aleem Khan (Note: Only from 2020 to 2021)
- Total no. of members: 35
- Member parties: Pakistan Tehreek-e-Insaf; Pakistan Muslim League (Q)
- Status in legislature: Punjab Assembly 192 / 371 (52%)
- Opposition party: Pakistan Muslim League (N)
- Opposition leader: Hamza Shahbaz

History
- Election: 2018 Punjab provincial election
- Legislature term: 5 years
- Predecessor: Third Shehbaz
- Successor: Hamza Shahbaz

The Buzdar provincial government was the Government of Punjab, Pakistan led by Chief Minister of Punjab, Sardar Usman Buzdar and the Pakistan Tehreek-e-Insaf (PTI) from 27 August 2018 to 1 April 2022. His cabinet saw many ministers from the First Parvez Elahi provincial government such as Mian Aslam Iqbal, Aleem Khan and Sibtain Khan. Yasmin Rashid, a politician and gynecologist was granted all health portfolios, and Hashim Jawan Bakht became provincial Minister of Finance. The cabinet also saw reshuffles and de-seatment.

== History ==
=== Inauguration ===
Provincial elections were held in Punjab on 25 July 2018 to elect 17th Provincial Assembly of the Punjab. The Pakistan Tehreek-e-Insaf (PTI) won 184 out of total 297 direct seats in the Punjab Assembly. The chief minister candidate was announced as Shah Mehmood Qureshi prior to the elections, though party leader of PTI and prime minister, Imran Khan announced it to be changed to Sardar Usman Buzdar. His nomination surprised many in the PTI and received widespread criticism as he was a lesser known figure.

On 19 August 2018, he was elected as the chief minister of Punjab. He received 186 votes against his opponent Hamza Shahbaz Sharif who secured 159 votes. He was sworn in on 20 August 2018.

After assuming the office as the chief minister of Punjab, Buzdar held consultations with Imran Khan and formed a 23-member cabinet. The 23-member cabinet was sworn in on 27 August 2018. The second part of his cabinet, consisting of 12 provincial ministers was sworn in on 13 September 2018 increasing the size of the cabinet to 35. Meanwhile Chaudhry Muhammad Sarwar was made Governor of Punjab in Buzdar's government on 5 September 2018.

=== Tenure ===
The Buzdar government introduced education measures and announced it would construct universities, continued implementation of the Sehat Sahulat Program, began the Insaaf Medicine Card, and launched a health card for Lahore Division, introduced a relief package and provincial ordinance in response to the COVID-19 pandemic, announced a Rs 25bn development program for South Punjab and initiatives for DG Khan District.

== Cabinet ==
| Pakistan Tehreek-e-Insaf | Pakistan Muslim League (Q) |
Other Ministers in the cabinet are not covered. Senior Minister and Chief Minister are written in **bold**

Punjab Cabinet under Chief Minister Usman Buzdar (2018–2022)
| Post | Portrait | Minister | Term start | Term end |
|---|---|---|---|---|
| **Chief Minister of Punjab** | | **Usman Buzdar, MPA** | **20 August 2018** | **30 April 2022** |
| **Senior Minister of Punjab, Minister for Food** | | **Abdul Aleem Khan, MPA** | **13 April 2020** | **26 November 2021** |
| Minister for Local Government & Community Development | | Mehmood-ur-Rasheed, MPA | 27 August 2018 | 28 March 2022 |
| Minister for Law & Parliamentary Affairs, Minister for Cooperatives | | Muhammad Basharat Raja, MPA | 27 August 2018 21 November 2020 | 1 April 2022 1 April 2022 |
| Minister for Industries, Commerce & Investment, Minister for Information & Culture | | Mian Aslam Iqbal, MPA | 27 August 2018 19 July 2019 | 1 April 2022 2 December 2019 |
| Minister for Finance | | Makhdoom Hashim Jawan Bakht, MPA | 27 August 2018 | April 2022 |
| Minister for Primary & Secondary Health, Minister for Specialized Healthcare & Medical Education | | Yasmin Rashid, MPA | 28 August 2018 28 August 2018 | April 2022 April 2022 |
| Minister for Prisons, Minister for Colonies, Minister for Information & Culture | | Fayaz-ul-Hasan Chohan, MPA | 3 November 2020 6 July 2019 2 December 2019 | April 2022 21 December 2020 2 November 2020 |
| Minister for Literacy & Non-formal Basic Education | | Raja Rashid Hafeez, MPA | 27 August 2018 | April 2022 |
| Minister for Mines & Minerals | | Hafiz Ammar Yasir, MPA | 6 September 2018 | 18 January 2019 |
| Minister for Revenue | | Malik Muhammad Anwar, MPA | 29 August 2018 | April 2022 |
| Minister for Special Education | | Muhammad Akhlaq, MPA | 13 September 2018 | 10 April 2022 |
| Minister for Higher Education, Minister for Punjab Information Technology Board | | Yasir Humayun, MPA | 27 August 2018 22 July 2019 | April 2022 27 March 2022 |
| Minister for Youth Affairs, Sports, Minister for Tourism | | Muhammad Rai Taimoor Khan, MPA | 27 August 2018 19 July 2019 | 10 April 2022 10 April 2022 |
| Minister for Forestry, Minister for Forestry, Wildlife & Fisheries | | Sibtain Khan, MPA | 7 January 2020 29 August 2018 | 1 April 2022 January 2019 |

The Punjab Assembly in 2018 following elections: PTI: 179 seats PMLN: 164 seats PMLQ: 10 seats PPP: 7 seats PRHP: 1 seat IND: 4 seats WITHHELD: 6 seats

=== De-seated Ministers ===
In February 2019, Minister Aleem Khan was arrested by the National Accountability Bureau (NAB) under the Imran Khan government for multiple inquiries, including one involving offshore company Hexam Investment Overseas Ltd, one for owning assets beyond his known sources of income, and inquiries into his questionable business practices related to his housing societies. The same day, he announced his resignation as Provincial Minister of Punjab for Local Government and Community Development. The probe was on his housing societies was later closed. In the case of assets beyond means he was given a bail as no evidence proving his guilt was provided. The Lahore High Court granted bail to Aleem Khan on 13 April 2020. After proving his innocence, he was again appointed to the Provincial Cabinet as the Senior Minister of Punjab and Provincial Minister of Punjab for Food but resigned in November 2021.

In January 2019, Minister Sibtain Khan was arrested by the National Accountability Bureau Lahore due to corruption charges during the tenure of his own PTI government and due to this, he was removed from his post of Provincial Minister of Punjab for Forestry, Wildlife and Fisheries. He remained in prison for one year and released on bail in December 2019.

== See also ==
- Usman Buzdar
