= 2002 Pakistani provincial elections =

The 2002 Pakistani provincial elections may refer to:

- 2002 Balochistan provincial election
- 2002 North-West Frontier Province provincial election
- 2002 Punjab provincial election
- 2002 Sindh provincial election
