= Syed Samsam Bukhari =

Pakistani politician

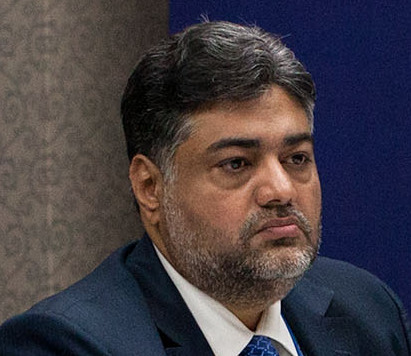

Provincial Minister of Punjab for Forest, Wildlife and Fisheries
- In office 20 July 2020 – April 2022
- Governor: Chaudhry Mohammad Sarwar
- Chief Minister: Usman Buzdar

Provincial Minister of Punjab for Consolidation of Holdings
- In office 19 July 2019 – April 2022
- Governor: Chaudhry Mohammad Sarwar
- Chief Minister: Usman Buzdar

Provincial Minister of Punjab for Information and Culture
- In office 6 March 2019 – 19 July 2019
- Governor: Chaudhry Sarwar
- Chief Minister: Usman Buzdar
- Preceded by: Fayyaz ul Hassan Chohan
- Succeeded by: Mian Muhammad Aslam Iqbal

Member of the Provincial Assembly of Punjab
- In office 19 October 2018 – 14 January 2023
- Speaker Assembly: Parvez Elahi
- Constituency: PP-201 Sahiwal-VI

Ministry of Information & Broadcasting (Pakistan)
- In office 22 June 2012 – 16 March 2013
- President: Asif Ali Zardari
- Prime Minister: Yusuf Raza Gillani
- In office 3 November 2008 – 11 February 2011
- President: Asif Ali Zardari
- Prime Minister: Raja Pervaiz Ashraf

Member of the National Assembly of Pakistan
- In office 2008–2013
- Preceded by: Syed Gulzair Sabtain Shah
- Succeeded by: Syed Muhammad Ashiq Hussain Shah
- Constituency: NA-145 (Okara-III)

Personal details
- Born: 20 April 1965 (age 61) Lahore, Punjab, Pakistan
- Children: 1 son and 2 daughters
- Education: Government College University
- Profession: Agriculturist, Sajada Nasheen Karmanwala, politician

Syed Samsam Ali Shah Bukhari (Urdu: سید صمصام علی شاہ بخاری) (born 20 April 1967) is a Pakistani politician and a former Member of the National Assembly of Pakistan from NA-145 (Okara-III) for the Pakistan Peoples Party Parliamentarians. He is from the village of Karmanwala, Okara District and resides in Lahore, Punjab. He was a member of the Provincial Assembly of the Punjab from October 2018 till January 2023. He had been Provincial Minister of Punjab for Information and Culture from 6 March 2019 to 19 July 2019 after resignation of Fayyaz ul Hassan Chohan. On 20 July 2020, he was appointed provincial minister of Punjab for Fisheries and Wildlife and stayed in that role until April 2022.

== Education ==
Masters in English Literature, Government College University Lahore.

== Career ==
Sumsam Ali Shah Bukhari was introduced into politics in 2002 by Late Syed Sajjad Haider Kirmani, 5 times MNA and District Nazim at the time. Syed Sajjad Haider Kirmani held Syed Sumsam Ali Shah's family in high regard and was very fond of Syed Sumsam Ali Shah Bukhari. He treated him like a son. He graciously had him fight the election in his own constituency. Syed Sajjad Haider Kirmani had served as minister several times, he was uncle of Syeda Jugnu Mohsin MPA. Under the guidance of Syed Sajjad Haider Sumsam Ali participated in his first election as an independent candidate. In 2002 he lost to Syed Gulzar Sabtain (PML-Q). The nature of this win was very questionable and there was no doubt that Sumsam's inexperience was used against him and the ballot was tampered with. Despite the loss he continued to work hard for the people of his district and was always popular due to his hard work and honest nature.

Samsam Ali participated in the 2008 general elections as a candidate for the PPPP and was elected over Syed Gulzar Sabtain. He was appointed Minister of State for Information, citing his public relations. Ali maintains relations with the Alnoor family from Rajowal, which contributed to his electoral outcomes in 2008 and 2018. He established a national political position and has not been named in corruption cases.

In 2013 he lost the general to Syed Aashiq Hussain Kirmani (PML N). PML-N won in Punjab heavily this year and PPPP suffered many heavy blows.

He joined Imran Khan's Tehreek e Insaaf in July 2015 with Ashraf Sohna. The Okara district is a PML-N stronghold. Sumsam Ali's former rival Gulzar Sabtain also joined hands with him in the early months of 2018 and continue to work together. Inter party politics led to Sumsam losing his closest ally, Ashraf Sohna just before the election, it was a huge personal and political blow. The independents spent a lot of money to buy the public which led to the vote in the constituency getting divided in the favour of the PML-N. Neither PTI nor strong independent candidates were able to win due to lack of unity. Syed Sumsam Ali along with the whole of the Okara district and many seasoned politicians, lost the 2018 general elections to the PML-N.

The party had granted him the ticket for MPA from Sahiwal for the 2018 by-election. Sumsam Ali won in October 2018 and is currently serving as a MPA (PTI) from Punjab. He continues to work in close proximity to the party centre, primarily with the Chief Minister of Punjab, Usman Buzdar, and the Governor of Punjab, Chaudhry Sarwar. Both had played a very important role behind his success in general election 2018.

== Personal life ==
He has traveled to over 100 countries. His hobbies include reading, farming and hunting. He is married with a son and two daughters.
