= Buzdar =

Buzdar may refer to:

- Buzdar (tribe), a clan of the Baloch people of Pakistan
- Sardar Usman Buzdar, Pakistani politician, former Chief Minister of Punjab
- Sardar Fateh Buzdar, Pakistani politician, former member of the Punjab Assembly

== See also ==
- Basti Buzdar, a town in Punjab, Pakistan

- kohe suleman, a place bitween Balochistan, Pakistan
