= Barthi =

Barthi may refer to:

- Bartians, an Old Prussian tribe
- Barthi, Bangladesh
- Barthi, Punjab, town in Punjab Pakistan
