= First Parvez Elahi provincial government =

Provincial Government in Punjab, Pakistan (2003–2007)

- Cabinet of Punjab, Pakistan
- Date formed: 3 January 2003
- Date dissolved: 18 November 2007

People and organisations
- Governor: Khalid Maqbool
- Chief minister: Parvez Elahi
- Member party: Pakistan Muslim League (Q); Coalition partners: PPPP; National Alliance
- Status in legislature: Provincial Assembly of the Punjab 267 / 371 (Note: Held both by the PML(Q) and its coalition partners.)

History
- Election: 2002
- Predecessor: Governor's rule
- Successor: Second Shehbaz Sharif provincial government

The First Parvez Elahi provincial government was the cabinet of the Government of Punjab, Pakistan formed by Chaudhary Parvez Elahi following the 2002 Punjab provincial election, in which Elahi and his Pakistan Muslim League (Q) party secured a victory and formed a government which ruled until 2007. His cabinet included many new ministers who were members of his party.

His cabinet took several weeks in its formative period, as though the cabinet was elected on 10 October 2002, its ministers took their official oath of office on 3 January 2003. The reason for its late formation, was that the cabinet faced issues in its formation, and just like in the national general elections, the PML-Q was forced to form a coalition government with the Pakistan Peoples Party Parliamentarians (79 seats in Punjab) and the National Alliance (15 seats in Punjab).

His cabinet presided over many new projects and initiatives in many sectors which were part of Parvez Elahi's Chief ministership. The cabinet, which ruled from early 2003 until late 2007 was Elahi's first, as his second cabinet ruled from 2022 to 2023. The cabinet automatically dissolved as Parvez Elahi's chief ministership ended on 18 November 2007.

== Cabinet ==
=== Cabinet Head ===
- Leader of the Punjab Assembly, Chief Minister of Punjab: Chaudhary Parvez Elahi

=== Ministers ===
- Minister for Public Health Engineering, Management and Professional Development: Mushtaq Ahmed Kiani
- Minister for CMIT, Implementation and Coordination: Shuja Khanzada
- Minister for Local Government & Community Development, Minister for Law, Parliamentary Affairs & Public Prosecution: Muhammad Basharat Raja
- Minister for Revenue & Relief: Gul Hameed Khan Rokhri
- Minister for Prisons: Saeed Akbar Khan
- Minister for Communication & Works: Chaudhry Zaheer-ud-Din
- Minister for Health: Muhammad Iqbal Gujjar
- Minister for Excise & Taxation: Rana Shamshad Ahmed Khan
- Minister for Labour: Rana Muhammad Qasim Noon
- Minister for Food: Hussain Jahania Gardezi
- Minister for Transport: Ghulam Mohy-ud-Din Chishti
- Minister for Finance: Sardar Hasnain Bahadar Dreshak
- Minister for Culture & Youth Affairs: Chaudhry Shaukat Ali Bhatti
- Minister for Cooperatives: Malik Muhammad Anwar
- Minister for Education: Mian Imran Masood
- Minister for Industries: Muhammad Ajmal Cheema
- Minister for Mines & Minerals: Muhammad Sibtain Khan
- Minister for Agricultural Marketing: Syed Akhtar Hussain Rizvi
- Minister for Women Development: Ashifa Riaz Fatyana
- Minister for Commerce & Investment: Suhail Zafar Cheema
- Minister for Power: Armughan Subhani
- Minister for Population Welfare: Nasim Lodhi
- Minister for Agriculture: Arshad Khan Lodhi
- Minister for Environment Protection: Anjum Amjad
- Minister for Information Technology: Abdul Aleem Khan
- Minister for Tourism: Mian Muhammad Aslam Iqbal
- Minister for Housing & Urban Development: Syed Raza Ali Gillani

Source: Punjab Assembly, Cabinet and Functionaries, 2002-2007

=== Advisors ===
Major (retired) Asghar Hayat Kalyar
