= Mian Aslam Iqbal =

Pakistani politician

Mian Muhammad Aslam Iqbal
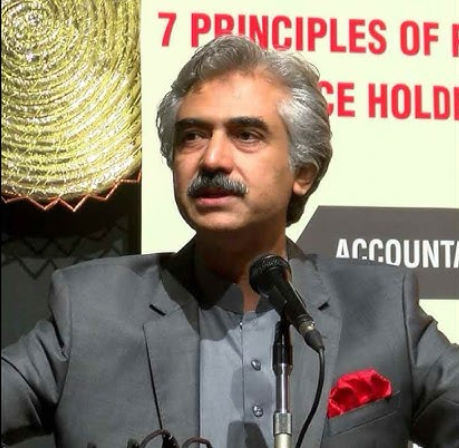

Provincial Minister of Punjab for Industries, Commerce and Investment
- In office 27 August 2018 – 1 April 2022
- Governor: Chaudhry Sarwar
- Chief Minister: Usman Buzdar

Provincial Minister of Punjab for Information and Culture
- In office 19 July 2019 – 2 December 2019
- Governor: Chaudhry Sarwar
- Chief Minister: Usman Buzdar
- Preceded by: Syed Samsam Bukhari
- Succeeded by: Fayyaz ul Hassan Chohan

Provincial Minister of Punjab for Tourism
- In office 2003–2007
- Governor: Khalid Maqbool
- Chief Minister: Parvez Elahi

Member of the Provincial Assembly of the Punjab
- In office 15 August 2018 – 14 January 2023
- Speaker: Parvez Elahi; Sibtain Khan
- Constituency: PP-151 Lahore-VIII
- In office 1 June 2013 – 31 May 2018
- Speaker: Rana Muhammad Iqbal Khan
- Constituency: PP-148 (Lahore-XII)
- In office 25 November 2002 – 17 November 2007
- Speaker: Chaudhry Muhammad Afzal Sahi
- Constituency: PP-148 (Lahore-XII)

Nazim UC-106 Lahore
- In office 2001–2002
- Mayor: Mian Amir Mehmood

Personal details
- Born: 20 April 1969 (age 57) Lahore, Punjab, Pakistan
- Party: PTI (2013-present)
- Other political affiliations: PML(Q) (2002-2013)

Mian Muhammad Aslam Iqbal is a Pakistani businessman and politician who had been the Provincial Minister of Punjab for Information and Culture from 19 July 2019 to 2 December 2019. He also had been the Provincial Minister of Punjab for Industries, Commerce and Investment, in office from 27 August 2018 till 1 April 2022. He was elected as a member of the Provincial Assembly of the Punjab in 2024 and had previously been a member of the assembly from November 2002 to November 2007, from June 2013 to May 2018 and from August 2018 to January 2023. He also served as Senior Minister of Punjab from September 2022 till January 2023. He was chosen by the Pakistan Tehreek-e-Insaf (PTI) to be candidate for Chief Minister of Punjab in the 2024 Punjab election.

== Early life and education ==
He was born on 20 April 1969 in a famous Arain family in Lahore. He holds a Bachelor of Arts degree from Government Islamia College Civil Lines, Lahore. He received the degree of Master of Business Administration (MBA) from Quaid-e-Azam University in 1996.

== Political career ==
=== Pakistan Muslim League (Q) ===
He was elected to the Provincial Assembly of the Punjab as an independent candidate from PP-148 (Lahore-XII) in the 2002 Punjab provincial election. He received 23,659 votes and defeated a candidate of Muttahida Majlis-e-Amal. He was made Provincial Minister of Punjab for Tourism in January 2003 where he served until 2007.

He ran for the seat of the Provincial Assembly of the Punjab as a candidate of Pakistan Muslim League (Q) (PML(Q)) from PP-148 (Lahore-XII) in the 2008 Punjab provincial election, but was unsuccessful. He received 16,734 votes and lost the seat to Hafiz Mian Muhammad Nauman, a candidate of Pakistan Muslim League (N) (PML(N)), who received 40,975 votes.

=== Pakistan Tehreek-e-Insaf ===
He was re-elected to the Provincial Assembly of the Punjab as a candidate of the Pakistan Tehreek-e-Insaf (PTI) from PP-148 (Lahore-XII) in the 2013 Punjab provincial election.

He was re-elected to the Provincial Assembly of the Punjab as a candidate of the PTI from PP-151 (Lahore-VIII) in 2018 Punjab provincial election. He received 65,830 votes and defeated Baqir Hussain, a candidate of PML(N).

=== Ministership (2018-2023) ===
On 27 August 2018, he was inducted into the provincial Punjab cabinet of Chief Minister Sardar Usman Buzdar and was appointed the Provincial Minister of Punjab for Industries, Commerce and Investment. During his tenure, he maintained a crackdown against hoarders under the Anti-Hoarding Ordinance. He further called upon departments for a crackdown on illegal profiteers calling them a ‘mafia’, whilst briefing meetings on price control.

On 19 July 2019, he was given additional portfolio of Provincial Minister of Punjab for Information and Culture.

In December 2019, he resigned from additional portfolio of Provincial Minister of Punjab for Information and Culture.

In September 2022, he was appointed senior minister of Punjab in Parvez Elahi’s provincial administration.

=== Candidate for Chief Minister of Punjab ===
He was selected by Imran Khan to be candidate for the position of Chief Minister of Punjab on behalf of PTI in early 2024 and ran from PP-170 Lahore-XXVII as a candidate of the PTI in the 2024 Punjab provincial election.

He was unable to take the oath as a member of the assembly, following 2024 election. He was chosen by PTI to be Leader of Opposition in the Punjab Provincial Assembly but has been unable to take the post due to police threats of an arrest and has been temporarily replaced due to this. He has been supporting Imran Khan and has been opposed to Maryam Nawaz’s Chief Ministership and has criticized several policies made by the PML-N Punjab provincial and national government stating that it has had poor governance, high electricity bills, and bad economic handling.
