= 2002 Balochistan provincial election =

Election in Balochistan Provincial 2002

- 10 October 2002

All 65 seats in the Provincial Assembly 38 seats needed for a majority

| | First party | Second party | Third party |
|---|---|---|---|
| Party | PML(Q) | MMA | National Alliance |
| Last election | Did not exist | 7 seats (Note: As Jamiat Ulema-e-Islam (F) (JUI-F)) | Did not exist |
| Seats won | 16 | 17 | 7 |
| Seat change | New | ▲10 | New |
Chief Minister before election
Jam Mohammad Yousaf
PML(Q)
Elected Chief Minister
Jam Mohammad Yousaf
PML(Q)

Provincial elections were held in the Pakistani province of Balochistan on 10 October 2002, alongside nationwide general elections and three other provincial elections in Sindh, North-West Frontier Province and Punjab.

The seats for the Provincial Assembly were increased from 43 to 65 seats in this election.

The Pakistan Muslim League (Q) (PML-Q) came first. Jam Mohammad Yousaf from the PML-Q continued as Chief Minister.

== Results ==
| Party | Votes | % | Seats | | | | |
| Party | Votes | % | General | Women | Non-Muslims | Total | +/– |
|---|---|---|---|---|---|---|---|
| Pakistan Muslim League (Q) | 219,026 | 19.30 | 11 | 4 | 1 | 16 | New |
| Muttahida Majlis-e-Amal | 188,878 | 16.64 | 13 | 3 | 1 | 17 | +10 |
| Jamhoori Wattan Party | 101,392 | 8.93 | 3 | 1 | 0 | 4 | −2 |
| National Alliance | 92,742 | 8.17 | 5 | 1 | 1 | 7 | New |
| Pashtunkhwa Milli Awami Party | 82,892 | 7.30 | 4 | 1 | 0 | 5 | +3 |
| Balochistan National Movement | 71,750 | 6.32 | 3 | 1 | 0 | 4 | +2 |
| Pakistan Peoples Party Parliamentarians | 69,957 | 6.16 | 2 | 0 | 0 | 2 | +1 |
| Balochistan National Party (Note: The Balochistan National Party (Mengal) (BNP-M) boycotted the election, but several members ran under the party name.) | 40,136 | 3.54 | 2 | 0 | 0 | 2 | −7 |
| Balochistan National Democratic Party | 32,360 | 2.85 | 1 | 0 | 0 | 1 | +1 |
| Other parties | 60,340 | 5.32 | 0 | 0 | 0 | 0 | – |
| Independents | 175,315 | 15.45 | 7 | 0 | 0 | 7 | −4 |
| Total | 1,134,788 | 100.00 | 51 | 11 | 3 | 65 | +22 |
Source: Election Commission of Pakistan (ECP), Free and Fair Election Network (FAFEN)

== Aftermath ==
After the election, the MMA and PML(Q) agreed to form a coalition government in the province. Jamal Shah Kakar of the MMA and Mohammad Aslam Bhutani of the PML(Q) were elected as Speaker and Deputy Speaker, respectively. Kakar and Bhutani received 37 and 46 votes, respectively, defeating Abdul Rahim Ziaratwal of the PMAP and Shama Ishaq Baloch of the BNM, who received 10 and 13 votes, respectively. Moreover, Jam Mohammad Yousaf of the PML(Q) was elected as the province's Chief Minister. He received 47 votes, defeating Mir Akbar Mengal of the BNP, who received 12 votes.
