= Marriyum Aurangzeb =

Pakistani politician (born 1980)

Senior Minister of Punjab
- Incumbent
- Assumed office 6 March 2024
- Governor: Baligh Ur Rehman; Sardar Saleem Haider Khan
- Chief Minister: Maryam Nawaz
- Preceded by: Mian Aslam Iqbal

Minister of Information, Broadcasting and National Heritage
- In office 18 April 2022 – 10 August 2023
- President: Arif Alvi
- Prime Minister: Shehbaz Sharif
- Preceded by: Fawad Chaudhry
- Succeeded by: Murtaza Solangi (as Minister of Information and Broadcasting); Jamal Shah (as Minister of National Heritage and Culture)

Member of the National Assembly of Pakistan
- In office 3 June 2013 – 10 August 2023
- Constituency: Reserved seat for women

Minister of Information and Broadcasting
- In office 27 April 2018 – 31 May 2018
- President: Mamnoon Hussain
- Prime Minister: Shahid Khaqan Abbasi
- Succeeded by: Syed Ali Zafar

Minister of State for Information and Broadcasting, National History and Literary Heritage
- In office 4 August 2017 – 27 April 2018
- President: Mamnoon Hussain
- Prime Minister: Shahid Khaqan Abbasi
- In office 31 October 2016 – 28 July 2017
- President: Mamnoon Hussain
- Prime Minister: Nawaz Sharif

Personal details
- Born: 16 July 1980 (age 46) Lahore, Punjab, Pakistan
- Party: PMLN (2013-present)
- Spouse: Aly Ud Din Ahmad Taseer
- Parent: Tahira Aurangzeb (mother)
- Relatives: Najma Hameed (aunt)
- Education: Quaid-i-Azam University; King's College London

Marriyum Aurangzeb (Punjabi: مریم اورنگزیب) is a Pakistani politician who currently serves as Senior Minister in the Government of Punjab, in office since March 2024.

Previously, she was a Member of the National Assembly of Pakistan twice and served as the Federal Minister of Information & Broadcasting twice first in the Abbasi ministry from April 2018 to May 2018 and then in the Shehbaz Sharif ministry from April 2022 to August 2023. She also served as Minister of State for Information and Broadcasting, twice, first from October 2016 to July 2017 in the third Sharif ministry and then from August 2017 to April 2018 in the Abbasi ministry.

She was elected as a Member of the Provincial Assembly of the Punjab on 23 February 2024 and was inducted into the provincial Punjab cabinet of Chief Minister Maryam Nawaz as Senior Minister with various portfolio.

== Early life and education ==
Marriyum was born to Tahira Aurangzeb and Raja Aurangzeb Abbasi in Lahore on 16 July 1980. She is the niece of Najma Hameed. She did her FSc. in Premedical in September 1996 and then Bachelor of Arts in September 1998, both from Federal Government College, Islamabad.

Aurangzeb did Master of Science in Economics from Quaid-i-Azam University in February 2002 and Master of Science in Environment and Development from King's College London in September 2003.

== Political career ==
Aurangzeb hails from a political family of Rawalpindi. Prior to entering politics, Aurangzeb worked in WWF-Pakistan from 2004 to 2013. She joined Pakistan Muslim League (N) (PML (N) in 2013 and was elected to the National Assembly as a candidate of PML-N on a reserved seat for women in the 2013 general election. Expanding upon the parliamentary tenure of her mother Tahira Aurangzeb, she swiftly advanced in her political career.

Aurangzeb had served as the Parliamentary Secretary for Interior and also as Chief Organiser of PML-N's Youth Women Wing, Islamabad, and Rawalpindi. Aurangzeb was considered a close associate of Maryam Nawaz, the daughter of then Prime Minister Nawaz Sharif, and was an active member of the PML-N's social media team. She was also a part of Maryam's team overseeing the education sector.

In October 2016, she was inducted into the federal cabinet of PM Nawaz Sharif and was appointed the Minister of State for Information & Broadcasting. She was made in charge of the Ministry of Information after Information Minister Pervaiz Rashid was sacked for failing to stop a media report on a rift between the Government of Pakistan and the Pakistan Army. She had ceased to hold ministerial office in July 2017 when the federal cabinet was disbanded following the disqualification of PM Nawaz Sharif after Panama Papers case.

Following the election of Shahid Khaqan Abbasi as Prime Minister of Pakistan in August 2017, she was inducted into the federal cabinet and was re-appointed the Minister of State for Information. In April 2018, she was elevated as a federal minister and was appointed Federal Minister for Information & Broadcasting. Upon the dissolution of the National Assembly on the expiration of its term on 31 May 2018, Aurangzeb ceased to hold the office as Federal Minister for Information and Broadcasting.

Aurangzeb was appointed official spokesperson of PML-N on 2 June 2018.

She was re-elected to the National Assembly as a candidate of PML-N on a reserved seat for women from Punjab in the 2018 general election. During her second tenure as MNA, she served as Federal Minister of Information & Broadcasting from April 2022 to August 2023 in the cabinet of Prime Minister Shehbaz Sharif. She was regarded as being close to Shehbaz Sharif, often accompanying him on numerous foreign trips.

In the 2024 Pakistani general election, she filed her nomination papers as a candidate of PML-N for reserved seats for women in both the National Assembly and the Provincial Assembly of the Punjab. On 23 February, she took oath as a member of Punjab Assembly. Due to Maryam Nawaz lack of parliamentary experience, Aurangzeb instead of being assigned to the federal government, was transferred to the Punjab government to assist Maryam in handling the provincial government’s affairs. This also caused a stir among the PML-N MPs in Punjab Assembly as some MPs believed that Aurangzeb's presence may hinder their direct access to Maryam Nawaz. Reportedly, Nawaz Sharif approved Aurangzeb as Maryam Personal Staff Officer (PSO) for assistance. On 6 March, Aurangzeb was inducted into the provincial Punjab cabinet of Chief Minister Maryam Nawaz and was given the status of a Senior Minister of Punjab. virtually making her the deputy chief minister of Punjab. She was allocated portfolio of Planning & Development, Environment Protection & Climate Change, Forestry, Fisheries & Wildlife, as well Chief Minister’s Special Initiatives.

== Terror case ==
In September 2022, Aurangzeb was accused of "using religion to instil and spread hatred" against PTI chief and former Prime Minister Imran Khan, resulting in a terrorism case being filed against her in an Anti-Terrorism Court (ATC) in Lahore. In November 2023, the ATC issued non-bailable arrest warrants for Aurangzeb after she repeatedly failed to appear in court regarding the case filed against her in September 2022. However, in December 2023, accompanied by her legal team, she finally appeared before the court, leading to the lifting of the non-bailable arrest warrants. In January 2024, she was cleared of charges related to "anti-state speeches" by the ATC.

== Controversies ==
She is married to Australian citizen Aly Taseer, who is employed at Pakistan Tobacco Company. In July 2022, former Minister for Information Fawad Chaudhry accused Aurangzeb of supporting the cigarette industry, citing her husband's role as a representative of the tobacco industry in Pakistan. He further claimed that billions of rupees in tax concessions were granted to the tobacco industry due to Marriyum's advocacy, alleging that her lobbying efforts led to concessions being granted to foreign tobacco companies. The Pakistan Tehreek-e-Insaf (PTI) also stated its intention to submit a reference aiming for the disqualification of Aurangzeb from her position as Federal Information Minister. The reference was based on allegations of providing tax relief to her husband's tobacco company.
