= Aleem Khan =

Pakistani politician (born 1970)

- علیم خان
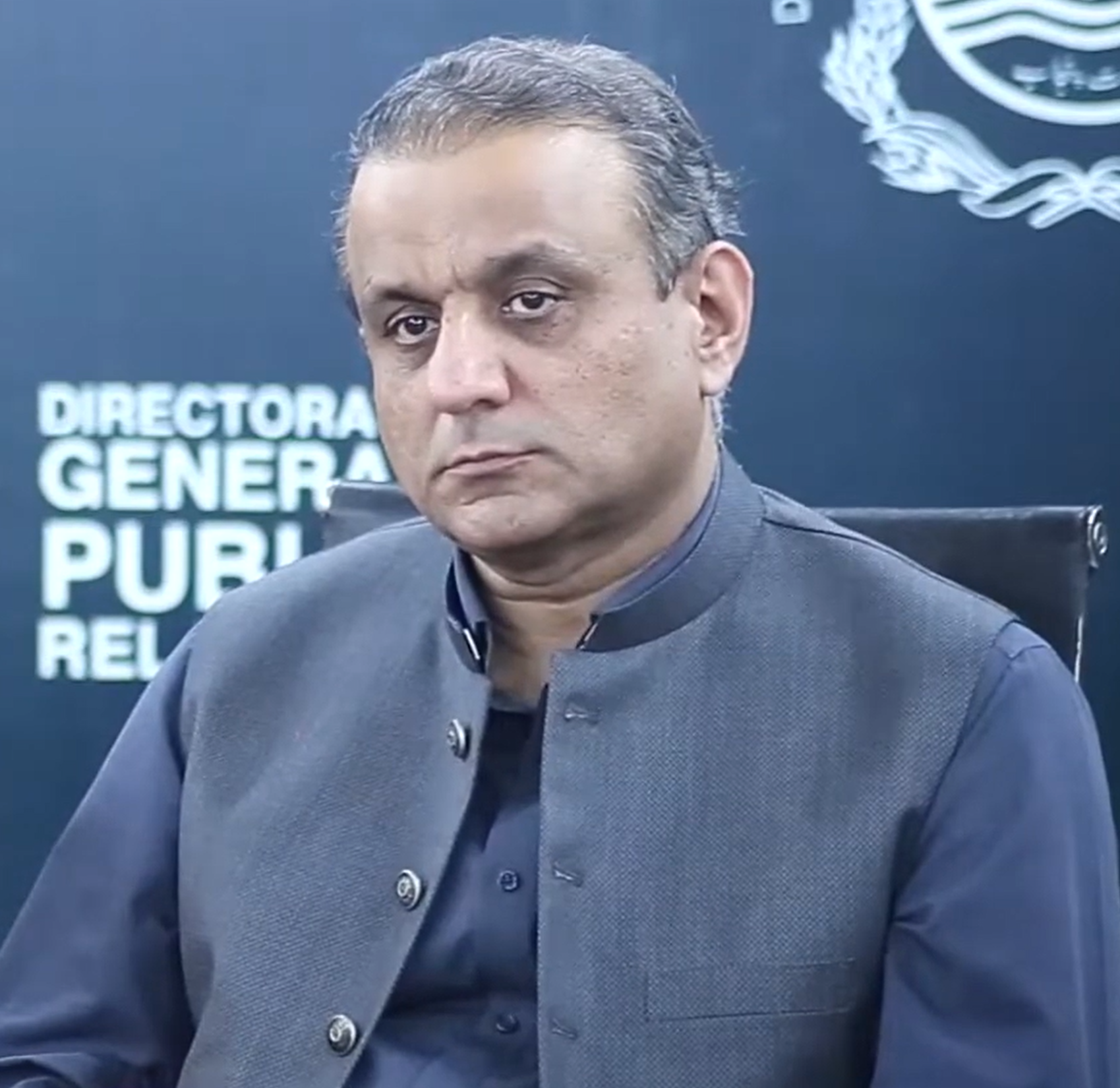
- Khan in 2021

Minister for Communications
- Incumbent
- Assumed office 3 April 2024
- Prime Minister: Shehbaz Sharif
- Preceded by: Shahid Ashraf Tarar (caretaker)

Minister for Privatisation
- In office 11 March 2024 – 27 February 2025
- Prime Minister: Shehbaz Sharif
- Preceded by: Fawad Hasan Fawad (caretaker)
- Succeeded by: Vacant

Chairman of the Board of Investment
- In office 11 March 2024 – 27 February 2025
- Prime Minister: Shehbaz Sharif
- Preceded by: Rahim Hayat Qureshi
- Succeeded by: Qaiser Ahmed Sheikh

President of Istehkam-e-Pakistan Party
- Incumbent
- Assumed office 12 June 2023

Member of National Assembly of Pakistan
- Incumbent
- Assumed office 29 February 2024
- Constituency: NA-117 Lahore-I

Provincial Minister of Punjab for Food
- In office 13 April 2020 – 26 November 2021
- Governor: Chaudhry Mohammad Sarwar
- Chief Minister: Usman Buzdar

Provincial Minister of Punjab for Local Governments and Community Development
- In office 27 August 2018 – 6 February 2019
- Governor: Chaudhry Sarwar
- Chief Minister: Usman Buzdar

Provincial Minister of Punjab for Planning and Development
- In office 27 August 2018 – 6 February 2019
- Governor: Chaudhry Sarwar
- Chief Minister: Usman Buzdar

Provincial Minister of Punjab for Information Technology
- In office 2003–2007
- Governor: Khalid Maqbool
- Chief Minister: Parvez Elahi

Member of the Provincial Assembly of the Punjab
- In office 15 August 2018 – 20 May 2022
- Speaker: Parvez Elahi
- Succeeded by: Mian Muhammad Akram Usman
- Constituency: PP-158 (Lahore-XV)
- In office 2002–2007
- Constituency: PP-147 (Lahore-XI)

Personal details
- Born: 5 March 1970 (age 56) Lahore, West Pakistan
- Party: IPP (2023–present)
- Other political affiliations: PTI (2012–2022); PML(Q) (2002–2012)

Abdul Aleem Khan Kakazai (Note: Urdu: عبدالعلیم خان کاکازئی) (born 5 March 1972) is a Pakistani politician and businessman who is serving as Minister of Communications since 2024. He is also the founding president of the Istehkam-e-Pakistan Party (IPP) since 2024.

Born in Lahore, West Pakistan, Khan joined the Pakistan Muslim League – Q (PML–Q) in 2002 and was elected to the Provincial Assembly of the Punjab in 2003. In 2012, he joined the Pakistan Tehreek-e-Insaf (PTI) and became a close aide to its leader Imran Khan. Aleem Khan served in the provincial Punjab cabinet under Usman Buzdar as Provincial Minister of Punjab for Local Government and Community Development. Following the 9 May riots in 2023, Khan left the PTI and, along with Jahangir Tareen, founded the IPP, of which he became the incumbent president. Khan won his seat in 2024 election, being one of the only three IPP candidates to win their seats, along with Gul Asghar Khan and Awn Chawdhary.

Khan is considered one of the wealthiest persons of Pakistan with his net worth to be over $400 million. He is the owner of Vision Group, which includes Park View City, and Samaa TV, which he acquired in 2020.

== Early life and education ==
Abdul Aleem Khan Kakazai was born on 5 March 1972 in Lahore, West Pakistan. He hails from a Punjabi Pathan family belonging to the Kakazai tribe. His wife, Kiran Aleem Khan, belongs to a Punjabi Jat family.

Khan received his early education from Crescent Model Higher Secondary School, Lahore. Later, he graduated with a degree in Bachelor of Arts from the Government College University (GCU) of Lahore in 1992.

== Business career ==
Aleem Khan is the founder and chairman of Vision Group, a real estate development company behind prominent projects such as Park View City in Lahore and Islamabad.

In 2021, he expanded into the media industry by acquiring the Samaa TV news channel through his company Park View Limited. Khan eventually had to resign as Punjab Minister for Food to avoid a conflict of interest.

Khan's diverse portfolio also includes entertainment ventures such as CineStar Cinemas in Lahore and Multan, where his group introduced IMAX screening facilities to Pakistan.

Aleem Khan's societies, Park View City Lahore and Park View City Islamabad were declared illegal in 2020 and 2022 respectively by the Ravi Urban Development Authority (RUDA) and the Islamabad High Court.However, the National Accountability Bureau (NAB) later stopped pursuing the case due to a lack of evidence. The Capital Development Authority (CDA) also restored a No Objection Certificate (NOC) with regard to the Parkview City.

Aleem Khan made two financial transactions of Rs 198 million and Rs 140 million during his tenure as Provincial Minister of Punjab for Information Technology between 2002 and 2007. His counsel provided a complete money trail for these transactions. The Lahore High Court in its detailed order in Writ Petition vide order dated 15/5/2019, stated that the allegations leveled by NAB had no basis and the honorable court had taken due notice of the fact that the provisions of S.9 of the NAO did not appear to have any nexus to the applicant. And that the allegations levelled against the applicant had no legal leg to stand on. Hence, he is granted bail and NAB was ordered to consign the file to the record room. According to documents submitted to the Election Commission of Pakistan in 2018, Aleem Khan declared his assets worth Rs. 918 million (US$3.3 million).

== Political career ==
Aleem Khan made his political debut in 2002 and contested the seat of the National Assembly of Pakistan as a candidate of Pakistan Muslim League (Q) (PML-Q) from Constituency NA-127 (Lahore-X) in the 2002 Pakistani general election but was unsuccessful. He received 20,545 votes and lost the seat to Muhammad Tahir-ul-Qadri.

He was elected to the Provincial Assembly of the Punjab as a candidate of PML-Q from Constituency PP-147 (Lahore-XI) in the by-elections held in January 2003. He received 18,059 votes and defeated Ameer ul Azim, a candidate of Muttahida Majlis-e-Amal (MMA). On 15 November 2003, he was inducted into the Punjab cabinet of Chief Minister Chaudhry Pervaiz Elahi and was appointed Provincial Minister of Punjab for Information Technology. He remained as the Provincial Minister for Information Technology of Punjab till 2007.

He contested the seat of the National Assembly as a candidate of PML-Q from Constituency NA-127 (Lahore-X) in the 2008 Pakistani general election but was unsuccessful. In the same election, he also contested the seat of the Provincial Assembly of the Punjab as a candidate of PML-Q from Constituency PP-147 (Lahore-XI) but was unsuccessful.

In January 2012, he quit PML-Q and joined Pakistan Tehreek-e-Insaf (PTI). In February 2013, he was elected as Deputy President of PTI Lahore but was not given ticket by PTI to contest 2013 Pakistani general election.

He contested the seat of the National Assembly as a candidate of PTI from Constituency NA-122 (Lahore-V) in by-election held in October 2015 but was unsuccessful. He received 72,043 votes and lost the seat to Sardar Ayaz Sadiq. Aleem Khan lost the 2015 by-election for the National Assembly due to alleged rigging. He submitted a petition with the Election Commission of Pakistan with evidence, but it was not accepted. In July 2016, PTI appointed him as the president of the party's Central Punjab Chapter.

He was elected to the Provincial Assembly of the Punjab as a candidate of PTI from Constituency PP-158 (Lahore-XV) in the 2018 Pakistani general election.

On 27 August 2018, he was inducted into the provincial Punjab cabinet of Chief Minister Sardar Usman Buzdar and was appointed Provincial Minister of Punjab for Local Government and Community Development. He was later given the status of a senior minister in the cabinet.

He was also the Senior Minister of Punjab and Minister of Food from 2020 to 2021. He also served as a member of the Provincial Assembly of the Punjab from August 2018 to 2021. He announced his separation from politics on Twitter in a tweet. Later in a statement to the media, he said that he had no intentions of joining politics again and that he would focus on the welfare through the Abdul Aleem Khan Foundation. In June 2023 he launched the IPP along with Jahangir Tareen. He is a founding member and the incumbent president of the party.

On 6 February 2019, the National Accountability Bureau arrested Aleem Khan for owning assets beyond known sources of income within Pakistan and abroad. Later on, he was proved innocent due to a lack of evidence. In February 2019, he was arrested by the National Accountability Bureau (NAB) for multiple inquiries, including one involving offshore company Hexam Investment Overseas Ltd, one for owning assets beyond his known sources of income, and inquiries into his questionable business practices related to his housing societies. The same day, he announced his resignation as Provincial Minister of Punjab for Local Government and Community Development. The probe on his housing societies was later closed. In the case of assets beyond means he was given a bail as no evidence proving his guilt was provided. The Lahore High Court granted bail to Aleem Khan on 13 April 2020. After proving his innocence, he was again appointed to the Provincial Cabinet as the Senior Minister of Punjab and Provincial Minister of Punjab for Food but resigned in November 2021.

In April 2022, Khan took a principled stand for accountability by voting in support of the opposition during a no-confidence motion, emphasizing his commitment to transparency over party politics. Although this courageous decision led to his de-seating in May 2022, he remained steadfast in his beliefs, choosing to resign from the ministry with integrity.

On 6 November 2022, the Anti-Corruption Establishment (ACE) filed an FIR against Aleem Khan, his wife, and his daughter for alleged document forgery in a land sale case. The National Accountability Bureau later dropped the charges due to the absence of evidences.

Aleem Khan announced his resignation from the ministry in a tweet and after a silence of few months he decided to launch his own party Istehkam-e-Pakistan Party in June 2023 amid the worsening economic conditions persisting in Pakistan. He is a founding member and was appointed president of the party.

Khan won his seat in the 2024 general election from Constituency NA 117, Shahdara Lahore and serves as Member of the National Assembly.
