= Buzdar (tribe) =

Languages
- Balochi

Religion
- Islam

Related ethnic groups
- Baloch people

Buzdar (Balochi: بزدار) is a clan of Baloch tribe of Rind, living in Balochistan, Sindh and Punjab provinces of Pakistan. They mostly live in the mountainous areas of Koh Suleiman.The estimated population of the tribe is 300,000 people. The word, literally meaning one who keeps or tends the goats, a shepherd, is a reference to the traditional occupation of Buzdars. Usman Buzdar is current Tumandar of the tribe.

== History ==
Buzdar, is a clan of Rind tribe, and usually associated with the mountainous districts of the frontier near Dera Ghazi Khan. They are also to be found in Musakhail District of Balochistan in Rara Sham, Andarpur, Behu, Jhandi, Karkana and as well as in Kingri, while the majority of the population live in the tribal area of Dera Ghazi khan mainly in Fazla Kach Barthi & Karrar Buzdar

The Buzdar community in Rahra Sham and Andarpur divide Bozdar into two main clans:

1. Ghulamani (mostly residing in Balochistan)
2. Bakhri (mostly residing in the Punjab province).

They are usually ranchers, and the name Buzdars probably derived from Buz, the Persian name for goat. Within the limits of their mountainous home, on the outer spurs of the Sulaiman Mountains, they have always been a martial tribe and they were formerly constantly feuding with the neighboring Ustarana and Sherani tribes.

In 1857, their raids into the Punjab drew upon them a punitive expedition under Brigadier-General Sir N. B. Chamberlain. The Sangarh pass was captured and the Buzdars/ Bozdar submitted.

== Notable people ==
- Sardar Fateh Buzdar, former member of Punjab Assembly
- Sardar Usman Buzdar, Former Chief Minister of Punjab
- Adv. Ghulam Mustafa Buzdar Former Attorney General Baluchistan

== See also ==
- Dhaghano Bozdar
