= Mehmood-ur-Rasheed =

Pakistani politician

Main Mehmood-ur-Rasheed
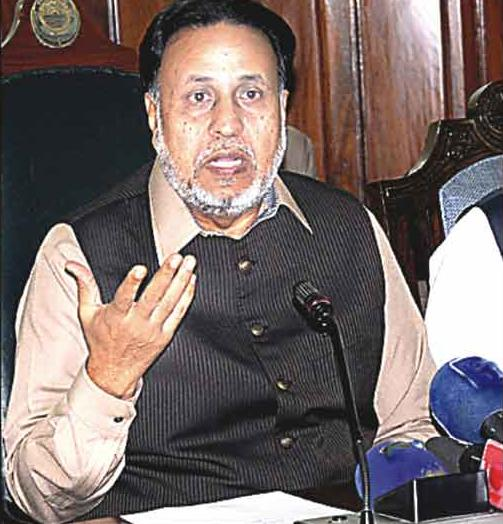

Provincial Minister of Punjab for Housing, Urban Development and Public Health Engineering
- In office 27 August 2018 – 28 March 2022

Leader of the Opposition Punjab
- In office 11 June 2013 – 31 May 2018

Member of the Provincial Assembly of the Punjab
- In office 15 August 2018 – 14 January 2023
- Constituency: PP-160 Lahore-XVII
- In office 29 May 2013 – 31 May 2018
- Constituency: PP-151 (Lahore-XV)
- In office 1988–1993
- Constituency: PP-127 (Lahore)

Personal details
- Born: 21 April 1954 (age 72) Lahore, Punjab, Pakistan
- Party: PTI (1997–present)
- Other political affiliations: JI (1993–1997); IJI (1988–1993)

Mian Mehmood ur Rashid is a Pakistani politician from Lahore who was the Provincial Minister of Punjab for Housing, Urban Development and Public Health Engineering, in office from 27 August 2018 till 28 March 2022. He had been a member of the Provincial Assembly of the Punjab from August 2018 to January 2023. Previously he was a Member of the Provincial Assembly of the Punjab from 1988 to 1993 and again from May 2013 to May 2018. He served as Leader of Opposition in the Provincial Assembly of the Punjab from June 2013 to May 2018. He is a senior member of the PTI, a party which he joined in 1997, one year after its founding.

== Early life and education ==
He was born on 21 April 1954 in Lahore to Arain Family. He received the degree of Bachelor of Arts (Hons.) in 1975 and a degree of Master of Arts in Economics in 1978 from University of the Punjab.

== Political career ==
He was elected to the Provincial Assembly of the Punjab as a candidate of Islami Jamhoori Ittehad (IJI) from PP-127 (Lahore) in the 1988 Pakistani general election. He received 26,729 votes and defeated a candidate of Pakistan Peoples Party (PPP). He was re-elected to the Provincial Assembly of the Punjab as a candidate of IJI from PP-127 (Lahore) in 1990 Pakistani general election. He received 38,022 votes and defeated a candidate of the Pakistan Democratic Alliance.

He ran for the seat of the Provincial Assembly of the Punjab as a candidate of the Pakistan Islamic Front from PP-127 (Lahore) in the 1993 I Pakistani general election, but was unsuccessful. He received 3,342 votes and lost the seat to a candidate of Pakistan Muslim League (N).

He joined the Pakistan Tehreek-e-Insaf (PTI) in 1997, one year after it was founded. He was re-elected to the Provincial Assembly of the Punjab as a candidate of the PTI from PP-151 (Lahore-XV) in the 2013 Punjab provincial election. In June 2013, he was elected as the Leader of the Opposition in the Provincial Assembly of the Punjab as the first PTI member to do so.

He was re-elected to the Provincial Assembly of the Punjab as a candidate of the PTI from PP-160 (Lahore-XVII) in the 2018 Punjab provincial election.

On 27 August 2018, he was inducted into the provincial Punjab cabinet of Chief Minister Usman Buzdar and was appointed Provincial Minister of Punjab for housing, urban development and public health engineering.

He ran for a seat in the Provincial Assembly from PP-169 Lahore-XXV as a candidate of the PTI in the 2024 Punjab provincial election. He won the seat, though he, and the PTI alleged it was rigged in favour of the Pakistan Tehreek-e-Insaf.

== Arrest and Current Status ==
Mehmood ur Rasheed along with many other PTI leaders were detained in May 2022 following the toppling of Imran Khan’s PTI government, ARY News reported that it was an attempt to crackdown on PTI leadership. He has been kept incarcerated in prison and has stated that it is an attempt to pressure him to leave PTI.

He was arrested on May 9, 2023 in an alleged relation to the May 9 events. He was arrested again in less than 10 days after police picked him up from Lahore. He has remained imprisoned over several court cases involving him since then, with PTI claiming it is an attempt to crackdown on him, other PTI seniors, and PTI. He has been sick and ill with appendix pain and required surgery in June 2024, but was sent back to jail immediately following this. He remains jailed and sick.
