= Third Shehbaz Sharif provincial government =

Third Sharif provincial government
- Cabinet of Punjab, Pakistan

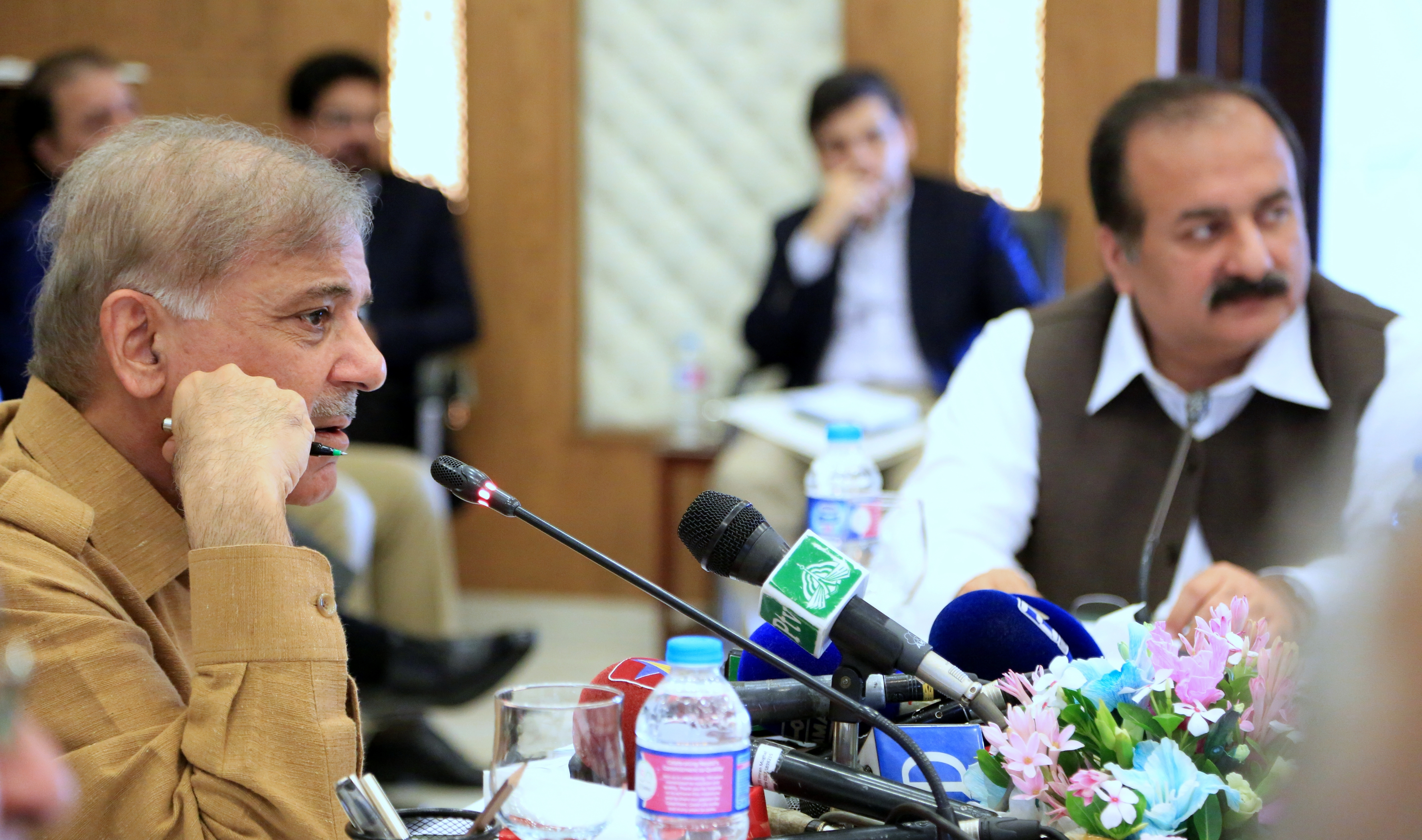
- Sharif (left) holding a cabinet meeting alongside then provincial minister Rana Mashhood (right) in 2017
- Date formed: 2013
- Date dissolved: 2018

People and organisations
- Head of state: Mamnoon Hussain
- Head of government: Shehbaz Sharif
- Member party: Pakistan Muslim League (N)
- Status in legislature: Majority

History
- Predecessor: Second Shehbaz Sharif provincial government
- Successor: Buzdar provincial government

The Third Sharif provincial government was formed by Shehbaz Sharif in 2013 to begin a new government following the 2013 Pakistani general election.

== Cabinet ==
=== Ministers ===
- Sher Ali Khan
- Tanveer Aslam Malik
- Malik Mukhtar Ahmad Bherath
- Muhammad Asif Malik
- Rana Sana Ullah Khan
- Sardar Muhammad Ayub Khan Ghadi
- Hameeda Waheeduddin
- Khawaja Imran Nazeer
- Bilal Yasin
- Mian Mujtaba Shuja ur Rehman
- Rana Mashood Ahmad Khan
- Zaeem Qadri
- Sheikh Allauddin
- Syed Raza Ali Gillani
- Mian Yawar Zaman
- Naghma Mushtaq
- Malik Nadeem Kamran
- Mian Atta Muhammad Manika
- Farrukh Javed
- Muhammad Naeem Akhtar Khan Bhabha
- Asif Saeed Manais
- Malik Ahmad Yar Hunjra
- Syed Haroon Ahmed Sultan Bokhari
- Mahar Ijaz Ahmad Achlana
- Malik Muhammad Iqbal Channar
- Chaudhry Muhammad Shafique
- Zakia Shahnawaz Khan
- Khalil Tahir Sandhu
- Amanat Ullah Khan Shadi Khel
- Aisha Ghaus Pasha
- Muhammad Mansha Ullah Butt
- Khawaja Salman Rafique
- Jahangir Khanzada
