= Second Shehbaz Sharif provincial government =

Second Sharif provincial government
- Cabinet of Punjab, Pakistan
- Date formed: 2008
- Date dissolved: 2013

People and organisations
- Head of state: Asif Ali Zardari
- Head of government: Shehbaz Sharif
- Member party: Pakistan Muslim League (N)
- Status in legislature: Majority

History
- Predecessor: First Parvez Elahi provincial government
- Successor: Third Shehbaz Sharif provincial government

The Second Sharif provincial government was formed by Shehbaz Sharif in 2008 to begin a new government following the 2008 Pakistani general election.

== Cabinet ==
=== Ministers ===
- Malik Nadeem Kamran
- Ehsan ud Din Qureshi
- Malik Muhammad Iqbal Channar
- Rana Sanaullah Khan
- Mian Mujtaba Shuja ur Rehman
- Dost Muhammad Khosa
- Kamran Michael
- Raja Riaz Ahmad Khan
- Tanveer Ashraf Kaira
- Ehsan ud Din Qureshi
