= Malik Ahmad Khan Bhachar =

Pakistani politician

Leader of the Opposition in the Provincial Assembly of the Punjab
- In office 20 March 2024 – 28 July 2025
- Leader of the House: Maryam Nawaz
- Succeeded by: Muhammad Moeen Ud Din Riaz

Member of the Provincial Assembly of the Punjab
- In office 16 October 2018 – 28 July 2024
- Constituency: PP-87 Mianwali-III
- In office 29 May 2013 – 31 May 2018
- Constituency: PP-45 (Mianwali-III)

Personal details
- Born: 19 April 1968 (age 58) Wan Bhachran, Punjab, Pakistan
- Party: PTI (2013-present)

Punjab Assembly Lahore

Malik Ahmad Khan Bhachar is a Pakistani politician who currently serves as the Leader of the Opposition in the Provincial Assembly of the Punjab since his appointment by the Pakistan Tehreek-e-Insaf (PTI) and Sunni Ittehad Council (SIC) from 20 March 2024 to 28 July 2025.

He was de-seated by the Election Commission of Pakistan (ECP), on same date when Nawaz Sharif disqualified for Panama Papers leaks.

He had been a member of the Provincial Assembly of the Punjab from October 2018 till January 2023. Previously he was member of the Punjab Assembly from May 2013 to May 2018. He is also an agriculturalist and businessman.

== Early life and education ==
He was born on 19 April 1968 in Wan Bhachran, Mianwali District, Punjab, Pakistan.

He graduated in 1989 from University of the Punjab and has a degree of Bachelor of Arts.

== Political career ==
He was elected to the Provincial Assembly of the Punjab as a candidate of Pakistan Tehreek-e-Insaf (PTI) from PP-45 (Mianwali-III) in the 2013 Punjab provincial election. He received 59,746 votes and defeated Ali Haider Noor Khan Niazi.

In 2018, he was allocated the PTI ticket to contest the 2018 Punjab provincial election from PP-87 (Mianwali-III), but the election was postponed in the constituency following the death of a contesting candidate.

He was re-elected to the Provincial Assembly of the Punjab as a candidate of the PTI from PP-87 (Mianwali-III) on 12 October 2018. He was elected unopposed after rest of the contesting candidates withdrew. He also served as Parliamentary Secretary for Local Government & Community Development in Punjab.

He won the seat in the Provincial Assembly from PP-87 Mianwali-III as a candidate of the PTI in the 2024 Punjab provincial election. He was forced to run as an Independent alongside other PTI candidates but was able to win his seat. He then declared his affiliation under the Sunni Ittehad Council (SIC) with other PTI members.

On 20 March, SIC nominated him as the temporary opposition leader in the Punjab Assembly. Opposition leader candidate Mian Aslam Iqbal was unable to take the oath as a member of the assembly due to threats of an arrest, hence Bachar is serving as the Opposition leader until Mian Aslam Iqbal is able to hold the post.

As opposition leader he criticized Chief Minister of Punjab, Maryam Nawaz for bad leadership and labeled her a “TikToker.” He also claimed the PMLN and several institutions had rigged the 2024 Pakistani general election using Form 47s.

On 28 July 2025, Election Commission of Pakistan disqualified him due to his conviction in 9 May cases.
