= Malik Muhammad Anwar =

Pakistani politician (born 1950)

Provincial Minister of Punjab for Revenue
- In office 29 August 2018 – April 2022

Member of the Provincial Assembly of the Punjab
- In office 15 August 2018 – 14 January 2023
- Constituency: PP-4 Attock-IV

Personal details
- Born: April 25, 1950 (age 76) Pindigheb, Attock District, Pakistan
- Party: PTI (2018-present)
- Other political affiliations: PML(Q) (2002)

Malik Muhammad Anwar is a Pakistani politician who had been a member of the Provincial Assembly of the Punjab from August 2018 till January 2023.

== Early life and education ==
He was born on 25 April 1950 in Pindi Gheb, Attock District.

He completed his graduation from the University of the Punjab in 2002 and has a degree of Bachelor of Arts.

He joined Pakistan Army in 1970 and retired with the rank of Colonel in 1997.

== Political career ==
He was elected to the Provincial Assembly of the Punjab as a candidate of Pakistan Muslim League (Q) (PML-Q) from PP-18 Attock-IV in the 2002 Punjab provincial election. He received 51,692 votes and defeated Sardar Salim Haider Khan. In January 2003, he was inducted into the provincial Punjab cabinet of Chief Minister Pervaiz Elahi and was made Provincial Minister of Punjab for Cooperatives.

He was re-elected to the Provincial Assembly of the Punjab as a candidate of the Pakistan Tehreek-e-Insaf (PTI) from PP-4 Attock-IV in the 2018 Punjab provincial election.

On 27 August 2018, he was inducted into the provincial Punjab cabinet of Chief Minister Sardar Usman Buzdar without any ministerial portfolio. On 29 August 2018, he was appointed Provincial Minister of Punjab for Revenue.

He ran for a seat in the Provincial Assembly from PP-4 Attock-IV as a candidate of the PTI in the 2023 Punjab provincial election.
