= Mian Muhammad Akram Usman =

Pakistani politician

Mian Muhammad Akram Usman (born 2 December 1976) is a Pakistani politician who served as a member of the Provincial Assembly of Punjab from 2022 to 2023.

== Early life and education ==
Mian Muhammad Akram Usman was born on 2 December 1976 in Lahore, Pakistan, to Mian Muhammad Usman, who served as a member of the National Assembly. He graduated from the University of the Punjab in 1997.

== Career ==
In February 2020, during Kashmir Solidarity Day, some banners displayed his image and a quote suggesting aggression towards Hindus, which led to backlash on social media. He later apologized, stating the message was mistakenly directed at Hindus instead of Indian Prime Minister Narendra Modi.

Usman was elected as a member of the Provincial Assembly of Punjab in a by-election held on 17 July 2022, for the seat previously held by Abdul Aleem Khan, who was de-notified on 23 May 2022, by the Election Commission of Pakistan under Article 63A(1)(b)(i) of the Constitution. He took his oath on 21 July 2022. In April 2023, Usman was announced as a candidate for the upcoming Punjab provincial election. The Friday Times criticized Usman's presence on the PTI party ticket as nepotism.

In December 2024, Usman received a two-year prison sentence from a military trial court for his alleged role in the May 9 riots.
