= Tahira Aurangzeb =

Pakistani politician

Member of the National Assembly of Pakistan
- Incumbent
- Assumed office 29 February 2024
- Constituency: Reserved seat for women
- In office 13 August 2018 – 10 August 2023
- Constituency: Reserved seat for women
- In office 1 June 2013 – 31 May 2018
- Constituency: Reserved seat for women
- In office 17 March 2008 – 16 March 2013
- Constituency: Reserved seat for women

Personal details
- Party: PMLN (2008-present)
- Spouse: Raja Aurangzeb Abbasi
- Relations: Najma Hameed (sister)
- Children: Marriyum Aurangzeb

Tahira Aurangzeb (Urdu: طاہرہ اورنگزیب) had been a member of the National Assembly of Pakistan from August 2018 till August 2023. Previously she was a member of the National Assembly from March 2008 to May 2018. She is mother of Marriyum Aurangzeb.

== Political career ==
She was elected to the National Assembly of Pakistan as a candidate of Pakistan Muslim League (N) (PML-N) on a seat reserved for women from Punjab in the 2008 Pakistani general election. The 2007-2008 report of Transparency International revealed she has declared assets of over 17 million PKR. She actively promoted her relatives on prominent posts in government including her sister Najma Hameed and her daughter Maryam Aurangzeb to reserved seats for women.

She was re elected to the National Assembly as a candidate of PML-N on a reserved seat for women from Punjab in the 2013 Pakistani general election and the 2018 Pakistani general election.
