= Najma Hameed =

Pakistani politician (1944–2022)

Member of the Senate of Pakistan
- In office March 2009 – March 2021

Personal details
- Born: 18 March 1944 Multan, Punjab, British India
- Died: 2 December 2022 (aged 78) Rawalpindi, Punjab, Pakistan
- Party: Pakistan Muslim League (N)

Najma Hameed (Urdu: نجمہ حمید; 18 March 1944 – 2 December 2022) was a Pakistani politician who served as a member of Senate of Pakistan from 2009 to 2021, representing Pakistan Muslim League (N).

== Political career ==
Hameed was elected to the Senate of Pakistan as a candidate of Pakistan Muslim League (N) on reserved seat for women in the 2009 Pakistani Senate election. She was the sister of Tahira Aurangzeb and was the aunt of Marriyum Aurangzeb.

Hameed was re-elected to the Senate of Pakistan as a candidate of Pakistan Muslim League (N) on reserved seat for women in the 2015 Pakistani Senate election.

== Personal life and death ==
Hameed died on 2 December 2022, at the age of 78.
