= PP-87 Mianwali-III =

Constituency of Pakistan

- Constituency for the Provincial Assembly of Punjab
- Region: Mianwali Tehsil (partly) including Mianwali city of Mianwali District

Current constituency
- Member: Ali haider noor khan niazi
- Created from: PP-45 Mianwali-III (2002-2018); PP-87 Mianwali-III (2018-)

PP-87 Mianwali-III (پی پی-87، مِيانوالى-3) is a Constituency of Provincial Assembly of Punjab.

== By-election 2025 ==
A by-election will be held on 18 September 2025 due to the disqualification of Malik Ahmad Khan Bhachar, the previous member from this seat.

By-election 2025: PP-87 Mianwali-III
Party	Candidate	Votes	%	±%
PML(N)	Ali Haider Noor Khan Niazi	67,986	90.00	
IPP	Muhammad Ayaz Khan Niazi	6,371	8.43	
Others	Others (four candidates)	1,186	1.57	
Turnout		76,493	27.00	
Total valid votes		75,543	98.76	
Rejected ballots		950	1.24	
Majority		61,615	81.57	
Registered electors		283,272		
hold				

== General elections 2024 ==
Provincial election 2024: PP-87 Mianwali-III
Party	Candidate	Votes	%	±%
Independent	Malik Ahmad Khan Bhachar (Note: Filed nomination papers as PTI candidate but ECP allowed him to run as an Independent)	107,278	70.96	
Independent	Sajjad Ahmad Malik	15,710	10.39	
PML(N)	Inaam Ullah Khan Niazi	13,478	8.92	
TLP	Qari Muhammad Shafa Ullah	5,325	3.52	
PPP	Muhammad Ayaz Khan	2,149	1.42	
Others	Others (seventeen candidates)	7,243	4.79	
Turnout		155,622	57.37	
Total valid votes		151,183	97.15	
Rejected ballots		4,439	2.85	
Majority		91,568	60.57	
Registered electors		271,257		
hold				

== General elections 2018 ==
Malik Ahmad Khan Bhachar elected unopposed after rest of the contesting candidates withdrew.

== General elections 2013 ==
Provincial election 2013 : PP-45 Mianwali-III
Party	Candidate	Votes	%	±%
PTI	Ahmed Khan Bhachar	59,746	51.42	
PML(N)	Ali Haider Noor Khan Niazi	29,228	25.16	
Independent	Habib Ullah Khan Niazi	26,039	22.41	
Others	Others (seven candidates)	1,170	1.01	
Turnout		120,325	63.52	
Total valid votes		116,183	96.56	
Rejected ballots		4,142	3.44	
Majority		30,518	26.26	
Registered electors		189,434		
hold				

== General elections 2008 ==
Contesting candidates	Party affiliation	Votes polled

== See also ==
- PP-86 Mianwali-II
- PP-88 Mianwali-IV
