= Industries, commerce and investment department (Punjab, Pakistan) =

Pakistani provincial ministry

The Industries, Commerce and Investment Department (ICID) is a department of the Government of Punjab in Pakistan. The department promotes industrial development, trade and investment.

The department is headed by an elected minister as well as a secretary. Mian Muhammad Aslam Iqbal is the Provincial Minister of Punjab for Industries, Commerce and Investment since 27 August 2018.

== Related Departments ==
=== Punjab Consumer Protection Council ===
District Consumer Protection Councils and Consumer Courts were established in eleven districts of the province under The Punjab Consumer Protection Act 2005. Their goal is to resolve consumer issues.

=== Punjab Printing and Stationery Press ===
The Punjab Printing and Stationery Press is an attached organization. It provides printing and binding services to government organizations and has two presses:

- Government Printing Press, Lahore was established in 1878.
- Government Printing Press, Bahawalpur was established in 1869.

== Autonomous Bodies ==
=== Punjab Small Industries Corporation ===
Punjab Small Industries Corporation was established in 1973 under The Punjab Small Industries Corporation Act. The body contributes to small industrial development in the province.

== Companies ==
=== Punjab Board of Investment and Trade ===
Punjab Board of Investment & Trade (PBIT) is the trade and investment promotion agency.

=== Punjab Industrial Estate - Development And Management Company ===
Punjab Industrial Estates Development and Marketing Company was established in 2003 to develop and manage Industrial estates.

=== Faisalabad Industrial Estate Development Management Company ===
Faisalabad Industrial Estate Development & Management Company (FIEDMC) was established under the companies ordinance 1984 to develop Industrial estates.

== Special Institutions ==
=== Punjab Prices Supply Board ===
Established under The Price Control and Prevention of Profiteering and Hoarding Act, 1977 to check and monitor the prices of essential items.

== See also ==
- Ministry of Industries and Production
- Ministry of Commerce
- Economy of Punjab
- Quaid-E-Azam Business Park
