= Hasan Askari Rizvi =

Pakistani politician

Dr Hasan Askari Rizvi
- حسن عسکري رضوي

Former Chief Minister of Punjab
- Caretaker
- In office 8 June 2018 – 20 August 2018
- Governor: Malik Muhammad Rafique Rajwana
- Preceded by: Shehbaz Sharif
- Succeeded by: Sardar Usman Buzdar

Personal details
- Born: 1951 (age 74–75) Mandi Bahauddin, Punjab, Pakistan
- Citizenship: Pakistan
- Education: Government College University, Lahore; Punjab University; University of Leeds; University of Pennsylvania
- Known for: Work in arms control, policy of Pakistan's nuclear deterrence program, Civil-military relations, and politics
- Awards: Sitara-e-Imtiaz (Star of Excellence) Award (2010); Government of Pakistan

Hassan Askari Rizvi (Urdu: حسن عسکري رضوي) (SI), is a Pakistani political scientist and military analyst who served as caretaker Chief Minister of Punjab, Pakistan in 2018. He is noted for his work in comparative politics, nuclear weapons and the country's domestic policy.

He has also served as professor emeritus of political science at the Punjab University, Lahore. He regularly appears on the country's various news channels to comment on the political and domestic situation. He also was a lecturer at the Virtual University of Pakistan. He is considered to have experience working with international think tanks, universities, Pakistani and foreign news media.

== Early life and education ==
Hassan Askari Rizvi, born into a Shia family in Mandi Bahauddin, Punjab, attended the Punjab University in Lahore where he studied political science, sociology, Urdu and English literature from 1960 to 1968. He gained BA (with honours) in Political science and English literature in 1968 from the Punjab University. In 1970, he attained MA in political science and proceeded his studies of United Kingdom. Rizvi received MPhil on the basis of publishing his thesis on South Asia and comparative government.

In 1979, he earned MA in international relations (IR) from the University of Pennsylvania, followed by PhD in political science from the University of Pennsylvania in 1980.

== Academic career ==
He was a visiting professor of Pakistan studies at the Columbia University from January 1996 to July 1999. He also served as the Allama Iqbal Professor at Heidelberg University of Germany from 1988 to 1991. Upon returning to Pakistan, he has regularly appeared on country's news channels to comment and discuss on country's nuclear weapons politics, national political and domestic situation of the Afghanistan and South Asia. He has spent over 35 years teaching and supervising research at the post-graduate level.

== Political career ==
=== Caretaker Chief Minister of Punjab (2018) ===
He was nominated by the opposition Pakistan Tehreek-e-Insaf after they rejected their own previous nominee Nasir Mahmood Khosa on whom government of Shehbaz Sharif was in agreement. As a result, he was nominated as caretaker chief minister of Punjab by the Election Commission of Pakistan. Consensus on Rizvi could not be reached between government and opposition and the matter was decided by Election Commission of Pakistan. Pakistan Muslim League (N) was critical of this selection. However, Hasan Askari committed to ensure free and fair elections in the province.

== Publications ==
A prolific author, he has written "more than 1,800 op-eds and comment pieces in domestic and international newspapers and magazines".

His books include:

=== Books ===
- Rizvi, Hasan-Askari (2000). Military, State and Society in Pakistan. Basingstoke [u.a.]: Macmillan [u.a.] ISBN 978-0312231934.
- Rizvi, Hasan-Askari (2000). The military and politics in Pakistan: 1947 – 1997. Lahore: Sang-e-Meel Publications. p. 382. ISBN 978-9693511482.
- Rizvi, Hasan-Askari (1993). Pakistan and the geostrategic environment : a study of foreign policy. Basingstoke, Hampshire u.a.: Macmillan u.a. ISBN 978-0333565544.
- Rizvi, Hasan-Askari (2004). Pakistan's Foreign Policy: An Overview 1947–2004 (PDF). Islamabad: Pakistan Institute of Legislative Development Press. Archived from the original (PDF) on 23 June 2012.
- Pakistan: Political & Constitutional Engineering - Hasan Askari Rizvi https://sangemeel.shop/products/pakistan-political-constitutional-engineering-hasan-askari-rizvi?pr_prod_strat=e5_desc&pr_rec_id=65cb001f3&pr_rec_pid=8475261403385&pr_ref_pid=2378116694078&pr_seq=uniform

== Awards and recognition ==
- Sitara-i-Imtiaz (Star of Excellence) by the Government of Pakistan in 2010.

Political offices Chief Minister of Punjab
Preceded by Shehbaz Sharif	Caretaker; 2018 - 2018	Succeeded by Sardar Usman Buzdar
