= Chaudhry Sher Ali Khan =

Pakistani politician

Member of the Provincial Assembly of the Punjab
- Incumbent
- Assumed office 23 February 2024
- Constituency: PP-4 Attock-IV
- In office 29 May 2013 – 31 May 2018
- Constituency: PP-17 Attock-IV
- In office 2008–2013
- Constituency: PP-18 Attock-IV

Personal details
- Born: 24 July 1961 (age 65) Rawalpindi, Punjab, Pakistan
- Party: PMLN (2008-present)

Chaudry Sher Ali Khan is a Pakistani politician who is a Member of the Provincial Assembly of the Punjab, since 23 February 2024, having previously this post from 2008 to May 2018.

== Early life and education ==
He was born on 24 July 1961 in Rawalpindi.

He received his early education from Aitchison College. He has a degree of Bachelor of Science which he obtained in 1981 from F. G. Sir Syed College.

== Political career ==
He was elected to the Provincial Assembly of the Punjab as a candidate of Pakistan Muslim League (Q) (PML-Q) from Constituency PP-17 (Attock-III) in the 2008 Pakistani general election. He received 41,409 votes and defeated a candidate of Pakistan Peoples Party. He is cousin of Prince Malik Ata Muhammad Khan and Malik Saeed Muhammad Khan. In 2010, he left PML-Q to join Pakistan Muslim League (N) (PML-N).

He was re-elected to the Provincial Assembly of the Punjab as a candidate of PML-N from Constituency PP-18 (Attock-IV) in the 2013 Pakistani general election. In June 2013, he was inducted into the provincial cabinet of Chief Minister Shahbaz Sharif and was made Provincial Minister of Punjab for Energy with the additional portfolio of Mines and Mineral. He remained Minister for Energy until November 2013.

He was re-elected to Provincial Assembly of Punjab for third time in the 2024 Pakistani National Elections, as a candidate of PML-N received 48,593 votes.
