= Sardar Fateh Buzdar =

Pakistani politician (1945–2019)

Sardar Fateh Muhammad Buzdar

Member of the Provincial Assembly of the Punjab
- In office 2002–2013
- Constituency: PP-241 (Dera Ghazi Khan-II)
- In office 1985–1988
- Constituency: PP-241 (Dera Ghazi Khan-II)

Personal details
- Born: 1945 Dera Ghazi Khan District
- Died: April 1, 2019 (aged 73–74) Tonsa, Pakistan
- Party: Pakistan Muslim League (Q)
- Children: 10 including Sardar Usman Buzdar

Sardar Fateh Muhammad Khan Buzdar (1945 – 1 April 2019) was a Pakistani politician who was a member of the Provincial Assembly of the Punjab from 1985 to 1988 and from 2002 to 2013. He was Tumandar of the Buzdar tribe.

== Early life and education ==
He was born in Barthi, a backward tribal area of Dera Ghazi Khan District. He obtained an MA political science degree from University of Karachi in 1964.

== Political career ==
He was elected to the Provincial Assembly of the Punjab as an independent candidate in the 1985 Pakistani general election.

He was re-elected to the Provincial Assembly of the Punjab as a candidate of Pakistan Muslim League (Q) (PML-Q) from PP-241 (Dera Ghazi Khan-II) in the 2002 Pakistani general election.

He also won re-election from the same constituency on a PML-Q ticket in the 2008 Pakistani general election.
