= Leader of the Opposition in the Provincial Assembly of the Punjab =

Pakistani constitutional position

Leader of the Opposition of Punjab

- Incumbent; Muhammad Moeen Ud Din Riaz since 8 October 2025
- Style: The Honorable (formal); Leader of the Opposition (spoken)
- Member of: Provincial Assembly of Punjab
- Reports to: Provincial Assembly of Punjab
- Term length: While leader of the largest political party in the Provincial Assembly that is not in government
- Constituting instrument: Constitution of Pakistan
- Formation: 7 May 1951
- First holder: Iftikhar Hussain Khan Mamdot

The Leader of the Opposition of Punjab (Urdu: قائد حزب اختلاف پنجاب), is an elected politician who is, by Pakistani law, the leader of the Official Opposition in the Province of Punjab. The Leader of the Opposition leads the Opposition in the Provincial Assembly of Punjab. The Leader of the Opposition is the leader of the largest political party in the Provincial Assembly that is not in government. This is usually the leader of the second-largest political party in the Provincial Assembly. The current holder of the position is Malik Ahmad Khan Bhachar of the Pakistan Tehreek-e-Insaf.

== Former Leaders of the Opposition Punjab ==
=== Before independence (1937-1947) ===
S.No.	Portrait	Name (birth-death) (Constituency)	Tenure		Party	Election	Government	
S.No.	Portrait	Name (birth-death) (Constituency)	Took office	Left office	Party	Election	Premier	Party
1		Gopi Chand Bhargava (1899–1966) (Lahore City)	5 April 1937	1940	Indian National Congress	1937	Sikandar Hayat Khan (1937–1942) Malik Khizar Hayat Tiwana (1942–1945)	Unionist Party
2		Sardar Sampuran Singh (N/A) (Lyallpur-Sikh-Rural)	1940	1942	Shiromani Akali Dal	1937	Sikandar Hayat Khan (1937–1942) Malik Khizar Hayat Tiwana (1942–1945)	Unionist Party
3		Bhim Sen Sachar (1894–1978) (N-W Town)	1942	5 February 1945	Indian National Congress	1937	Sikandar Hayat Khan (1937–1942) Malik Khizar Hayat Tiwana (1942–1945)	Unionist Party
–	Vacant (Assembly under dissolution)		5 February 1945	21 March 1946	-			
4		Iftikhar Hussain Khan (1906–1969) (Ferozpur General)	21 March 1946	2 March 1947	All-India Muslim League	1946	Malik Khizar Hayat Tiwana	Unionist Party
–	Vacant (Assembly under dissolution)		2 March 1947	15 August 1947	-			

=== After Independence ===
Leader of the Opposition Punjab
Order	Leader of the Opposition Punjab	Party	Time Duration
1	Iftikhar Hussain Khan Mamdot	Jinnah Muslim League	7 May 1951 – 9 December 1952
2	Mian Abdul Bari Arain	All-Pakistan Awami League	9 December 1952 - 14 October 1955
3	Sardar Bahadur Khan	—	20 May 1956 - 7 October 1958
4	Khawaja Muhammad Safdar	—	6 December 1962 - 8 June 1965
5	Khawaja Muhammad Safdar	—	9 June 1965 - 25 March 1969
6	Allama Rehmatullah Arshad	—	3 May 1972 - 17 November 1975
7	Chaudhry Talib Hussain	—	17 November 1975 - 13 January 1977
8	Sardarzada Zaffar Abbas Syed	—	6 June 1977 - 5 July 1977
9	Makhdoom Hasan Mahmood	—	February 1986 - 26 August 1986
10	Mian Muhammad Afzal Hayat	—	4 October 1986 - 30 May 1988
11	Farooq Leghari	Pakistan People's Party	2 December 1988 - 26 December 1988
12	Rana Shaukat Mehmood	Pakistan People's Party	27 December 1988 - 6 August 1990
13	Rana Ikram Rabbani	Pakistan People's Party	7 November 1990 - 28 June 1993
14	Mian Muhammad Shahbaz Sharif, (Chaudhry Pervez Elahi, Acting Leader of Opposition from 1993 to 1996)	Pakistan Muslim League (N)	October 1993 - 17 November 1996
15	Saeed Ahmed Khan	Pakistan Muslim League (Jinnah)	30 June 1997 - 12 October 1999
15	Qasim Zia	Pakistan People's Party	2002 - 2007
16	Chaudhry Zaheer Ud Din	Pakistan Muslim League (Q)	March 2007 - March 2011
17	Raja Riaz	Pakistan People's Party	2008 - 2013
18	Mehmood-ur-Rasheed	Pakistan Tehreek-e-Insaf	2013 - 2018
19	Hamza Shehbaz Sharif	Pakistan Muslim League (N)	6 September 2018 - 16 April 2022
20	Sibtain Khan	Pakistan Tehreek-e-Insaf	13 June 2022 - 27 July 2022
21	Hamza Shehbaz Sharif	Pakistan Muslim League (N)	20 October 2022 - 14 January 2023
22	Malik Ahmad Khan Bhachar	Sunni Ittehad Council	20 March 2024 - 28 July 2024
18	Moeen Ud Din Riaz	Pakistan Tehreek-e-Insaf (Note: Officially designated as independent)	8 October 2025 - present

== See also ==
- Provincial Assembly of Punjab
- Governor of Punjab
- Chief Minister of Punjab
- Senior Minister of Punjab (Pakistan)
- Speaker of the Provincial Assembly of Punjab
- Chief Secretary Punjab
