= NA-145 (Okara-III) =

Former constituency of the National Assembly of Pakistan

- Former constituency for the National Assembly of Pakistan
- Region: Okara District

Former constituency
- Created: 2002
- Abolished: 2018
- Replaced by: NA-141 (Okara-I) and NA-143 (Okara-III).

NA-145 (Okara-III) (Urdu: این اے-۱۴۵، اوكاڑه-۳) was a constituency for the National Assembly of Pakistan, mainly comprising Renala Khurd Tehsil. After the 2018 delimitations, it was abolished, and its areas were included in the constituencies of NA-141 (Okara-I) and NA-143 (Okara-III).

== Election 2002 ==
General elections were held on 10 Oct 2002. Syed Gulzair Sabtain Shah of PML-Q won by 39,391 votes.

General election 2002: NA-145 Okara-III
Party	Candidate	Votes	%	±%
PML(Q)	Syed Gulzar Sabtain Shah	39,391	36.04	
Independent	Syed Sumsan Ali Shah Bukhari	38,687	35.40	
PPP	Ch. Muhammad Sajjad	20,171	18.46	
PML(N)	Syed Javed Hassan	6,858	6.28	
NA	Syed Shah Nawaz Karmani	4,014	3.67	
Independent	Ikhlaq Anmed Rao	164	0.15	
Turnout		112,049	46.34	
Total valid votes		109,285	97.53	
Rejected ballots		2,764	2.47	
Majority		704	0.64	
Registered electors		241,786		

== Election 2008 ==
General elections were held on 18 Feb 2008. Syed Sumsam Ali S. Bukhari of PPP won by 64,607 votes.

General election 2008: NA-145 Okara-III
Party	Candidate	Votes	%	±%
PPP	Syed Sumsan Ali Shah Bukhari	64,607	49.87	
PML(Q)	Syed Gulzar Sabtain Shah	42,761	33.01	
PML(N)	Syed Javed Hassan	21,253	16.41	
Others	Others (three candidates)	933	0.71	
Turnout		133,777	46.59	
Total valid votes		129,554	96.84	
Rejected ballots		4,223	3.16	
Majority		21,846	16.86	
Registered electors		287,122		

== Election 2013 ==
General elections were held on 11 May 2013. Syed Muhammad Ashiq Hussain Shah of PML-N won by 89,025 votes and became the member of National Assembly.

General election 2013: NA-145 Okara-III
Party	Candidate	Votes	%	±%
PML(N)	Syed Muhammad Ashiq Hussain	89,025	52.19	
Independent	Rana Khizar Hayat Khan	31,659	18.52	
PPP	Syed Sumsan Ali Shah Bukhari	26,601	15.56	
PTI	Syed Ali Husnain Shah	12,319	7.21	
TTP	Rao Wajid Ali Khan	4,852	2.84	
Independent	Syed Muhammad Mehdi	4,185	2.45	
Others	Others (six candidates)	2,298	1.23	
Turnout		177,716	60.57	
Total valid votes		170,939	96.19	
Rejected ballots		6,777	3.81	
Majority		57,366	33.67	
Registered electors		293,394		
