= Tumandar =

Pakistani tribal title

Tumandar (Urdu: تُمن دار) is a title given to chiefs of the Baloch tribes in Pakistan.

As defined in the Gazette of Pakistan, historically, a "Tumandar" or "Sardar" who is accepted as the leader of a tribe, under any custom or usage or otherwise could obtain free labour from other persons or compel them to work against their will — this was abolished in 1976.

== Cases ==
- Nawab Akbar Shahbaz Khan Bugti (12 July 1927 – 26 August 2006) was the Tumandar (head) of the Bugti tribe.
- In Rajanpur, Sardar Balakh Sher Mazari is the Tumandar and the Paramount Sardar of the Mazari tribe.
- In Dera Ghazi Khan, Sardar Zulfiqar Khosa is the Tumandar and the Paramount Sardar of the Khosa tribe.
- in Dera Ghazi Khan, Sardar Usman Buzdar is the Tumandar and Paramount Sardar of the Buzdar tribe
