= Dhaghano Bozdar =

Coordinates: 25.4500°N 68.7167°E

Dhingano Bozdar
- Union council
- Dhingano Bozdar is located in the east of the district.
- Interactive map of Dhingano Bozdar
- Country: Pakistan
- Province: Sindh
- District: Tando Allahyar
- Tehsil: Tando Allahyar

Government
  - Nazim: ABDUL AZIZ

Population
  - Total: 56,892

Dhingano Bozdar is a town and Union Council of Tando Allahyar District in the Sindh Province of Pakistan. The Union Council has a population of 56,892.
