= Muhammad Moeen Ud Din Riaz =

Pakistani politician

Muhammad Moeen Ud Din Riaz is a Pakistani politician who has been a Member of the Provincial Assembly of the Punjab since 2024.

== Political career ==
He was elected to the Provincial Assembly of the Punjab as a Pakistan Tehreek-e-Insaf-backed independent candidate from constituency PP-215 Multan-III in the 2024 Pakistani general election.

On 2 October 2025, he was appointed as the opposition leader in Punjab assembly after disqualification of Malik Ahmad Khan Bhachar in May 9 cases.
