= Ehsan ud Din Qureshi =

Pakistani politician

Provincial Minister for Religious Affairs, Auqaf & Bait-ul-Maal
- In office 2008–2013

Member of the Provincial Assembly of Punjab
- In office 2013–2018
- Constituency: PP-216 (Multan IV)
- In office 2008–2013
- Constituency: PP-216 (Multan IV)
- In office 1997–1999
- Constituency: PP-216 (Multan IV)
- In office 1993–1996
- Constituency: PP-216 (Multan IV)

Municipal Councillor
- In office 1983–1991

Personal details
- Born: 1 January 1954 Multan
- Died: 30 August 2026 (aged 72) Multan, Punjab, Pakistan
- Party: Pakistan Muslim League (Nawaz)

Ehsan ud Din Qureshi (1 January 1954 - 30 August 2026) was a Pakistani politician who was a Member of the Provincial Assembly of the Punjab, for 5 terms, he also remained a Provincial Minister in 2008 and a Municipal Councillor, Municipal Committee Multan in 1983-91

== Early life and education ==
He was born on 1 January 1954 in Multan.

He has a degree of Bachelor of Arts which he obtained in 2003 from University of Sindh.

== Political career ==
He was elected to the Provincial Assembly of the Punjab as a candidate of Pakistan Muslim League (Nawaz) from Constituency PP-216 (Multan-IV).
