= Barthi, Bangladesh =

Barthi বার্থী
- Village
- Location in Bangladesh
- Coordinates: 22°02′10″N 90°12′30″E
- Country: Bangladesh
- Division: Barisal Division
- District: Barisal District
- Upazila: Gournadi Upazila

Area
  - Total: 3.81 km^{2} (1.47 sq mi)

Population (2022)
  - Total: 2,993
  - Density: 786/km^{2} (2,030/sq mi)
- Time zone: UTC+6 (Bangladesh Time)

Barthi is a village in Gournadi Upazila of Barisal District in the Barisal Division of southern-central Bangladesh.

== Demography ==
According to the 2022 Census of Bangladesh, Barthi had 755 households and a population of 2,993. It has a total area of 3.81 km^{2} (1.47 sq mi).
