= Fayyaz ul Hassan Chohan =

Pakistani politician

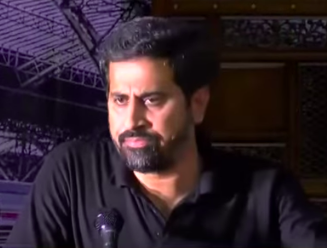
- Fayyaz ul Hassan Chohan in 2018

Spokesperson Government of The Punjab
- In office 6 August 2022 – 14 January 2023
- Governor: Muhammad Baligh Ur Rehman
- Chief Minister: Chaudhry Pervaiz Elahi
- In office 13 August 2021 – 6 October 2021
- Governor: Chaudhry Sarwar
- Chief Minister: Usman Buzdar

Provincial Minister of Punjab for Colonies
- In office 6 July 2019 – 21 December 2020
- Governor: Chaudhry Mohammad Sarwar
- Chief Minister: Usman Buzdar

Provincial Minister of Punjab for Information and Culture
- In office 2 December 2019 – 2 November 2020
- Governor: Chaudhry Sarwar
- Chief Minister: Usman Buzdar
- In office 27 August 2018 – 5 March 2019
- Governor: Chaudhry Sarwar
- Chief Minister: Usman Buzdar

Member of the Provincial Assembly of the Punjab
- In office 15 August 2018 – 14 January 2023
- Constituency: PP-17 Rawalpindi-XII
- In office 2002–2007
- Constituency: Rawalpindi

Provincial Minister of Punjab for Prisons
- In office 3 November 2020 – April 2022

Personal details
- Born: 21 May 1970 (age 56) Faisalabad, Punjab, Pakistan

Fayaz-ul-Hasan Chohan is a Pakistani politician who had been a member of the Provincial Assembly of the Punjab from August 2018 till January 2023. He was also the Official Spokesperson to the Chief Minister of Punjab and President of the Directorate General Public Relations. He has previously served as Provincial Minister of Punjab for Information, Culture, Colonies and Prisons from 27 August 2018 till 30 March 2020.

== Early life and education ==
He was born on 21 May 1970 in Lahore capital of Punjab, Pakistan in a Chohan family of the Gujjar tribe.

He received the degree of Master's in Economics from the University of Punjab, Lahore, in 1994 and is a software engineer by profession.

== Political career ==
Associated with the Jamaat-e-Islami, he was elected to the Provincial Assembly of the Punjab as a candidate of Muttahida Majlis-e-Amal (MMA) from PP-14 (Rawalpindi-XIV) in the 2002 Punjab provincial election. He received 13,738 votes and defeated Rashid Naseem Abbasi, a candidate of Pakistan Peoples Party (PPP). From 12 August 2003 till dissolution of assembly in 2007, he was the Chairperson of Standing Committee on Social Welfare, Women Development and Bait-ul-Maal and member of Standing Committee on Revenue, Relief & Consolidation.

He ran for the seat of the Provincial Assembly of the Punjab as a candidate of Pakistan Muslim League (Q) (PML-Q) from PP-14 (Rawalpindi-XIV) in the 2008 Punjab provincial election but was unsuccessful. He received 4,166 votes and lost the seat to Hanif Abbasi.

He was re-elected to the Provincial Assembly of the Punjab as a candidate of the Pakistan Tehreek-e-Insaf (PTI) from PP-17 Rawalpindi-XII in the 2018 Punjab provincial election. He received 40,919 votes and defeated Raja Abdul Hanif.

On 27 August 2018, he was inducted into the provincial Punjab cabinet of Chief Minister Sardar Usman Buzdar and was appointed Provincial Minister of Punjab for information and culture.

He resigned as Provincial Minister of Punjab for Information and Culture on 5 March 2019 after intense criticism over his offensive remarks against the Hindu community.

On 5 July 2019 he was re-inducted into Provincial Punjab Cabinet of Chief Minister Sardar Usman Buzdar and was appointed Provincial Minister of Punjab for Colonies.

On 2 December 2019, he was again appointed Provincial Minister of Punjab for Information and Culture. On 2 December 2020, he was removed from his post of Minister of Punjab for Information and Culture.

In November 2020, he was appointed Provincial Minister of Punjab for Prisons.

He served as the Official Spokesperson to the Chief Minister of Punjab and President of the Directorate General Public Relations, Government of Punjab.

He ran for a seat in the Provincial Assembly from PP-17 Rawalpindi-XII as a candidate of the IPP in the 2024 Punjab provincial election.

On 23 May 2023, Fayyaz ul Hassan Chohan decided to leave the Pakistan Tehreek-e-Insaf (PTI) party.

== Views ==
Shortly after becoming Provincial Minister of Punjab for information and culture in August 2018, he stirred a controversy when he used obscene language against TV channel staff during an interview on 30 August 2018. The same day, he was videotaped passing "vulgar and derogatory misogynistic remarks" against female artists of Lollywood. Both incidents earned him severe criticism.

Fayyaz resigned in March 2019 from the Punjab provincial cabinet after some of his remarks in the wake of India-Pakistan conflict in 2019. In order to highlight how exalted his motherland Pakistan is vis-a-vis India, he downgraded Indians using vulgar and derogatory comments. This was particularly derogatory to the Hindu community of his country. He was asked for a clarification from Pakistan Punjab Province Chief Minister Sardar Usman Buzdar and Prime Minister Imran Khan. Chohan apologised for his derogatory remarks and insisted that his remarks were aimed at Indian armed forces and Indian government and not against any Hindu community. Though Chohan apologized, he had to resign from the cabinet. Later on, he served as provincial information minister for Punjab government until his removal on 2 November 2020 and appointment as Minister for colonies.
