= PP-4 Attock-IV =

Constituency of the Punjabi Provincial Legislature, Pakistan

- Constituency for the Provincial Assembly of Punjab
- Region: Fateh Jang Tehsil (partly) excluding Fateh Jang town and Pindi Gheb Tehsil (partly) of Attock District

Current constituency
- Replaced by: PP-18 Attock-IV

PP-4 Attock-IV (پی پی-4، اٹک-4) is a Constituency of Provincial Assembly of Punjab.

== General elections 2024 ==
Provincial election 2024: PP-4 Attock-IV
Party	Candidate	Votes	%	±%
PML(N)	Sher Ali Khan	48,967	28.02	
TLP	Malik Amanat Khan	44,239	25.31	
Independent	Sardar Shah Nawaz Khan (Note: Filed nomination papers as PTI candidate but ECP allowed him to run as an Independent)	38,593	22.08	
PPP	Malik Riasat Ali	27,449	15.70	
Independent	Muhammad Ali Hassan Raza	5,144	2.94	
Independent	Malik Muhammad Imran	2,604	1.49	
Others	Others (eleven candidates)	7,794	4.46	
Turnout		178,822	63.83	
Total valid votes		174,790	97.75	
Rejected ballots		4,032	2.25	
Majority		4,728	2.71	
Registered electors		280,147		
hold				

== General Election 2018 ==
In 2018 Pakistani general election, Malik Muhammad Anwar a ticket holder of PTI won PP-4 Attock IV election by taking 49,823 votes.

Provincial election 2018: PP-4 Attock-IV
Party	Candidate	Votes	%	±%
PTI	Malik Muhammad Anwar	49,823	31.43	
PML(N)	Sher Ali Khan	40,535	25.57	
TLP	Malik Amanat Khan	39,820	25.12	
Independent	Malik Riasat Ali	18,658	11.77	
PPP	Muhammad Akhter	9,712	6.13	
Turnout		162,846	66.91	
Total valid votes		158,548	97.36	
Rejected ballots		4,298	2.64	
Majority		9,288	5.86	
Registered electors		243,385		

== General elections 2013 ==
Provincial election 2013: PP-18 Attock-IV
Party	Candidate	Votes	%	±%
PML(N)	Sher Ali Khan	59,126	41.25	
PTI	Malik Muhammad Anwar	46,133	32.18	
Independent	Malik Amanat Khan	30,466	21.26	
PPP	Afzaal Hussain	5,461	3.81	
Others	Others (five candidates)	2,162	1.50	
Turnout		147,689	65.99	
Total valid votes		143,348	97.06	
Rejected ballots		4,341	2.94	
Majority		12,993	9.07	
Registered electors		223,791		

== General elections 2008 ==
Provincial election 2008: PP-18 Attock-IV
Party	Candidate	Votes	%	±%
PPP	Malik Khurram Ali Khan	56,682	47.94	
PML(Q)	Lt.Col (R) Malik Muhammad Anwar	48,792	41.27	
PML(N)	Asif Ali Malik	12,755	10.79	
Turnout		122,065	61.73	
Total valid votes		118,229	96.86	
Rejected ballots		3,836	3.14	
Majority		7,890	6.67	
Registered electors		197,730		

== See also ==
- PP-3 Attock-III
- PP-5 Attock-V
