= Constituency PP-155 =

Constituency of the Punjabi Provincial Legislature, Pakistan

PP-155 XIX Lahore Cantonment is a cantonment in Lahore, Pakistan.

== Governance ==
9 union councils are present in the Provincial Assembly Constituency.

Each union council represents 15,000 to 20,000 registered voters. PP-155 is a Cantonment Board area and is controlled and monitored by the Pakistani Army, so no local-body system exists.

The last election of local bodies was held in 1991.

The total number of registered voters was 164,446 in the 2008 election.

== Areas ==
Defence Housing Authority (DHA) Phase 1 to 5 and 8, Punjab Society, Sui Gass Society, Fort Villas are relatively developed, while Iqbal Park, Super Town, Al-Ameen Society, Nayab Sector are relatively undeveloped. Low income areas include Chungi Amer Sidhu, Fardous Park, Shaukat Town, Amer Sidhu Pind, Farooq Colony, Model Colony 1, 2, Qadri Colony, Peer Colony, and Keer Kot.

=== Rural areas ===
Many villages are present in the constituency. Some are developed and surrounded by DHA and other societies. But some have little infrastructure.

- Charer is surrounded by DHA.
- Keer Kot and Keer Khurad are surrounded by DHA phase 2, 3, 4 and other societies.
- Amersidhu is surrounded by DHA phase 2 and other societies.
- Koray is surrounded by DHA phase 3, main Walton road and other societies.
- Chung Khurad is sited at Charar drain and surrounded by DHA phase 4 and other societies.
- Manawala and Chacho Wali are at Badian road, surrounded by DHA phase 5 and other societies.
- Bhatta Kohar, Gohawam, Sehijpal, Malik Pur, Alpha Jhugian, Dair Pindi are all sited around the Airport road and 8 other societies.
- Bao Wala is at Barkee road and surrounded by DHA phase 8 and other societies.
- Jindra and Jindra Khurd are at main Barkee road and surrounded by DHA phase 6, 7 and 8.
- Durag Pura is at main Barkee road and surrounded by DHA phase 6, 7 and other societies.

== Elections ==
=== 2008 ===
- Registered voters: 164,446
- Votes polled: 57,914
- Valid votes: 57,834
- Rejected votes: 801
- Percentage of votes polled: 35.22%

==== MPA ====
Mian Naseer Ahmed was elected as Member of Provincial Assembly of the Punjab (MPA) in 2008. He belongs to the Pakistan Muslim League (N) (PML-N) political party. in 1985 Qazi Abdul hakeem elected as a member of provincial Assembly of the Punjab as an independent candidate.

==== Ranking of political parties ====
1. Pakistan Muslim League (N)
2. Pakistan Tehreek-e-Insaf
3. Pakistan Peoples Party Parliamentarians
4. Other parties

== External list ==
- "The Election Commission :: Untitled Page". July 26, 2011. Archived from the original on 2011-07-26.
- "Punjab Assembly | Members - Members' Directory". www.pap.gov.pk.
- "Welcome to Walton Cantonment Board". August 2, 2010. Archived from the original on 2010-08-02.
- "Parliamentary party list in national assembly". March 22, 2010. Archived from the original on 2010-03-22.
- Winning Candidates List Punjab
- "PP-155 Election 2013 Results Final - Vote PK". May 22, 2014. Archived from the original on 2014-05-22.
