= 2002 North-West Frontier Province provincial election =

Pakistani provincial election

- 10 October 2002

All 124 seats in the Provincial Assembly 63 seats needed for a majority

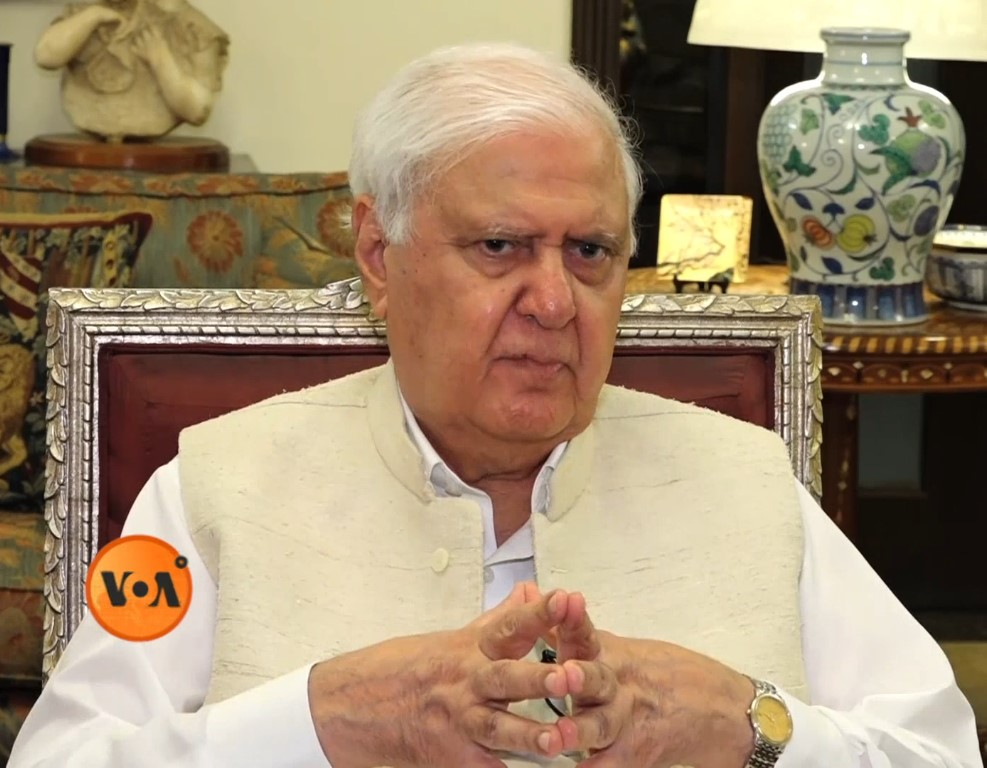

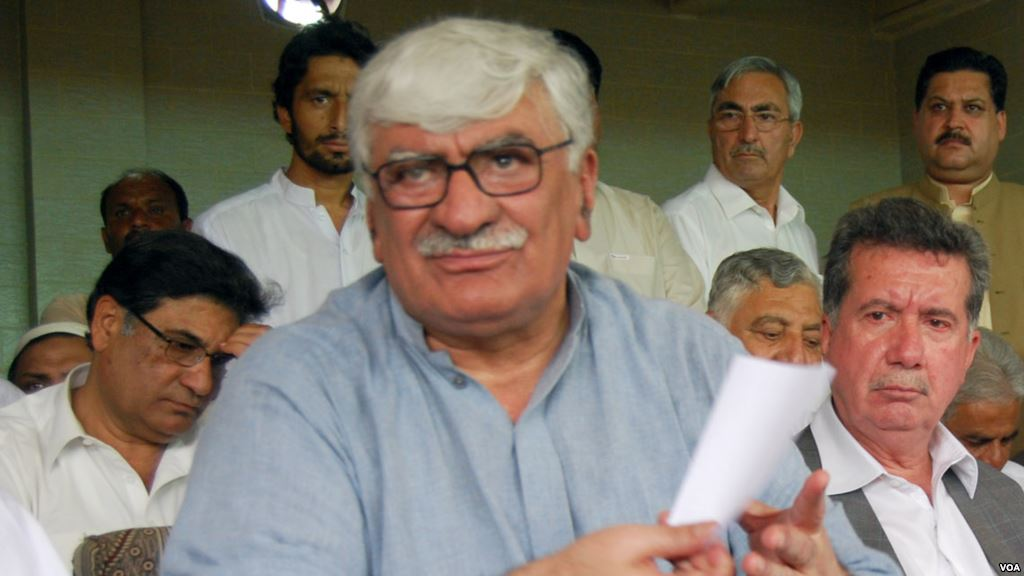
	First party	Second party	Third party
Leader	Akram Khan Durrani	Aftab Ahmed Sherpao	Asfandyar Wali Khan
Party	MMA	PPP-S	ANP
Leader's seat	Bannu-I	Charsadda-IV
Seats won	48	9	8
Popular vote	792,949	291,210	334,504
Percentage	26.39%	9.69%	11.13%
- Results by constituency
Chief Minister before election
Military rule
Pakistan Armed Forces
Elected Chief Minister
Akram Khan Durrani
MMA

Provincial elections were held in the Pakistani province of North-West Frontier Province to elect the members of the 8th Provincial Assembly of North-West Frontier Province on 10 October 2002, alongside nationwide general elections and three other provincial elections in Sindh, Balochistan and Punjab. The remaining two territories of Pakistan, AJK and Gilgit-Baltistan were ineligible to vote due to their disputed status. The elections were held under the military government of General Pervez Musharraf.

== Results ==
Party	Votes	%	Seats			
Party	Votes	%	General	Independents joined	Reserved for women	Reserved for non-Muslims
Muttahida Majlis-e-Amal	792,949	26.39	48	5	13	2
Pakistan Muslim League (Q)	435,444	14.49	7	2	2	–
Awami National Party	334,504	11.13	8	–	2	–
Pakistan Peoples Party (S)	291,210	9.69	9	1	2	1
Pakistan Muslim League (N)	277,683	9.24	4	–	1	–
Pakistan Peoples Party Parliamentarians	270,468	9.00	8	1	2	–
Pakistan Tehreek-e-Insaf	53,380	1.78	1	–	–	–
Other parties	109,550	3.65	0	–	–	–
Independents	439,258	14.62	14	-9	–	–
Total	3,004,446	100.00	99	0	22	3
Source: Free and Fair Election Network (FAFEN)
