= Barthi, Punjab =

Town in Pakistan

Barthi
- Union council and town
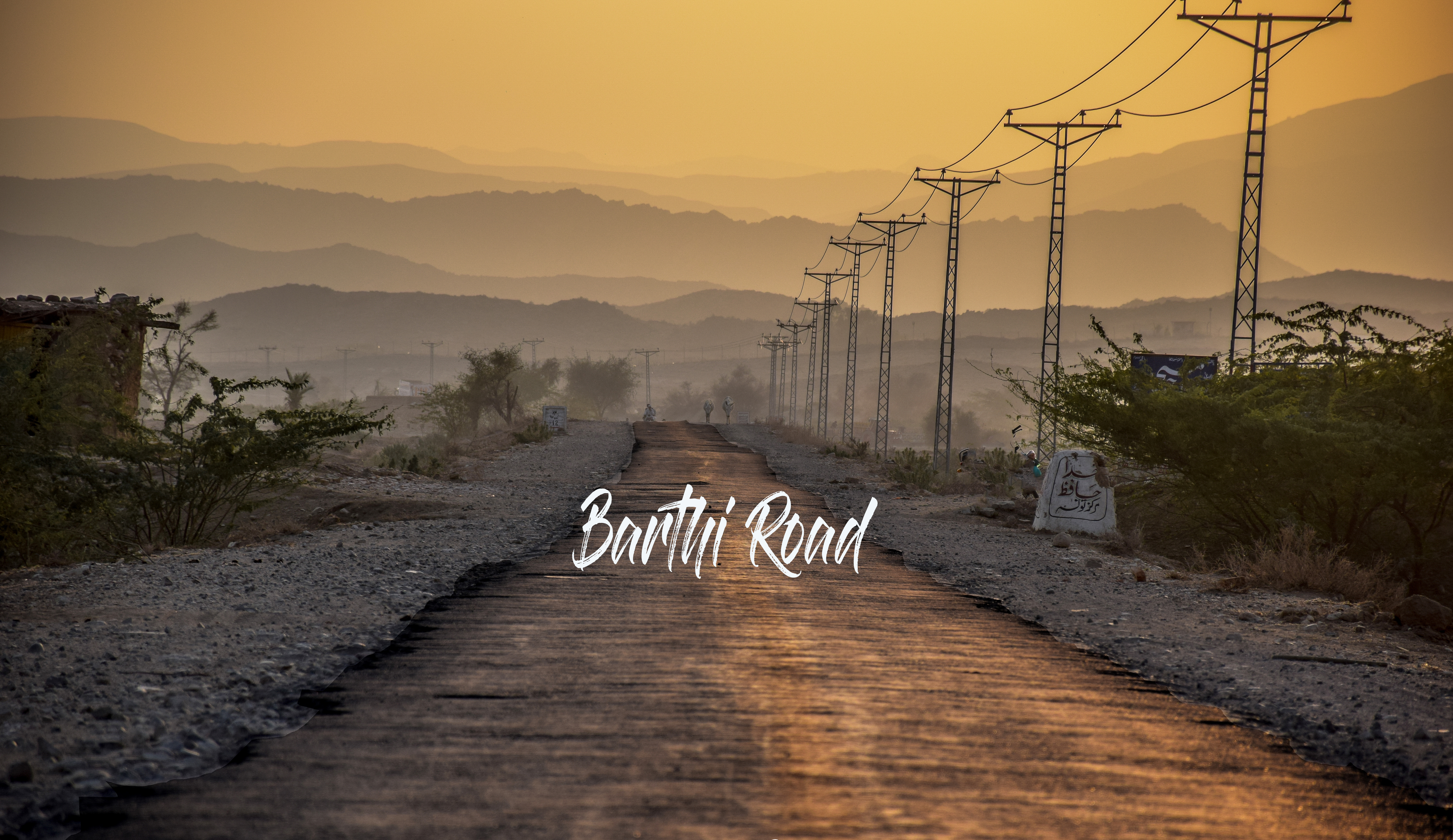

- Location in Pakistan
- Coordinates: 30°33′N 70°22′E
- Country: Pakistan
- Province: Punjab
- District: Dera Ghazi Khan District
- Elevation: 1,440 ft (439 m)
- Time zone: UTC+5 (PST)
  - Summer (DST): +6
- Postal code: 32124

Barthi (Urdu: بارتھی ) is a town and union council of Taunsa District in the Punjab province of Pakistan. It is located at an altitude of 439 metres (1443 feet).

Barthi is the birthplace of Usman Buzdar, a former Chief Minister of Punjab.
