= 2002 Punjab provincial election =

← 1997	10 October 2002	2008 →

All 371 seats in the Provincial Assembly 186 seats needed for a majority
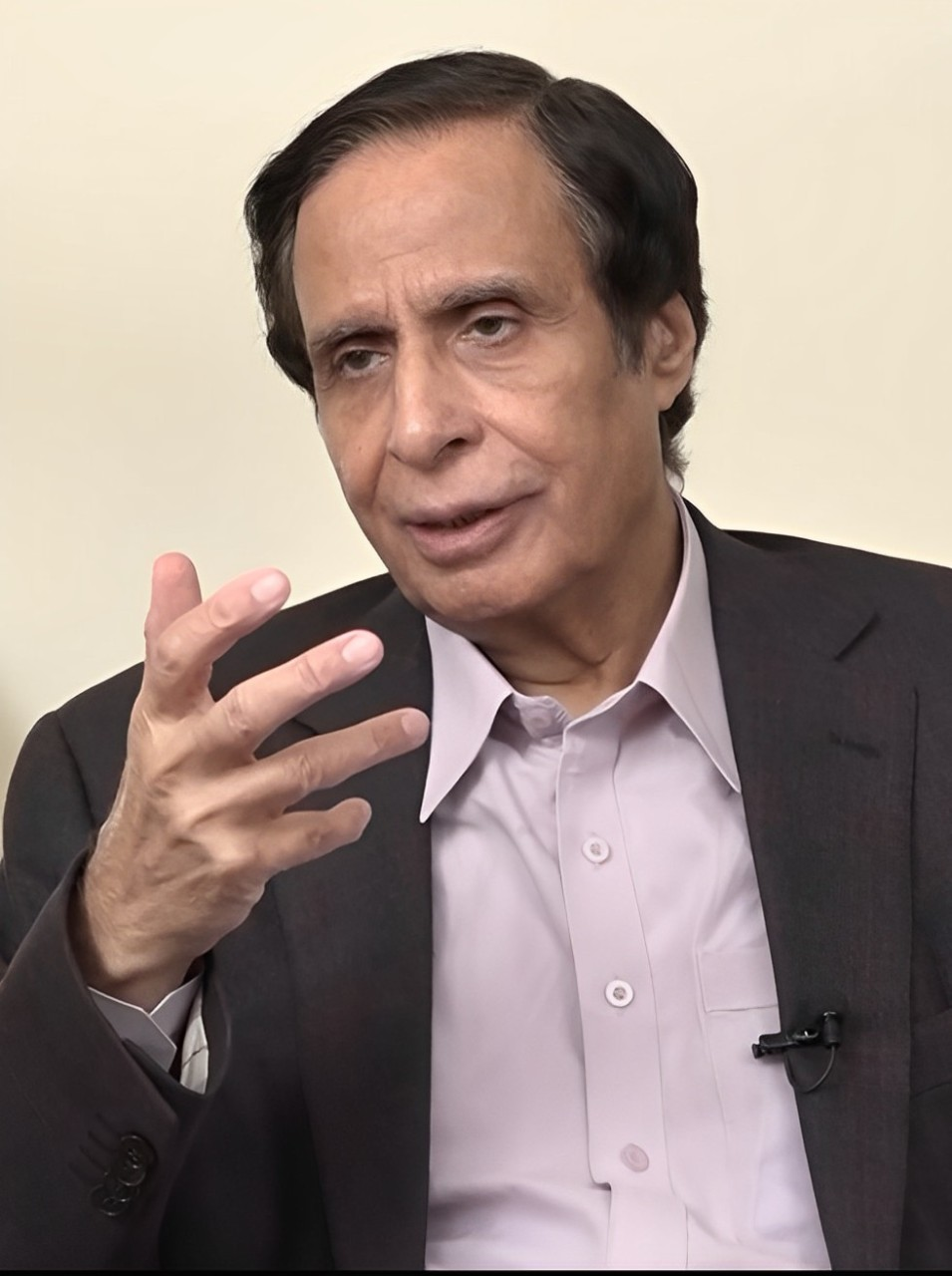

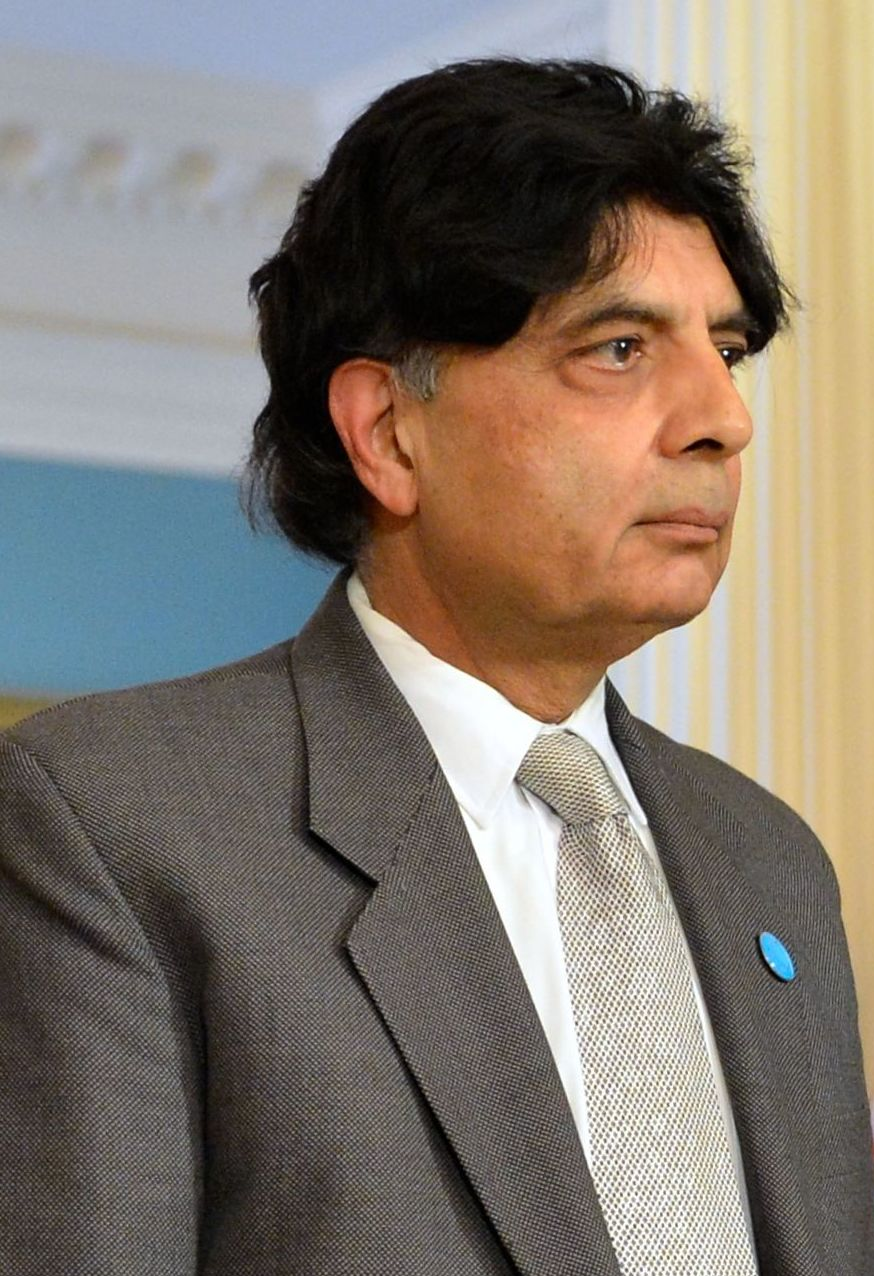
	First party	Second party	Third party
Leader	Chaudhry Pervaiz Elahi	Qasim Zia	Chaudhary Nisar Ali Khan
Party	PML(Q)	PPP	PML(N)
Leader's seat	Rahim Yar Khan-VIII	Lahore-XIX	Not contest
Seats won	210	79	47
Seat change	▲210	▲76	▼164
Popular vote	6,144,813	4,145,106	3,028,856
Percentage	33.33	22.48%	16.43%
- Map of the results of the election, by constituency
Chief Minister before election
Governor's rule
Elected Chief Minister
Chaudhry Pervaiz Elahi
PML(Q)

Provincial elections were held in the Pakistani province of Punjab to elect the 14th Provincial Assembly of the Punjab on 10 October 2002, alongside nationwide general elections and three other provincial elections in Sindh, Balochistan and North-West Frontier Province. The remaining two territories of Pakistan, AJK and Gilgit-Baltistan, were ineligible to vote due to their disputed status. The elections were held under the military government of General Pervez Musharraf. The elections saw an end to the two-party system between the Pakistan Peoples Party and the Pakistan Muslim League (N), with the centre-right Pakistan Muslim League (Q) emerging as a third main party supporting Musharraf.

There were allegations that both the provincial and general elections were engineered and rigged to bring Musharraf and his aligned party, the PML-Q in power.

== Candidates and Campaign ==
There were three main candidates in the election, Chaudhry Pervaiz Elahi, Qasim Zia, and Chaudhary Nisar Ali Khan. Qasim Zia from the Pakistan People’s Party (PPP) was lesser-known, and paired with the fact that the PPP held lesser influence in Punjab, because the PPP mainly campaigned in Sindh, made the PPP-Qasim Zia campaign weak.

Chaudry Nisar Ali Khan would not contest in a constituency, and during Musharraf’s military government, the PMLN was under severe pressure, with Nawaz Sharif, the party chairman under charges of life in prison. This weakened the PMLN campaign countrywide and in Punjab.

The two PPP and PMLN campaigns were weakened due to Musharraf’s incumbent military government, this allowed the PML-Q to campaign further. Chaudhry Pervaiz Elahi is from the Chaudhry family, and held political connections to Musharraf and was formerly part of the PML-N. Pervaiz Elahi’s campaign offered a centre-right political program primarily promoting development, as well as Pakistani nationalism, Conservatism and a halt to PML-N alleged corruption, although his campaign mainly relied on his political connections, primarily to Musharraf.

These candidates and campaigning factors allowed the PML-Q to win the elections, although the PML-Q’s opponents such as the PPP and PMLN alleged rigging. The results allowed Pervaiz Elahi to become Chief Minister of Punjab for almost 5 years, in which he brought extensive reforms during his tenure.

== Results ==

Pakistan Peoples Party: 79 seats
National Party: 15 seats
Pakistan Muslim League (Q): 209 seats
Pakistan Muslim League (Jinnah): 4 seats
Pakistan Muslim League (J): 4 seats
Pakistan Muslim League (N): 47 seats
Pakistan Muslim League (Z): 2 seats
Muttahida Majlis-e-Amal: 11 seats

Party	Votes	%	Seats			
Party	Votes	%	General	Women	Minority	Total
Pakistan Muslim League (Q)	6,144,813	33.33	168	37	5	210
Pakistan Peoples Party	4,145,106	22.48	63	14	2	79
Pakistan Muslim League (N)	3,028,856	16.43	38	8	1	47
National Alliance	577,415	3.13	12	3	0	15
Muttahida Majlis-e-Amal	1,044,217	5.66	9	2	0	11
Pakistan Muslim League (J)	219,048	1.19	3	1	0	4
NMP	216,439	1.17	0	0	0	0
Pakistan Muslim League (Jinnah)	134,748	0.73	3	1	0	4
Pakistan Muslim League (Z)	74,430	0.40	1	0	0	1
Others	417,703	2.27	0	0	0	0
Independents	2,435,199	13.21	0	0	0	0
Total	18,437,974	100.00	297	66	8	371
Source: Free and Fair Election Network (FAFEN) official website
