= 2002 Sindh provincial election =

Pakistani provincial election

- 10 October 2002

All 168 seats in the Provincial Assembly of Sindh 85 seats needed for a majority

	First party	Second party
Party	PPP	MQM-L
Seats won	67	41
Popular vote	2,115,472	898,733
Percentage	35.04%	14.88%
- Map of Sindh showing Assembly Constituencies and winning Parties
Chief Minister before election
Military rule
Pakistan Armed Forces
Elected Chief Minister
Ali Mohammad Mahar
PML(Q)

Provincial elections were held in Sindh on 10 October 2002 to elect the Provincial Assembly. The elections were held under the military government of General Pervez Musharraf.

== Result ==
Party	Votes	%	Seats
Party	Votes	%	General
Pakistan Peoples Party	2,115,472	35.04	51
Muttahida Qaumi Movement	898,733	14.88	32
National Alliance	718,424	11.90	12
Muttahida Majlis-e-Amal	620,296	10.27	8
Pakistan Muslim League (Q)	543,590	9.00	11
Pakistan Muslim League (F)	449,521	7.44	10
Muhajir Qaumi Movement – Haqiqi	58,495	0.97	1
Pakistan Tehreek-e-Insaf	278,007	4.60	0
Pakistan Muslim League (N)	355,433	5.89	–
Total	6,037,971	100.00	130
Source: Free and Fair Election Network (FAFEN)
