= Senior Minister of Punjab (Pakistan) =

Cabinet Portfolio/Office

- سینئر وزیر پنجاب

- Incumbent; Marriyum Aurangzeb since 6 March 2024
- Government of Punjab
- Style: Mr. Senior Minister (Informal); Honourable Senior Minister (Formal)
- Status: Senior Member of the Cabinet of Punjab
- Member of: Government of Punjab, Provincial Assembly of Punjab
- Reports to: Chief Minister of Punjab
- Seat: 90-A Shahrah e Quaid-e-Azam, Lahore
- Nominator: Chief Minister of Punjab
- Appointer: Governor of Punjab, Pakistan
- Term length: As long as the current assembly remains in power and/or on the wish of Chief Minister
- Formation: Constitution of Pakistan (12 April 1973)

The Senior Minister of Punjab is a title sometimes given to a senior Cabinet minister in the Government of Punjab. It implies seniority over all other Ministers in terms of Cabinet rank, but has no specific powers or authority attached to it beyond that of any other Minister. The post is de facto second in Government, although neither of these posts confers the right to succeed a Chief Minister who becomes incapacitated or resigns, making it somewhat equivalent to a Deputy Prime Minister.

The title is not always in use, so there have sometimes been extended gaps between successive holders of the title.

== See also ==
- Governor of Punjab, Pakistan
- Chief Minister of Punjab
- Leader of the Opposition of Punjab (Pakistan)
- Speaker of the Provincial Assembly of Punjab
- Provincial Assembly of the Punjab
- Government of Punjab, Pakistan
