= Usman Buzdar =

Pakistani politician (born 1969)

Sardar Usman Buzdar
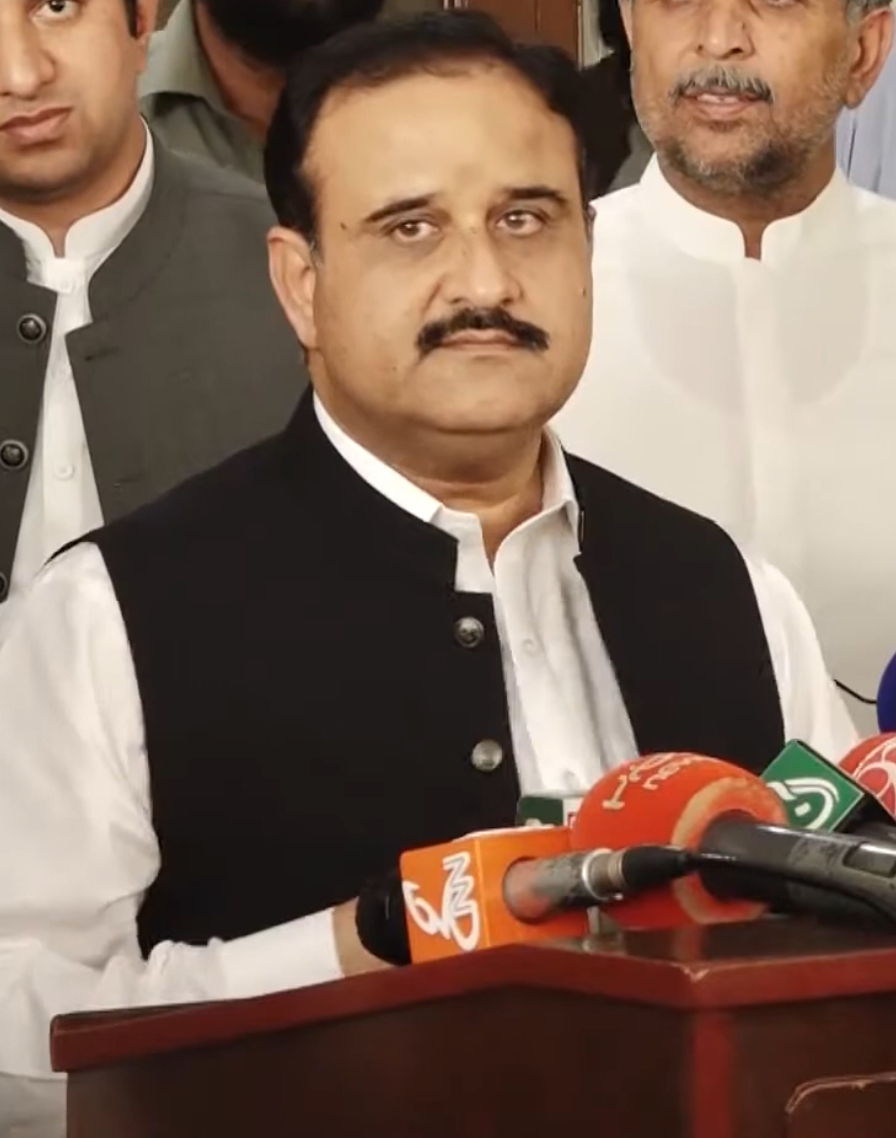
- Buzdar in 2019

16th Chief Minister of Punjab
- In office 20 August 2018 – 30 April 2022
- Governor: Chaudhry Mohammad Sarwar
- Deputy: Aleem Khan as Senior Minister
- Preceded by: Hasan Askari Rizvi (caretaker)
- Succeeded by: Chaudhry Pervaiz Elahi

Member of the Provincial Assembly of the Punjab
- In office 15 August 2018 – 14 January 2023
- Constituency: PP-286 (Dera Ghazi Khan-II)

Tehsil Nazim of Tribal Area, Dera Ghazi Khan
- In office 2001–2009

Personal details
- Born: 1 May 1969 (age 57) Dera Ghazi Khan, Punjab, Pakistan
- Party: PTI (2018-2023)
- Other political affiliations: PMLN (2013-2017); PML(Q) (2001-2011)

Sardar Usman Ahmad Khan Buzdar (Note: Urdu: سردار عثمان احمد خان بزدار) (born 1 May 1969) is a Pakistani politician who served as the 16th chief minister of Punjab from 2018 to 2022. He was a member of the Punjab Assembly from 2018 to 2023, representing the Pakistan Tehreek-e-Insaf (PTI).

Belonging to a Baloch family, he is a minor feudal and the tumandar of the Baloch tribe Buzdar, since 2019. He served as Tehsil Nazim of Tehsil Tribal Area from 2001 to 2008.

== Early life and education ==
Buzdar was born on 1 May 1969 in Dera Ghazi Khan to Sardar Fateh Muhammad Buzdar. He belongs to the Buzdar clan, which is a Baloch tribe settled in southern Punjab. Buzdar received his early education from Government Boys Primary School in Barthi, Punjab. He completed his Intermediate-level education from a government college in Multan and received a bachelor's degree in law from the Law College, Multan. It was there that he practiced law at consumer courts for three years. He received a master's degree in political science from Bahauddin Zakariya University.

== Political career ==
He is known to have changed many political parties. In 2001, Buzdar joined Pakistan Muslim League (Q) (PML-Q). In August 2001, he was elected Tehsil Nazim of Koh e Sulieman, a tribal area where he served until 2008.

He quit the PML-Q after 2008 general election and joined a forward bloc. According to another report, he remained politically affiliated with PML-Q until 2011.

He joined the Pakistan Muslim League (Nawaz) (PML-N) prior to the 2013 general election and ran for the seat of the Provincial Assembly of the Punjab as a candidate of PML-N from Constituency PP-241 (Dera Ghazi Khan-II), but was defeated by Khawaja Muhammad Nizam-ul-Mehmood.

Prior to the 2018 general election, Buzdar along with other rogue PML-N members joined Janoobi Punjab Suba Mahaz, a bloc that advocated for the creation of South Punjab province. When Janoobi Punjab Suba Mahaz merged with the PTI in May 2018, Buzdar became a member of that party. He won the election to the Punjab Assembly constituency PP-286 Dera Ghazi Khan-II on a PTI ticket.

He was running for a seat in the Provincial Assembly from PP-286 in the 2024 Punjab provincial election, until he abruptly was removed from the party by chairman Imran Khan on 1 August 2023. He later withdrew from 2024 election and his brother ran for seat as an independent candidate.

== Chief Ministership (2018–2022) ==
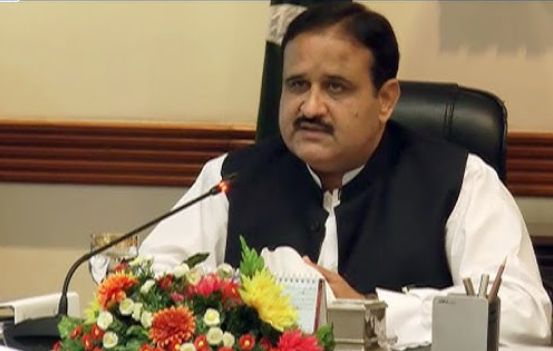
Buzdar as Chief Minister speaks at a government meeting in 2019

On 17 August 2018, Imran Khan nominated Buzdar as PTI's candidate for the office of Chief Minister of Punjab. His nomination surprised many in the PTI and received widespread criticism as he was a lesser known figure in Pakistan's political spectrum. According to Khan, he chose to support Buzdar because Buzdar hailed from an economically backward area of Punjab, so much so that he was the only member of the Punjab Assembly who "lacked electricity at his home". Other analysts claimed the selection was because Buzdar lacked an independent power base, competence, and was thus totally reliant on Khan to hold on to office.

On 19 August 2018, he was elected as the Chief Minister. He received 186 votes against his opponent Hamza Shahbaz Sharif who secured 159 votes. He was sworn in on 20 August 2018.

After assuming the office as the Chief Minister of Punjab, Buzdar held consultations with Imran Khan and formed a 23-member cabinet. The 23-member cabinet was sworn in on 27 August 2018. The second part of his cabinet, consisting of 12 provincial ministers was sworn in on 13 September 2018 increasing the size of the cabinet to 35. Chaudhry Sarwar was made Governor of Punjab on 5 September 2018.

=== Criticism ===
Under Buzdar's watch as the Chief Minister, five Inspector Generals of the Punjab Police were changed. He was largely and consistently criticized for his incompetence during his time as chief minister, and was criticized as one of the worst appointments Khan made during his tenure. It was later revealed that several PTI members including Jahangir Tareen and Asad Umar were against Buzdar's appointment as Chief Minister, and it was one of the major points of disagreement among Khan and other party members.

During his tenure, the provincial government failed to implement its promise of a Punjab Mazdoor Card and had not issued them or given minimum wage to any labourers by 9 April 2022, despite a deadline set the previous year and the registration of workers.

=== Education and Healthcare ===
In Dera Ghazi Khan the government established the district's first technical varsity, constructed a Boys Degree College, started a Bachelor of Science program in Tonsa District, and solarised schools in the tribal areas of the district. In 2019 Buzdar announced a five-year education policy titled "The New Deal" for the province, saying the government would aim to enroll 4.8 million children estimated to be out of school in Punjab into schools.

In 2020 he launched the Insaaf Medicine Card under the Punjab Sehat Sahulat Program for various diseases including AIDS, hepatitis, and tuberculosis. In January 2022 Buzdar introduced a Rs 400 billion health-card program for Lahore Division. In May 2021, Buzdar announced a Rs 13.80 billion universal health insurance program for Layyah District; introducing Rs 725,000 health insurance for families every year and five days medicine provided to patients. A mother & child hospital costing Rs. 5.73 billion was also completed. Out of 5 million families in Punjab, the Sehat Sahulat Program only benefitted 93,000 people in 2019, a success rate of 0.2 percent. The Express Tribune said that the offices of CEO and COO of the Punjab Health Insurance Initiative Management Company (PHIIMC) had been left vacant for two years and was being run on an "ad hoc basis". In addition, the program did not cover OPD and emergency services, Express Tribune saying as a result the program "has proven to have been largely useless for the masses."

=== Development budget ===
In March 2021, Buzdar unveiled "uplift" projects worth Rs. 25 billion for several districts in Punjab, he said Rs. 8.41 billion would be allocated to new projects In June 2021, Dawn reported that the provincial budget "doles out massive funds for the Pakistan Tehreek-i-Insaf legislators for execution of development projects in their constituencies under the district development package". The budget proposed Rs 560bn in development spending to fund a 3-year district package "that will be spent mostly on the schemes recommended by the PTI legislators".

==== COVID-19 Response ====
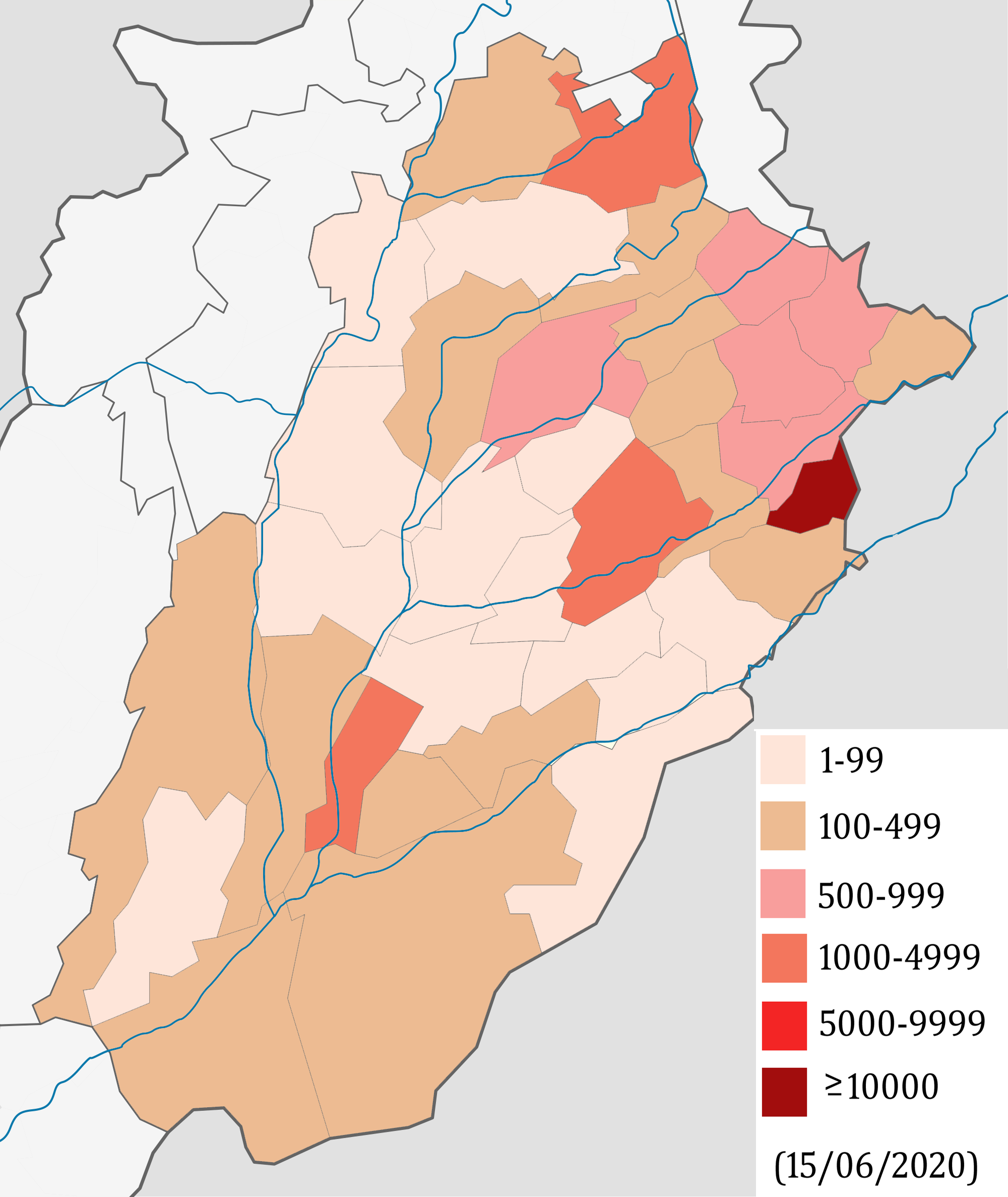
Map of COVID-19 cases in Punjab, Pakistan in June 2020.

On 22 March 2020, Buzdar's government enacted a 2-day closure of public areas and centres in response to the COVID-19 Pandemic in Pakistan. Usman Buzdar urged people to stay at home and practice social distancing.

On 28 March, Buzdar announced a Rs10 billion relief package for financial support of 2.5 million families of daily-wage earners, each family was entitled to Rs 4000 assistance excluding the beneficiaries of the Benazir Income Support Programme (BISP). Provincial taxes were lowered by Rs 18 billion while the Punjab Infectious Diseases Prevention and Control Ordinance, 2020, was introduced to allow the government to implement public health measures under the cover of law. Buzdar said that the Punjab government had decided to grant a 90-day imprisonment rebate to prisoners in jails across the province which would benefit some 3,100 prisoners. The government said it would provide a month's additional salary to all healthcare workers across Punjab.

Punjab Minister for Finance Hashim Jawan Bakht said that the economic package would help the health sector and the Provincial Disaster Management Authority (PDMA) cope with the crisis with an immediate funding of Rs. 11.5 billion. Buzdar also said laboratories around the province would test 3,200 people every day for coronavirus and 10,000 doctors and paramedics were being recruited to fight the pandemic.

=== Resignation ===
On 28 March 2022, Buzdar offered his resignation as Chief Minister of Punjab to Prime Minister Imran Khan to ease the political crises surrounding no-confidence motion against Imran Khan. On 1 April 2022, his resignation was accepted by the Governor of Punjab, but he remained in office till the appointment of the new Chief Minister. Buzdar was set to be replaced by Chaudhry Parvez Elahi, leader of PML-Q.

On 30 April 2022, he left office of Chief Minister when Hamza Shahbaz took oath as newly elected Chief Minister.

== Controversies and scandals ==
Following his nomination for the office of Chief Minister of Punjab in August 2018, reports had surfaced that a police case was registered against Buzdar and his father Sardar Fateh for their involvement in the murder of at least six people during local body elections in 1998. According to reports, an anti-terrorism court in Dera Ghazi Khan found Buzdar guilty and convicted him in January 2000. Buzdar's father later allegedly paid Rs 7.5 million as blood money to the victim's family to settle the murder case through a jirga. On 22 August 2018, Geo News claimed that it was a case of mistaken identity and that Buzdar was not the same person who was accused of the murders.

According to police reports, around 1982 about 60 acres of state land was "bogusly mutated" in favour of Fateh Muhammad Buzdar's sons, therefore Usman Buzdar and his two younger brothers. An inquiry was later launched into the case, states the FIR, which found that the land was indeed “malafidely, illegally, and through fraud, in connivance with revenue officials" given to Usman Buzdar, Umar Buzdar and Tahir Buzdar in 1982, while the deed was finalised in 1986. The transfer was also illegal, as all three brothers at the time were minors. At the time the ages of the brothers were: Usman Buzdar, 13, Umar Buzdar, 12, and Tahir Buzdar, 3. The complainant had asked for the allotment to be cancelled and the land to be returned. The court would later deem Buzdar innocent in the matter.

During his tenure as Nazim, Buzdar was accused of making 300 bogus appointments. An application was filed against him in the National Accountability Bureau (NAB) in September 2016, however NAB failed to carry out investigation. Buzdar's brother denied the accusation, claiming NAB was unable to find evidence against Buzdar, after which the case was closed.

== Personal life and net worth ==
In April 2019, after death of his father, he was made Tumandar of the Baloch tribe of Buzdar. He is married to Begum Safia Usman and has 4 daughters.

According to documents submitted to the Election Commission of Pakistan in 2018, Buzdar declared his assets worth Rs. 25 million. He declared that he owns three tractors and two cars worth Rs 2.4 million and worth Rs 3.6 million, respectively.

== Notes ==
Political offices
Preceded by Hasan Askari Rizvi; Caretaker	Chief Minister of Punjab; 30 April 2022	Succeeded by Hamza Shahbaz
