= List of people from Attock =

Below is a list of people who are known for their association with Attock. It does not necessarily mean that they were born in the city or were even nationals of the country.

== Military personnel ==
- Air Marshal Nur Khan
- Major Shaukat Hayat Khan
- Lt. General Javed Ashraf Qazi

== Politicians ==
- Sheikh Aftab Ahmed
- Malik Amin Aslam
- Rab Butler
- Muhammad Zain Elahi
- Hakmeen Khan
- Malik Aitbar Khan
- Malik Allahyar Khan
- Tahir Sadiq Khan
- Shuja Khanzada

== Businessmen ==
- Malik Amin Aslam
- Malik Ata Muhammad Khan

== Actors ==
- Hanzala Shahid

== Sports ==
- Qadeer Ahmed, cricketer
- Haider Ali, cricketer
- Qazi Ashfaq, footballer
- Hammad Azam, cricketer
- Babar Hayat, cricketer
- Jahangir Khan, footballer
- Naveed Khan, footballer
- Nizakat Khan, cricketer
- Shabana Latif, female cricketer
- Ehsan Nawaz, cricketer
