= NA-50 Attock-II =

Constituency of the National Assembly of Pakistan

- Constituency for the National Assembly of Pakistan
- Region: Fateh Jang, Jand and Pindi Gheb Tehsils and Hasan Abdal Tehsil (partly) of Attock District
- Electorate: 708,151

Current constituency
- Party: Pakistan Muslim League (N)
- Member: Malik Sohail Khan
- Created from: NA-58 Attock-II; NA-59 (Attock-III)

NA-50 Attock-II (این اے-50، اٹک-۲) is a constituency for the National Assembly of Pakistan.

== Members of Parliament ==
=== 1970–1977: NW-31 Campbellpur-II ===
Election	Member	Party
1970	Pir Syed Shafi-ud-Din	ML(C)

=== 1977: NA-42 Campbellpur-II ===
Election	Member	Party
1977	Sardar Shaukat Hayat Khan	PPP

=== 1985–2002: NA-42 Attock-II ===
Election	Member	Party
1985	Sardar Muhammad Sarfraz Khan	Independent
1988	Malik Amir Muhammad Khan	PPP
1990	Malik Allahyar Khan	IJI
1993	Malik Lal Khan	PML-N
1997	Malik Lal Khan	PML-N

=== 2002–2018: NA-58 Attock-II ===
Election	Member	Party
2002	Malik Allahyar Khan	PML-Q
2008	Chaudhry Pervaiz Elahi	PML-Q
2013	Malik Ihtebar Khan	PML-N

=== 2018–2023: NA-56 Attock-II ===
Election	Member	Party
2018	Tahir Sadiq	PTI
By-election 2018	Malik Sohail Khan	PML (N)

=== 2024–present: NA-50 Attock-II ===
Election	Member	Party
2024	Malik Sohail Khan	PML (N)

== Detailed Results ==
=== Election 2002 ===
General elections were held on 10 October 2002. Malik Allah Yar Khan of PML-Q won by 88,784 votes.

General election 2002: NA-58 Attock-II
Party	Candidate	Votes	%	±%
PML(Q)	Malik Allahyar Khan	88,784	58.50	
PML(N)	Malik Sohail Khan	41,373	27.26	
PPP	Syed Iftikhar Ali Khan	10,302	6.79	
MMA	Syed Abdul Salam Hassan Raza Naqvi	8,126	5.35	
Others	Others (two candidates)	3,192	2.10	
Turnout		157,007	57.17	
Total valid votes		151,777	96.67	
Rejected ballots		5,230	3.33	
Majority		47,411	31.24	
Registered electors		274,639		

=== Election 2008 ===
Chaudhry Pervaiz Elahi succeeded in the election 2008 and became the member of National Assembly.

General election 2008: NA-58 Attock-II
Party	Candidate	Votes	%	±%
PML(Q)	Parvez Elahi	70,743	39.01	
PML(N)	Malik Sohail Khan	59,726	32.94	
PPP	Sardar Shahnawaz Khan	50,354	27.77	
Others	Others (two candidates)	507	0.28	
Turnout		187,136	59.30	
Total valid votes		181,330	96.90	
Rejected ballots		5,806	3.10	
Majority		11,017	6.07	
Registered electors		315,556		
PML(Q) hold				

=== Election 2013 ===
General elections were held on 11 May 2013. Malik Atibar Khan of PML-N won by 85,244 votes and became the member of National Assembly.

General election 2013: NA-58 Attock-II
Party	Candidate	Votes	%	±%
PML(N)	Malik Aitbar Khan	85,244	38.60	
PTI	Malik Sohail Khan	74,526	33.75	
Independent	Tahir Sadiq	59,067	26.75	
Others	Others (two candidates)	1,974	0.90	
Turnout		227,948	63.49	
Total valid votes		220,811	96.87	
Rejected ballots		7,137	3.13	
Majority		10,718	4.85	
Registered electors		359,058		
PML(N) gain from PML(Q)				

=== Election 2018 ===
General elections were held on 25 July 2018. The constituency got second highest number of total votes polled in all of Pakistan.

General election 2018: NA-56 Attock-II
Party	Candidate	Votes	%	±%
PTI	Tahir Sadiq	163,325	41.92	
PML(N)	Malik Sohail Khan	99,404	25.51	
TLP	Syed Faisal Mehmood Shah	62,257	15.98	
PPP	Sardar Saleem Haider Khan	38,779	9.95	
Independent	Shehryar Khan	21,656	5.56	
Others	Others (two candidates)	4,174	1.08	
Turnout		399,738	62.56	
Total valid votes		389,595	97.46	
Rejected ballots		10,143	2.54	
Majority		63,921	16.41	
Registered electors		638,937		
PTI gain from PML(N)				

=== By-election 2018 ===
By-elections were held in this constituency on 14 October 2018.

By-election 2018: NA-56 Attock-II
Party	Candidate	Votes	%	±%
PML(N)	Malik Sohail Khan	128,499	52.25	▲26.74
PTI	Malik Khurram Ali Khan	86,906	35.34	▼6.58
TLP	Syed Faisal Mehmood Shah	30,506	12.41	▼3.57
Turnout		250,280	39.09	▼23.47
Total valid votes		245,911	98.25	▲0.79
Rejected ballots		4,369	1.75	▼0.79
Majority		41,593	16.91	▲33.32
Registered electors		640,133		
PML(N) gain from PTI		Swing	▲16.66	

=== Election 2024 ===
General elections were held on 8 February 2024. Malik Sohail Khan won the election with 118,288 votes.

General election 2024: NA-50 Attock-II
Party	Candidate	Votes	%	±%
PML(N)	Malik Sohail Khan	118,288	28.47	▼23.78
PTI	Eman Waseem (Note: Filed nomination papers as PTI candidate but ECP allowed him to run as an Independent)	109,908	26.46	▼8.88
TLP	Saad Hussain Rizvi	91,469	22.02	▲9.61
PPP	Sardar Saleem Haider Khan	63,689	15.33	N/A
Others	Others (sixteen candidates)	32,069	7.72	
Turnout		425,267	60.05	▲20.96
Total valid votes		415,423	97.69	
Rejected ballots		9,844	2.31	
Majority		8,380	2.02	▼14.89
Registered electors		708,151		
PML(N) hold				

== See also ==
- NA-49 Attock-I
- NA-51 Murree-cum-Rawalpindi
