= Eman Waseem =

Pakistani politician

Member of the National Assembly of Pakistan
- In office 18 November 2002 – 2004
- Preceded by: Malik Nur Khan
- Succeeded by: Shaukat Aziz
- Constituency: NA-59 (Attock-III)

Personal details
- Born: Eman Tahir
- Party: PTI (2017-present)
- Other political affiliations: PML(Q) (2002-2017)
- Parent: Tahir Sadiq Khan (father)
- Relatives: Muhammad Zain Elahi (brother); Chaudhry Shujaat Hussain (uncle)

Eman Waseem (née Tahir) (born 17 June 1977) is a Pakistani politician who was a member of the National Assembly of Pakistan from 2002 to 2004.

Waseem was elected to the National Assembly of Pakistan from Constituency NA-59 (Attock-III) as a candidate of Pakistan Muslim League (Q) in the 2002 Pakistani general election. She received 65,672 votes and defeated PPP-P's Sikandar Hayat Khan. She resigned from the seat in 2004 for former Prime Minister of Pakistan, Shaukat Aziz, who was later elected as MNA from the same constituency in 2004 by-elections.

In 2008, Waseem ran for the seat in National Assembly of Pakistan as an independent candidate from Constituency NA-57 (Attock-I) in the general election but was unsuccessful. She received 33,975 votes and lost the seat to Pakistan Muslim League (N)'s Sheikh Aftab Ahmed.
