= Malik Jamshed Altaf =

Pakistani politician

Member of the Provincial Assembly of the Punjab
- In office 15 August 2018 – 14 January 2023
- Constituency: PP-5 Attock-V

Personal details
- Party: PTI (2018-present)

Malik Jamshed Altaf, son of Malik Muhammad Altaf a prominent landlord, was born on October 13, 1962, at Nurpur, Attock. He is a Pakistani politician who had been a member of the Provincial Assembly of Punjab from August 2018 till January 2023 and previously served as Vice Nazim District council Attock and thrice as chairman Uc Khunda and Uc Gulial. He contested his first election In 1986. He did his Matriculation in 2004 from Rawalpindi.

== Political career ==
He served as Chairman Union Council Khunda, Jand, Attock during 1986-87, as Chairman Union Council Gulial and Khunda. He also served as Vice Chairman District Council Attock.

He was elected to the Provincial Assembly of the Punjab as a candidate of the Pakistan Tehreek-e-Insaf (PTI) from PP-5 Attock-V in the 2018 Punjab provincial election. He received 57,333 votes and defeated Malik Bahdur Yar, a candidate of Pakistan Muslim League Nawaz (PML-N).

He ran for a seat in the Provincial Assembly from PP-5 Attock-V as a candidate of the PTI in the 2023 Punjab provincial election.
