= Malik Amin Aslam =

Pakistani environmentalist and politician

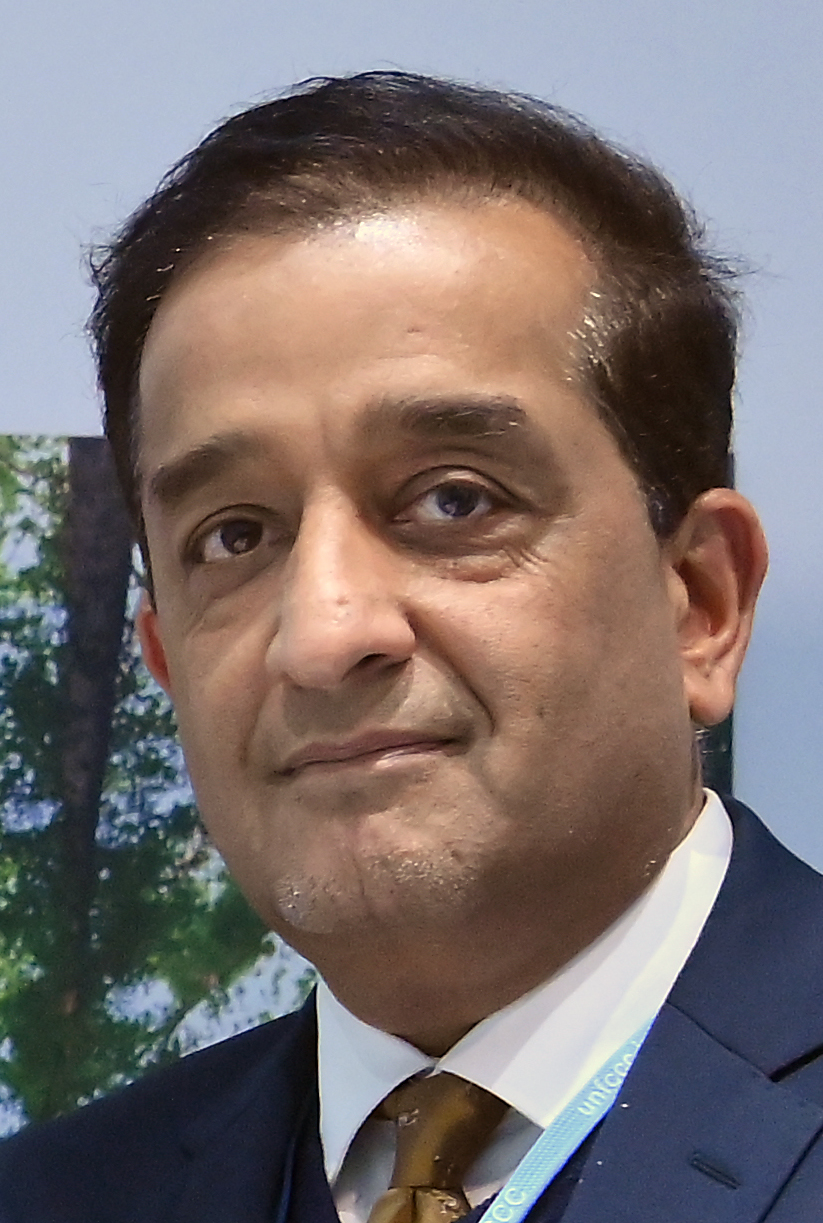

Advisor to the Prime Minister for Climate Change
- In office 20 August 2018 – 10 April 2022
- President: Arif Alvi
- Prime Minister: Imran Khan
- Deputy: Zartaj Gul

Minister of State for Environment
- In office 2002–2007
- President: Pervez Musharraf
- Prime Minister: Shaukat Aziz

Personal details
- Born: November 27, 1966 (age 59) Karachi, Sindh, Pakistan
- Party: TLP (2025-present)
- Other political affiliations: PTI (2011-2023); IND (2008); PML(Q) (2002-2008)
- Education: Aitchison College; University of Engineering and Technology, Lahore; McGill University; University of Oxford
- Profession: Politician
- Awards: Tamgha-e-Imtiaz (2019)

Malik Amin Aslam (born November 27, 1966) is a Pakistani environmentalist and politician who served as Federal Minister and Adviser to former Prime Minister of Pakistan Imran Khan for Climate Change. He also serves as Vice President in IUCN.

A notable personality in Attock District, he has previously chaired the flagship Green Growth Initiative for the KPK province in Pakistan from 2013 till 2018, which included the mass a forestation “Billion Tree Tsunami” project.

== Early life and education ==
Malik Amin Aslam was born into a Punjabi Muslim family of the Awan clan in Karachi on November 27, 1966.

His family has been in politics for three generations, as his father served as member of National Assembly from Attock thrice and was the Punjab revenue minister.

He got his early education from the Aitchison College. He later moved to Lahore in 1990 to study for the degree of BSc in Electrical Engineering from UET Lahore. For higher education, he went abroad to get MBA in Finance from McGill University in 1993 and a MSc in Environmental Management from University of Oxford in 1996.

According to the official profile on Minister of Climate Change Government of Pakistan, he completed his thesis on the utility of the “emissions trading” concept within the context of managing the Climate Change issue.

He is also a member of the International Editorial Board of Climate Policy Journal since 1998.

He is married with and is a father two sons and a daughter.

His hobbies include scuba diving and sky diving.

== Professional life ==
After his studies, Malik Amin Aslam worked as the private consultant with the World Bank and United Nations on environmental issues. His area of expertise is climate change and has written a number of articles and co-authored two books that have been published by the World Resource Institute in Washington, D.C. He was also on the National Environmental Advisory Board and the Environmental Protection Council before entering politics. He considers himself a technocrat-turned-politician. An agriculturist/environment consultant by profession, he has also served as a member of the UN Working Group on Climate Change since 1997.

On Sep 13,2011, he was elected to serve on the governing council of International Union for Conservation of Nature for a four-year term in 2012. He was re-elected as Regional Councillor for Asia (2016-2020) at the World Conservation Congress held in Hawaii (September 2016). He also chaired the flagship "Green Growth initiative" for the province of KPK in Pakistan – which included the mass afforestation "Billion Tree Tsunami" project. He was also chosen to serve on the high level "International Advisory Council" for the Eco-Forum Global. In August 2018, Prime Minister Imran Khan nominated Malik as Advisor on Climate Change.

On March 23, 2019, Malik was honored with the Tamgha-e-Imtiaz by the President of Pakistan Arif Alvi for his efforts in implementing the Billion Tree Tsunami and his work for the environment.

== Political career ==
He began his political career at the time when Islamic Republic of Pakistan under the control of military dictator Pervez Musharraf. He first successfully ran in local elections from Attock, Punjab, Pakistan, in 2001.

=== General Elections - 2002 ===
A year later, under the military regime he became an elected Member of National Assembly after the controversial election of 2002 and served as Minister of State for Environment. He ran on the ticket of Pakistan Muslim League (Q) from NA-57 (Attock-I). His tenure ended in 2007.

=== General Elections - 2008 ===
In the general elections of 2008, he contested independently and lost with the margin of almost 200 votes] .

=== General Elections - 2013 ===
He re-joined Pakistan Tehreek-e-Insaaf on November 19, 2011. He ran for same seat in general elections of 2013 but lost to Sheikh Aftab Ahmed from Pakistan Muslim League (N).

=== General Elections - 2018 ===
Attock was considered an important seat in 2018 elections. During this time Imran Khan embraced Major(r) Tahir Sadiq Khan, a powerful political personality, joined Pakistan Tehreek-e-Insaaf. This opened up a lot of speculations among the locals about who would get the party ticket. In the end Imran Khan decided to give the ticket to Major(r) Tahir Sadiq. The supporters of Malik Amin Aslam were in shock over the denial of NA ticket to him from Attock. Few days after the announcement of the party ticket, at a function, Imran Khan showered praise on Malik Amin Aslam for making the Billion Tree Tsunami project a great success and promised to make him federal minister for environment after the elections. Malik Amin Aslam Khan mostly remains frustrated due to his defeat from Major Tahir Sadiq He left PTI on 18 May 2023 due to difference on violent protests by his party supporters on military installations due to arrest of Ex PM Imran Khan in Abdul qadir trust case by NAB.

=== Nomination for Reserved Seat ===
Prime Minister Imran Khan fulfilled his promise in August 2018, when he nominated Malik Amin Aslam for the Reserved Seat of Adviser for Climate Change to the Prime Minister of Pakistan. This decision was very well received by the local environmentalists.

On May 18, 2023, Malik Amin Aslam made the decision to leave the Pakistan Tehreek-e-Insaf (PTI) party. His departure was prompted by the violent protests that took place on May 9.

== Publications ==
- Climate Change: Global Solutions and Opportunities for Pakistan, 2000.
- The Kyoto Mechanisms & Global Climate Change: Coordination Issues and Domestic Policies, 2000. Co-authored with Erik F. Haites.
- Greenhouse gas market perspectives : trade and investment implications of the climate change regime; recent research on institutional and economic aspects of carbon trading, 2001.
- Carbon Market Development in Pakistan, 2008.
