= Dhok Darbal =

Dhok Darbal is a village of Talagang District, in the Punjab province of Pakistan. It lies 40 km south-west of the town of Talagang, 70 km from the M-2 motorway's Bulkasar Interchange, and 8 km from Tamman.

== Nearest dhokes ==
Following are the dhokes near the Dhok Darbal:

- Dhoke Mushab
- Dhoke Fateh Shah
- Dhoke Qutab
- Dhoke Jat
- Dhoke Bhadhoor
- Dhoke Sahbal
- Dhermond
- Dhoke Balawali
- Dhoke Mukarbi
- Dhoke Ardal

== Nearest schools ==
- Government High School Dhok Mushab (Boys)
- Government High School Dhok Mushab (Girls)
- Government Secondary School Dhok Fateh Shah (Girls)
- Government secondary school Dhok Fateh Shah
- Iqbal islami School Dhok Fateh Shah (Private)
- Government high school Dhermond (Boys and Girls)

== Languages ==
Punjabi is the native language of the majority of Dhok Darbal.

== Economy ==
Most people of Dhok Darbal prefer to join armed forces like Pakistan Army, Pakistan Navy and Pakistan Air Force. Dhok Darbal has the highest proportion of its population serving in the armed forces of Pakistan.

Many people here work in agriculture.

== Food ==
The food which the people of Dhok Darbal consume is very modernized, including biryani and halwa.
