= Muhammad Arshad Chaudhry =

Pakistani politician

Member of the Provincial Assembly of the Punjab
- In office 15 August 2018 – 14 January 2023
- Constituency: PP-34 Gujrat-VII

Personal details
- Party: PTI (2018-present)
- Other political affiliations: PML(Q) (2002-2008)

Muhammad Arshad Chaudhry is a Pakistani politician who had been a member of the Provincial Assembly of the Punjab from August 2018 till January 2023.

== Early life and education ==
He was born on 1 November 1959 in Sarai Alamgir, Pakistan.

He has a degree of Bachelor of Arts and Bachelor of Laws.

=== Family ===
He is from the Chaach family of Sarai Alamgir. His brother Chaudhry Muhammed Farooq (Urdu: چودھری محمد فاروق; November 1959 – 29 December 2002) was a member of the Punjab Assembly from 1988 to 1997, and again in 2002. He was Minister for Law and Parliamentary Affairs during 1993–97, and the provincial president of PML. His uncle Chaudhry Abdul Rahman remained Tehseel Nazim Sarai Alamgir two times.

== Political career ==
He was elected to the Provincial Assembly of the Punjab as a candidate of the Pakistan Muslim League (Q) in a 2002 by-election that was called due to his brothers murder. He remained a member of the Provincial Assembly of the Punjab from 2002 to 2013.

He was re-elected to the Provincial Assembly as a candidate of the Pakistan Tehreek-e-Insaf (PTI) from PP-34 (Gujrat-VII) in the 2018 Punjab provincial election.

He ran for a seat in the Provincial Assembly from PP-28 Gujrat-I as a candidate of the PTI in the 2023 Punjab provincial election.
