= Chaudhry Muhammed Farooq =

Pakistani politician (1959–2002)

Muhammed Farooq Chaudhary محمد فاروق چوہدری

Minister For Law & Parliamentary Affairs Punjab
- In office 1993–1997
- Succeeded by: Mohammad Basharat Raja
- Constituency: PP-95 (Gujrat-1)

Personal details
- Born: 1 November 1959 Sarai Alamgir
- Died: 29 December 2002 (aged 43)
- Citizenship: Pakistani
- Party: Pakistan Muslim League (Junejo)

Chaudhry Muhammed Farooq (Urdu: چودھری محمد فاروق. November 1959 – 29 December 2002) was a member of the Pakistani Punjab Assembly from 1988 to 1997, and again in 2002. He was Minister for Law and Parliamentary Affairs during 1993–1997, and the provincial president of the PML.

== Family ==
He was from Chaach family of Sarai Alamgeer. His brother, Muhammad Arshad Chaudhry is part of Pakistan Tehreek E Insaf (PTI) and remained a member of the Provincial Assembly of the Punjab three times (2002-2007), (2008-2013) (2018-2022).

His uncle Chaudhry Abdul Rahman remained Tehseel Nazim Sarai Alamgir two times and his father in law Sheikh Aftab Ahmed was Federal Minister in Nawaz Sharif Cabinet.

== Death ==
After Winning the 2002 general elections from his Constituency as an independent candidate with the highest number of votes ever. Farooq's name was being taken for the most important ministry of Punjab. His rivals unable to digest their defeat, set up an ambush and martyred him by use of hired assassins. Two armed security guards did not have time to respond; they were killed, as were Farooq and his 3 friends. The investigation focused on a possible tribal feud and in fact it was a tribal feud between Rajput and Jutt tribes.
