= Begum Mussarat Mahmood Shaukat Hyat Khan =

Pakistani humanitarian (1924–2012)

- Born: Begum Mussarrat Mahmood; 1 May 1924; Amritsar, Punjab, British Raj, British India
- Died: 30 June 2012 (aged 88); Lahore, Punjab, Pakistan
- Resting place: Lahore
- Other names: Begum Shaukat Hyat Khan
- Citizenship: British Indian (1924-1947); Pakistani (1947-2012)
- Occupations: Humanitarian; Socialite; Civil servant
- Years active: 1940 – 2012
- Spouse: Shaukat Hayat Khan (husband)
- Children: 6
- Relatives: Sikandar Hayat Khan (father-in-law)

Begum Mussarat Mahmood Shaukat Hyat Khan (May 1, 1924 – June 30, 2012) was a Pakistani humanitarian, society figure, and a prominent witness to the political evolution of the Indian subcontinent. As the wife of Sardar Shaukat Hayat Khan—a key lieutenant to Muhammad Ali Jinnah—she played a vital role in supporting the Pakistan Movement and later dedicated decades to providing medical and social aid to impoverished communities in the North-West Frontier Province.

== Early life and family ==
She was born in 1924 in Amritsar, Punjab, Mussarat belonged to a distinguished upper-middle-class family with a legacy of high administrative service under Mughal, Sikh, and British administrations. Her father, Mir Maqbool Mahmood, was a prominent lawyer who famously attempted to restrain British authorities before the 1919 Jallianwala Bagh massacre and later contributed to the 1940 Pakistan Resolution.

She received a convent education and was fluent in English, which was the primary language used in her childhood home. Known for her fair complexion, blue-green eyes, and elegant stature, she was widely considered one of the great beauties of her era, often compared by contemporaries to the Maharani of Jaipur, Gayatri Devi.

== Career ==
=== Marriage and political role ===
In her teens, she was betrothed to her cousin, Sardar Shaukat Hayat Khan, the eldest son of the influential Punjabi Premier Sir Sikandar Hayat Khan. Following their marriage, the couple's ancestral seat in Wah became a central hub for political negotiations. Mussarat served as hostess to pivotal leaders, including Muhammad Ali Jinnah and Jawaharlal Nehru.

During the 1947 Partition, she was actively involved in assisting refugees and victims of communal violence.

=== Humanitarian work in Naran ===
Beginning in the late 20th century, the Hyat-Khans established a family home on a pine-covered hill in Naran, located at an altitude of 2,400 meters. Appalled by the lack of local infrastructure, Begum Mussarat transformed the residence into an informal community center for the next two decades. She assembled a personal stock of medical supplies and personally dispensed medicines to local hill tribes. She organized dowries for impoverished women and provided food to local families. Moved by the plight of local orphans, she adopted two sisters from the Naran area and brought them to Lahore to be raised as part of her family.

Despite her age, she provided extensive support to families affected by the 2005 Kashmir earthquake, which devastated the Naran region.

== Personal life ==
Begum Mussarat's later years were marked by a quiet, private life following the death of her husband in 1998. For years after her husband's passing, she maintained a weekly tradition of visiting his grave at Wah every Thursday to pray. She was the mother of six children—two sons and four daughters—including the politician Sardar Sikandar Hayat Khan.

== Death ==
She died on 30 June 2012 at the age of 88 in Lahore, Pakistan.

== Legacy ==
She is remembered for her "graceful and elegant" presence and her selfless, non-formalized charity work that supported generations of people in the Kaghan Valley.
