= Malik Sohail Khan =

Pakistani politician

- ملک سہیل خان

Member of the National Assembly of Pakistan
- Incumbent
- Assumed office 29 February 2024
- Constituency: NA-50 Attock-II
- In office 29 October 2018 – 10 August 2023
- Constituency: NA-56 (Attock-II)

Personal details
- Party: PMLN (2018-present)

Malik Sohail Khan Kamrial is a Pakistani politician who has been a member of the National Assembly of Pakistan since February 2024 and previously served in this position from October 2018 till August 2023.

== Political career ==
Khan was elected to the National Assembly of Pakistan as a candidate of Pakistan Muslim League (N) (PML-N) from Constituency NA-56 (Attock-II) in the 2018 Pakistani by-elections held on 14 October 2018.

== Bogus cheque case ==
A case had been filed against the PML-N lawmaker at Model Town police station on 29 January for giving a bogus cheque. Khan fled from the local court in Gujranwala after the cancellation of bail in Rs. 60 million bogus cheque case on 24 February 2022.
