= Sardar Saleem Haider Khan =

Pakistani politician

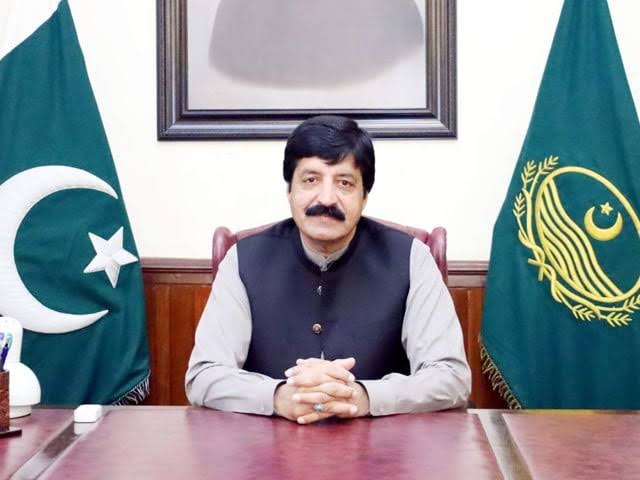
- Official portrait, 2024

Ex 42nd Governor of Punjab
- Incumbent
- Assumed office 10 May 2024
- President: Asif Ali Zardari
- Prime Minister: Main Mohammad Shehbaz Sharif
- Chief Minister: Maryam Nawaz
- Preceded by: Baligh Ur Rehman

Special Assistant to the Prime Minister on Overseas Pakistanis and HR Development
- In office 6 October 2022 – 10 August 2023
- President: Arif Alvi
- Prime Minister: Shehbaz Sharif

Minister of State for Defence
- In office June 2010 – March 2013
- President: Asif Ali Zardari
- Prime Minister: Raja Pervaiz Ashraf

Minister of State for Defence Production
- In office November 2008 – February 2010
- President: Asif Ali Zardari
- Prime Minister: Yusuf Raza Gilani

Member of the National Assembly
- In office 2006–2015
- Succeeded by: Muhammad Zain Elahi
- Constituency: NA-59 (Attock-III)

Personal details
- Party: PPP (2002-present)

Sardar Saleem Haider Khan is a Pakistani politician who is currently serving as the 42nd Governor of Punjab, in office since 10 May 2024.

Previously, he held the position of Special Assistant to the Prime Minister on Overseas Pakistanis and Human Resource Development in federal cabinet under Prime Minister Shehbaz Sharif, Minister of State for Defence Production from 2008 to 2011, and Minister of State for Defence from 2012 to 2013. Additionally, he had been a member of the National Assembly of Pakistan from 2008 to 2013 and is a member of the PPP.

== Early life and education ==
Sardar Saleem Haider Khan was born on 1 June 1969 in Dhurnal, a small town in Fateh Jang Tehsil of Attock District, approximately 75 kilometres southwest of Islamabad. He is the son of Sardar Jang Bahadar Khan, a local landlord. He completed his early schooling in Talagang up to the middle standard before pursuing higher education in Rawalpindi. He earned a Bachelor of Science degree in mathematics and statistics from Satellite Town Degree College, Rawalpindi.

During his youth, he actively participated in sports, including cricket, football, and hockey. From an early age, he developed an interest in politics and viewed it as a prospective career path. While a student, he was actively involved in student politics and was elected secretary general of the Muslim Students Federation (MSF) twice and president three times during his college years. Influenced by the political ideology and leadership of Zulfikar Ali Bhutto, he later became affiliated with the PPP.

== Political career ==
He ran for the seat of the Provincial Assembly of the Punjab as a candidate of Pakistan People's Party (PPP) from Constituency PP-18 (Attock-IV) in the 2002 Pakistani general election but was unsuccessful. He received 37,140 votes and lost the seat to Malik Muhammad Anwar, a candidate of Pakistan Muslim League (Q) (PML-Q).

He was elected to the National Assembly of Pakistan from Constituency NA-59 (Attock-III) as a candidate of PPP in the 2008 Pakistani general election. He received 71,400 votes and defeated Waseem Gulzar, a candidate of PML-Q. In November 2008, he was inducted into the federal cabinet of Prime Minister Yousaf Raza Gillani and was appointed as Minister of State for Defence Production where he served until February 2011. In June 2012, he was inducted into the federal cabinet of Prime Minister Raja Pervaiz Ashraf and was appointed Minister of State for Defence where he served until March 2013.

He ran for the seat of National Assembly from Constituency NA-59 (Attock-III) as a candidate of PPP in the 2013 Pakistani general election but was unsuccessful. He received 31,831 votes and lost the seat to Muhammad Zain Elahi.

On 14 September 2022, Prime Minister Shehbaz Sharif appointed him as a Special Assistant in his federal cabinet. On 6 October, he assumed responsibility for leading the Overseas Pakistanis and Human Resource Development Division. He was granted the status of Minister of State on 9 December and served as Special Assistant to the Prime Minister on Overseas Pakistanis and Human Resource Development until 10 August 2023.

After the 2024 Pakistani general election, PPP and Pakistan Muslim League (N) (PML-N) struck a power-sharing deal to establish a coalition government as none of the parties secured a simple majority. According to the PPP-PML-N agreement, PPP was assured various constitutional and executive positions, such as the presidency, Senate chairmanship, governorships of Khyber Pakhtunkhwa and Punjab, chief ministership of Balochistan, and deputy speakership of the National Assembly.

On 4 May 2024, President Asif Ali Zardari approved the appointment of Khan as the Governor of Punjab. On 10 May, he took the oath of office as Governor of Punjab.

== Chancellor of University ==
He, being governor of the Punjab, is the Chancellor of all public sector Universities as well as private Universities. In public sector Universities, he has authority to appoint Vice Chancellor and oversee the progress of the Universities.
