= No. 1 (Indian) Service Flying Training School RAF =

No. 1 (Indian) Service Flying Training School
- Ensign of the Royal Air Force
- Active: 1940-1946
- Country: India
- Allegiance: United Kingdom
- Branch: Royal Air Force
- Role: Training
- Garrison/HQ: RAF Ambala

No. 1 (Indian) Service Flying Training School (No. 1 (I) SFTS) was a training school that was established to train Indian pilots during the Second World War. It became part of the Indian Air Force after the war.

== Unit history ==
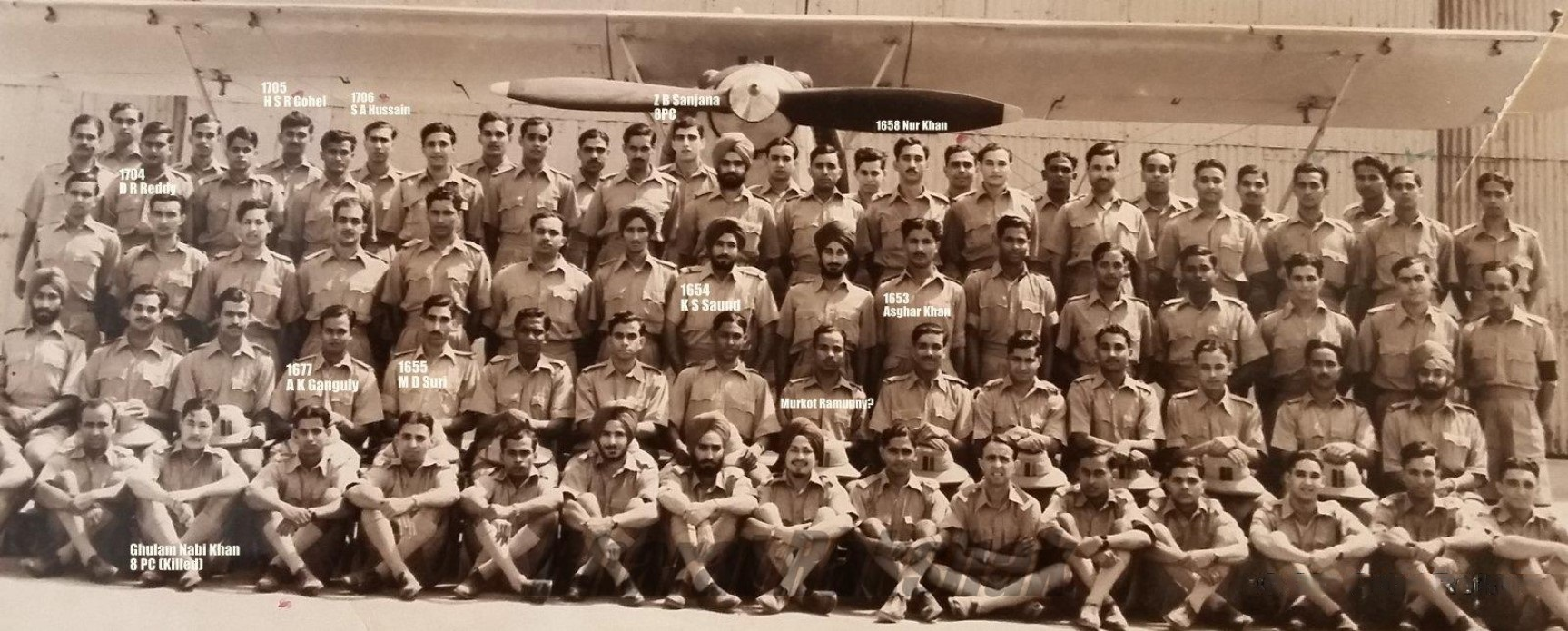
77 Pilot Officer Cadets from three training courses, including Asghar Khan and Nur Khan (1941)

The unit was previously No. 1 (Indian) Flying Training School which had formed at RAF Ambala on 1 November 1940 however on 21 July 1941 it was then renamed to No. 1 (Indian) Service Flying Training School.

== Aircraft operated ==
- Hawker Hart
- Hawker Audax
- North American Harvard IIB
- Hawker Hurricane IIB
- Hurricane IIC
- Hurricane IID
- Hurricane IV
- Supermarine Spitfire Vc
- Spitfire VIII
- Spitfire XIV
- Airspeed Oxford
- Avro Anson

== Disbandment ==
The unit disbanded on 1 April 1946 at RAF Ambala.
