= Nur Khan =

3rd Pakistani Air Chief (1923–2011)

Air Marshal Malik Nur Khan HJ HQA SQA SPk
- نور خان
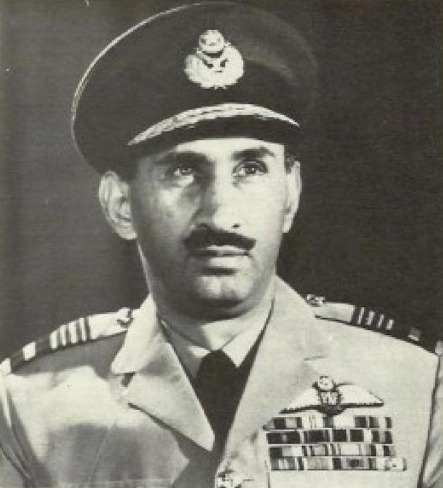
- Portrait, c. 1966

Member of the 7th National Assembly of Pakistan
- In office 20 March 1985 – 29 May 1988
- Constituency: NA-43 (Attock-III)

6th Governor of West Pakistan
- In office 1 September 1969 – 31 January 1970
- Preceded by: Tikka Khan
- Succeeded by: Attiqur Rahman

3rd Commander-in-Chief Pakistan Air Force
- In office 23 July 1965 – 31 August 1969
- Deputy: See list: Mohammad Akhtar (1966); S.A. Yusaf (1966-67); Abdul Qadir (1967-69); Khyber Khan (1969)
- Preceded by: Asghar Khan
- Succeeded by: Abdur Rahim Khan
Other offices
Chairman Board of Control for Cricket in Pakistan
In office 10 February 1980 – 2 February 1984
Appointed by	General Zia-ul-Haq
Preceded by	Khwaja Mohammad Azhar Khan
Succeeded by	Safdar Butt
7th, 10th President of the Pakistan Hockey Federation
In office 1976 – 2 February 1984
Preceded by	Sadiq Hussain Qureshi
In office 1967–1969
Chief Administrator Civil Aviation Authority and Tourism (Pakistan)
In office February 1964 – 22 July 1965
President Peshawar Club Limited
In office March 1968 – March 1969
In office April 1959 – June 1961
Managing Director Pakistan International Airlines
In office 6 March 1959 – 22 July 1965
Preceded by	Zafar-ul-Ahsan
Succeeded by	Asghar Khan
Commander PAF Station Mauripur
In office August 1956 – October 1957
Commander PAF Station Peshawar
In office December 1955 – August 1956
2nd Commandant RPAF College
In office 15 September 1948 – October 1949
Preceded by	Asghar Khan
Succeeded by	M. A. Rahman
Air attaché to High Commission of Pakistan, London
In office January 1948 – September 1948
Preceded by	Office established
Commander PAF Station Lahore
In office August 1947 – December 1947
Flight Commander Squadron Leader Operations 3 (Headquarters BCAIR)
In office 14 June 1945 – 30 September 1946

Personal details
- Born: Malik Nur Khan Awan; 22 February 1923 Tamman, Chakwal District, British India
- Died: 15 December 2011 (aged 88) CMH Rawalpindi, Pakistan
- Resting place: Tamman, Talagang, Pakistan
- Party: Pakistan Peoples Party (1988–89)
- Other political affiliations: Council Muslim League (1970-71); Independent (1985-88)
- Spouse: Begum Farhat (m. 1952)
- Children: 4
- Parent: Malik Mihr Khan (father)
- Relatives: Nawab of Kalabagh (uncle); Sardar Mumtaz Khan; Malik Sher Bahadur (nephew)
- Education: Colonel Brown Cambridge School; Chief's College, Lahore; Prince of Wales Royal Indian Military College (B.A.); No. 1 (I) SFTS; Joint Services Staff College (UK); RAF Staff College, Andover; PAF Staff College
- Civilian awards: See list
- Nickname: Nuroo

Military service
- Branch/service: Royal Indian Air Force (1941-1947); Pakistan Air Force (1947-1969)
- Years of service: 1941–1970
- Rank: Air Marshal
- Commands: See list: PAF Station Chaklala; RPAF College; PAF Station Peshawar; PAF Station Mauripur
- Battles/wars: World War II; Burma campaign (1944); Burma Campaign 1944–1945; Indo-Pakistani War of 1947; Waziristan rebellion (1948-1954); Indo-Pakistani War of 1965; Indo-Pakistani Air War of 1965
- Military awards: See list

Malik Nur Khan Awan (Note: Urdu: ملک نور خان اعوان; Sometimes spelled as Malik Noor Khan and erroneously as Mohammad Nur Khan.) (22 February 1923 — 15 December 2011) known as the Man of Steel, The Man With The Midas Touch, (Note: A reference to the Greek myth in which King Midas turned anything he touched into gold.) and informally, Nuroo, was a three-star rank officer who led the Pakistan Air Force (PAF) in the Indo-Pakistani air war of 1965, a politician, sports administrator, and airline executive, who served as the third Commander-in-Chief of the PAF from 1965 to 1969 and sixth Governor of West Pakistan from 1969 to 1970.

Born in the village of Tamman, Khan graduated from Prince of Wales Royal Indian Military College where he gained fame for his boxing skills and joined the Indian Air Force Volunteer Reserve in 1940. He was commissioned into the Royal Indian Air Force at the age of 17 as a fighter pilot in 1941. He also trained with the Royal Air Force as a gunner and bomber pilot. He was later deployed to Burma and flew sorties against Imperial Japan in World War II. In May 1944, he conducted a dive-bombing mission on a bridge at the Arakan front.

After the Partition of British India in 1947, Khan opted for the Royal Pakistan Air Force and commanded RPAF Station Chaklala. Subsequently, he became the first air attache of Pakistan to London and later the second commandant of the RPAF College. In 1958, Flight highlighted Air Commodore Nur Khan's leadership of No. 1 Group PAF and described him as "probably the youngest air officer anywhere in the world" at the age of 35.

Widely regarded as Pakistan's greatest administrator, Khan was known for his intellect and management abilities, which largely benefited the country in both sports and aviation. As managing director of Pakistan International Airlines (PIA) from 1959 to 1965 and again from 1973 to 1978, he transformed the airline into one of the world's frontline carriers. During this period, he acquired several properties for the airline, including the Roosevelt Hotel in New York City, the Scribe Hotel in Paris, the Central Hotel in Abu Dhabi, and the Minal Hotel in Riyadh. He also set up the intercontinental chain of hotels in Pakistan and the Malam Jabba ski resort. His tenure, along with that of his successor Asghar Khan, is often referred to as the "golden years of PIA" in the aviation community.

== Early life ==
Malik Nur Khan was born on 22 February 1923 in Tamman into a Punjabi Awan family with a distinguished military heritage. His father, Risaldar-Major Malik Mihr Khan (d. 1963) served as a Viceroy's Commissioned Officer from 1911 to 1945.

The family bore the title "Malik", meaning "Ruler", a designation commonly associated with Awan lineages. Among Nur Khan's relatives was his uncle Nawab of Kalabagh and Sardar Mumtaz Khan, a politician.

Nur Khan began his education at the Government Middle School in Tamman and attended the Colonel Brown Cambridge School, where he became friends with Bikram Singh, who later became a board member of the Civil and Military Gazette. He subsequently enrolled at the Chief's College, Lahore, where he earned a diploma in science. In 1934, he joined the Prince of Wales Royal Indian Military College, where cadets were divided into sections known as houses. Nur Khan and Asghar Khan were members of the Rawlinson House, while Sahabzada Yaqub Khan belonged to Kitchener House.

On his entry form, Principal Malcolm Hailey, 1st Baron Hailey, remarked: "An excellent military family from a very military center. The boy has been well educated and is more advanced than many Awans of his age. He is physically fit and should make an officer anyhow, he is the right type."

At the college, Khan gained a reputation as a "killer" boxer and a devout Muslim. He went on to earn a Bachelor of Arts in military administration. After completing his initial training at the Initial Training Wing in Lahore by May 1941, he proceeded to No. 1 (I) SFTS, finishing his flying syllabus by late November that year.

== Service years ==
=== Indian Air Force Volunteer Reserve (1940) ===
Nur Khan joined the Indian Air Force Volunteer Reserve during World War II and went for air crew training with the Royal Air Force in December 1940.

=== Royal Indian Air Force (1941-1947) ===
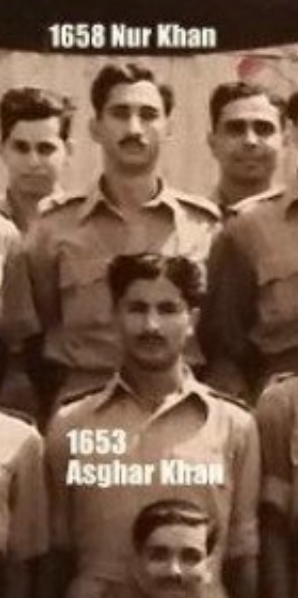
Nur Khan and Asghar Khan among 77 Pilot Officer Cadets at No. 1 (I) SFTS, 1941

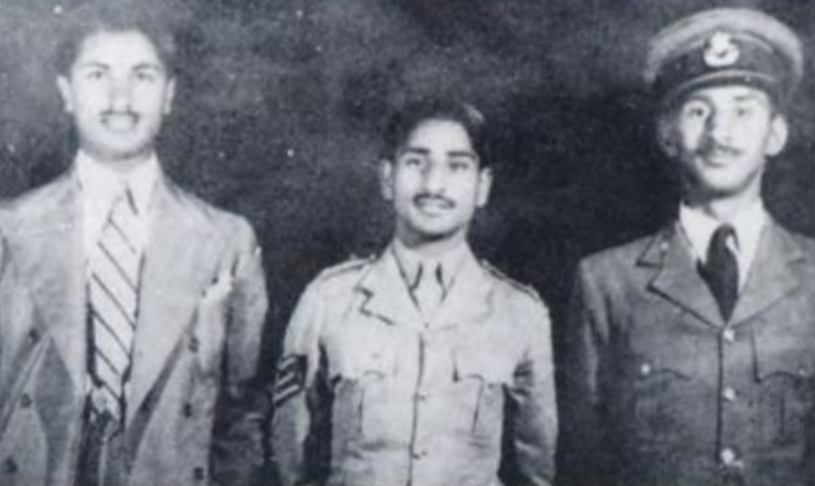
Asghar Khan, Cadet Captain Dharanidhar Jayal, and Nur Khan, at a PWRIMC reunion, 1941

After graduating from the Prince of Wales Royal Indian Military College as part of the 6th Pilots Course, Nur Khan was commissioned into the Royal Indian Air Force (RIAF) as a fighter pilot on 6 January 1941, at the age of 17. His family paid for his flying lessons from the Northern India Flying Club in Lahore, where he learned how to fly the de Havilland Tiger Moth and received his pilot's A-license.

==== World War II ====
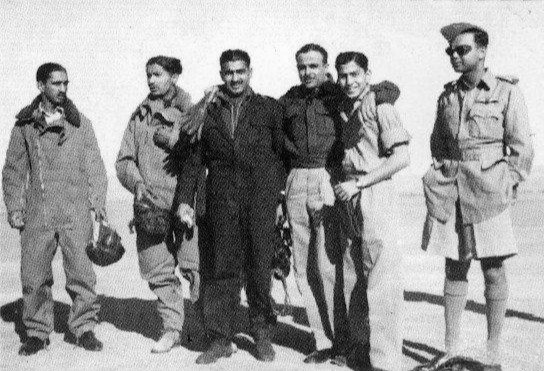
Nur Khan, Asghar Khan, Abdur Rahim Khan, Om Prakash Mehra, Minoo Merwan Engineer, and an unidentified officer, 1944

In the United Kingdom, Khan trained with the Royal Air Force as air crew and received additional training as a gunnery and bomber pilot. Upon returning to British India in 1942–43, he was deployed to the Burma campaign with the Royal Indian Air Force as part of the occupation forces fighting against Imperial Japan. On 20 May 1944, he dive bombed a bridge on the Arakan front.

In the mid-1940s, Nur Khan was an active supporter of the Pakistan Movement, a stance that often made him the subject of teasing by his commanding officer, Flight Lieutenant Erlic Pinto. Fellow officer, Raja Gohel, fought over Khan's pro-Pakistani views, leading to a physical altercation in which Nur struck Gohel. According to Air Commodore (retd) A.C. Chacko, "Raja went literally mad with fury and we had all the trouble to prevent him bashing Nooru's head with a brick."

=== Pakistan Air Force ===
==== Initial years (1947-1959) ====
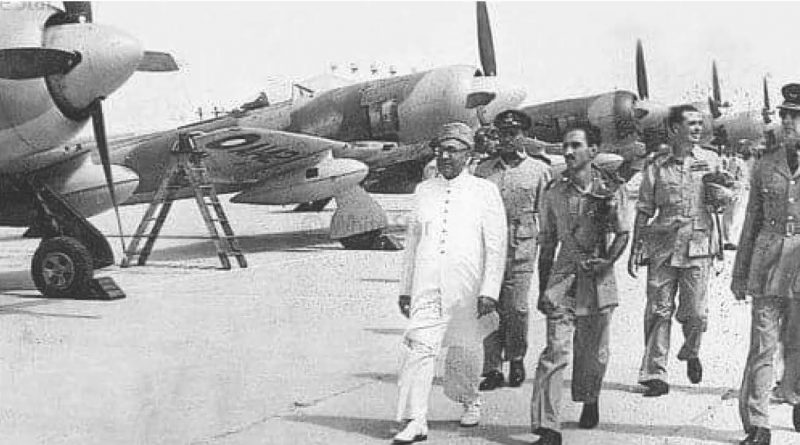
Prime Minister Liaquat Ali Khan (left) inspects the fighter arm of the RPAF accompanied by Wg Cdr Nur Khan (middle), and AVM Atcherley (far right) at Mauripur on Independence Day, 1950

King Zahir Shah arrives at PAF Station Mauripur with President Iskandar Mirza and Nahid Mirza, welcomed by Air Vice Marshal Asghar Khan and Air Commodore Nur Khan. The World record loop is showcased towards the end, 1958

After the Partition of British India on 14 August 1947, Nur Khan opted for the Royal Pakistan Air Force (RPAF) and was appointed the Commander of PAF Station Chaklala.

In January 1948, Khan was appointed as the first Pakistani air attaché to the High Commission of Pakistan, London. He was asked to return to Pakistan later that year and succeeded Asghar Khan as Commandant of the RPAF College on 15 September 1948.

Khan was posted to the Air Headquarters in Rawalpindi as the Director of Organisation where he remained involved in the induction of aircraft under U.S. military aid from January 1950 until March 1951. That month, Khan was selected for a course at the RAF Staff College, Andover. Ezer Weizman in his autobiography, recalled an interaction with Khan while they were both studying at the college: "The following day I was approached by Wing Commander Nur Khan of the Pakistani air force. He was a formidable fellow and I was glad that he was Pakistani and not an Egyptian."

Khan also advanced his military education at the Joint Services Staff College (UK) and the PAF Staff College.

In the mid-1950s, Nur Khan was appointed the F-86 Sabre program director. He strongly advocated for the induction of F-86 Sabres instead of the Republic F-84 Thunderjet, despite opposition by many, which often caused commotion during meetings, with Khan going as far as threatening to resign. He maintained his stance and the RPAF received the Sabres.

Promoted to Group Captain in July 1953, Nur Khan was appointed Assistant Chief of Staff (Air) under Chief of Staff Air Commodore L. E. Jarman.

In response to the threat posed by the Soviet Union, Group Captains Asghar Khan, Nur Khan, and Wing Commander Abdul Qadir developed an expansion plan for the Air Force in March 1954. This plan outlined a ten-year goal from 1954 to 1964, aiming to establish the RPAF with 768 aircraft across 44 squadrons. It included ten day-fighter squadrons, five night-fighter squadrons, six bomber squadrons, one reconnaissance squadron, twelve fighter-bomber squadrons, six tactical light bomber squadrons, two twin-engine and one four-engine transport squadrons, and two maritime squadrons.

From December 1955 to August 1956, Khan commanded PAF Station Peshawar. He commanded PAF Station Mauripur from August 1956 to October 1957, where he converted the aircraft of PAF fighter squadrons from piston to jet engines. He served at the Air Headquarters before he was appointed as Air Officer Commanding of the No. 1 Group PAF. At the time, the RPAF was organised into two groups: No. 1 Group Headquarters for Operations, based in Peshawar, and No. 2 Group Headquarters for Maintenance, located at Drigh Road. In 1958, Flight highlighted Air Commodore Nur Khan's leadership of No. 1 Group PAF, describing him as "probably the youngest air officer anywhere in the world" at the age of 35.

In 1957, Khan was appointed Chairman of the Committee responsible for the reorganisation of the Air Force.

==== Pakistan International Airlines (1959-1965) ====
In the afternoon of 6 March 1959, President Ayub Khan appointed Air Commodore Nur Khan as the Managing Director of the Pakistan International Airlines (PIA). He is credited with turning the airline into a profitable, internationally recognised entity. In late 1962, he received a two-year extension in his position by the Government of Pakistan. In February 1964, he was appointed as Chief Administrator of Civil Aviation and Tourism.

==== Commander-in-Chief (1965–1969) ====
Air Marshal Nur Khan praises his predecessor Air Marshal Asghar Khan for the PAF's success in the war, Squadron Leader Sajad Haider is seen briefing pilots

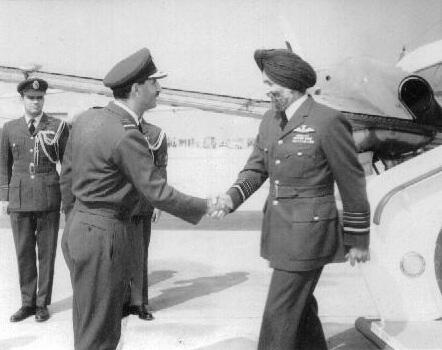
Chief of the IAF Arjan Singh arrives at PAF Station Peshawar to meet Nur Khan after the war, 1966

On 23 July 1965, the outgoing Commander-in-Chief Air Marshal Asghar Khan handed over command of the Pakistan Air Force to Air Marshal Nur Khan. Asghar Khan did not brief him about Operation Gibraltar in Indian administered Kashmir as Asghar was not informed by the Pakistan Army either.

After a hiatus of six years without flying fighter jets, Nur Khan quickly regained familiarity with the cockpit by doing quick checkouts on the Lockheed T-33 before switching to an F-104 Starfighter and F-86 Sabre.

The Air Headquarters was suspicious regarding the secret operations undertaken by the army, due to previous subsequent skirmishes on the eastern border. Nur Khan met with General Musa Khan who admitted that "something was afoot", with Nur Khan responding "this could mean war". However, Musa tried to assure Nur Khan that India would not retaliate. Very few details of the plan were conveyed to both Nur Khan and Naval Chief Vice Admiral Afzal Rahman Khan by the Pakistan Army leadership.

Still skeptical, Nur Khan was told by General Musa to meet with the General Officer Commanding of the 12th Infantry Division, Major General Akhtar Hussain Malik for further details, as he was in charge of Operation Gibraltar. Akhtar told him, "don't worry, because the plan is to send in some 800,000 infiltrators inside the occupied territory to throw out the Indian troops with the help of the local population". Akhtar also claimed that the plan was so perfectly designed and the Indians would not be able to retaliate, therefore the Air Force would not need to get into war-time mode.

Air Marshal Nur Khan placed the Air Force on red alert on 1 September 1965 as Operation Gibraltar came to a halt and Indian forces launched a major offensive against Pakistan. According to Air Commodore Sajad Haider, Khan was concerned about the survival of the Pakistani commandos in the Kashmir Valley as conventional supply routes were no longer viable. Since Pakistani regulars were on the battlefield, Khan consulted General Akhtar, and then authorised C-130 transport missions to deliver supplies. He personally accompanied the first flight with a "rudimentary radar" despite inclement weather, darkness, and the hazardous peaks of the valley. During the mission, when the aircraft's pilot, Group Captain Zahid Butt, overshot the designated drop zone, Nur Khan ordered him to make a second attempt and the supplies were delivered on target. According to Haider, "news of this propelled the morale of the PAF to incredible heights."

During the war, Air Marshal Nur Khan ordered Flight Lieutenant Farooq Umar to take his F-104 fighter jet to an altitude above the Indian Air Force base in Amritsar and break the sound barrier over it. Umar successfully accomplished the mission and Khan ordered him to repeat it. Soon thereafter, Indian radio channels began reporting numerous Pakistani F-86 Sabre aircraft attacking the base. These reports also noted the sound of large explosions occurring while in actuality those sounds were the two sonic booms done by Umar.

===== Post-war activities =====
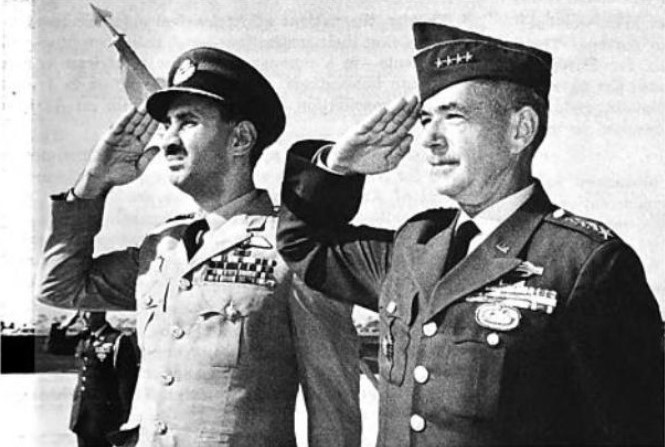
Air Marshal Nur Khan and General Theodore J. Conway, Commander-in-Chief of U.S. Strike Command, salute the colors during an arrival ceremony on the MacDill AFB flightline, October 1968

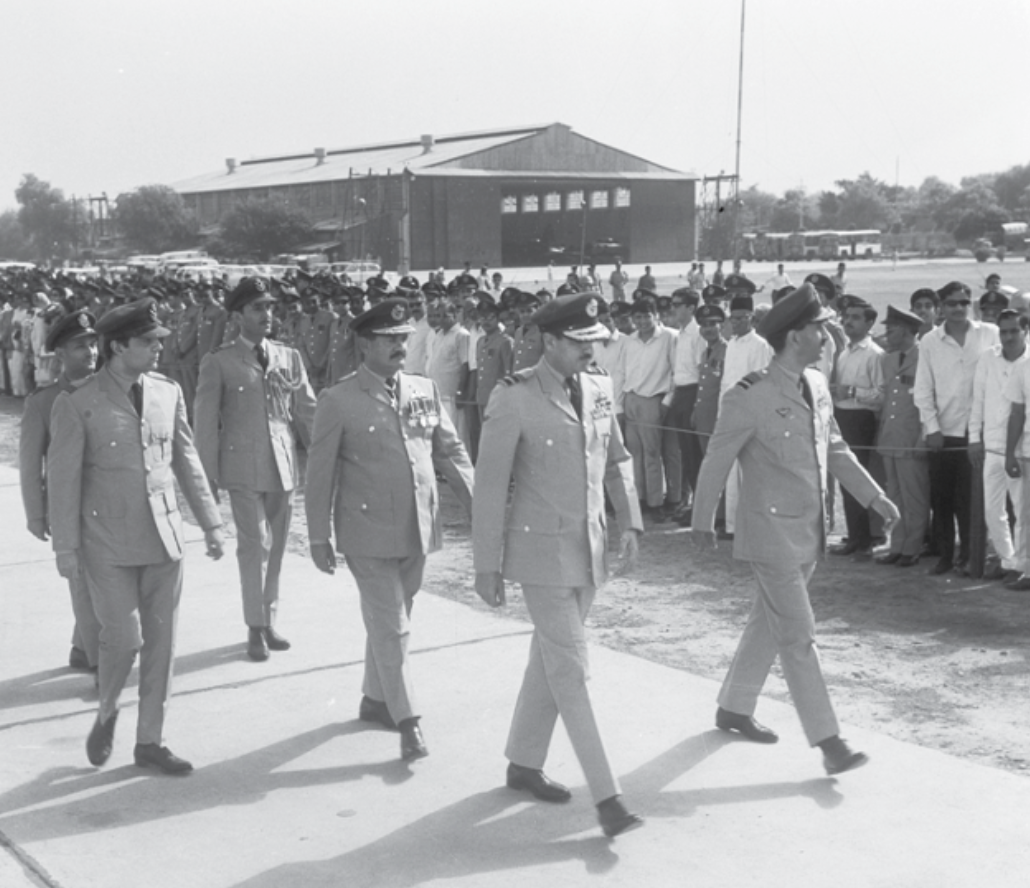
Abdur Rahim Khan takes over as Commander-in-Chief from Air Marshal Nur Khan, walking side by side, 1969

Air Marshal Nur Khan made two visits to China for the procurement of F-6 jets, the first visit was in November 1965 and the second in December 1967. According to Air Marshal Inamul Haque Khan, "Normally Premier Zhou Enlai did not meet military chiefs, but he had a liking for Nur Khan and thus graciously had dinner with him. F-6s were provided promptly at a crucial juncture almost free of cost, when we were passing through bad times."

On Pakistan Day 1966, the PAF exhibited Chinese weapons for the first time, including five Chinese-made Type 59 tanks and four Chinese-made Shenyang F-6 fighter jets, one of which was piloted by Nur Khan.

Air Marshal Nur Khan ordered the Pakistan Air Force to serve the Military of the Arab League in the Six-Day War.

===== Ministership (1969) =====
Nur Khan served as Minister of Communications, Health, Labour and Social Welfare, Education, Rehabilitation and Works Division, and Family Planning Division from 5 April 1969 except for the Scientific and Technological Research Division to which he was appointed on 7 May 1969 until 3 August 1969.

On 3 April 1969, President Yahya Khan appointed a four-man military council of administration to run Pakistan. He appointed Air Marshal Nur Khan, Vice Admiral S. M. Ahsan, and General Abdul Hamid Khan as Deputy Martial Law Administrators.

== Political career ==
=== Governor of West Pakistan (1969–1970) ===
Nur Khan's tenure was renewed and his retirement was overturned by President Yahya Khan who appointed him as the Governor of West Pakistan on 1 September 1969. He would go on to make major reforms in the country's political and educational structure.

A committee to overhaul the education system was set up with Nur Khan at the helm. The committee recommended that English should not remain the medium of instruction in Pakistan, rather Urdu and Bengali should be used.

In late 1969, Khan set up 19 industrial advisory panels for devising ways and means of stepping up production in all major industries in West Pakistan. He also supported the devolution of the controversial One Unit program and oversaw its termination in 1970. He announced new labour and educational policies to limit the role of politics in universities.

=== 1970s and 1980s ===
Nur Khan joined the Council Muslim League in 1970. Throughout this period, Zulfikar Ali Bhutto criticised Asghar Khan and leaders of the Council Muslim League including Nur Khan for supporting Sheikh Mujibur Rahman.

On 5 October 1970 in Lahore, Nur Khan accused Zulfikar Ali Bhutto of conspiring with certain bureaucratic elements within General Yahya Khan's government who sought to maintain dictatorial rule. He suggested that Bhutto was trying to seize power through backdoor dealings with support from the Pakistan Army.

Following the 1970 Pakistani general election, Asghar Khan and Nur Khan called for the transfer of power to Sheikh Mujibur Rahman and his Awami League, who had secured the majority.

Nur Khan ran as an independent candidate in the 1985 Pakistani general election and was elected as a member of the 7th National Assembly from NA-43 (Attock-III) after receiving 69,828 votes.

In 1987, he joined the Pakistan Peoples Party (PPP) and contested from Constituency NA-44 in the 1988 Pakistani general election. Khan received 60,962 votes and lost to Islami Jamhoori Ittehad (IJI) candidate Sardar Mansoor Hayyat Khan Tamman who received 75,928 votes. He conceded his defeat and retired from politics soon after.

== Civilian career ==
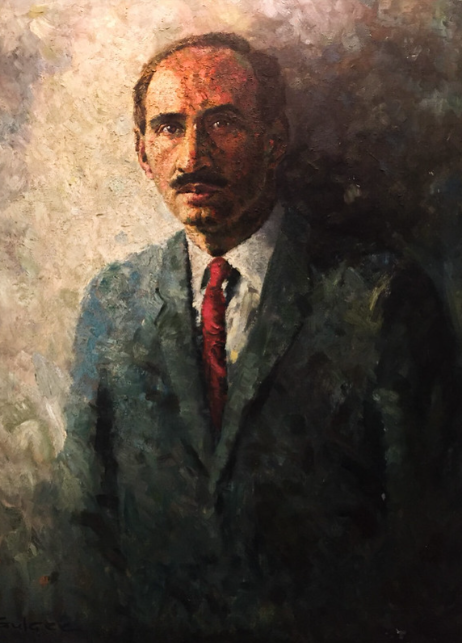
Portrait of Nur Khan by Gulgee, c. 1960

=== Director of PIA (1973-1978) and Air Malta (1974-1979) ===
In November 1973, Nur Khan was specially requested by Prime Minister Zulfikar Ali Bhutto to return to the Pakistan International Airlines (PIA) as managing director. During this term, the airline began operating wide-body DC-10s and Boeing 747s. The iconic popular green and gold aircraft livery was introduced and Khan kept the PIA out of Pakistan's turbulent political arena, turning it into a sound commercial airline.

Nur Khan was part of the delegation that accompanied Prime Minister Zulfikar Ali Bhutto and his wife Nusrat Bhutto on their official state visit to Washington, D.C. on the invitation of President Gerald Ford from 4 February to 7 February 1975. In March 1976, Khan reported that the airline had achieved its highest growth in its history the previous year.

Although he was succeeded by Enver Jamall in 1978, Khan remained involved with the airline as head of PIA Investment Limited, a venture widely regarded as his brainchild, which spearheaded the airline's expansion into the hospitality sector. In 1979, Khan alongside King Faisal of Saudi Arabia, acquired the Roosevelt Hotel under a 20-year lease agreement that included an option to purchase the hotel for a fixed price of $36.5 million.

He was appointed as the Director of the Maltese airline, Air Malta, on 19 February 1974 and resigned on 9 November 1979. He was decorated with the Medal for Service to the Republic on 28 August 1979.

==== 1978 Hijacking incident ====
On 20 January 1978, PIA flight PK-453 heading from Sukkur Airport to Karachi, was hijacked shortly after breakfast service when a man named Nazir Mohammad, armed with a revolver and dynamite stick entered the cockpit and ordered the pilots, Captain Khaldoon Ghani and First Officer Kadir Gabol, to divert the flight to India for his cancer treatment. Ghani told Nazir that the aircraft did not have enough fuel to go to India and that the plane could land in Karachi only. Karachi Airport was informed of the hijacking at 10:30am where the plane landed at 10:55am.

During the negotiations, Nazir demanded Rs. 10 million (equivalent to Rs. 51 million or US$180,000 in 2021) and US$1,000,000 (equivalent to $4,936,224 in 2025) for the release of passengers and crew, stating that he needed the money to enjoy his final days cut short by cancer. Nur Khan told Nazir that the PIA can make arrangements for treatment and offered to be kept as a hostage aboard the aircraft in exchange for the release of passengers and crew. Nazir rejected the offers but allowed the supply of food and water for the hostages in the aircraft. By night time, Nazir had released a total of 14 passengers and an air hostess.

Nazir sent a message to authorities that he wanted to talk to an "important person", Nur Khan accompanied by a Pakistan Army officer, entered the aircraft at around 11:50 PM. Following an hour of negotiations, Nur Khan pretended to walk away but abruptly turned around, attempting to seize the revolver from Nazir. The gun went off and Khan was shot at point-blank range in his side. The aircraft crew then overpowered Nazir and he was arrested. Khan was subsequently taken to PNS Shifa Hospital. The bullet was lodged about a centimeter from his spine. Nazir was later identified as a resident of Mianwali in his 30s, who worked in a hotel in Sukkur under the alias of Aslam Khan. He told police he was a deserter of the Pakistan Army Corps of Engineers.

The same year, Nur Khan was awarded the Hilal-e-Shujaat (Crescent of Courage) for his actions.

==== Squash Federation ====
From 1951 to 1963, Pakistan achieved remarkable success in Squash by winning the most coveted title, the British Open. Thereafter, it was a barren period for squash in the country as Pakistani players failed to get the title, with the closest being Aftab Jawaid, who managed to reach the finals and was a runner-up in 1966, 1967, and 1971. However, he did become the first Pakistani to win the British Amateur title in 1964 which was later discontinued.

When Nur Khan took over as the managing director of Pakistan International Airlines (PIA) for the second time in 1973, he immediately took revolutionary steps and initiated what was known as the PIA Colts scheme. Young promising boys were scouted and given a monthly stipend, subsequently being coached and sent to participate in international tournaments with the PIA bearing the travel expenses. Whoever performed well on the international circuit was given permanent employment in the airline. Additionally, if any player achieved some major success in prime events, they were rewarded with a departmental promotion.

This led to a surfeit of world class Pakistani players in the 1970s, namely Qamar Zaman, Gogi Alauddin, Hiddy Jahan, Mohibullah Khan and others, with there being at least six to seven Pakistanis among the top 10 in the world rankings.

On Nur Khan's request in 1975, legendary four-time winner of the British Open Squash Championships, Azam Khan, who was running a squash club in England, trained Qamar Zaman, Mohibullah Khan, and Torsam Khan for the British Open. Subsequently, Qamar Zaman won and bought back the title to Pakistan after a 12-year drought.

Additionally, Nur Khan gave the squash world Jahangir Khan, a pure PIA colts product who would later become the greatest squash player of all time. The Pakistan Open initiated in 1980 and became a prestigious tournament. Pakistan also hosted the British Open Squash Championships.

In 1976, Nur Khan built the PIA Squash Complex in Karachi.

=== Chairman Board of Control for Cricket in Pakistan (1980-1984) ===
Nur Khan was appointed as the President of the Board of Control for Cricket in Pakistan (BCCP) on 10 February 1980, to manage the disarrayed cricket affairs after the resignation of K. M. Azhar, following Pakistan's defeat in the test series against India.

He lobbied and pushed for the establishment of the Asian Cricket Council. Khan and President Zia-ul-Haq are accredited for convincing Pakistani cricketer Imran Khan to return to cricket after he retired following the 1987 Cricket World Cup.

== Personal life ==
"The more power you have, it demands much more from you; and if service to mankind on your part lacks, you have failed to discharge your responsibility, and you will be held accountable. Justice to the masses and sincerity of purpose in your actions must speak for themselves."- Nur Khan

Nur Khan married Shahzadi Farhat Sultan Begum in 1952. She was the eldest daughter of Captain Aziz ul-Mulk Shahzada Sultan Aziz, belonging to the Durrani dynasty. Farhat was also a cousin of Abida Sultan. They had four children. A son, Mansoor Khan, and three daughters, Sima Bibi, Nighat Bibi, and Faiqa Bibi. Begum Farhat died on 19 July 2016 after a prolonged illness and her funeral was held the following day at PAF Base Nur Khan.

Their daughter, Dr. Faiqa Qureshi, died in a traffic accident in Dinwiddie County, Virginia on 29 December 2025 when her vehicle struck an obstruction on the road and caught fire. She was 75 years old.

== Later life ==
In 1993, Nur Khan was appointed to chair the Commission on Education in the caretaker government of Prime Minister Moeen Qureshi. He retired from public life after the commission completed its work.

On 29 August 2006, he made headlines for his criticism of the actions of the leaders of the Pakistan Muslim League (Q) (PML-Q), particularly President Shujaat Hussain and Secretary General Mushahid Hussain. Khan questioned their decision and hypocrisy to continue supporting the military regime of General Musharraf, especially after the controversial death of Akbar Bugti, at the hands of the Pakistan Army. Khan said that Bugti's death was a blow to national unity.

He also pointed out that Shujaat and Mushahid portrayed themselves as close friends of Bugti, with Shujaat even acknowledging his indebtedness to him for saving his father's life when Prime Minister Zulfikar Ali Bhutto had ordered Bugti, who was the Governor of Balochistan, to have Shujaat's father Chaudhry Zahoor Elahi killed while he was in prison. Khan further criticised Mushahid's role and said that Bugti had included Mushahid as one of the three individuals entrusted to hear his case, with a promise to accept their verdict. Khan questioned: "Is this how one pays back trusted friends?"

== Illness and death ==
Nur Khan had been admitted into the CMH Rawalpindi on 12 December 2011, as he was suffering from anemia and a chest infection. He died on 15 December 2011.

=== Tributes ===
Following Nur Khan's death, he was widely praised as one of Pakistan's most influential military and sports administrators. Former Commander-in-Chief Asghar Khan described him as a "patriotic, devoted and a decorated son of Pakistan," adding that Nur Khan "served the country brilliantly and led the PAF from the front in 1965 war, the country and PAF would never forget him". Air Commodore Sajad Haider remembered him as "a man who considered nothing impossible and proved it with his professional excellence, integrity and intrepidness."

Pakistani squash legend Jahangir Khan commented, "Under him we had a golden period in cricket, squash and hockey and from Imran Khan to Zaheer Abbas and from me to Jansher Khan he helped develop a lot of players." Similarly, former cricketer Wasim Akram remarked: "We can't find an administrator like him now, what he did for sports in Pakistan will always be remembered." while Pakistani Olympian Hanif Khan said: "Field hockey is what it is because of him and because of his contribution, Pakistan held Olympic, World Cup and Champions Trophy titles simultaneously."

Chief of Air Staff Rao Qamar Suleman expressed grief over his demise and recalled how Khan led the Pakistan Air Force and achieved parity over the three time larger Indian Air Force in the 1965 war and was "the beacon of inspiration for all rank and file" of the air force.

=== Legacy and commemorations ===
In 1976, Herbert Feldman in his book, The End & The Beginning: Pakistan 1969-1971 noted, "Air-Marshal Nur Khan was a man cast in very different mold. An Awan from Campbellpur District in the Punjab, he was an efficient, aggressive officer with a touch of showmanship. He had the reputation of being tough and competent, with no patience for sluggards or backsliders. He was, for some time, managing director of Pakistan International Airlines and was credited with having done the job well. In the new set-up of March 1969 he was also regarded as the loner, the masterless man."

On 22 February 2012, the Pakistan Air Force (PAF) Auditorium was renamed to Nur Khan Auditorium on what would have been his 89th birthday. Here, several colleagues and friends paid tribute to him, including retired civil servant Roedad Khan, who said, "He was a man of unbounded vitality". In addition, the Pakistan Post launched a commemorative postage stamp in his honour. Similarly, Air Chief Marshal Rao Qamar Suleman presented a crest to Khan's widow, Begum Farhat.

In commemoration of his service, PAF Base Chaklala was renamed PAF Base Nur Khan on 10 October 2012. The first Nur Khan Memorial Open Golf Championship was inaugurated on 25 May 2015 at the PAF Golf Club in Peshawar. In June 2015, it was reported that there was a "Nur Khan Trophy for the Best in Avionics Technology" awarded to non-commissioned officers of the Pakistan Air Force.

== Awards and decorations ==
- Sitara-e-Quaid-e-Azam, 1958
- Sitara-e-Pakistan, 12 January 1963
- Midalja għall-Qadi tar-Repubblika, 28 August 1979

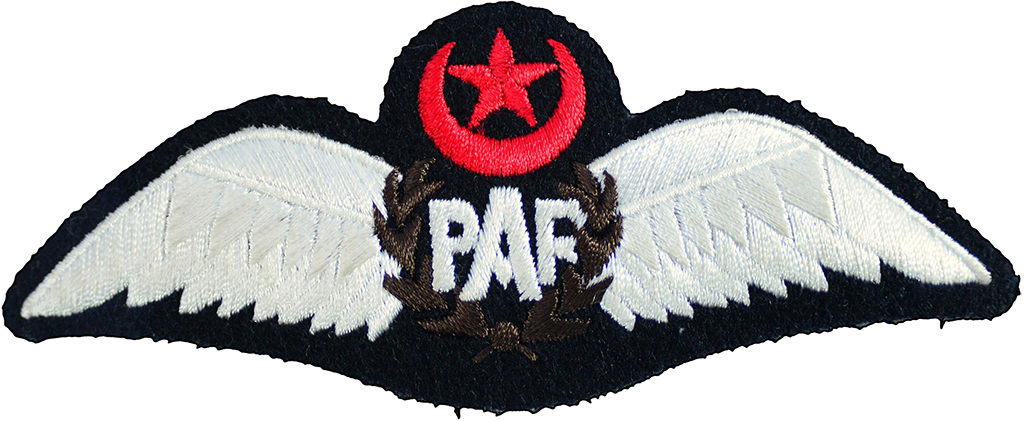

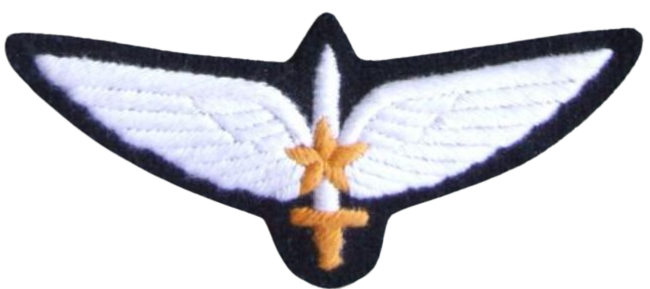

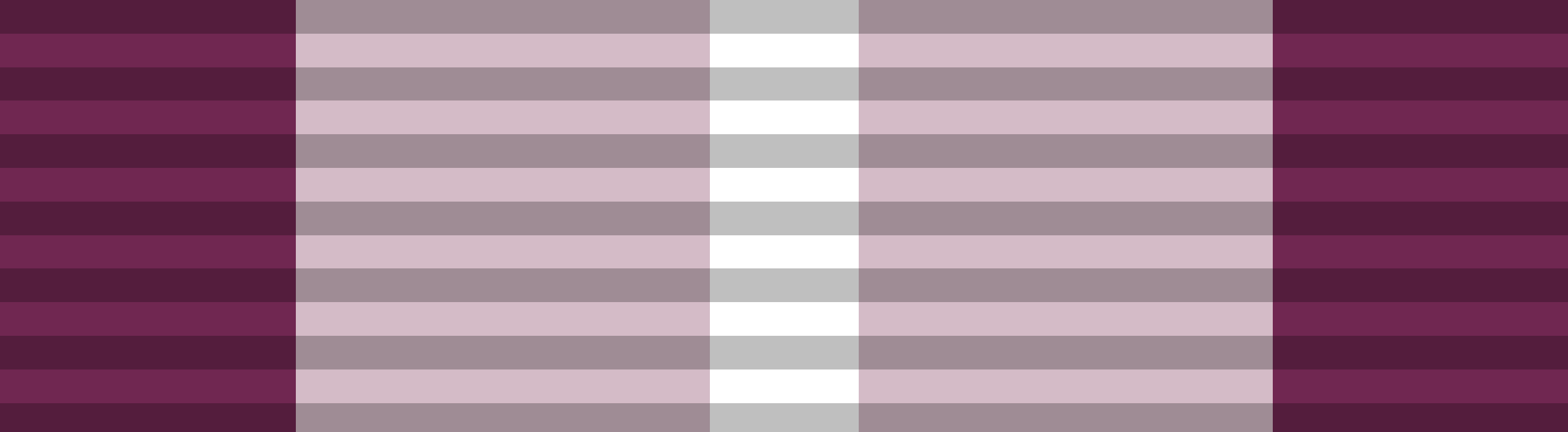
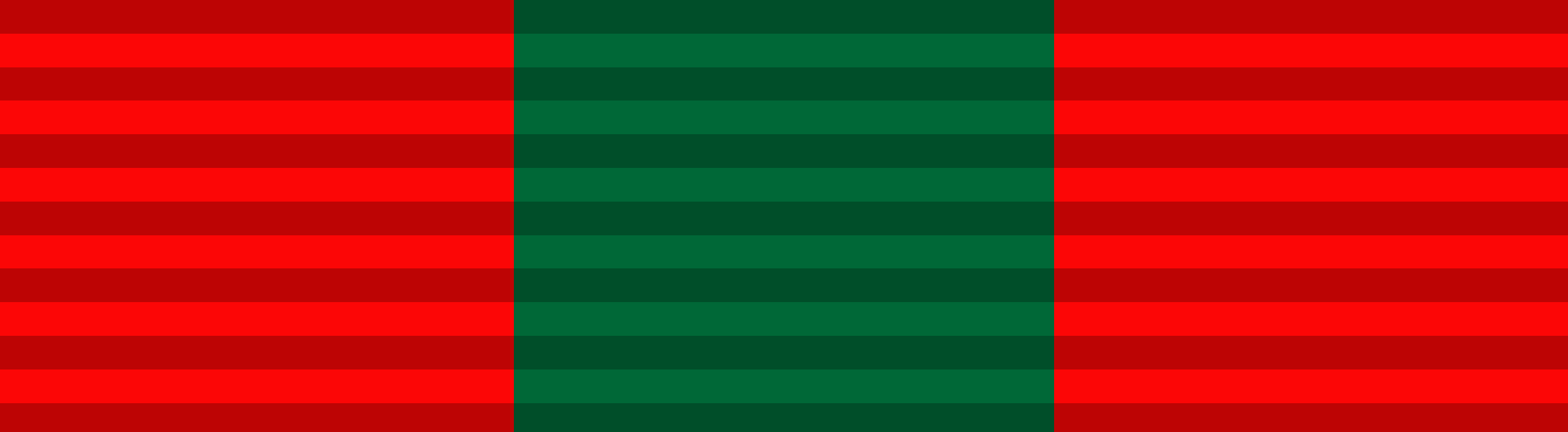
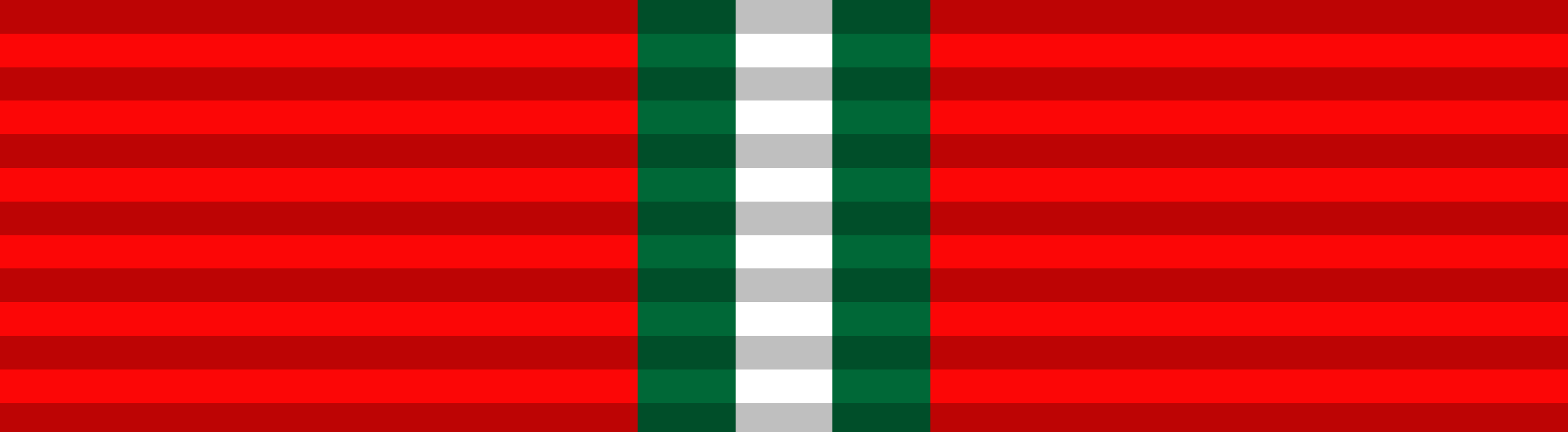

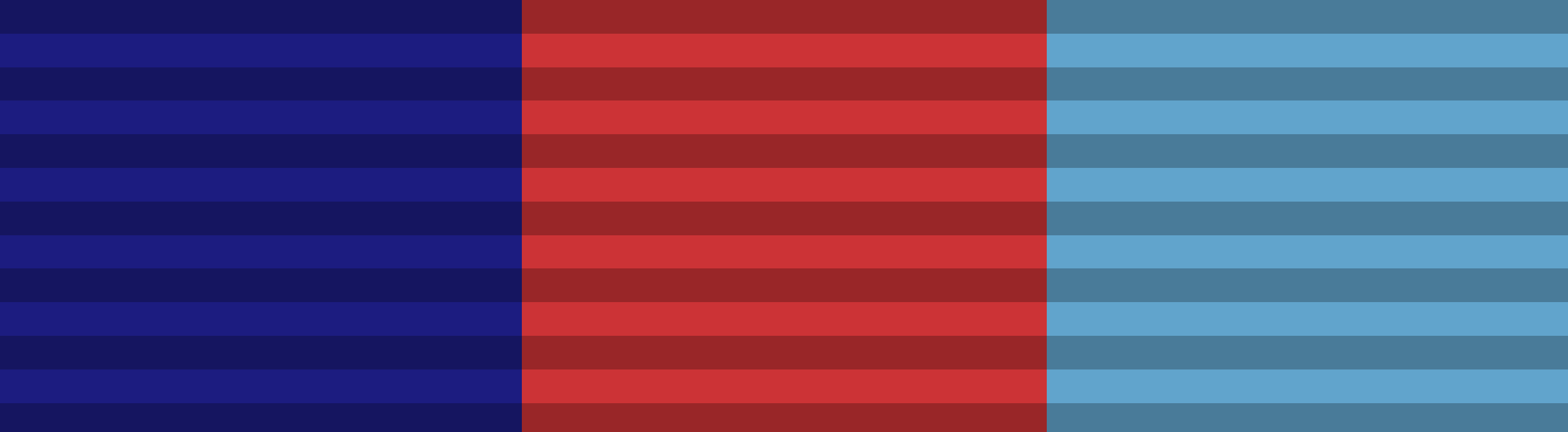

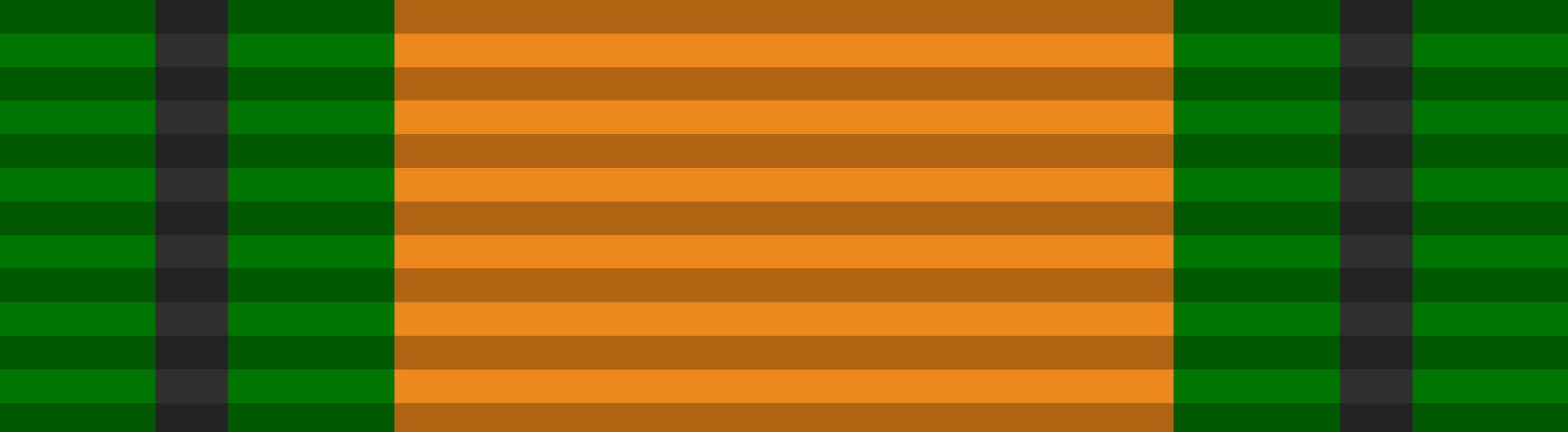

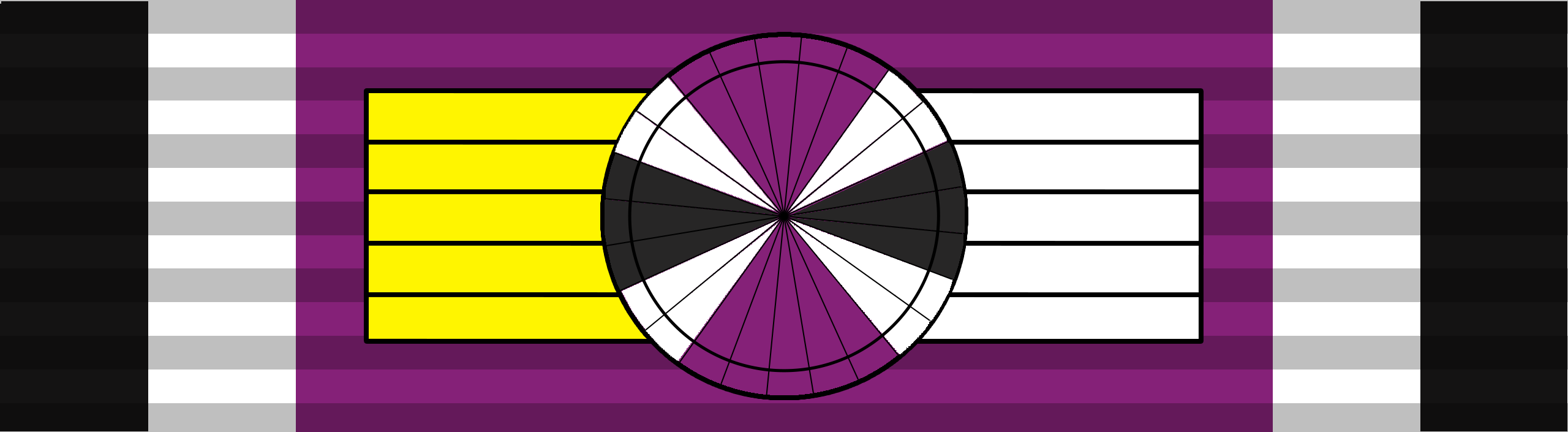

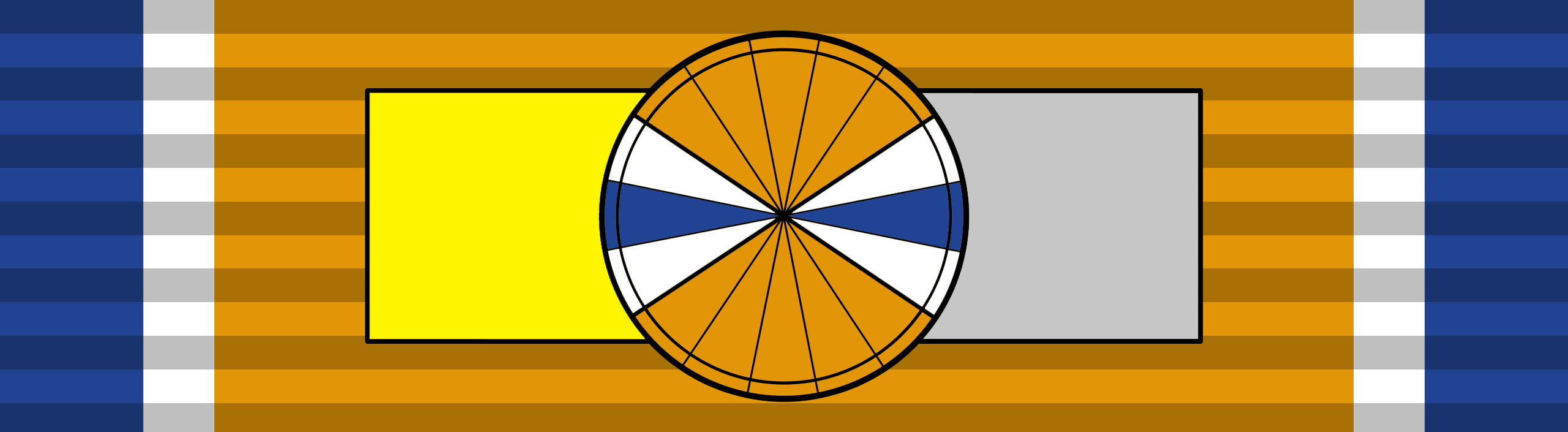

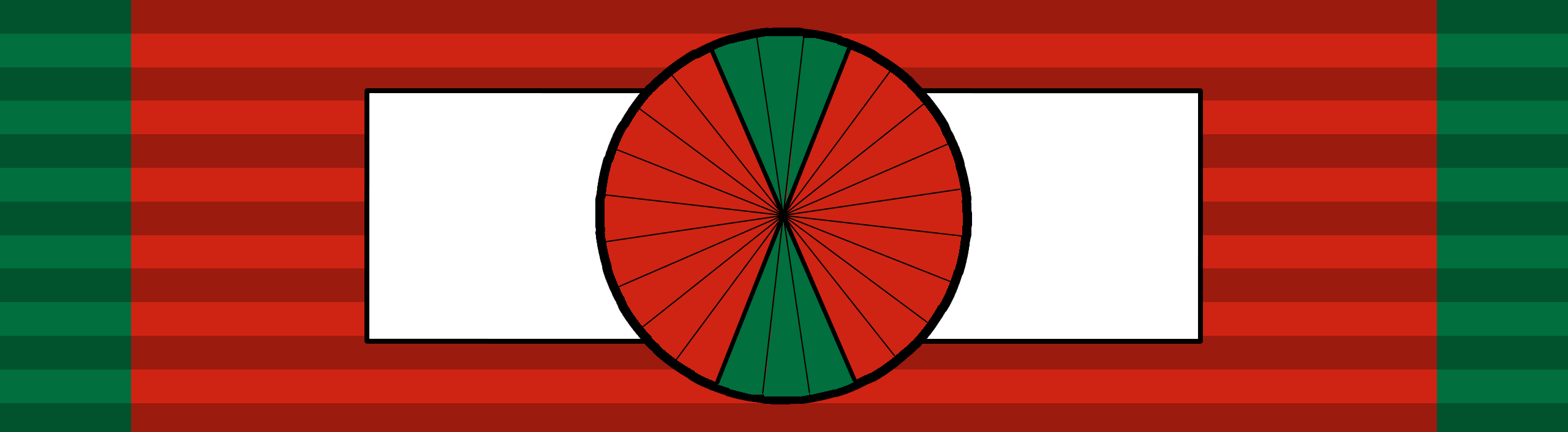

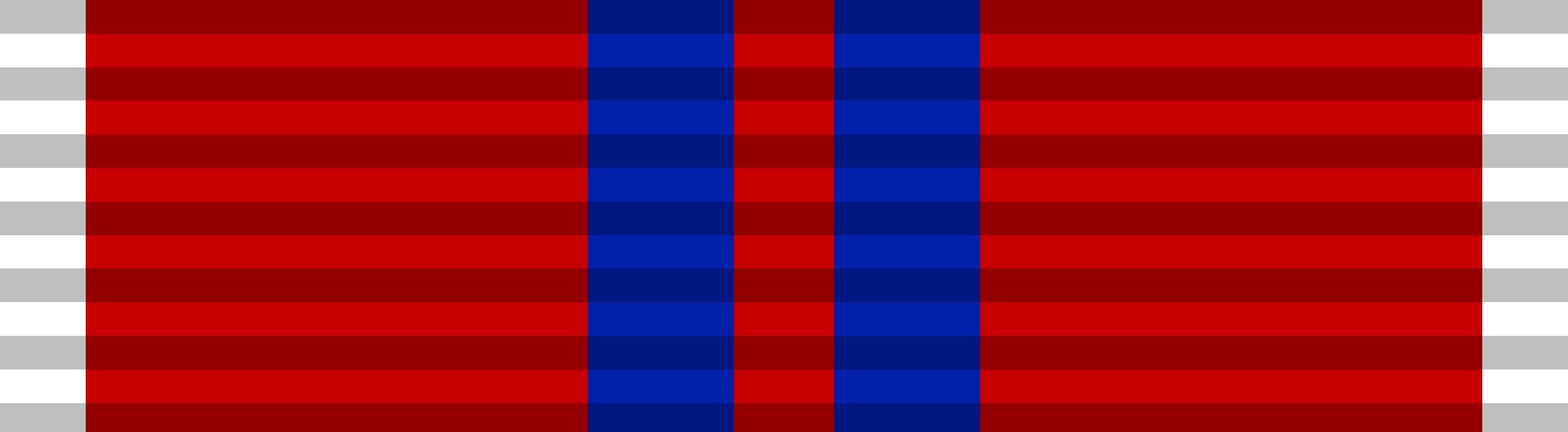

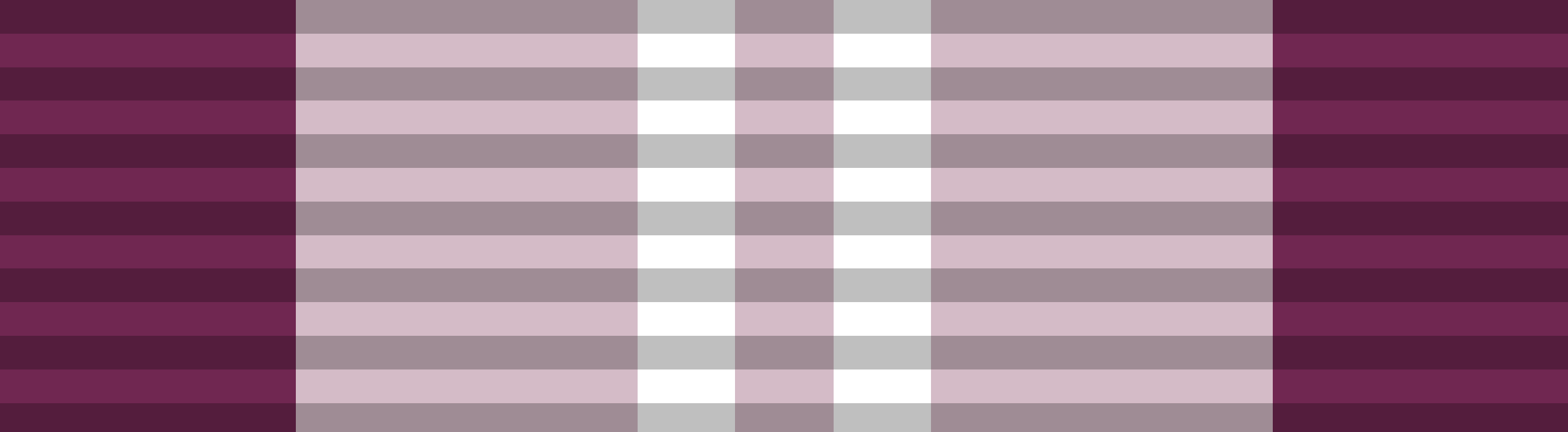

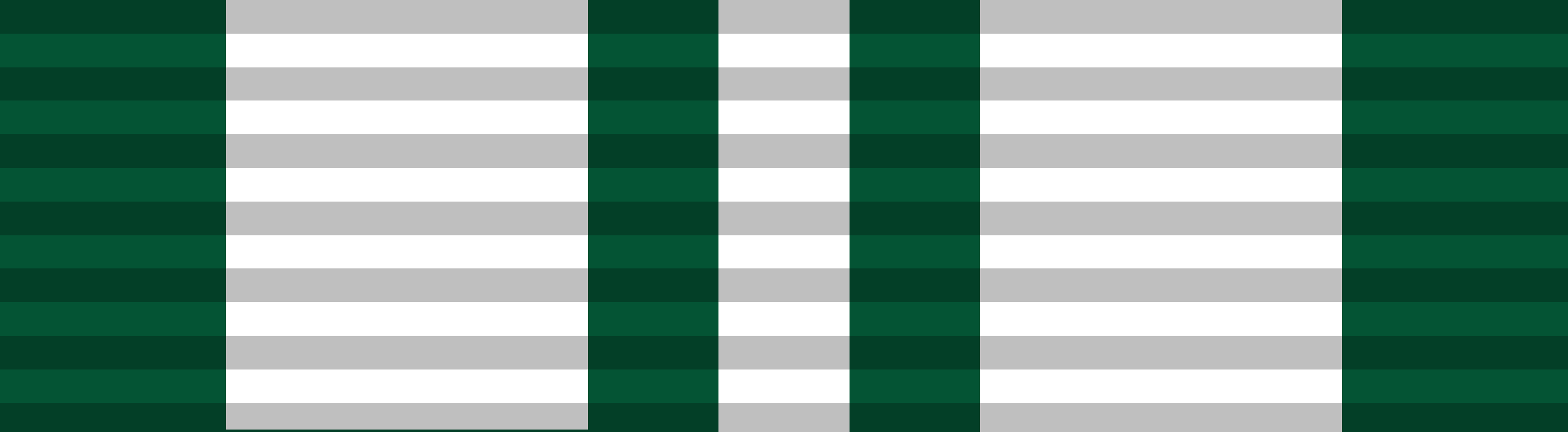

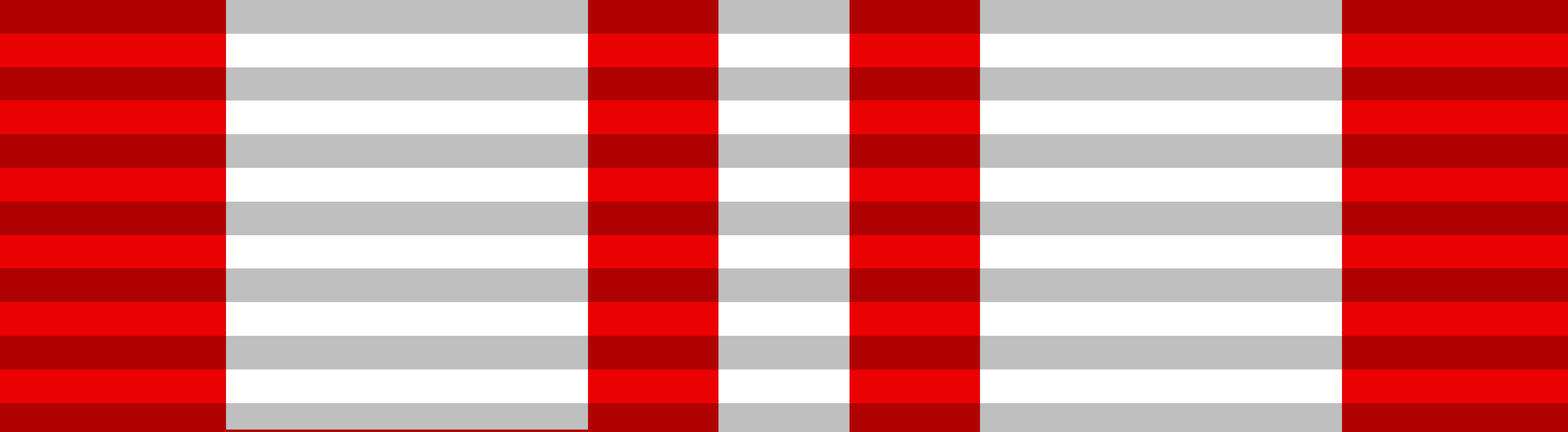

PAF GD(P) Badge RED (More than 3000 Flying Hours)
Pakistan Army; Paratrooper Wings; 1965
Hilal-e-Quaid-e-Azam (Crescent of the Great Leader)	Hilal-e-Jurat (Crescent of Courage) 1965 War	Hilal-e-Shujaat (Crescent of Bravery); 1978	Midalja għall-Qadi tar-Repubblika (Medal for Service to the Republic of Malta); 1979
1939-1945 Star	Burma Star; 1945	Defence Medal; 1945	War Medal 1939-1945
Pakistan Medal (Pakistan Tamgha) 1947	Order of Independence (Jordan) (Grand Officer) (Wisam al-Istiqial)	Order of Orange-Nassau (Netherlands) (Grand Officer) (Orde van Oranje-Nassau)	National Order of the Cedar (Lebanon) (Grand Officer) (Wisām al-Arz al-Waṭaniy)
Queen Elizabeth II Coronation Medal 1953	Tamgha-e-Qayam-e-Jamhuria (Republic Commemoration Medal); 1956	Sitara-e-Quaid-e-Azam (Star of the Great Leader) 1958	Sitara-e-Pakistan (Star of Pakistan) (Commander of the Order of Pakistan) 1963
Sitara-e-Khidmat (Star of Service)	Sitara-e-Harb 1965 War (War Star 1965)	Tamgha-e-Jang 1965 War (War Medal 1965)	Tamgha-e-Diffa (Defence Medal) 1965 War Clasp

=== Foreign decorations ===
Foreign Awards
UK	1939-1945 Star
UK	Burma Star
UK	Defence Medal
UK	War Medal 1939-1945
UK	Queen Elizabeth II Coronation Medal
Jordan	Order of Independence
Netherlands	Order of Orange-Nassau
Lebanon	National Order of the Cedar
Malta	Midalja għall-Qadi tar-Repubblika

== Effective dates of promotion ==
Insignia	Rank	Date
	Air Marshal	5 July 1965
	Air Vice Marshal	19 May 1964
	Air Commodore	1957
	Group Captain	July 1953
	Wing Commander	15 September 1948
	Squadron Leader	November 1946
	Flight Lieutenant	14 June 1945
	Flying Officer	October 1942
	Pilot Officer	6 January 1941

== Notes ==
Military offices
Preceded by Asghar Khan	C-in-C of the PAF; 1965–1969	Succeeded by Abdur Rahim Khan
Political offices
Preceded by Tikka Khan	Governor of West Pakistan; 1969–1970	Succeeded by Attiqur Rahman
