= Safdar Butt =

Pakistani cricket administrator (1928–2006)

Lieutenant General Ghulam Safdar Butt غلام صفدر بٹ
- Born: Ghulam Safdar Butt; 13 March 1928; Sukkur, Sindh, British Indian Empire, (present-day Pakistan)
- Died: 1 May 2006 (aged 78); Lahore, Pakistan
- Burial place: Cavalry Ground Graveyard, Lahore
- Military career
- Allegiance: Pakistan
- Branch: Pakistan Army
- Service years: 1948–1987
- Rank: Lieutenant General
- Nickname: Safdar
- Service number: PA – 2725
- Unit: Pakistan Army Corps of Engineers
- Commands: DG Frontier Works Organization; DG Lowari Tunnel Organization; Managing Director PARCO; Military Engineering Service Pakistan Army Corps of Engineers
- Conflicts: Indo-Pakistani War of 1965; Indo-Pakistani War of 1971
- Awards: Sitara-e-Basalat; Hilal-i-Imtiaz (Military)
- Other work: Chairman WAPDA; Chairman Pakistan Cricket Board; Chairman Sui Northern Gas Pipelines Limited

Ghulam Safdar Bhatt/Butt an ethnic Kashmiri (13 March 1928 – 1 May 2006) was the first three-star rank General in the Corps of Engineers of the Pakistan Army. He also held the distinction of being the first PhD of the Pakistan Army.

== Military career ==
He was commissioned in the Pakistan Army in 1950 after graduating from the Pakistan Military Academy (PMA). He was part of the first PMA Long Course which was the first course to graduate from the PMA that was selected, trained and graduated in Pakistan after its partition from India on 14 August 1947. His career spanned many areas which included:

Professorship at the Military College of Engineering

Professor of Highways, Airfields, Soil and Foundation engineering

Integral work on the Karakorum Highway KKH

Platoon Commander at PMA

Director General Frontier Works Organization,

Director General Lowari Tunnel Organization (LTO)

Managing Director Pak Arab Refinery Co (PARCO)

Chairman Water & Power Development Authority (WAPDA),

Chairman Pakistan Cricket Board (PCB),

Chairman National Highway Authority (NHA)

Chairman Sui Northern Gas Pipelines Ltd (SNGPL)]

== Post retirement work ==
He was President of the Pakistan Cricket Board, serving in the position from February 1984 to February 1988. He was a founding member, Secretary General and President of the Alpine Club of Pakistan.

== Death ==
A passionate mountaineer, he died on May 1, 2006, after an aggressive bout with a brain tumor at the age of 78, and was buried the same day.
