= PP-5 Attock-V =

Constituency of the Punjabi Provincial Legislature, Pakistan

- Constituency for the Provincial Assembly of Punjab
- Region: Jand Tehsil and Pindi Gheb Tehsil (partly) of Attock District

Current constituency
- Created from: PP-19 Attock-V

PP-5 Attock-V (پی پی-5، اٹک-5) is a Constituency of Provincial Assembly of Punjab.

== General elections 2024 ==
Provincial election 2024: PP-5 Attock-V
Party	Candidate	Votes	%	±%
PML(N)	Malik Aitbar Khan	46,387	29.21	
Independent	Malik Jamshed Altaf (Note: Filed nomination papers as PTI candidate but ECP allowed him to run as an Independent)	43,917	27.66	
TLP	Syed Atif Hussain Shah Gillani	41,574	26.18	
Pakistan Nazriati Party	Shaheer Haider Malik	13,871	8.74	
JI	Hafiz Tanveer Ahmed	6,708	4.22	
PRHP	Shams UI Haq Alvi	2,851	1.80	
Others	Others (eight candidates)	3,489	2.19	
Turnout		163,454	53.56	
Total valid votes		158,797	97.15	
Rejected ballots		4,657	2.15	
Majority		2,470	1.55	
Registered electors		305,175		
hold				

== General Election 2018 ==
In 2018 Pakistani general election, Malik Jamshed Altaf a ticket holder of PTI won PP-5 Attock V election by taking 57,333 votes.

Provincial election 2018: PP-5 Attock-V
Party	Candidate	Votes	%	±%
PTI	Malik Jamshaid Altaf	57,333	36.94	
PML(N)	Malik Bahadur Yar	36,155	23.29	
TLP	Syed Ahsan Mehmood Shah Gillani	29,219	18.83	
Independent	Syed Abbas Mohiuddin	12,165	7.84	
Independent	Manzar Amir	8,040	5.18	
Independent	Malik Haroon Ramzan	5,653	3.64	
MMA	Raziq Dad Khan	5,201	3.35	
Others	Others (three candidates)	1,449	0.94	
Turnout		162,110	58.97	
Total valid votes		155,215	95.75	
Rejected ballots		6,895	4.25	
Majority		21,178	13.65	
Registered electors		274,909		
hold				

== General elections 2013 ==
Provincial election 2013: PP-19 Attock-V
Party	Candidate	Votes	%	±%
PML(N)	Zafar Iqbal	37,745	33.28	
Independent	Manzer Ameer	27,201	23.98	
PTI	Syed Abbass Muhi Ud Din	26,240	23.14	
JI	Raziq Dad Khan	8,006	7.06	
HDP	Sardar Muhammad Ameer Khan	6,796	5.99	
JUI (F)	Sardar Mumtaz Khan	4,707	4.15	
JUP (N)	Muhammad Daud Mustafai	1,737	1.53	
Others	Others (three candidates)	980	0.97	
Turnout		118,460	60.67	
Total valid votes		113,412	95.74	
Rejected ballots		5,048	4.26	
Majority		10,544	9.30	
Registered electors		195,255		
hold				

== General elections 2008 ==
Provincial election 2008: PP-19 Attock-V
Party	Candidate	Votes	%	±%
PML(Q)	Malik Itbar Khan	41,003	43.63	
PML(N)	Sardar Mumtaz Khan	34,557	36.77	
PPP	Sardar Muhammad Ameer Khan Advocate	17,834	18.98	
Independent	Sadia Ahmed	311	0.33	
MMA	Syed Abdul Salam Hassan Raza Naqvi	185	0.20	
Independent	Malik Muhammad Ramzan	95	0.10	
Turnout		97,014	57.70	
Total valid votes		93,985	96.88	
Rejected ballots		3,029	3.12	
Majority		6,446	6.86	
Registered electors		168,131		

== See also ==
- PP-4 Attock-IV
- PP-6 Murree
