= NA-59 (Attock-III) =

Former constituency of the National Assembly of Pakistan

- Former constituency for the National Assembly of Pakistan
- Region: Attock District

Former constituency
- Abolished: 2018
- Replaced by: NA-55 (Attock-I); NA-56 (Attock-II)

NA-59 (Attock-III) (Urdu: این اے-۵۹، اٹک-۳) was a constituency for the National Assembly of Pakistan from 2002 to 2018. In the 2018 delimitations its areas were divided between the new constituencies of NA-55 (Attock-I) and NA-56 (Attock-II).

== Members of Parliament ==
=== 1977: NA-43 (Campbellpur-III) ===
Election	Member	Party
1977	Pir Syed Shafi-ud-Din	PPP

=== 1985: NA-43 (Attock-III) ===
Election	Member	Party
1985	Malik Nur Khan	Independent

=== Since 2002: NA-59 (Attock-III) ===
Election	Member	Party
2002	Eman Waseem	PML-Q
2004 by-election	Shaukat Aziz	PML-Q
2008	Sardar Salim Haider Khan	PPPP
2013	Muhammad Zain Elahi	Independent

== Election 2002 ==
General elections were held on 10 Oct 2002. Eman Wasim of PML-Q won by 65,672 votes.

General election 2002: NA-59 Attock-III
Party	Candidate	Votes	%	±%
PML(Q)	Eman Wasim	65,672	50.43	
PPP	Dr. Sikandar Hayat Khan	41,674	32.00	
PML(N)	Muhammad Pervez Khan	12,884	9.89	
MMA	Muhammad Halim	6,908	5.31	
PAT	Dr. Muhammad Yaqoob Khan	3,079	2.37	
Turnout		133,618	56.55	
Total valid votes		130,217	97.46	
Rejected ballots		3,401	2.54	
Majority		23,998	18.43	
Registered electors		236,272		

== Election 2008 ==
The result of general election 2008 in this constituency is given below.

=== Result ===
Sardar Salim Haider Khan succeeded in the election 2008 and became the member of National Assembly.

General election 2008: NA-59 Attock-III
Party	Candidate	Votes	%	±%
PPP	Sardar Saleem Haider Khan	71,400	45.70	
PML(Q)	Waseem Gulzar	58,880	37.69	
PML(N)	Asif Ali Malik	23,640	15.13	
Independent	Iftikhar Ahmad Khan	2,308	1.48	
Turnout		160,378	60.78	
Total valid votes		156,228	97.41	
Rejected ballots		4,150	2.59	
Majority		12,520	8.01	
Registered electors		263,849		

== Election 2013 ==
General elections were held on 11 May 2013. Muhammad Zain Elahi an independent candidate won by 60,284 votes and became the member of National Assembly.

General election 2013: NA-59 Attock-III
Party	Candidate	Votes	%	±%
Independent	Muhammad Zain Ellahi	60,850	31.53	
PML(N)	Asif Ali Malik	60,161	31.18	
PTI	Sardar Muhammad Ali Khan	33,916	17.58	
PPP	Sardar Saleem Haider Khan	31,831	16.50	
Independent	Malik Aurangzeb Awan	3,213	1.67	
Others	Others (three candidates)	3,005	1.54	
Turnout		200,074	64.68	
Total valid votes		192,976	96.45	
Rejected ballots		7,098	3.55	
Majority		689	0.35	
Registered electors		309,334		
