= Shaukat Hayat Khan =

Pakistani politician and military officer (1915-1998)

Major Shaukat-i-Punjab Shaukat Hayat Khan
- شوکت حیات خان
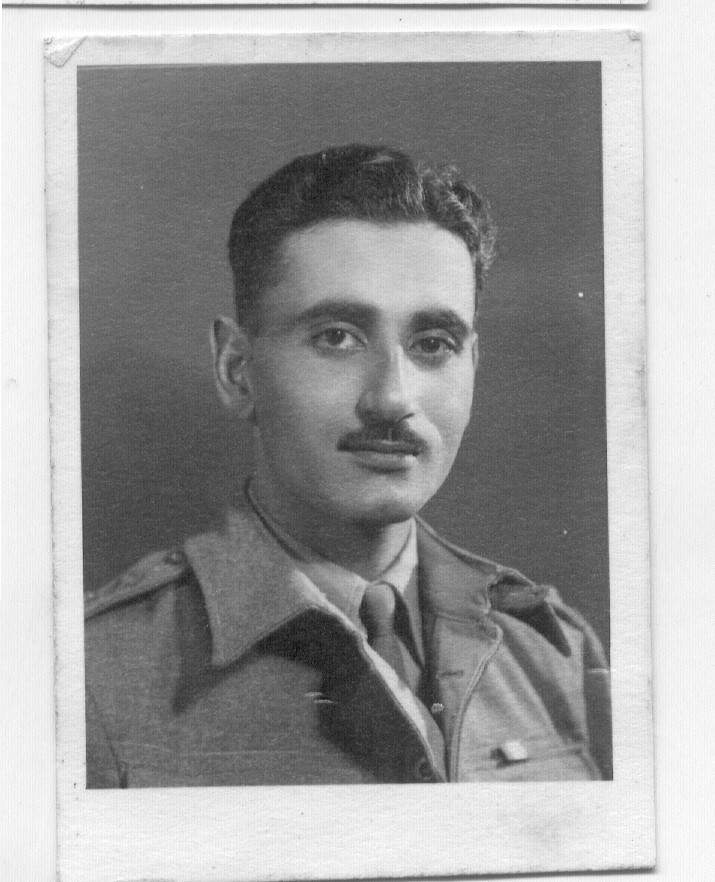
- Khan, c. 1942

Member of the National Assembly of Pakistan
- In office 26 March 1977 – 5 July 1977
- Constituency: NA-42 (Campbellpur-II)
- In office 14 April 1972 – 10 January 1977
- Constituency: NW-30 (Campbellpur-I)

Member of the Constituent Assembly of Pakistan
- In office 10 August 1947 – 24 October 1954
- Constituency: Campbellpur District

Personal details
- Born: 24 September 1915 Amritsar, British Punjab
- Died: 25 September 1998 (aged 83) Islamabad, Pakistan
- Spouse: Begum Mussarat Mahmood Shaukat Hyat Khan (wife)
- Children: 6
- Parent: Sikandar Hayat Khan (father)
- Education: Aitchison College; Aligarh Muslim University; Indian Military Academy; British Middle East Staff College, Mandatory Palestine
- Nickname(s): SHK; Shark

Military service
- Branch/service: British Indian Army
- Years of service: 1937–1942
- Rank: Major
- Unit: 16th Light Cavalry; 1st Duke of York's Own Skinner's Horse
- Battles/wars: World War II; Mediterranean and Middle East theatre

Shaukat Hayat Khan (Note: Punjabi, Urdu: شوكت حيات خان) (24 September 1915 – 25 September 1998) was an influential politician, military officer, and Pakistan Movement activist who played a major role in the organising of the Muslim League in the British-controlled Punjab.

Educated at the Aligarh Muslim University and served in the British Indian Army in the Middle East theatre of the Second World War, he actively participated in the politics through the Muslim League platform. After a brief retirement, he made his comeback in politics during the general elections held in 1970 and was an instrumental negotiator in trying to settle the political issues with the Awami League.

== Background ==
Shaukat Hayat Khan was born in Amritsar, on 24 September 1915. His family hailed from the famous Hayat Khattar clan of Wah in Attock, and he was the eldest son of Sir Sikandar Hayat Khan, a notable Punjabi statesman and feudal baron, from his first wife Begum Zubaida Khanum, a lady from a prominent Kashmiri family settled in Amritsar, British India.

After his mother's early demise in 1919, the young Shaukat and his siblings were taken care of by their aunt and in due course, he was sent to study at the Aitchison College and the Aligarh Muslim University, briefly, before he was sent, in keeping with family tradition, to join the British Indian Army, upon passing the qualifying examinations.

== Early military career ==
Upon completing his military training or cadetship at the Indian Military Academy, he was formally commissioned as a Second Lieutenant on the Special List with effect from 15 July 1937. He was then attached to the 1st battalion Northamptonshire Regiment for a year then in August 1938 joined the 16th Light Cavalry. After some service on the North West Frontier, when the Second World War broke out, he volunteered to go abroad for active service with any cavalry regiment being sent out to the Front, and was therefore seconded to Skinner's Horse. He thereafter served in Somalia, the Middle East and North Africa from 1940 to 1942, first promoted Captain April - July 1941, after that as a temporary Major until after his father's death in December 1942, when he quit military service to take up his political role in the Punjab. Upon taking his release he was regularized with the rank of major. He stayed in London for a short period during 1943.

== Early political career ==
On taking up his late father's political mantle, he was duly elected to the Punjab Assembly and made a member of the cabinet under the new Punjab premier, Malik Khizar Hayat Tiwana, and subsequently served as Minister for Public Works in the Unionist Muslim League government. Dismissed in 1944 for his increasingly pro-Muslim League and pro-Jinnah ideals and policies, he was subsequently elected Deputy Leader of the Punjab League. Re-elected to the Punjab Assembly in 1946, he became one of the most prominent activists in the Muslim League's "Direct Action" campaign through its paramilitary wing the Muslim National Guard and the most famous and popular of the League's young leadership, winning the title of "Shaukat-i-Punjab" (Shaukat of the Punjab) from Jinnah himself. He played a significant role in eventually winning over the Punjabi Muslims in large numbers, to the cause of the League and of an independent Pakistan.

== Later career ==
After partition he left the Muslim League party amidst conflicts with Mian Mumtaz Daultana and briefly joined the Pakistan Azad Party along with Mian Iftikharuddin. Between the 1950s and 1970s, in his own words, he was 'an unlucky witness to the gradual destruction of the Quaid's (i.e. Jinnahs) Pakistan', at the hands of greedy and corrupt politicians and the martial law regimes.

Elected again from Attock in the 1970 general elections, he played a key role in the opposition negotiations with Zulfikar Bhutto which led to the passage of Pakistan's first interim constitution. He was also one of the few Pakistani statesmen in 1970–71, who tried to negotiate amicably with the Awami League, to try to salvage former East Pakistan, which seceded and became Bangladesh soon afterwards. Disillusioned, Khan soon afterwards resigned permanently from political life.

He died in Islamabad on 25 September 1998 and is survived by two sons and four daughters. His son Sikander Hayat Junior has twice fought provincial elections from the PPP.

== Authorship ==
He wrote his memoirs entitled The Nation That Lost Its Soul: Memoirs of a Freedom Fighter (Lahore: Jang, 1995), its Urdu version being called Gumgashtah Qaum : Ek Mujāhid-i Āzādī Kī Yād Dāshten̲.

== See also ==
- Muhammad Hayat Khan
- Muhammad Ali Jinnah
- Pakistan Movement
- All India Muslim League
- Malik Khizar Hayat Tiwana
- Skinner's Horse
