= Tahir Sadiq =

Pakistani politician

Member of the National Assembly of Pakistan
- In office 13 August 2018 – 25 January 2023
- Constituency: NA-55 (Attock-I)

Personal details
- Party: PTI (2017-present)
- Other political affiliations: PMLN (1997); IND (2013)
- Children: Muhammad Zain Elahi (son); Eman Waseem (daughter)
- Relatives: Parvez Elahi (brother-in-law), Chaudhry family

Tahir Sadiq Khan is a Pakistani politician who has been a member of the National Assembly of Pakistan from August 2018 till January 2023.

== Early life ==
Khan was born into a Punjabi family of the Khattar clan and is married to the sister of Chaudhry Pervaiz Elahi.

He completed graduation from Pakistan Military Academy, Kakul in 1971. After retiring from the Pakistan Army with the rank of major, he joined Punjab civil service where he served for seven years.

== Political career ==
He was elected to the Provincial Assembly of the Punjab as a candidate of Pakistan Muslim League (N) (PML-N) from Constituency PP-12 (Attock-I) in the 1997 Pakistani general election. He received 36,051 votes and defeated Muhammad Shawez Khan.

In 2017, he joined Pakistan Tehreek-e-Insaf (PTI).

He was elected to the National Assembly of Pakistan as a candidate of PTI from Constituency NA-55 (Attock-I) and from Constituency NA-56 (Attock-II) in the 2018 Pakistani general election. He received 145,168 votes from Constituency NA-55 (Attock-I) and defeated Sheikh Aftab Ahmed and received 163,325 votes from Constituency NA-56 (Attock-II) and defeated Malik Sohail Khan, a candidate of Pakistan Muslim League (N) (PML-N). In the same election, he was also re-elected to the Provincial Assembly of the Punjab as a candidate of PTI from Constituency PP-3 (Attock-III). He received 62,337 votes and defeated Asif Ali Malik.

Following his election, he decided to retain his National Assembly seat NA-55 (Attock-I) and abandon his national assembly seat NA-56 (Attock-II) and Punjab assembly seat PP-3 (Attock-III).
