= Tamman =

Coordinates: 33°40′38″N 72°51′21″E

- tehsil
- Interactive map of Tamman
- Country: Pakistan
- Province: Punjab
- District: Talagang

Population
  - Total: 18,956
- Time zone: PST
- Postal code: 48040
- Website: https://www.tamman.pk/

Tamman is a village and union council of Talagang District, Punjab Province, Pakistan. It is located about 30 km from Talagang city. Tamman is famous for Awan Tribe. Notable people from Tamman include the politicians Sardar Muhammad Hayat Khan Tamman, Sardar Mumtaz Khan, Sardar Dr. Maqsood Hayat Tamman, Sardar Mansoor Hayat, and Pakistan Air Force chief Sardar Nur Khan.
