= NA-49 Attock-I =

Constituency of the National Assembly of Pakistan

- Constituency for the National Assembly of Pakistan
- Region: Hazro Tehsil, Attock Tehsil and Hasan Abdal Tehsil (partly) of Attock District
- Electorate: 640,889

Current constituency
- Party: Pakistan Muslim League (N)
- Member: Sheikh Aftab Ahmed
- Created from: NA-57 Attock-I; NA-59 (Attock-III)

NA-49 Attock-I (این اے-49، اٹک-۱) is a constituency for the National Assembly of Pakistan.

== Members of Parliament ==
=== 1970–1977: NW-30 Campbellpur-I ===
Election	Member	Party
1970	Sardar Shaukat Hayat Khan	ML(C)

=== 1977: NA-41 Campbellpur-I ===
Election	Member	Party
1977	Ahmed Waheed Akhter	PPP

=== 1985–2002: NA-41 Attock-I ===
Election	Member	Party
1985	Malik Muhammad Aslam Khan	Independent
1988	Malik Muhammad Aslam Khan	PPP
1990	Sheikh Aftab Ahmed	IJI
1993	Sheikh Aftab Ahmed	PML-N
1997	Sheikh Aftab Ahmed	PML-N

=== 2002–2018: NA-57 Attock-I ===
Election	Member	Party
2002	Malik Amin Aslam Khan	PML-Q
2008	Sheikh Aftab Ahmed	PML-N
2013	Sheikh Aftab Ahmed	PML-N

=== 2018–2023: NA-55 Attock-I ===
Election	Member	Party
2018	Tahir Sadiq	PTI

=== 2024–present: NA-49 Attock-I ===
Election	Member	Party
2024	Sheikh Aftab Ahmed	PML-N

== Detailed Results ==
=== Election 2002 ===
General elections were held on 10 October 2002. Malik Amin Aslam of PML-Q won by 39,921 votes.

General election 2002: NA-57 Attock-I
Party	Candidate	Votes	%	±%
PML(Q)	Malik Amin Aslam Khan	39,921	38.98	
PML(N)	Mohammad Salman Sarwar	23,988	23.42	
MMA	Saeed Ahmad	23,933	23.37	
PPP	Sheikhehsan-Ud-Din	9,570	9.35	
Others	Others (three candidates)	4,998	4.88	
Turnout		106,183	43.64	
Total valid votes		102,410	96.45	
Rejected ballots		3,773	3.55	
Majority		15,933	15.56	
Registered electors		243,306		

=== Election 2008 ===
The result of general election 2008 in this constituency is given below.

Sheikh Aftab Ahmed succeeded in the election 2008 and became the member of National Assembly.

General election 2008: NA-57 Attock-I
Party	Candidate	Votes	%	±%
PML(N)	Sheikh Aftab Ahmed	38,755	30.39	
Independent	Malik Amin Aslam	38,392	30.10	
Independent	Eman Wasim	33,975	26.64	
PPP	Syed Azmat Ali Bukhari	13,554	10.63	
Others	Others (four candidates)	2,857	2.24	
Turnout		134,543	48.84	
Total valid votes		127,533	94.79	
Rejected ballots		7,010	5.21	
Majority		363	0.29	
Registered electors		275,468		
PML(N) gain from PML(Q)				

=== Election 2013 ===
General elections were held on 11 May 2013. Sheikh Aftab Ahmed of PML-N won by 59,920 votes and became the member of National Assembly.

General election 2013: NA-57 Attock-I
Party	Candidate	Votes	%	±%
PML(N)	Sheikh Aftab Ahmed	59,920	32.90	
PTI	Malik Amin Aslam	56,007	30.75	
Independent	Tahir Sadiq	51,439	28.24	
Others	Others (eight candidates)	14,759	8.11	
Turnout		187,589	53.03	
Total valid votes		182,125	97.09	
Rejected ballots		5,464	2.91	
Majority		3,913	2.15	
Registered electors		353,751		
PML(N) hold				

=== Election 2018 ===
General elections were held on 25 July 2018.

General election 2018: NA-55 Attock-I
Party	Candidate	Votes	%	±%
PTI	Tahir Sadiq	145,168	47.48	
PML(N)	Sheikh Aftab Ahmed	101,773	33.29	
TLP	Muhammad Hafeezullah Jan	25,429	8.32	
MMA	Saeed Ahmed	11,748	3.84	
PPP	Sardar Zulfiqar Hayat Khan	10,936	3.58	
Others	Others (three candidates)	2,357	0.77	
Turnout		305,727	53.47	
Rejected ballots		8,316	2.72	
Majority		43,395	14.19	
Registered electors		571,804		
PTI gain from PML(N)				

=== Election 2024 ===
General elections were held on 8 February 2024. Sheikh Aftab Ahmed won the election with 120,158 votes.

General election 2024: NA-49 Attock-I
Party	Candidate	Votes	%	±%
PML(N)	Sheikh Aftab Ahmed	120,158	37.80	▲4.51
PTI	Tahir Sadiq (Note: Filed nomination papers as PTI candidate but ECP allowed him to run as an Independent)	110,462	34.75	▼12.73
TLP	Hafiz Muhammad Hamid	36,444	11.47	▲3.15
Independent	Malik Amin Aslam	19,184	6.04	N/A
JI	Iqbal Khan	15,576	4.90	N/A
Others	Others (seven candidates)	16,014	5.04	
Turnout		323,039	50.40	▼3.07
Total valid votes		317,838	98.39	
Rejected ballots		5,201	1.61	
Majority		9,696	3.05	
Registered electors		640,889		
PML(N) gain from PTI				

== See also ==
- NA-48 Islamabad-III
- NA-50 Attock-II
