= Khunda, Punjab =

Khunda
- Village
- Location within Pakistan
- Coordinates: 33°25′4″N 72°44′16″E
- Country: Pakistan
- Province: Punjab
- District: Attock
- Tehsil: Jand
- Time zone: UTC+5 (PST)

Khunda is a village in Jand Tehsil of Attock District in Punjab Province of Pakistan. It is located 70 km north of Islamabad, the country's capital.

== Notable persons ==
- Malik Allahyar Khan (1927-2008), politician
