= Muhammad Zain Elahi =

Pakistani politician

- محمد زین الٰہی

Member of the National Assembly of Pakistan
- In office 1 June 2013 – 31 May 2018
- Preceded by: Sardar Saleem Haider Khan
- Constituency: NA-59 (Attock)

Personal details
- Born: 15 April 1987 (age 39)
- Party: PTI (2018-present)
- Other political affiliations: PMLN (2013-2018)
- Parent: Tahir Sadiq Khan (father)
- Relatives: Eman Waseem (sister); Shujaat Hussain (uncle), Chaudhry family

Muhammad Zain Elahi (Urdu: محمد زین الہی; born 15 April 1987) is a Pakistani politician who had been a member of the National Assembly of Pakistan from June 2013 to May 2018.

== Early life and education ==
He was born on 15 April 1987 to Tahir Sadiq Khan.

Elahi received his education in global management from United Kingdom.

Elahi is the nephew of Chaudhry Shujaat Hussain.

== Political career ==
Elahi was elected to the National Assembly of Pakistan from Constituency NA-59 (Attock-III) as an independent candidate in the 2013 Pakistani general election. He received 60,850 votes and defeated a candidate of Pakistan Muslim League (N) (PML-N).

Elahi became youngest parliamentarian to be elected in the 2013 general election at the age of 26.
