= Malik Allahyar Khan =

Pakistani politician

- ملک اللہ یار خان
- Born: 2 June 1927; Khunda, Attock, Punjab, British Indian Empire
- Died: 5 April 2008 (aged 80); Rawalpindi, Pakistan
- Citizenship: Pakistani (post-1947)
- Occupations: Lawyer, politician, landowner, agriculturalist and philanthropist
- Children: Malik Shehryar Khan(son); Malik Ihtebar Khan (son)

Malik Allahyar Khan (2 June 1927–5 April 2008, Urdu: ملک اللہ یار خان) was a parliamentarian from Pakistan.

== Early life ==
He was born on 2 June 1927 in Khunda, a small village in Attock District. His father, Malik Khaki Jan, was a landlord of the area given the title of Khan Bahadur by the British government. His mother, Bibi Beherawar Sultan, was the daughter of a Muslim Barrister from N.W.F.P Mufti Fida Muhammad Khan. He had five siblings, four brothers and a sister.

== Education ==
He was educated at Gordon College, Rawalpindi and Zamindar College, Gujrat. He has the distinction of being the champion in an all Pakistan debating championship. While in college, he became interested in politics and was a senior member of the Muslim Students Federation. He held long marches against the Cripps' mission and was imprisoned for a period of six months. He did his LLB from Law College, Lahore. He was married on 28 January 1950 to Bibi Miluk Bano, daughter of Sardar Dost Muhammad Khan. After completing his studies he set up his practice in Campbellpur (present day Attock).

== Politics ==
Malik Allahyar Khan entered politics in 1956 when he contested and won the district council election. He participated in various youth conferences around the world.

He became the Minister for railways and Jail in 1964 representing West Pakistan, a post which he held until 1969. The 1970s were a difficult period as the government of Zulfiqar Ali Bhutto did not favour those who were major landowners.

The 1980s heralded a new beginning as Malik Allahyar was nominated for the post of Punjab Chief Minister which was however given to Mian Nawaz Sharif on the insistence of the than Governor Punjab, Gen. (Rtd) Ghulam Jillani. He was than given the post of the provincial Minister for Social Security. His aim was the welfare of the masses and thus he set up the department of Social Security to provide relief to the downtrodden.

In his later years he contested the National Assembly elections in 1987, 1993, 2002 winning in 1993 and 2002. He ran for the post of District Nazim Attock which he lost by only two votes. Late he contested the National Assembly elections which he won with a landslide victory.

His past led him towards being nominated for the prestigious post of the chairman, Public Accounts Committee. He spoke against the sugar scandal and other issues that the then-current government was having.

Malik Allahyar was successful in formulating the Khunda group which has thrived in the district for more than seven decades. After his death, Malik Allahyar's son Malik Aitbar khan represented the group in the 2008 and 2013 elections.

In the upcoming 2018 elections, Malik Allahyar's older son Malik Shehryar khan is contesting as an independent candidate from NA-56 Attock II. He is a highly qualified (BSc civil engineering, NED University Karachi and MSc civil engineering, City University London) retired senior bureaucrat.

== Death ==
He was diagnosed with cancer in 2007. He died on 5 April 2008 at the age of 81 at Fauji Foundation Hospital, Rawalpindi and buried in his native graveyard of Khunda village near Fatehjang District Attock. Nowadays his son Malik Aitbar Khan is an elected Member of Pakistan's National Assembly.
