= Malik Aitbar Khan =

Pakistani politician (born 1953)

- ملک اعتبارخان

Member of the National Assembly of Pakistan
- In office 1 June 2013 – 31 May 2018
- Constituency: NA-58 (Attock)

Member of the Provincial Assembly of the Punjab
- Incumbent
- Assumed office 24 February 2024
- Constituency: PP-5 (Attock-V)
- In office 2008–2013
- Constituency: PP-19 (Attock-V)

Personal details
- Born: 1 September 1953 (age 73)
- Party: PMLN (2008-present)

Malik Aitbar Khan (Urdu: ملک اعتبار خان; born 1 September 1953) is a Pakistani politician who is Member of Punjab Assembly since March 2024. Previously he had been a member of the National Assembly of Pakistan, from June 2013 to May 2018. Previously, he had been a member of the Provincial Assembly of the Punjab from 2008 to 2013.

== Early life and education ==
He was born on 1 September 1953 in Rawalpindi.

He received early education from St. Anthony High School, Lahore and St. Mary's School, Rawalpindi. He graduated from Forman Christian College and earned a Bachelor of Arts degree.

== Political career ==
Khan was elected to the Provincial Assembly of the Punjab as a candidate of Pakistan Muslim League (Q) (PML-Q) from Constituency PP-19 (Attock-V) in the 2008 Pakistani general election. He received 41,003 votes and defeated a candidate of Pakistan Muslim League (N) (PML-N).

He was elected to the National Assembly of Pakistan as a candidate of PML-N from Constituency NA-58 (Attock-II) in the 2013 Pakistani general election. He received 85,244 votes and defeated a candidate of Pakistan Tehreek-e-Insaf.
