= Sheikh Aftab Ahmed =

Pakistani politician

- شیخ آفتاب احمد

Minister for Parliamentary Affairs
- In office 4 August 2017 – 31 May 2018
- President: Mamnoon Hussain
- Prime Minister: Shahid Khaqan Abbasi
- In office 21 May 2016 – 28 July 2017
- President: Mamnoon Hussain
- Prime Minister: Nawaz Sharif

Minister of State for Parliamentary Affairs
- In office 7 June 2013 – 21 May 2016
- President: Mamnoon Hussain
- Prime Minister: Nawaz Sharif

Member of the National Assembly of Pakistan
- Incumbent
- Assumed office 29 February 2024
- Constituency: NA-57 Attock-I
- In office 1 June 2013 – 31 May 2018
- Constituency: NA-57 Attock-I
- In office 17 March 2008 – 16 March 2013
- Constituency: NA-57 Attock-I
- In office 17 February 1997 – 12 October 1999
- Constituency: NA-41 Attock-I
- In office 19 October 1993 – 5 November 1996
- Constituency: NA-41 Attock-I
- In office 6 November 1990 – 18 July 1993
- Constituency: NA-41 Attock-I

Personal details
- Born: October 25, 1944 (age 82) Attock, Punjab, British India
- Party: PMLN (1992-present)
- Other political affiliations: IJI (1988-1992)
- Relatives: Chaudhry Muhammed Farooq (son in law)

Sheikh Aftab Ahmed (Punjabi, Urdu: شیخ آفتاب احمد; born 25 October 1944) is a Pakistani politician who is currently serving as a member of the National Assembly of Pakistan since February 2024. He previously served as Minister for Parliamentary Affairs, in Abbasi cabinet from August 2017 to May 2018. A leader of the Pakistan Muslim League (N) (PML-N), Ahmed had been a Member of the National Assembly of Pakistan between 1990 and May 2018. He previously served in Sharif cabinet, first as Minister of State for Parliamentary Affairs from 2013 to 2016 and then as Minister for Parliamentary Affair from 2016 until the dissolution of the cabinet in July 2017.

== Life and Political Career ==
He was born on 25 October 1944.

=== Family ===
His son In law Chaudhry Muhammed Farooq (Urdu: چودھری محمد فاروق; November 1959 – 29 December 2002) was a member of the Punjab Assembly from 1988 to 1997, and again in 2002. He was Minister for Law and Parliamentary Affairs during 1993–97, and the provincial president of PML.

==== Political career ====
Ahmed begun his politics career in 1980. He was elected as the member of the National Assembly of Pakistan for the first time in the 1990 Pakistani general election. He was re-elected as the member of the National Assembly of Pakistan for the second time in 1993 Pakistani general election. Ahmed was re-elected as the member of the National Assembly of Pakistan for the third time in 1997 Pakistani general election. In the 2002 Pakistani general election, he couldn't run for the seat of National Assembly due to not having graduation degree.

Ahmed was re-elected as the member of the National Assembly from NA-57 in the 2008 Pakistani general election for the fourth time. In 2011, he was served a notice by court over fake graduation degree.

Ahmed was re-elected as the member of the National Assembly in the 2013 Pakistani general election from na-57 on PML-N ticket for the fifth time. In June 2013, he was appointed as Minister of State for Parliamentary Affairs in the Cabinet of Prime Minister Nawaz Sharif. Later in May 2016, he was made Federal Minister for Parliamentary Affairs.

He had ceased to hold ministerial office in July 2017 when the federal cabinet was disbanded following the resignation of Prime Minister Nawaz Sharif after Panama Papers case decision. Following the election of Shahid Khaqan Abbasi as Prime Minister of Pakistan, Ahmed was inducted into the federal cabinet of Abbasi and was appointed Minister for Parliamentary Affairs for the second time. Upon the dissolution of the National Assembly on the expiration of its term on 31 May 2018, Ahmed ceased to hold the office as Federal Minister for Parliamentary Affairs.
