= Jati Umra =

Jati Umra may refer to:

- Jati Umra (Amritsar), a village in Punjab, India.
- Jati Umra (Lahore), a village in Punjab, Pakistan.
