= Shehbaz Sharif =

Prime Minister of Pakistan (2022–2023; 2024–present)

- شہباز شریف
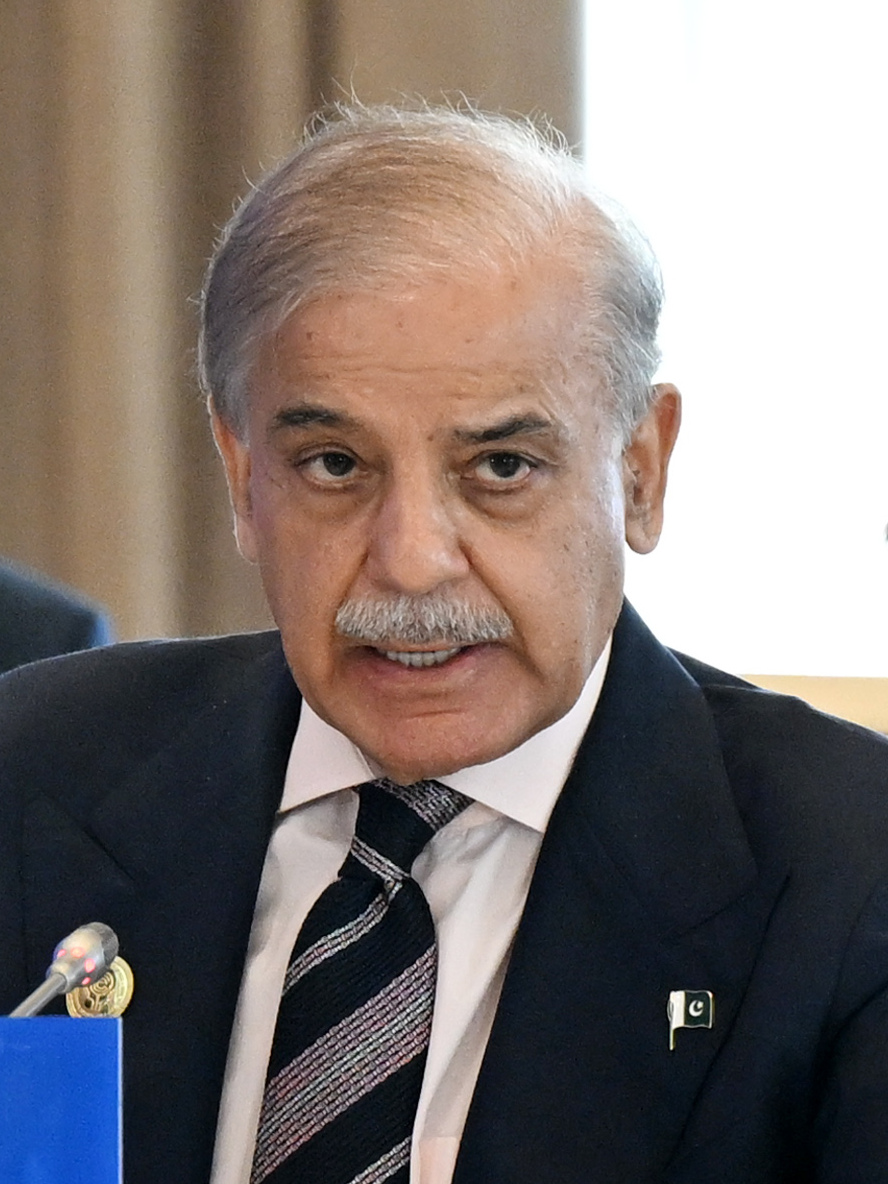
- Sharif in 2025

Prime Minister of Pakistan
- Incumbent
- Assumed office 4 March 2024
- President: Arif Alvi; Asif Ali Zardari
- Deputy: Ishaq Dar
- Preceded by: Anwaar ul Haq (caretaker)
- In office 11 April 2022 – 14 August 2023
- President: Arif Alvi
- Preceded by: Imran Khan
- Succeeded by: Anwaar ul Haq (caretaker)

Leader of the Opposition
- In office 20 August 2018 – 10 April 2022
- President: Mamnoon Hussain; Arif Alvi
- Prime Minister: Imran Khan
- Preceded by: Khurshid Shah
- Succeeded by: Raja Riaz

Member of the National Assembly
- Incumbent
- Assumed office 29 February 2024
- Preceded by: Himself (NA-132 (Lahore-X))
- Constituency: NA-123 (Lahore-VII)
- In office 13 August 2018 – 10 August 2023
- Preceded by: Constituency established
- Succeeded by: Himself (NA-123 (Lahore-VII))
- Constituency: NA-132 (Lahore-X)
- In office 3 November 1990 – 18 July 1993
- Preceded by: Jehangir Bader
- Succeeded by: Kamil Ali Agha
- Constituency: NA-96 (Lahore-V)

President of Pakistan Muslim League (N)
- In office 13 March 2018 – 13 May 2024
- Preceded by: Nawaz Sharif
- Succeeded by: Nawaz Sharif
- In office 2009–2011
- Preceded by: Chaudhary Nisar Ali Khan
- Succeeded by: Nawaz Sharif
Local offices
13th & 15th Chief Minister of Punjab
In office 7 June 2013 – 7 June 2018
Governor	Chaudhry Sarwar; Rafique Rajwana
Preceded by	Najam Sethi (caretaker)
Succeeded by	Hasan Askari Rizvi (caretaker)
In office 30 March 2009 – 26 March 2013
Governor	Makhdoom Ahmed Mehmood; Latif Khosa; Salmaan Taseer
Preceded by	Governor's rule
Succeeded by	Najam Sethi (caretaker)
In office 8 June 2008 – 25 February 2009
Governor	Salman Taseer
Preceded by	Dost Muhammad Khosa
Succeeded by	Governor's rule
In office 20 February 1997 – 12 October 1999
Governor	Khawaja Tariq Rahim; Shahid Hamid
Preceded by	Mian Muhammad Afzal Hayat (caretaker)
Succeeded by	Parvez Elahi
Leader of the Opposition of Punjab
In office 18 October 1993 – 17 November 1996
Preceded by	Rana Ikram Rabbani
Succeeded by	Saeed Ahmed Khan
Member of the Provincial Assembly of Punjab
In office 18 October 1993 – 31 May 2018
In office 30 November 1988 – 6 August 1990

Personal details
- Born: Muhammad Shehbaz Sharif; 23 September 1951 (age 75) Lahore, Punjab, Pakistan
- Party: PML(N) (1993–present)
- Other political affiliations: IJI (1988–1993)
- Spouses: Begum Nusrat (m. 1973) Aaliya Honey (m. 1993; div. 1994) Tehmina Durrani (m. 2003)
- Children: 4, including Hamza
- Parent: Muhammad Sharif (father)
- Relatives: Sharif family
- Education: Govt. College University (BA)
- Occupation: Politician; businessman

Mian Muhammad Shehbaz Sharif (Note: Urdu, Punjabi: میاں محمد شہباز شریف, pronounced [mɪˈãː mʊˈh̤əmːəd ʃɛhˈbaːz ʃəˈriːf]) (born 23 September 1951) is a Pakistani politician and businessman who has served as the prime minister of Pakistan since 2024, being the only person to hold it for two consecutive terms, having previously been in the role between 2022 and 2023. He has also served as the chief minister of Punjab three times, spanning over 12 years, making him the longest-serving person in the role, the leader of the opposition, and the president of the Pakistan Muslim League (N).

Sharif was elected to the Punjab Assembly in 1988 and later to the National Assembly in 1990, when his brother became head of the conservative Islami Jamhuri Ittihad (IJI). He was re-elected to the Punjab Assembly in 1993 and appointed leader of the opposition. He was elected as chief minister of Punjab, for the first time on 20 February 1997. After the 1999 Pakistani coup d'état, Sharif and his brother were arrested and exiled the next year to Saudi Arabia at the request of the Saudis, returning to Pakistan in 2007. Sharif was elected chief minister for a second term after the 2008 general election, and for a third consecutive term following the 2013 Punjab provincial election. His tenure as Chief Minister was marked by several controversies, most notably the 2014 Model Town massacre, rise in sexual abuse cases, police brutality and corruption in the province. At the same time, his tenure saw major infrastructure, transportation and energy development projects across Punjab than in any other province.

Sharif was made the president of the PML(N) after his brother, Nawaz Sharif, was disqualified from holding office in the wake of the Panama Papers case. He was nominated as the leader of the opposition after the 2018 general election and elected as prime minister in April 2022 after the no-confidence motion against Imran Khan was passed. After the PML(N) won a plurality in the controversial 2024 general election, which was widely marred by allegations of electoral rigging and irregularities in his party's favour, Sharif became prime minister with a coalition government.

During his tenure, Pakistan has faced high inflation and economic difficulties, with an estimated 48% of the population living below the poverty line, leading to greater reliance on petroleum levies, indirect taxation and financial assistance from the IMF. His administration has faced criticism over the economic burden on low-income households, corruption and weak accountability in the public sector, as well as increased privileges for parliamentarians. He has also faced criticism over the 2022 constitutional crisis and the use of excessive force by security personnel during protests, as well as changes to the constitutional and military command structures, lifetime privileges and legal protections for senior military officers, and extensions of military chiefs' tenures. Human rights organisations, including Human Rights Watch, have documented restrictions on freedom of expression, violence against journalists, human rights violations, the misuse of cybercrime laws and digital censorship during his premiership. Critics have also accused his government of weakening fundamental rights and state institutions, and of seeking greater influence over judicial and military appointments.

He has also faced domestic and international criticism over the Imprisonment of Imran Khan, and the resurgence of militancy in Khyber Pakhtunkhwa and Balochistan, while opposition groups have accused his government of benefiting from alleged electoral rigging, allegations that have been disputed by the government. These criticisms intensified following the imposition of governor's rule in Khyber Pakhtunkhwa, which ended the opposition-led provincial government, and the subsequent arrests of Sohail Afridi and members of his cabinet, without clear legal grounds and access to courts, to undisclosed locations, with their whereabouts remaining unknown.

On foreign policy, he received international praise for Pakistan's diplomatic role in efforts to mediate between Iran and the United States and for strengthening defence cooperation with other countries through the Mecca Defence Alliance.

His rule as prime minister has been described by critics as increasingly authoritarian, citing actions against political opposition, restrictions on freedom of expression, and weakening democratic accountability.

== Early life and education ==
Sharif was born on 23 September 1951 in Lahore, West Punjab. His family is Punjabi with Kashmiri ancestry. Sharif's father, Mian Muhammad Sharif, was an upper-middle-class businessman and industrialist whose family had emigrated from Anantnag in Kashmir for business, and eventually settled in the village of Jati Umra in Amritsar district, Punjab, at the beginning of the twentieth century. His mother's family came from Pulwama. Following the partition of India and Pakistan's independence in 1947, his parents migrated from Amritsar to Lahore. He has two brothers: Abbas Sharif and Nawaz Sharif. Nawaz is a three-time elected prime minister of Pakistan, serving the longest non-consecutive tenure in the role. Nawaz's wife, Begum Kulsoom Nawaz, was the first lady of Pakistan for three non-consecutive terms and his daughter, Maryam Nawaz is the current chief minister of Punjab.

Sharif attended St. Anthony High School, Lahore, and received a Bachelor of Arts degree from the Government College University, Lahore. After his graduation, he joined his family-owned Ittefaq Group. He was elected president of Lahore Chamber of Commerce & Industry in 1985.

== Early political career ==
Sharif began his political career after getting elected to the Punjab Assembly from Constituency PP-122 (Lahore-VII) as a candidate of the Islami Jamhoori Ittehad (IJI) in the 1988 general election. He had 22,372 votes and defeated a candidate of the Pakistan People's Party (PPP). However, his term prematurely ended in 1990 when the assemblies were dissolved.

He was re-elected to the Provincial Assembly of Punjab from Constituency PP-124 (Lahore-IX) as an IJI candidate in the 1990 general election. He received 26,408 votes and defeated a candidate of the Pakistan Democratic Alliance (PDA). In the same election, he was elected to the National Assembly of Pakistan from Constituency NA-96 (Lahore-V) as a candidate of IJI. He secured 54,506 votes and defeated Jehangir Bader. He vacated the Punjab Assembly seat to retain his National Assembly seat. His term prematurely ended in 1993 when the assemblies were dissolved.

In April 1993, the widow of Chief of Army Staff General Asif Nawaz Janjua, alleged that Brigadier Imtiaz Ahmed, head of the Intelligence Bureau, Nawaz Sharif, Shahbaz Sharif, and Chaudhary Nisar Ali Khan had planned to eliminate her husband.

He was re-elected to the Punjab Assembly from Constituency PP-125 (Lahore-X) as a candidate of the Pakistan Muslim League (N) (PML(N)), a new party founded by his brother, Nawaz, in the 1993 general election. He received 28,068 votes and defeated a candidate of PPP. In the same election, he was re-elected to the National Assembly from Constituency NA-96 (Lahore-V) as a candidate of the PML(N). He secured 55,867 votes and defeated Yousuf Salahuddin. He vacated the National Assembly seat and retained his Provincial Punjab Assembly seat. Shortly after the election, he was elected Leader of the Opposition in the Punjab Assembly. During his tenure as Leader of the Opposition, he travelled to the United Kingdom for medical treatment. In his absence, Chaudhry Pervaiz Elahi was made Acting Leader of the Opposition in the Punjab Assembly. His term as a member of the Punjab Assembly and Leader of the Opposition prematurely ended in November 1996 when the assemblies were dissolved.

== Chief Minister of Punjab (1997–1999) ==
Sharif was re-elected to the Punjab Assembly from Constituency PP-125 (Lahore-X) as a candidate of the PML(N) in the 1997 Punjab provincial election. He received 25,013 votes and defeated a candidate of PPP. In the same election, he was re-elected to the National Assembly from Constituency NA-96 (Lahore-V) as a candidate of PML(N). He secured 47,614 votes and defeated Hanif Ramay. He was elected as the Chief Minister of Punjab for the first time and was sworn in as 13th Chief Minister of Punjab on 20 February 1997.

Sharif focused on healthcare, education, agriculture and the promotion of industry in Punjab. He undertook several development projects in Lahore and launched a crackdown on criminals across the province to maintain law and order. Sharif introduced a series of educational reforms such as reformed exams in a variety of subjects, as well as self-finance schemes for students.

He held his office until 12 October 1999, when he was removed from the post of Chief Minister in the 1999 Pakistani coup d'état.

== Exile (1999-2007) ==
In 1999, a complainant, Saeeduddin, lodged a first information report and accused Sharif of allowing the Punjab Police, as chief minister, to kill his son along with other men in a fake encounter. In the encounter, his two sons and three other people were killed by the police. Following the coup Sharif was imprisoned. In December 2000, he, along with his immediate family members, struck a deal with Pervez Musharraf negotiated by the Saudi royal family and went into exile in Saudi Arabia.

While in exile in Saudi Arabia, Sharif was elected as the PML(N) President in August 2002 and moved to the United Kingdom in 2003 for medical treatment.

In 2003, an anti-terrorism court summoned Sharif and five others accused in alleged extrajudicial killings in 1998. He was in the exile at that time and failed to show-up to the court. Later, the court issued an arrest warrant for Sharif. In 2004, Sharif attempted to return to Pakistan to appear before the court, but was forcibly deported back to Saudi Arabia.

In August 2007, the Supreme Court of Pakistan gave its verdict which allowed the Sharif and Nawaz Sharif to return to Pakistan. In September 2007, an anti-terrorism court in Pakistan ordered police to arrest Sharif based on a 2003 arrest warrant. He later received bail from an anti-terrorism court. Sharif denied ordering the alleged killings and said the charges against him were politically motivated. He further added that in 2004, he had landed at Lahore Airport, wanting to appear before the court, but was sent back to Saudi Arabia by the government in violation of the orders of the Supreme Court. In 2008, he was acquitted by the Anti-Terrorism Court in the Sabzazar case.

Sharif was re-elected as PML(N) President for a second term in August 2006 and returned to Pakistan along with Nawaz Sharif in November 2007.

Sharif was ineligible to take part in the 2008 general election due to the Sabzazar case, but a few months later he was acquitted by the court.

== Chief Minister of Punjab (2008–2018) ==
Sharif was re-elected to the Punjab Assembly unopposed from Constituency PP-48 (Bhakkar-II) as a PML(N) candidate in the by-election held in June 2008. Subsequently, he was elected unopposed as the Chief Minister of Punjab, receiving 265 votes unopposed after securing 265 votes. Later, in June 2008, while holding the Assembly seat from Constituency PP-48 (Bhakkar-II), Sharif contested for a seat in the Punjab Assembly from Constituency PP-10 (Rawalpindi-X). He was elected unopposed but resigned from this seat due to a dispute regarding his eligibility to serve as chief minister.

His second term as chief minister was interrupted on 25 February 2009 when the Supreme Court of Pakistan declared him ineligible to hold public office, resulting in the vacancy of his seat in the Punjab Assembly and his removal from the office of chief minister. On 1 April 2009, a five-member larger bench of the Supreme Court overturned the earlier decision, reinstating Sharif as chief minister.

In the 2013 general election, Sharif was re-elected to the Punjab Assembly from three Constituencies PP-159 (Lahore-XXIII), PP-161 (Lahore-XXV) and PP-247 (Rajanpur-I), as a PML(N) candidate. In the same election, he was re-elected to the National Assembly from Constituency NA-129 (Lahore-XII). Sharif chose to retain his Provincial Assembly seat PP-159 (Lahore-XXIII) and was re-elected as chief minister of Punjab for the third time, receiving 300 votes in the 371-member Provincial Assembly.

In August 2014, a dissenting note by members of a joint investigation team, composed of representatives of the Inter-Services Intelligence (ISI), Military Intelligence (MI), Intelligence Bureau (IB), and other branches, stated that Chief Minister Shehbaz, Law Minister Rana Sanaullah, Dr Tauqeer Shah, and other senior police officers were directly or indirectly responsible for the killing of over a dozen Pakistan Awami Tehreek (PAT) workers in the Model Town Massacre. Similarly, a sessions court in Lahore ordered police to register murder charges against 21 individuals, including Prime Minister Nawaz Sharif and Shahbaz Sharif for the massacre.

=== Intra-party politics ===
In 2016, Sharif was elected unopposed as the president of the PML(N)'s Punjab chapter in intra-party elections.

On 29 July 2017, following the disqualification of outgoing Prime Minister Nawaz Sharif after the Panama Papers case decision, Sharif was named leader of the PML(N) and their candidate for the office of prime minister. However, he was not a member of the National Assembly, so Petroleum Minister Shahid Khaqan Abbasi was asked to serve as the interim prime minister of Pakistan, allowing Sharif enough time to enter the legislature through a by-election. Later, Sharif decided to complete his tenure as chief minister until the next general election.

In December 2017, Sharif was named as the candidate of PML(N) for the office of prime minister in the 2018 general election.

In February 2018, Sharif was appointed the interim president of the PML(N). In March 2018, he was elected unopposed as the president of PML(N). It was reported that the establishment had previously offered Sharif the position of prime minister of Pakistan on several occasions, which he did not accept.

== Leader of the Opposition (2018–2022) ==
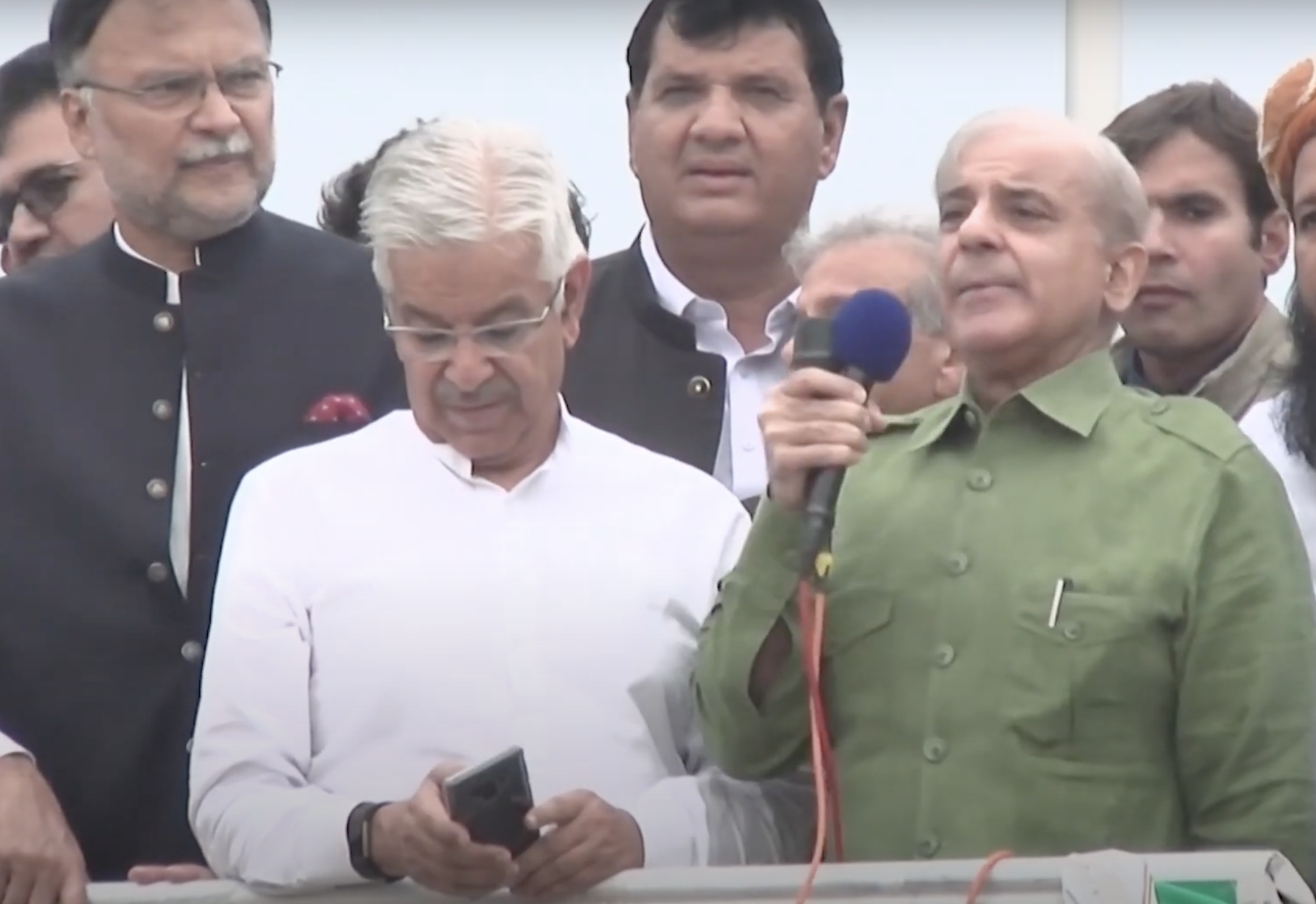
Sharif at an anti-Imran Khan government rally in Islamabad, November 2019

Sharif was elected to the National Assembly as a candidate of PML(N) from Constituency NA-132 (Lahore-X) in the 2018 Pakistani general election. In the same election, he was re-elected to the Provincial Assembly of Punjab as a candidate of PML(N) from Constituency PP-164 (Lahore-XXI) and PP-165 (Lahore-XXII). Following his successful election, he abandoned his Punjab seats in favour of the National assembly seat.

On 16 August 2018, he was nominated by PML(N) for the office of Prime Minister of Pakistan. The following day, he secured 96 votes, losing to Imran Khan. Later, he was nominated for the office of Leader of the Opposition in the National Assembly by 111 members of the National Assembly. On 20 August 2018, he was notified as Leader of the Opposition in the National Assembly. Concurrently, he served as Chairman of the Public Accounts Committee from 22 December 2018 until 28 November 2019, when he resigned and was succeeded by Rana Tanveer Hussain.

In September 2020, the National Accountability Bureau (NAB) arrested Sharif on charges of laundering Rs. 7,328 million (US$41 million) through a purported scheme involving close associates and family members. The NAB had previously frozen 23 properties owned by Sharif, his son, and other relatives, alleging these assets were acquired through unknown sources of income and that foreign funds were funnelled via fake transactions through a company owned by Sharif's son-in-law, Haroon Yousaf.

Following his arrest, Sharif was held in custody during the investigation. In November 2020, he was temporarily released on parole to attend his mother's funeral prayers. On 14 April 2021, he was granted bail by the Lahore High Court in the money laundering case.

== Prime Minister (2022–2023) ==
On 10 April 2022, Sharif was nominated as a candidate for prime minister by opposition parties following the no-confidence motion against Imran Khan after the 2022 Pakistani constitutional crisis. He was elected prime minister on 11 April 2022. He took the oath of office on the same day, administered by the Chairman of the Senate, Sadiq Sanjrani, acting for President Arif Alvi, who was on medical leave after complaining of "discomfort".

On 13 May 2022, it was reported that the Federal Investigation Agency (FIA) would not pursue the money laundering cases against Shehbaz and his son, Chief Minister of Punjab Hamza Shehbaz. These reports were based on a submission from FIA Special Prosecutor Sikandar Zulqarnain Saleem, who stated that the FIA's Director General, through the investigating officer, conveyed to Saleem that he should not continue to appear in this case because the defendants were about to be elected to the positions of Prime Minister and Chief Minister of Punjab. Additionally, Saleem wrote that "the quarters concerned are not interested in prosecuting the accused persons." Judge Ijaz Hassan Awan of the Special Court (Central-I) made this application part of the case file.

This came days after the death of Dr. Rizwan, the FIA director who had led the money-laundering investigation against Shehbaz and his son, and had been placed on the no-fly list by Shahbaz's government. The following month, Maqsood Chaprasi, another suspect in the case who was a peon for the Sharif family, also died from cardiac arrest in Dubai before the proceedings concluded. Earlier investigations in 2020 by the National Accountability Bureau (NAB) had also focused on Nisar Ahmed, who NAB described as a front man for the Sharif family, and Mushtaq Cheeni, had also revealed being involved in money laundering for the Sharif family.

On 12 October 2022, Prime Minister Sharif and his son were acquitted on all charges of corruption and money laundering by the Special Court Central in Lahore. After the verdict, Sharif's lawyer Amjad Pervez described the case as "totally baseless and politically motivated." Reacting to the verdict, former Prime Minister Imran Khan said that the acquittal covered up their theft worth billions and was a "slap in the nation's face by the judicial system".

=== Domestic policy ===
Sharif's main priority upon his ascension as prime minister in 2022 was to resolve the severe economic crisis that began that year, as rising fuel prices due to the Russian invasion of Ukraine, excessive borrowing, poor macroeconomic decision-making, a balance of payments crisis, among other factors had accumulated into a severe crisis that strained the nation's economy. Sharif also vowed to investigate Imran Khan's allegations of American intervention to instigate the latter's removal from power, vowing to step down if an "iota of evidence" was found against him. Sharif promised to enact electoral reforms to ensure that free and fair elections occurred.

==== Economic policy ====
Soon after Sharif's swearing-in ceremony, the government announced a relief package that included various measures such as raising the minimum wage from Rs. 21,000 to Rs. 25,000, subsidising wheat flour, a 10% raise in pensions, and a government employee salary reduction to less than Rs. 100,000 rupees. He also revived the Benazir Income Support Programme for poverty reduction, expanding it to educational aid.

In order to resolve skyrocketing fuel prices, Sharif sought to amplify energy production from power projects. He expressed his intentions to resolve the lack of profit from Pakistan's coal of reserves, suggesting that the Thar Engro Coal Power Project could be connected to other coal-powered plants and amplify production to up to 4,000 megawatts. Sharif further suggested that the Thar Project could revive the national economy and save the government up to $6 billion as the expenditure on energy imports rose to $24 billion.

Under Sharif's premiership, Pakistan's inflation rate skyrocketed to a multi-decade high of 27.3% in September 2022 and 37.97% in May 2023. In January 2023, 7 million textile workers became unemployed due to decreasing exports and the government's failure to end the economic crisis.

Despite negotiations with the International Monetary Fund (IMF) for a relief package for Pakistan's economy, the Pakistani rupee continued to depreciate under Sharif's tenure, with increasing inflation, unemployment, and low profits damaging business in Pakistan. The government's target of $7.7 billion for FY 2023 for foreign commercial loans also slumped, with only $0.2 billion gained from July to October 2022.

Sharif's government continued negotiations with the IMF for a relief package to mitigate the effects of the economic crisis, with a staff-level agreement reached in June 2023 for a $3 billion stand-by arrangement. In July 2023, the IMF's executive board approved the loan and begin a disbursement of roughly $1.2 billion. To secure the loan, Sharif's government instituted austerity measures in its annual budget, raising taxes by $750 million and hiking its interest rate to 22%, measures to curb inflation.

==== 2022 Pakistan floods ====
In 2022, Sindh and Balochistan received more rainfall than the August average, with 784% and 500% more, respectively. In addition to this rise in rainfall, southern Pakistan experienced back-to-back heat waves in May and June 2022, which were record-setting and made more likely by climate change. These conditions created a strong thermal low that brought heavier rains than usual. On 25 August 2022, Sharif's government declared a nationwide state of emergency due to the floods, which killed around 1,700 people and caused over roughly $30–40 billion in damage.

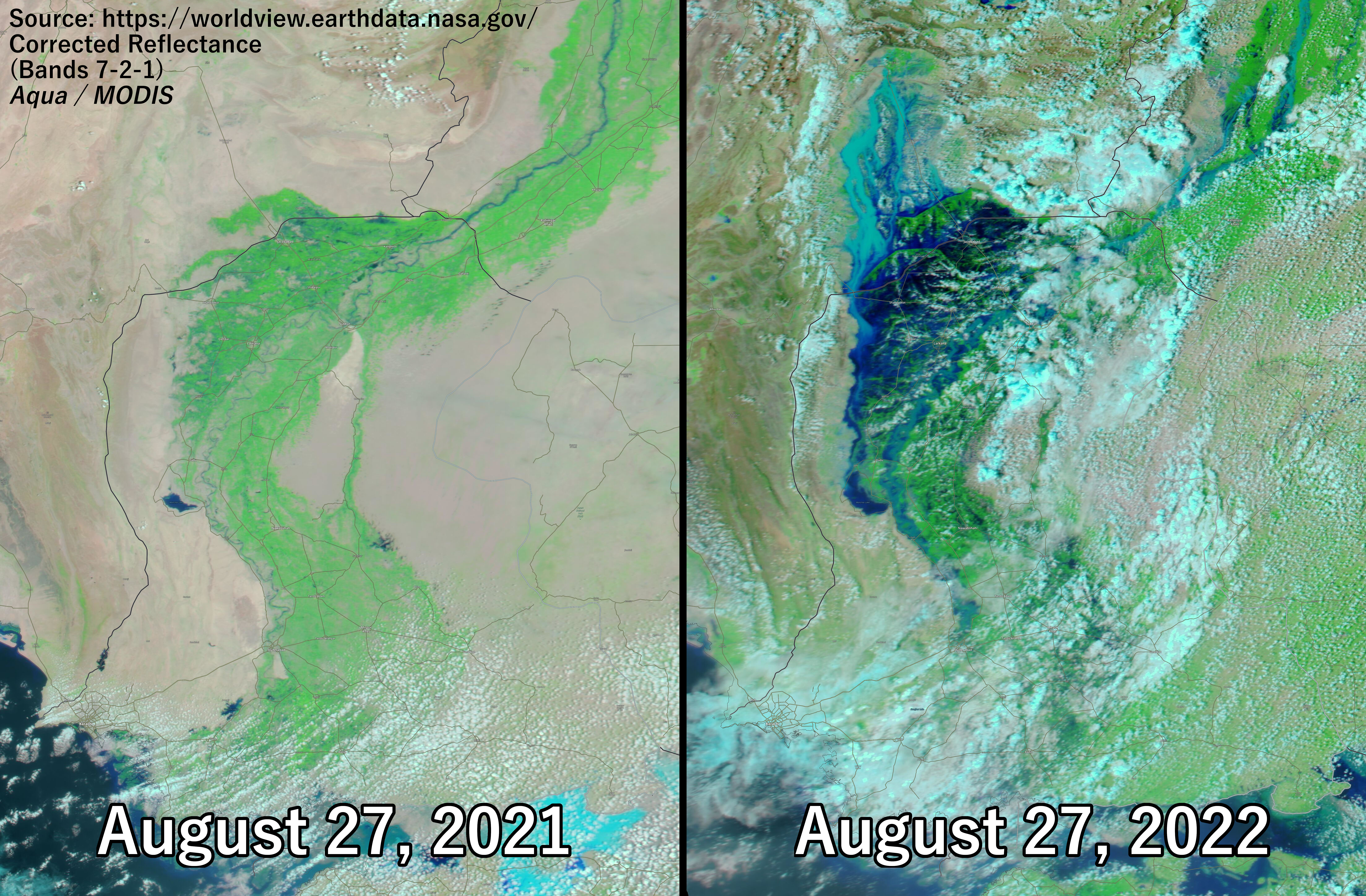
Map comparing Sindh from before the 2022 floods and after

In response to the floods and farmer sit-ins over electricity and fuel bills, Sharif launched the Kissan Package for farmers' relief, forming a federal committee and unveiling a Rs. 600 billion package. As a part of this package, the government would provide Rs. 50 billion subsidised loans to young entrepreneurs in the agriculture sector across the country, alongside Rs. 10 billion to small and medium enterprises in the agriculture sector. In addition to these measures, the package rolled out Rs. 5 billion to landless farmers affected by the floods, and the provision of 1.2 million bags of certified seeds to flood-affected farmers. In regards to cost divisions, Sharif stated that the federal government would provide 50% of the contributions while the four provinces would provide the other 50%. Sharif's government also reduced duties on knock-down kits tractor parts from 35% to 15%, and wheat imports were enhanced to 2.6 million tonnes in order to prevent a national wheat shortage. These measures in the Kissan Package were implemented to enhance the agriculture sector and its related sectors such as the fertiliser industry, and particularly to mitigate the harmful economic effects of the floods on the country.

==== Energy policy ====
Sharif's ascension as prime minister was also marked by an energy crisis in Pakistan as a result of a failure to open completed projects and global fuel and energy prices hiking due to the Russo-Ukrainian War and the COVID-19 pandemic. In June 2025, Sharif's government opted out of an LNG import of $39.8 per MMBTU because of its unaffordability, instead relying on nationwide loadshedding. As a result of this decision, Sharif warned Pakistanis to prepare for loadshedding for the following month as he stated that his government would try and make an energy duel for LNG imports possible. In July 2022, Sharif ordered the resumption of energy production from closed power plants such as the Punjab Thermal Power Plant and the Sahiwal Coal Power Project. Projects such as these two plants were delayed because of a lack of ownership or the breakdown of contractual commitments.

Under his premiership, Sharif began the transition all government buildings to solar power to reduce the government's fuel import bill. He added that this move would be an example for the country's provincial governments, urging provincial leaders to follow suit and standardise the use of solar power for government buildings.

=== Foreign affairs ===
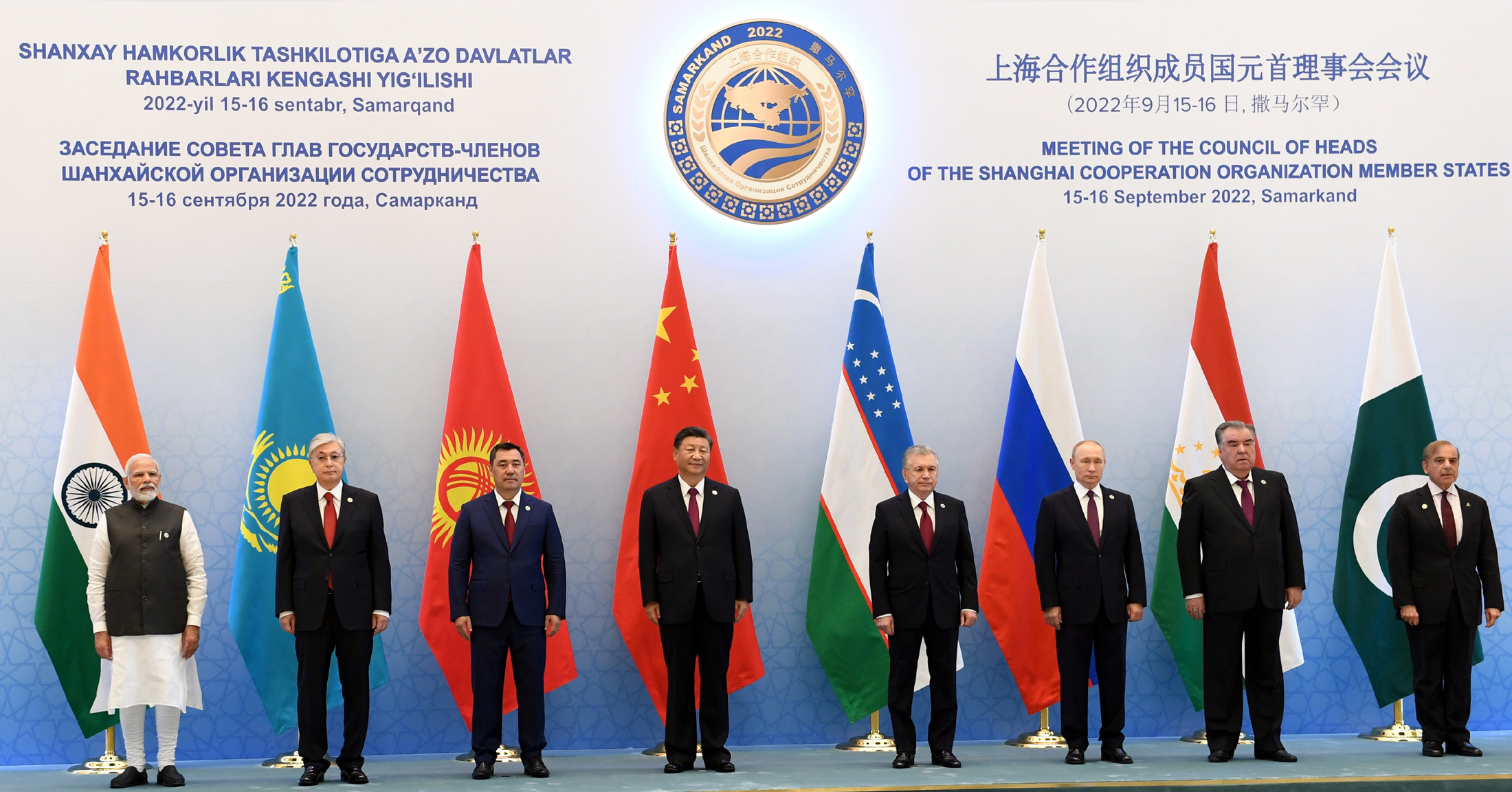
Sharif at the 2022 Shanghai Cooperation Organisation summit in Samarkand, Uzbekistan

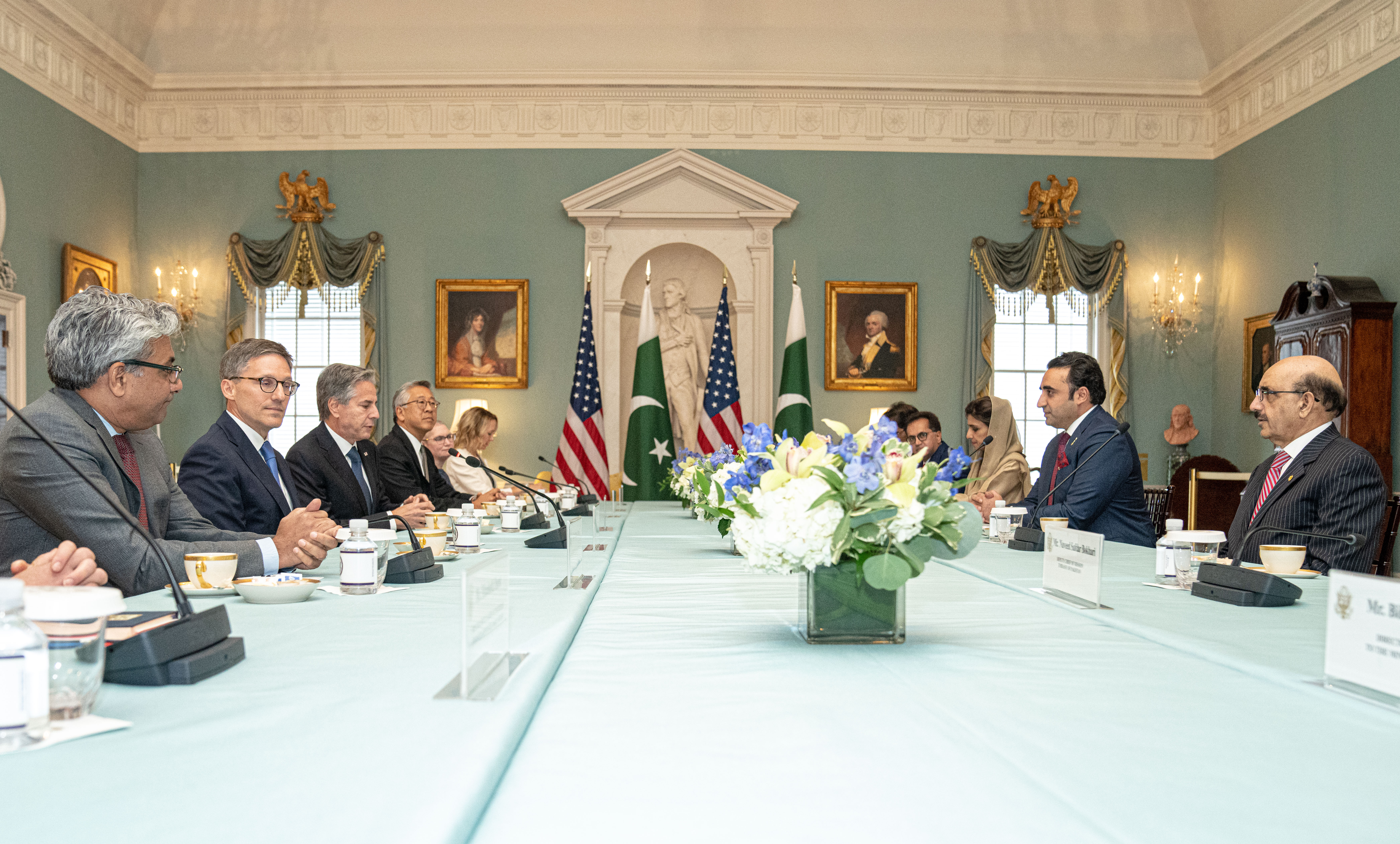
Sharif's Foreign Minister Bilawal Bhutto Zardari meets with US Secretary of State Antony Blinken in September 2022

Sharif's government sought to improve ties with the United States after strained relations due to Lettergate, despite Pakistan's close ties with China. Sharif met US President Joe Biden in New York City in September 2022 during the United Nations General Assembly annual summit. During the meeting, Biden pledged support to Pakistan in the aftermath of the devastating floods. In October 2022, President Biden called Pakistan "one of the most dangerous nations in the world" during an address in California. Sharif and Foreign Minister Bilawal Bhutto Zardari rejected the statement as baseless, and the Ministry of Foreign Affairs summoned the US ambassador for an explanation of Biden's remarks.

Sharif also sought closer ties with China and the amplification of the China–Pakistan Economic Corridor. However, relations grew increasingly complicated due to a rise in attacks on Chinese workers by groups such as the Pakistani Taliban and Balochistan Liberation Army, as the Pakistan Army is responsible for the security of CPEC workers. Sharif visited China on a two-day official visit in November 2022, meeting with Chinese President Xi Jinping and Premier Li Keqiang, and visiting after the 20th National Congress of the Chinese Communist Party. Sharif pledged to revitalise CPEC and expand trade.

Sharif's first visit as prime minister was to Saudi Arabia in April 2022 on a three-day official visit, where he met with Saudi Crown Prince Mohammed bin Salman. Sharif's government also secured an $8 billion package from Saudi Arabia in May 2022, alongside an expansion to a $2.4 billion oil financing facility funded by Saudi Arabia. Sharif visited the United Arab Emirates and Qatar to secure investments in Pakistan; he expressed his desire to facilitate a strong and healthy business environment in Pakistan for Qatari investors during a Pakistan-Qatar trade and investment roundtable meeting in Doha; 2022.

Sharif visited Turkey and met with Turkish President Recep Tayyip Erdoğan on several occasions, seeking to further deepen Pakistan-Turkey relations and enhance trade. He invited Turkey to join CPEC.

Sharif's government also inaugurated a new power transmission line with Iran during a ceremony in Pishin along the Iran–Pakistan border with Iranian President Ebrahim Raisi, facilitating the transmission of up to 100 megawatts of Iranian electricity to Pakistan. Sharif's government also remained committed to the construction of an Iran–Pakistan gas pipeline.

Sharif visited the United Kingdom during the funeral of Elizabeth II in September 2022 as the head of government of a Commonwealth republic, offering condolences to Charles III and meeting with British prime minister Liz Truss. Sharif again visited the United Kingdom for the coronation of Charles III and Queen Camilla, attending the ceremony at Westminster Abbey and meeting with British prime minister Rishi Sunak.

== Between premierships ==
On 9 August 2023, Sharif suggested the dissolution of parliament to President Arif Alvi, three days before the end of its term. On 14 August, the 76th independence day of Pakistan, Sharif's term ended as prime minister and Anwaar ul Haq Kakar was appointed caretaker prime minister until a general election would be held.

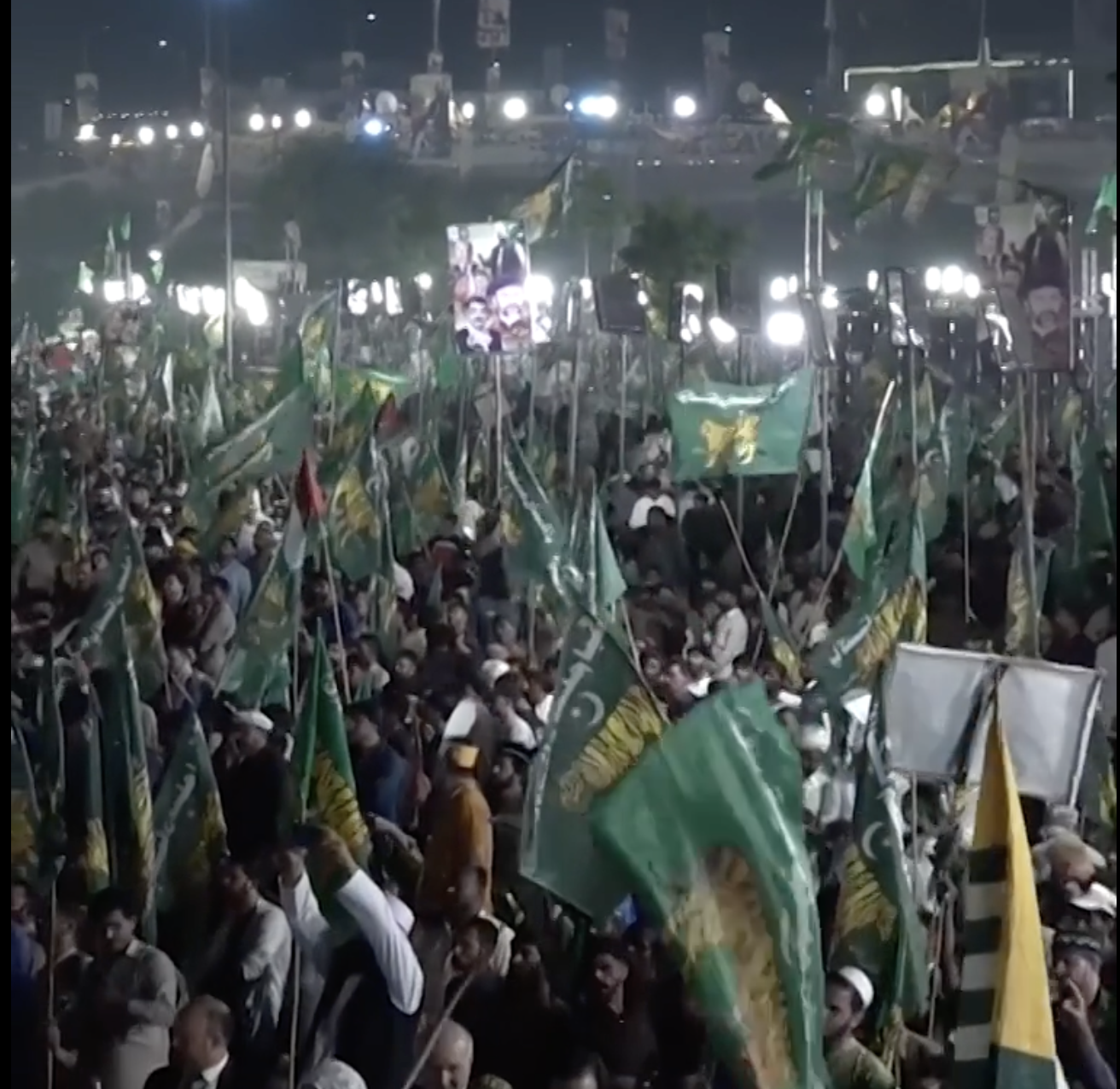
PML(N) supporters during the party's welcome rally in Lahore for Nawaz Sharif's return to Pakistan. October 2023

On 21 October 2023, Sharif welcomed the return of his brother, Nawaz Sharif, to Pakistan after four years of self-imposed exile. Nawaz returned to Pakistan after obtaining protective bail two days prior, which allowed him to return without being arrested. Nawaz's acquisition of protective bail was a result of the Shehbaz government's adoption of a law which allowed for review petitions against previous Supreme Court verdicts to be filed. Shehbaz was a part of the PML(N) welcome rally for Nawaz in Lahore, where tens of thousands of PML(N) supporters awaited Nawaz's arrival.

On 22 December 2023, the Election Commission of Pakistan ruled that the PTI would not be allowed to use its party symbol in the upcoming elections, citing that the party failed to hold intra-party elections up to the commission's standards. This decision was widely controversial and viewed as pre-poll rigging by eliminating PTI opposition, thus clearing the way for Nawaz Sharif to win the election and become prime minister with ease.

A general election was held on 8 February 2024, with Nawaz Sharif serving as the PML(N) candidate for prime minister. However, Nawaz did not get his projected easy victory as PTI candidates, running as independents, managed to secure the most seats. The PML(N) won the second most seats while the PPP won the third most; however, neither the independent candidates or the two largest parties were able to secure the 169 seats needed for a majority. On 20 February, the PML(N) and PPP formed a minority coalition government, and Shehbaz was chosen as the prime ministerial candidate over Nawaz. As a part of the coalition arrangement, senior PPP leader Asif Ali Zardari, was chosen as the coalition's candidate for president. The general election was marred with controversy as Pakistan's military establishment was accused of rigging the election to prevent the PTI from winning. International media also denounced the election while members of the international community voiced concern over its fairness.

== Prime Minister (2024–present) ==
On 3 March 2024, Sharif was re-elected as prime minister for a second term after a disputed general election, receiving 201 votes against 92 for the PTI candidate, Omar Ayub, in the National Assembly. He formed a coalition government with the Pakistan People's Party, Muttahida Qaumi Movement – Pakistan, the Pakistan Muslim League (Q), the Istehkam-e-Pakistan Party, and the Balochistan Awami Party.

=== Economy ===
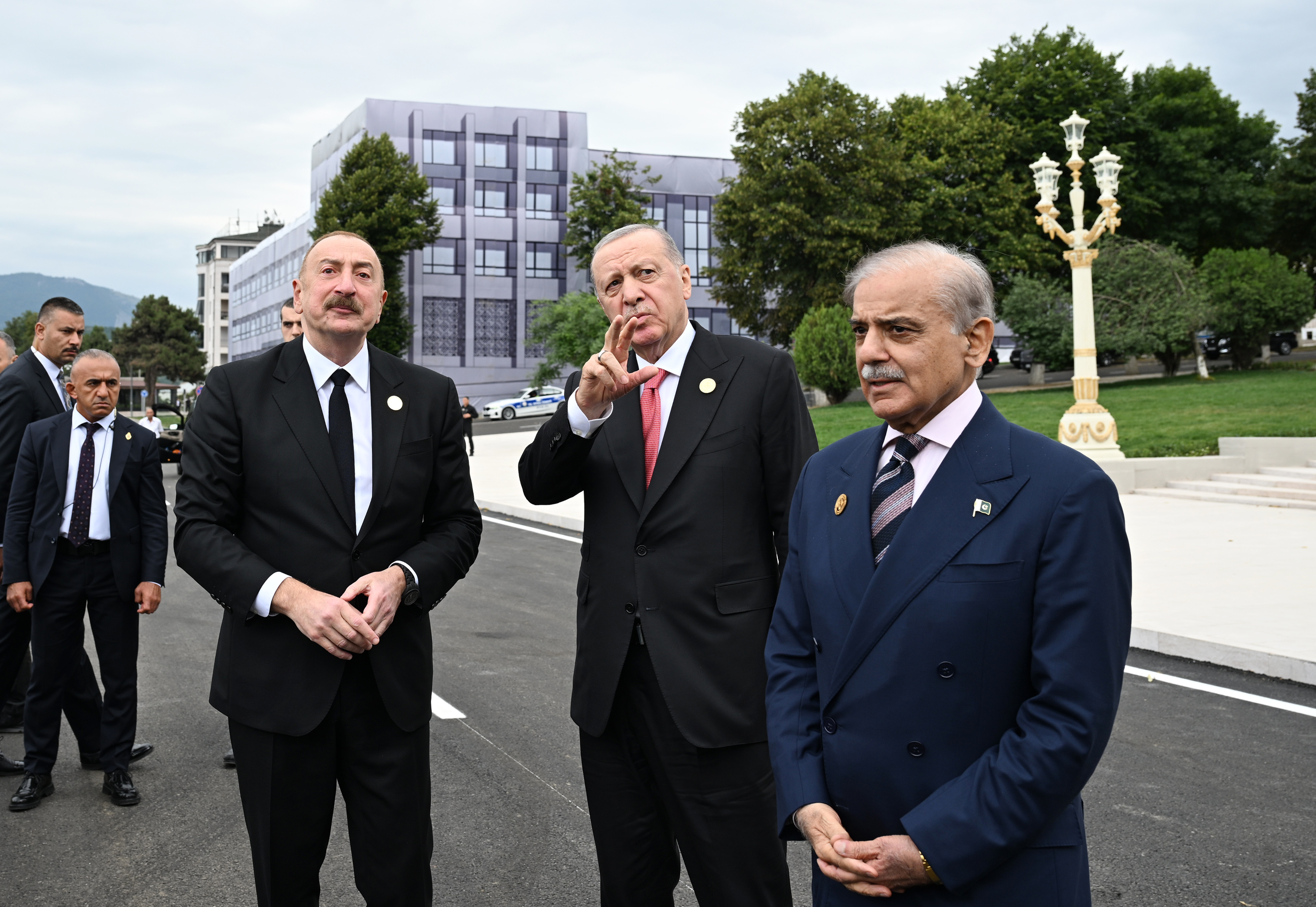
With Azerbaijani President Ilham Aliyev and Turkish President Recep Tayyip Erdoğan during the 17th summit of the Economic Cooperation Organization, July 2025

Immediately after his swearing-in, Sharif directed preparations for a national economic revival plan. He opened talks with the International Monetary Fund (IMF) on a new loan, ordered the Federal Board of Revenue o clear tax refunds worth Rs65 billion, and announced that loss-making state-owned enterprises (SOEs) would be privatised. He appointed Muhammad Aurangzeb, a former president of Habib Bank Limited and JPMorgan banker, as finance minister.

The government negotiated a bailout agreement with the IMF in July 2024 and secured a $7 billion programme in September. To meet IMF fiscal targets, it raised taxes substantially and brought private companies into the new tax scheme, raising the exporters' rate from 1% to 29% on top of a 30% corporate tax, the highest in South Asia. In August 2024, Sharif's government announced plans to renegotiate contracts with independent power producer to reduce costs.

The government later launched Uraan Pakistan, a five-year plan centred on what it termed the "five Es": Exports; E-Pakistan; Equity and Empowerment; Environment, Food and Water Security; and Energy and Infrastructure. Its targets included achieving a 6% annual GDP growth by 2028, the creation of 1 million jobs per year, boosting exports to $60 billion annually by 2028, and $10 billion worth of private investment annually. The plan also envisaged Pakistan to emerge as a trillion dollar economy by 2035. Amid austerity measures, the government increased the monthly salaries of ministers and advisers by 188% to Rs519,000, drawing criticism.

Beginning in May 2025 the government began privatising more than 50 SOEs, excluding "strategic" ones, in three phases over four years.. The IMF had recommended the move because the SOEs hold substantial assets but employ few people, and over half operate at a loss. Inflation fell to 3.5% that month.

The 2026 Iran war strained the economy, as Pakistan sources nearly 90% of its energy imports from the Middle East. In March 2026, in response to rising global fuel prices caused by the Iran war, Sharif announced emergency energy-saving measures, including a four-day work week and school closures. Following the IMF's third programme review in May 2026, the fund cut its growth forecast for the fiscal year 2026-27 to 3.5% and raised its inflation forecast to 8.4%. On 5 June, the government presented a Rs18.77 trillion ($67.49 billion) budget for 2026-27, with higher defence spending and targets of 4% growth and 8.2% inflation, and with reduced taxes on property purchases meant to stimulate construction. Analysts warned that meeting the IMF's revenue target would be difficult. On 13 September, amid continued rises in fuel prices, Sharif announced a relief scheme for users of motorcycles, rickshaws, and vehicles of up to 800cc.

=== Social policy and environment ===
Sharif's government has promoted youth empowerment and entrepreneurship. On International Youth Day in 2024, Sharif announced an Rs.100 billion boost for over 300,000 young entrepreneurs as a part of the Prime Minister's Youth Programme, in addition to the launch of several youth empowerment schemes. He also announced that the government would provide 1 million smartphones, tablets, and laptops to students across the country on the basis of merit, alongside personally funding the education of 1,000 graduates of agriculture in China. Sharif also created a youth employment action plan across Pakistan. As a part of this plan, a laptop scheme provided over 600,000 laptops on the basis of merit to young Pakistanis, in addition to youth training initiatives across 268 universities across the country under the Prime Minister Green Youth Program. Sharif also formed the National Youth Council, composed of 113 youth representatives (aged 10–29), aimed at amplifying youth development and integrating young Pakistanis into policy-making.

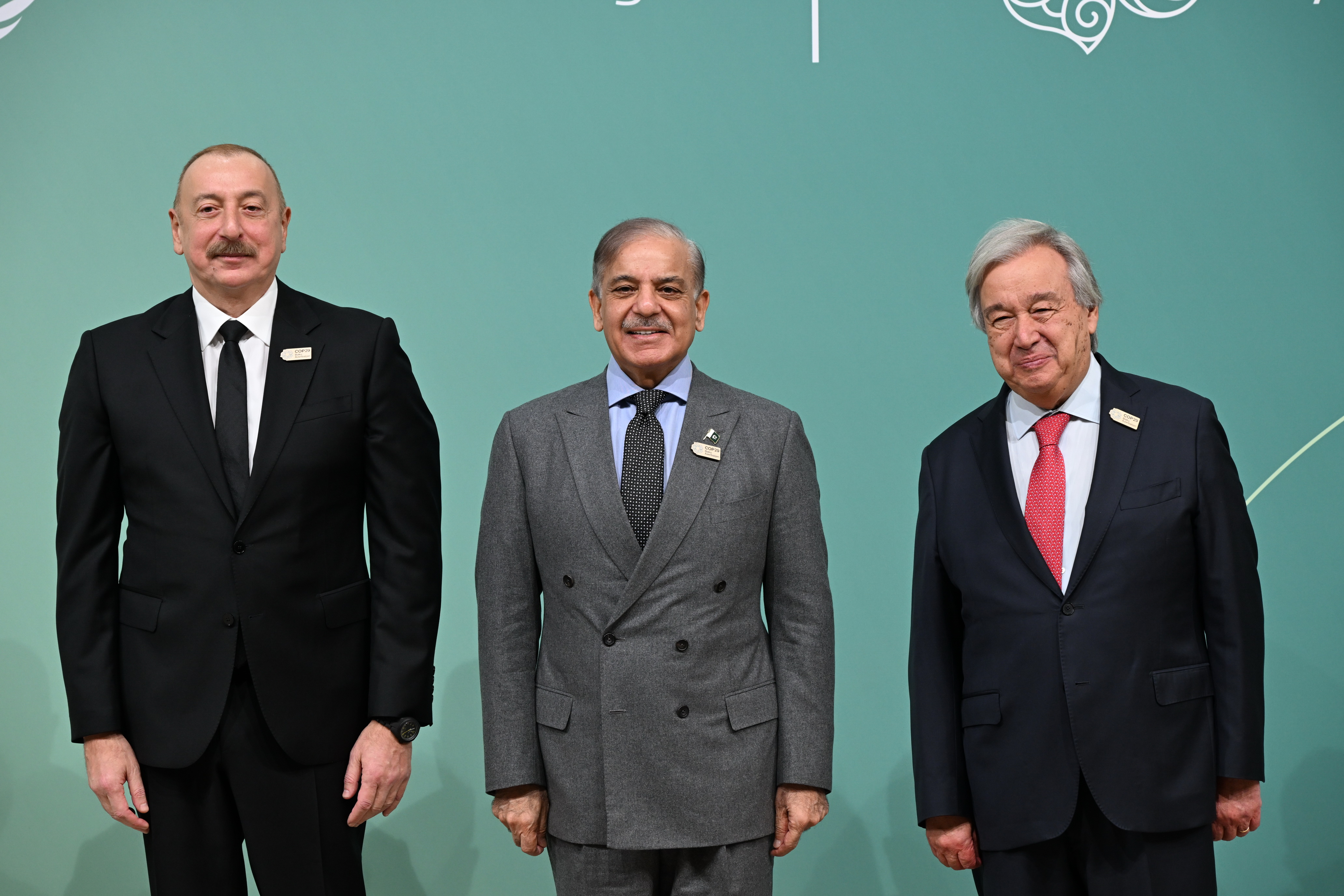
At the opening ceremony of COP29 with Azerbaijani President Ilham Aliyev and United Nations Secretary-General António Guterres in Baku, November 2024

At the November 2024 United Nations Climate Change Conference in Baku, Sharif presented Pakistan’s priorities for climate, emphasising the need for global "climate justice." Moreover, he revealed his government's National Climate Finance Strategy (NCFS), which sought to reduce Pakistan's greenhouse gas emissions to 50% of the national economy, leveraging 60% of clean energy resources, and shifting 30% of vehicles to electric vehicles (EVs) by 2030.

Sharif's government has enhanced climate cooperation with international partners including through the Shanghai Cooperation Organisation's Green Belt Programme and the Mangrove Sustainability Initiative, a project to protect, restore, and manage mangrove ecosystems across the globe.

On World Health Day 2024, Sharif vowed to expand medical facilities across Pakistan to be accessible for all people, partnering with provincial governments to upgrade and establish medical facilities, launch mobile health clinics, and ensure cost-free treatment for lower-and-middle class families. Sharif also ordered the use of advanced technology to advance digitised health reforms across the country, alongside the creation of oversight mechanisms to crack down on healthcare violations.

=== Constitutional changes ===
In September 2024, Sharif's government announced a "Constitutional Package" which would create a new Federal Constitutional Court. This new court would handle petitions pertaining strictly to interpretations of constitutional clauses. The package also included raising the retirement age of judges in the proposed Constitutional Court to 68, while other judges in Pakistan are required to retire by 65. The package also included a clause that would rule individual legislators' votes against their respective parties as void. In October 2024, Parliament passed the Twenty-sixth Amendment, which expanded parliamentary powers, particularly allowing a parliamentary committee to select the Supreme Court's chief justice. The new amendment was heavily criticised as attacking judicial independence, particularly amplifying judicial action against the PTI and other political opponents. According to the New York City Bar Association, the amendment undermined the separation of powers and judicial independence in Pakistan, hindering the impartiality of the judiciary.

In November 2025, Parliament passed the twenty-seventh Amendment to the Constitution of Pakistan proposed by Sharif's government, which asserted the authority of the Federal Constitutional Court—in which judges are selected by the executive branch, and modified Pakistan's military structure. The amendment created the post of Chief of Defence Forces—given to Field Marshal Asim Munir—which oversees all three branches of the Pakistan Armed Forces, and provides Munir with lifelong immunity from criminal prosecution. The Human Rights Commission of Pakistan questioned the government's urgency in passing the amendment, while Reema Omer, a legal adviser for the International Commission of Jurists, warned that the new amendment only emboldens the executive and legislative branches, weakening the authority of the judiciary and degrading any balance of power within the government. She described the amendment as a "constitutional surrender."

=== Counterterrorism and security ===
In June 2024, Sharif chaired a meeting of the Apex Committee on the National Action Plan in Islamabad, and announced the launch of Operation Azm-e-Istehkam, a major counterterrorism initiative that involved both military action and socioeconomic development to hinder the spread of radicalism and terrorism in Pakistan. The launch of the operation came amidst a rise in terrorism in Pakistan in the aftermath of the Taliban takeover of Afghanistan, with militant groups such as the Pakistani Taliban taking shelter in Afghanistan to use it as a base for attacks on Pakistani security forces.

Sharif's government has repeatedly accused India of financially supporting the Pakistani Taliban and other militant groups that operate in Khyber Pakhtunkhwa and Balochistan, describing the Pakistani Taliban as Fitna-al-khawarij (lit. 'Conflict of Kharijites') and Baloch rebel groups as Fitna-al-Hindustan (lit. 'Conflict of India').

Sharif condemned the hijacking of the Jaffar Express on 11 March 2025, describing it as a 'cowardly act.' He stated that the perpetrators, whom he identified as members of the Balochistan Liberation Army (BLA), were enemies of the province's development and reaffirmed the government's resolve to eliminate terrorism from the region.

Sharif's government's continued and expanded the deportation of undocumented Afghans from Pakistan that first began under the Anwaar ul Haq Kakar caretaker government in December 2023, citing these undocumented Afghans as a security threat. As of late 2025, the UNHCR confirmed that more than one million Afghans have returned from Pakistan to Afghanistan in 2025. Following directives from Sharif's government, this campaign has expanded beyond undocumented individuals to include holders of Afghan Citizen Cards (ACC) and Proof of Registration (PoR) cards, with thousands of arrests reported monthly in early 2026.

=== Civil-military relations ===
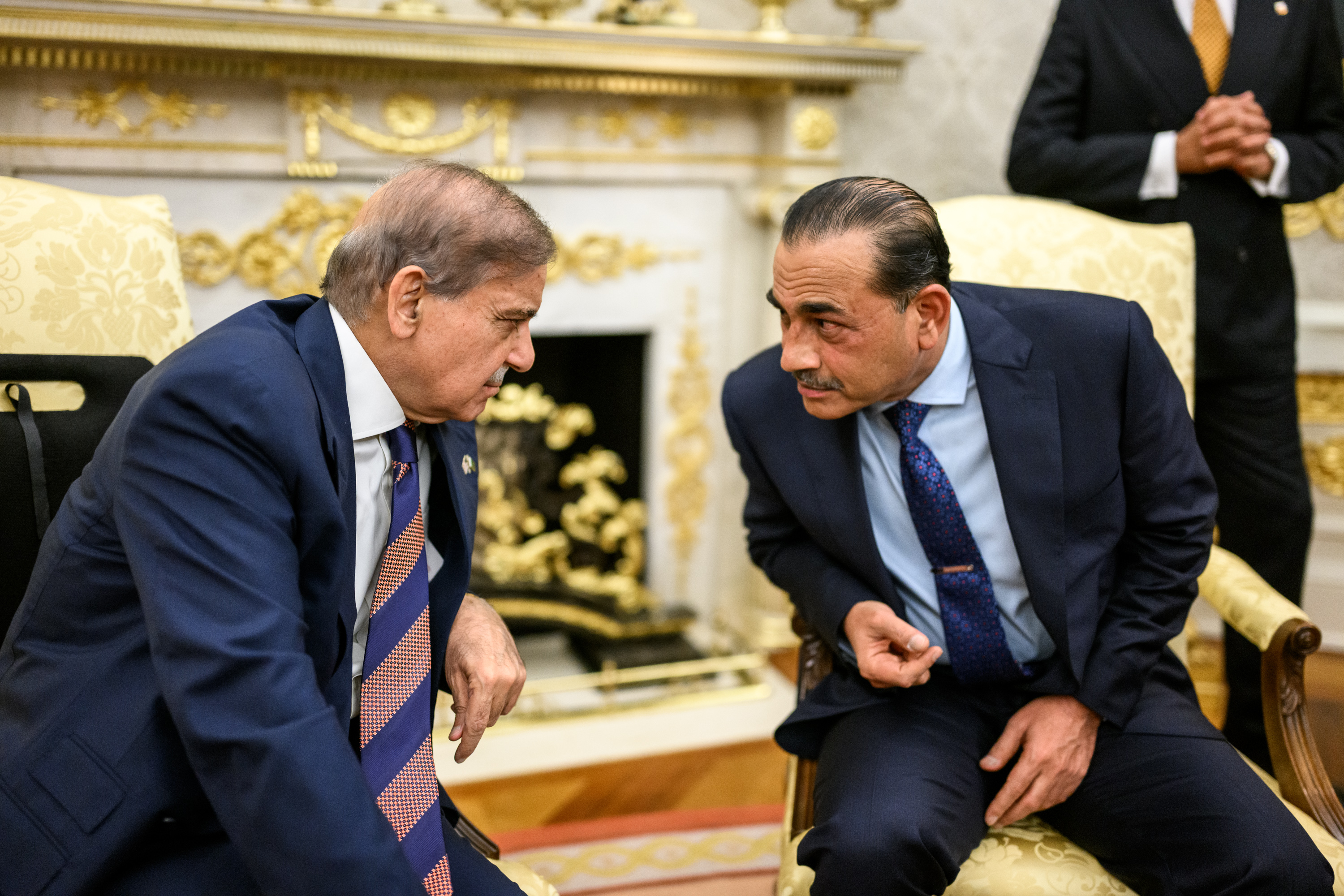
With Chief of Army Staff Asim Munir at the White House, September 2025

During his premiership, Sharif has maintained positive relations with the Pakistani military. Sharif publicly stated that his government and the military were “on the same page” regarding all key national issues, including national security, counterterrorism, and economic development.

Sharif developed a particularly cordial relationship with Chief of Army Staff Asim Munir, describing his relationship with the army as a "role model" for the future. The two leaders held multiple joint meetings on national security and foreign policy, including consultations on Pakistan’s response to India following the 2025 India–Pakistan conflict.

In May 2025, the federal cabinet approved Munir’s promotion to the rank of Field Marshal, citing his “decisive leadership” during the conflict. The promotion ceremony, attended by both Sharif and President Asif Ali Zardari, was held at the Aiwan-e-Sadr in Islamabad, where Munir was formally conferred the baton of Field Marshal.

Sharif’s cooperative stance with the military was seen as an effort to maintain political stability and avoid confrontation with the country's powerful military establishment. His government’s approach was described by Defence Minister Khawaja Asif as a “hybrid model” of governance, combining civilian and military decision-making in national and economic affairs.

=== Foreign policy ===
==== Middle East ====
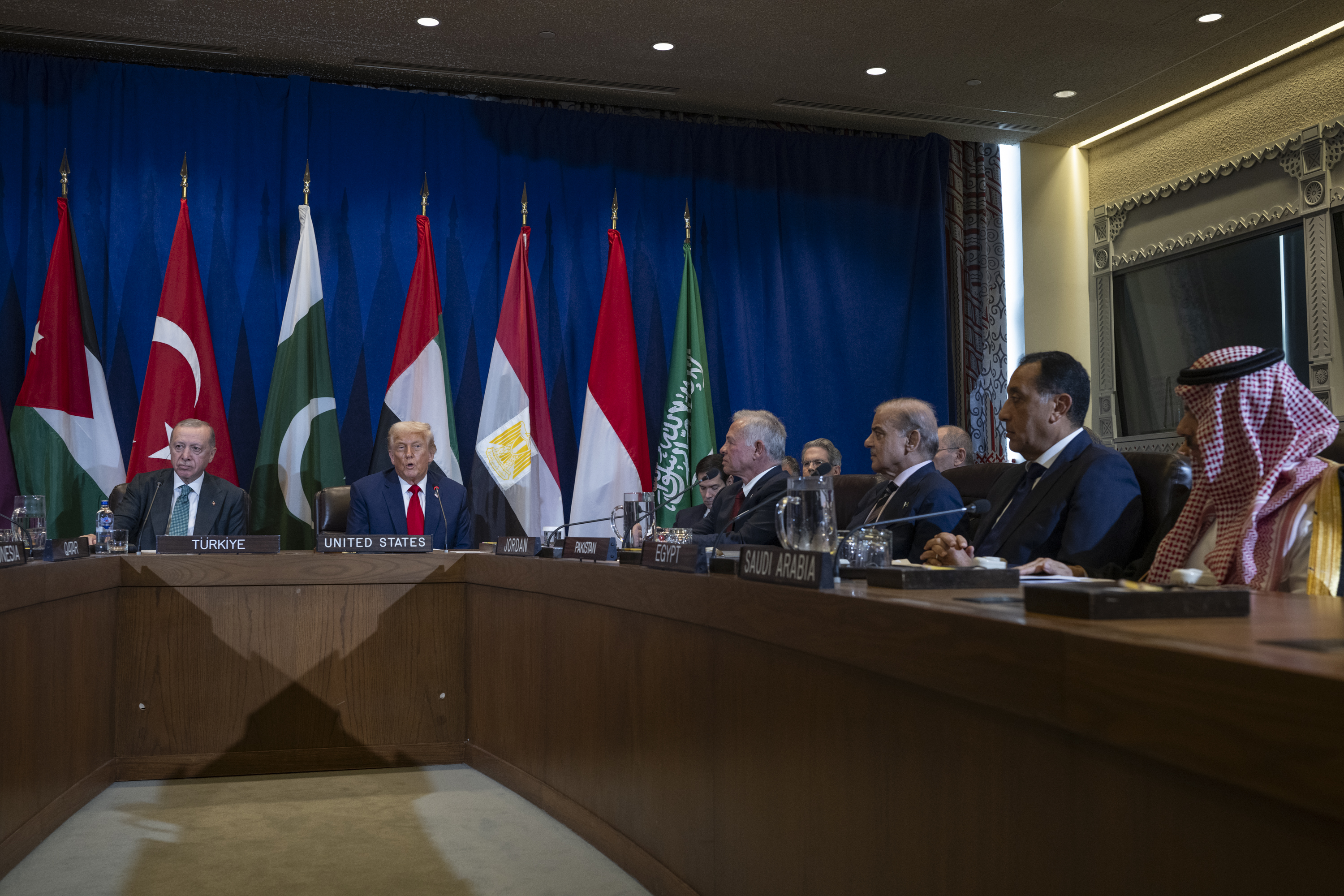
With other Muslim leaders and US President Donald Trump in New York City to discuss the Gaza war, September 2025

Sharif's first foreign visit during his second premiership was to Saudi Arabia in 2024, where he met Crown Prince Mohammed bin Salman. The two agreed to release the first part of a $5 billion Saudi investment. In September 2025, following the Israeli strike on Doha, Pakistan and Saudi Arabia signed the Strategic Mutual Defence Agreement; Saudi officials said it reflected "years of discussions" rather than a response to recent regional developments. Sharif met Iranian President Ebrahim Raisi in April 2024 after the January exchange of strikes between the two countries, and expressed support for Iran during the June 2025 Iran–Israel war. Sharif also cultivated ties with the United Arab Emirates (UAE), whose president, Mohamed bin Zayed, committed to invest $10 billion in Pakistan in May 2024. In November 2025, Sharif hosted King Abdullah II of Jordan to Pakistan on a two-day visit, inviting him to the Global Industrial Defence Solutions in Rawalpindi for a review of Pakistan's indigenous defence production.

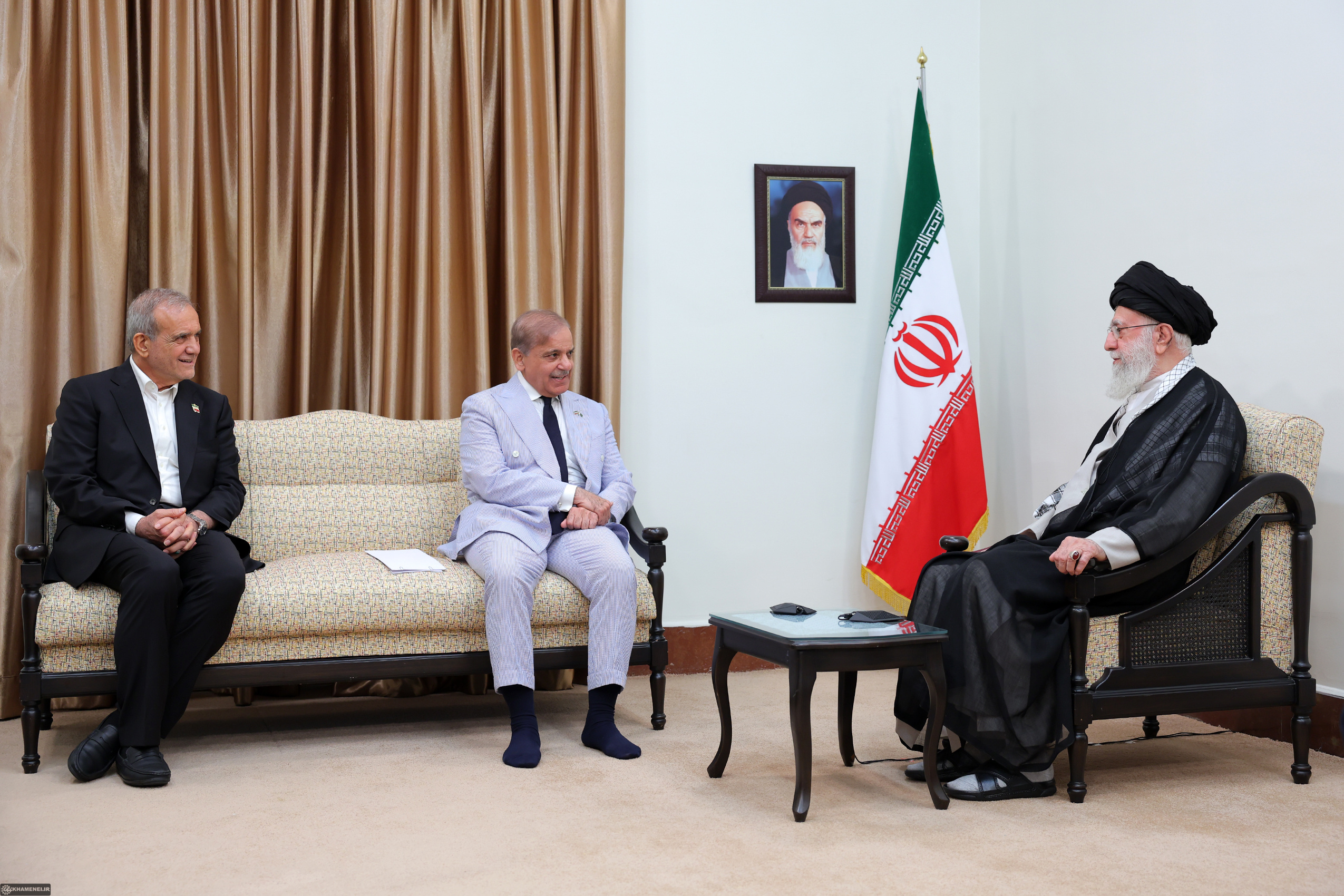
With Iranian President Masoud Pezeshkian and Supreme Leader Ali Khamenei in Tehran, May 2025

Sharif condemned Israel's war in Gaza, which he described as a genocide, and supported an independent Palestinian state. In September 2025, he nonetheless backed Donald Trump's Gaza Strip proposal as "a vital step towards peace in the Middle East," and Trump praised his support. In January 2026, Pakistan accepted an invitation to join the Board of Peace for Gaza's reconstruction.

In February 2026, Sharif condemned U.S.-Israeli strikes on Iran and the Assassination of Ali Khamenei, describing the event as a violation of international law. On 12 March, Sharif met with Mohammed bin Salman in Jeddah to express Pakistan's solidarity with Saudi Arabia in the wake of Iranian strikes on Saudi Arabia. On 8 April, Pakistan brokered a two-week temporary ceasefire between Iran and the United States. Talks in Islamabad on 11 April, attended by U.S. Vice President JD Vance and Iranian Foreign Minister Abbas Araghchi, ended without agreement the next day, after which the United States imposed a naval blockade of Iranian ports. Pakistan continued to mediate alongside Qatar, and on 17 June, U.S. President Donald Trump and Iranian President Masoud Pezeshkian signed the Islamabad Memorandum. The agreement extended the ceasefire by 60 days to negotiate a final deal, and Sharif signed it as endorser. Each side later accused the other of violating the memorandum, and the ceasefire collapsed on 8 July after Iran attacked commercial vessels in the Strait of Hormuz.

On 7 August 2026, Sharif, Saudi Crown Prince Mohammed bin Salman, and Turkish President Recep Tayyip Erdoğan signed the Mecca Defence Alliance in Mecca. It treats an armed attack on any one of the three states as an attack on all.

==== United States ====
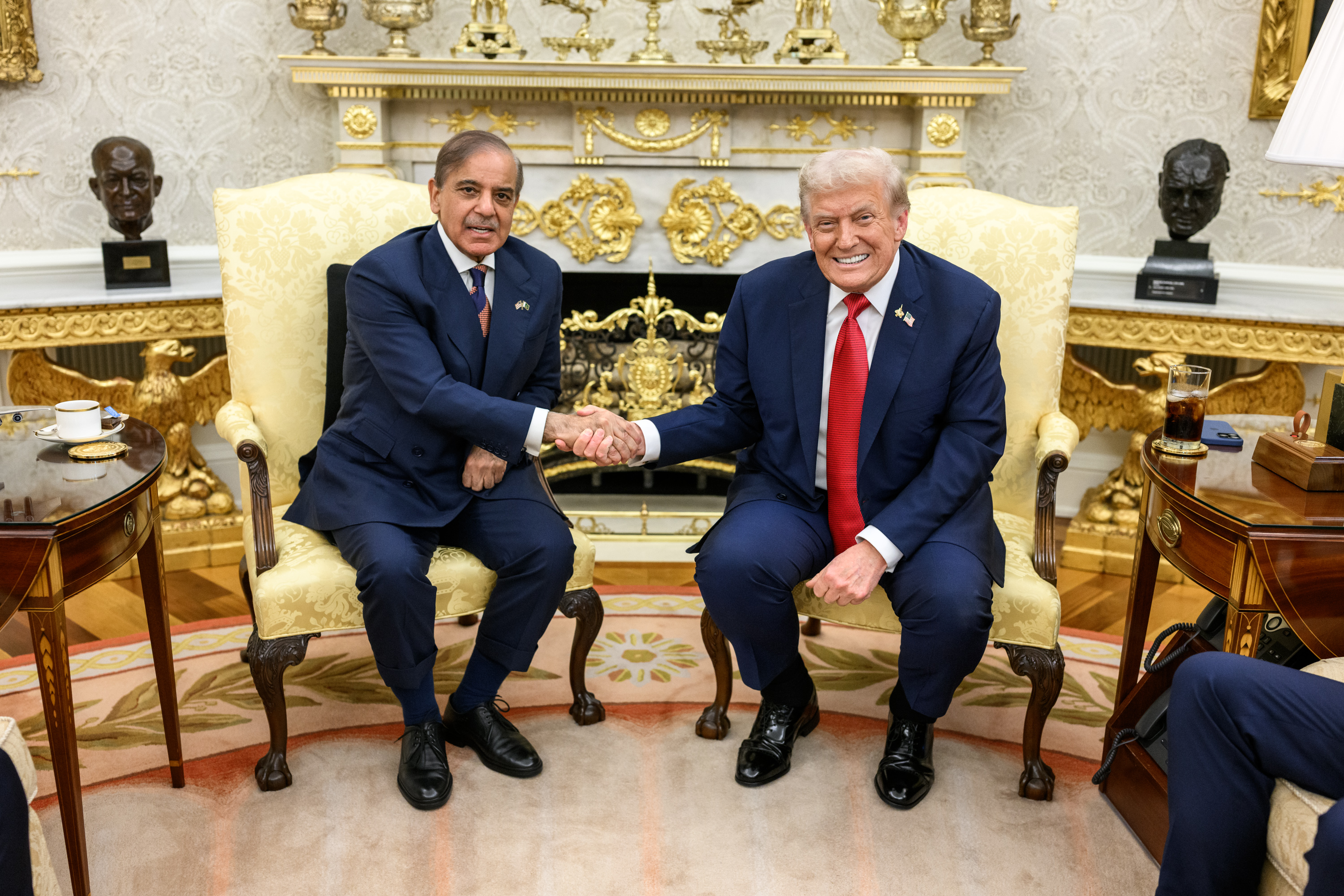
With US President Donald Trump at the White House, September 2025

In April 2025, Sharif met with a United States delegation led by Eric Meyer, Senior Bureau Official for the State Department’s Bureau of South and Central Asian Affairs, and announced that US companies seek to invest in Pakistan's untapped minerals. Sharif also emphasised the cruciality of American mediation in de-escalating the 2025 India-Pakistan conflict, with the Pakistani government nominating Donald Trump for the Nobel Peace Prize for his role in mediating an end to the conflict. Trump also met with Pakistan's Chief of Army Staff Asim Munir in June 2025, signalling a major thaw in relations between the two countries. In July, Sharif's government negotiated a trade deal with the US which included American investment in Pakistan's crude oil reserves in its territorial waters. The deal also included partnerships in cryptocurrency and information technology. In September 2025, Sharif attended a conference with Muslim leaders and Trump on the sidelines of the Eightieth session of the United Nations General Assembly to establish an end to the Gaza war. In the same month, Sharif visited the White House and met with Trump. During the October 2025 Gaza Peace Summit, Sharif announced his intention to nominate Trump for the Nobel Peace Prize for a second time.

==== China ====
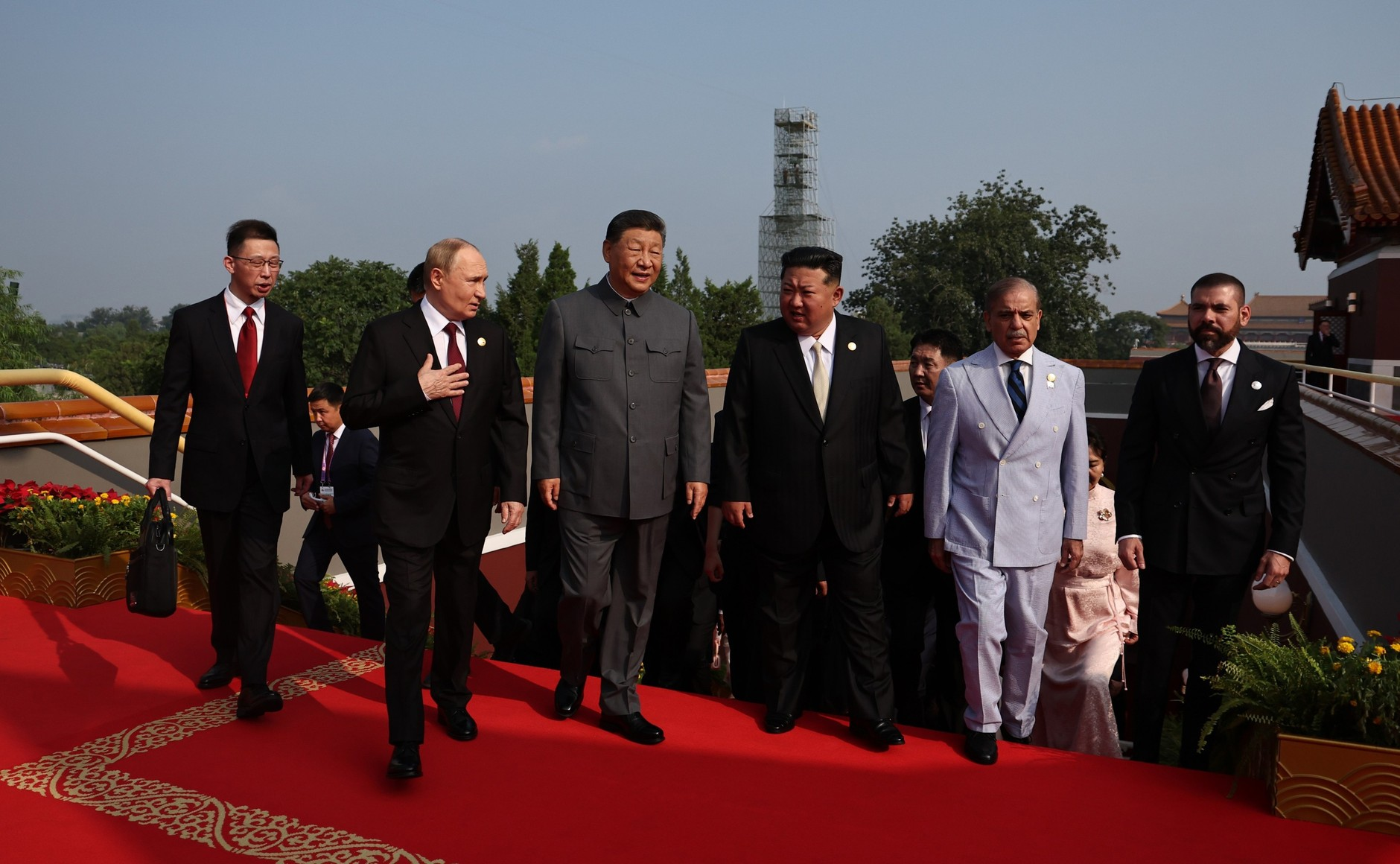
With Vladimir Putin of Russia, Xi Jinping of China, and Kim Jong Un of North Korea for the China Victory Day Parade, September 2025

Sharif's government pledged to revive the stagnating CPEC through cooperation on infrastructure and mining. This desire to amplify cooperation comes amidst increasing attacks on Chinese workers in Pakistan by militant groups aiming at disrupting CPEC, which has affected China-Pakistan relations. However, China's significant defence cooperation with Pakistan contributed to Pakistan downing Western-manufactured Indian aircraft, particularly a Rafale, during its 2025 conflict against India.

==== South Asia ====
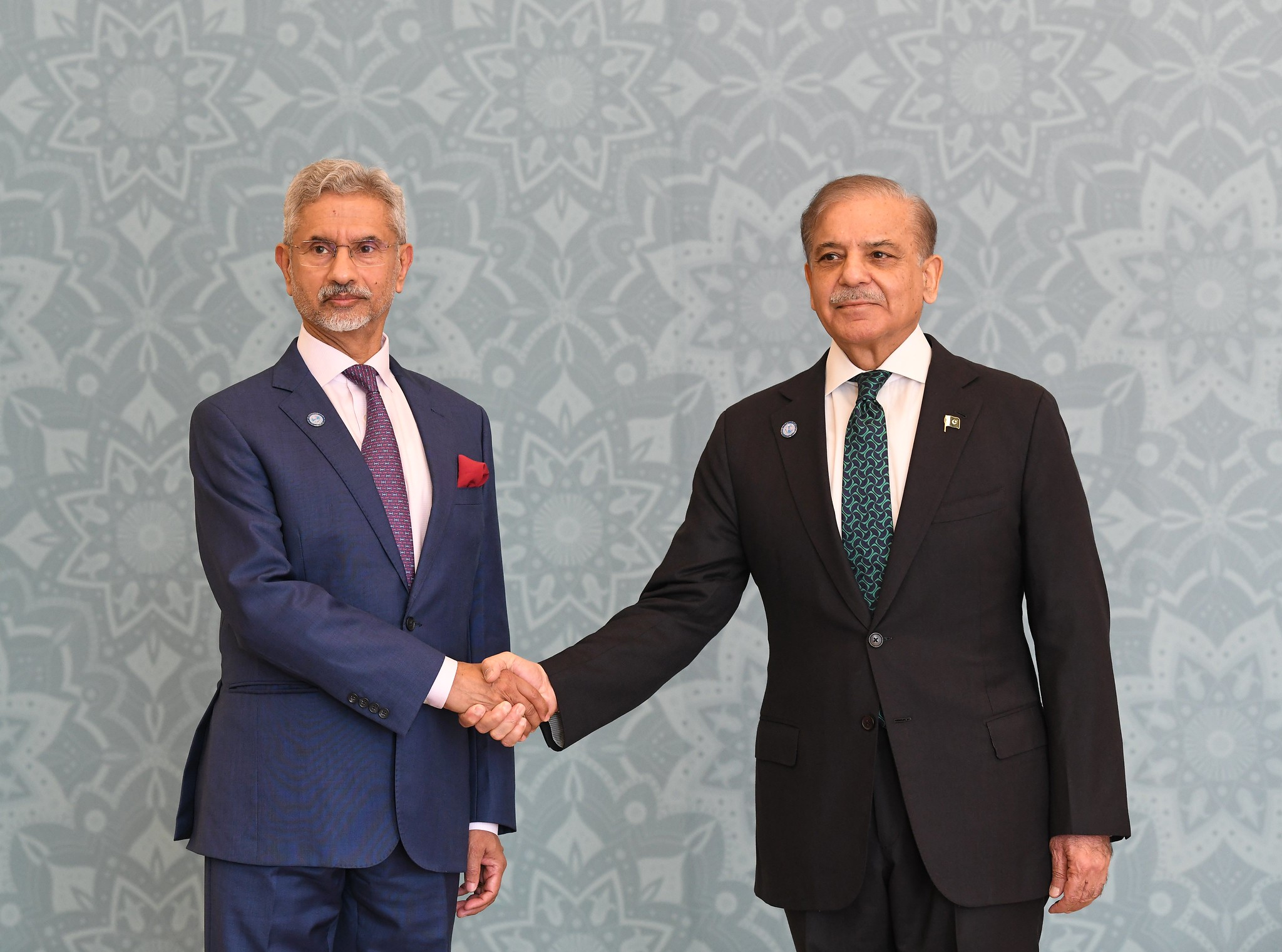
With Indian Foreign Minister S. Jaishankar during the Shanghai Cooperation Organisation summit in Islamabad, October 2024

In October 2024, Sharif hosted Indian External Affairs Minister S. Jaishankar at the Shanghai Cooperation Organisation summit in Islamabad, marking the first such visit since 2015. Relations between India and Pakistan subsequently deteriorated following an April 2025 militant attack in Pahalgam, Indian-administered Jammu and Kashmir, which India blamed on Pakistan, a charge that Sharif's government denied. The following crisis led to reciprocal diplomatic measures, including the suspension of the Indus Waters Treaty and Simla Agreement by India and Pakistan, respectively. In May 2025, Sharif oversaw Pakistan's response to Indian military strikes through the launch of Operation Bunyan un-Marsoos (Note: Bunyan-un-Marsoos is an Arabic term meaning "Unbreakable Wall". The name is derived from a verse in the Quran. The verse states: "Surely Allah loves those who fight in His cause in ˹solid˺ ranks as if they were one concrete structure."- Quran 61:4) against Indian military sites, after which both sides declared a ceasefire. Sharif later declared victory over India and designated 16 May as Youm-e-Tashakur ('Day of Gratitude'), though the conflict produced no clear winner.

Sharif met with Bangladeshi Chief Adviser Muhammad Yunus in December 2024 during a Developing-8 summit in Cairo, the first meeting between Pakistani and Bangladeshi senior leaders since the July Revolution in Bangladesh. Sharif sought to bolster ties with Bangladesh, launching direct cargo shipments from Pakistan to Chittagong Port and offering 300 scholarships to Bangladeshi students.

Sharif sought to improve relations with Afghanistan while urging its government to take action against the Tehrik-i-Taliban Pakistan (TTP), which Pakistan accuses of operating from Afghan territory. In March 2024, he authorised airstrikes in Eastern Afghanistan targeting TTP strongholds.

While addressing the eightieth session of the UNGA, Sharif publicly claimed that Pakistan faced problems from terrorist groups operating from "Afghan soil." In October 2025, Sharif oversaw Pakistani military operations against both the Afghan Taliban and the TTP as the Pakistani military struck Afghan border posts and cities, including Kabul and Kandahar.

Fighting escalated further in 2026. After Pakistani airstrikes on alleged TTP camps on 21-22 February and Taliban attacks on border posts on 26 February, Pakistan attacked targets in Kabul, Kandahar, and elsewhere declared "open war" on 27 February. A March ceasefire collapsed, and talks hosted by China in Ürümqi did not produce a lasting settlement. After nearly three months of relative calm following Pakistani airstrikes in late June, fighting resumed in September with airstrikes and cross-border attacks.

=== Democratic backsliding ===
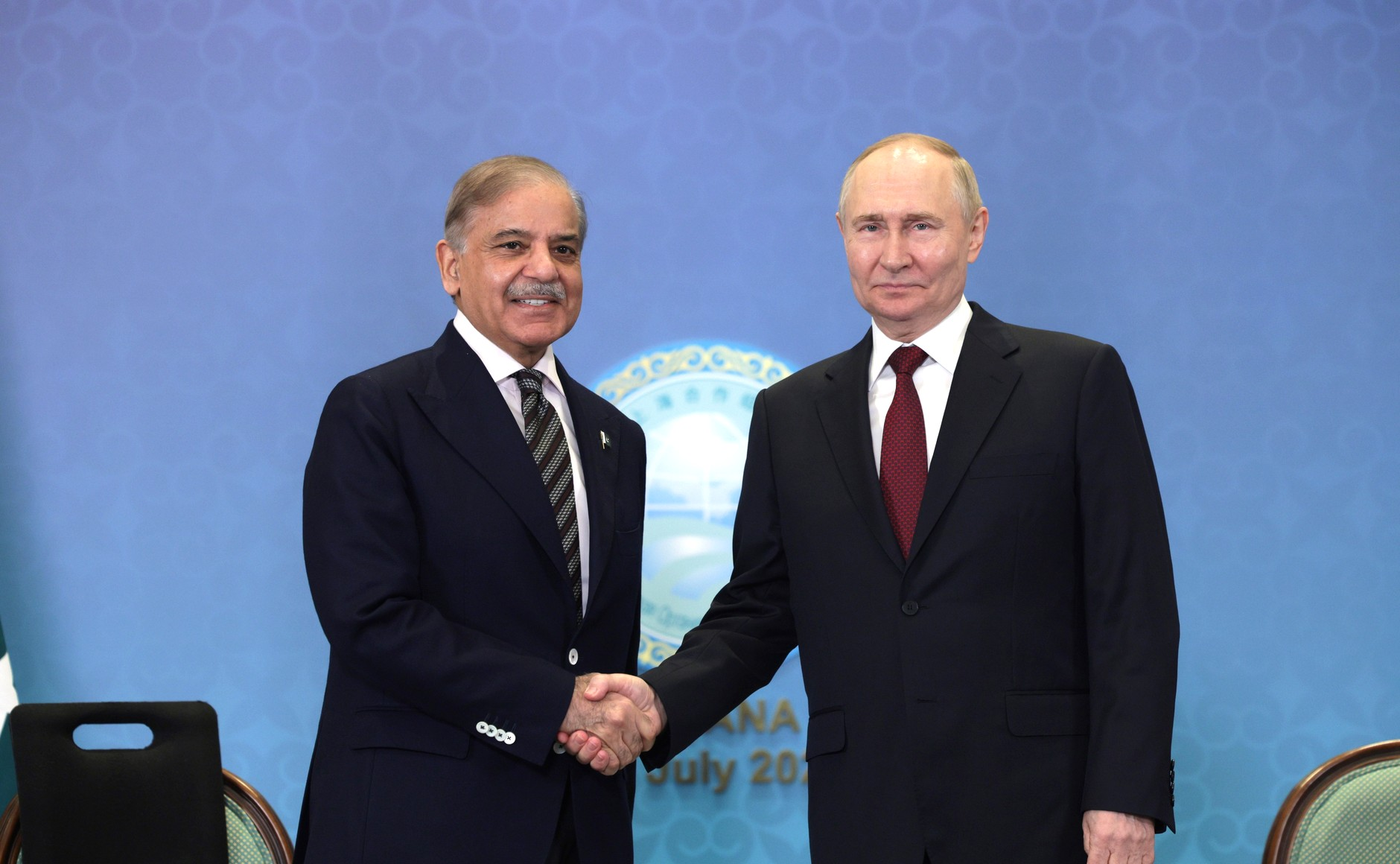
Shehbaz meeting with Russian President Vladimir Putin at the 2024 Astana SCO summit in Astana, Kazakhstan

Immediately after becoming prime minister for his second term, PTI supporters across Pakistan began major protests and demonstrations on 11 March, calling for Sharif's removal from office on allegations of electoral rigging in the 2024 general election. These protests also called for the restoration of the PTI's "stolen mandate" and the release of senior PTI leaders, including Imran Khan and Shah Mahmood Qureshi. In response to these protests, the Pakistani police launched a large-scale national crackdown, arresting and attacking PTI protestors.

On 15 July 2024, Information Minister Attaullah Tarar announced that the government was considering a ban on the PTI, citing the violent 2023 Pakistani protests and the PTI allegedly "leaking classified information." The plan to ban the PTI received large-scale backlash from both inside Pakistan and internationally, with several prominent politicians, journalists, and lawyers condemning the move. According to the Brookings Institution, the move against the PTI revealed the government's "weakness and political insecurity," and the move comes during a period where the judiciary of Pakistan is experiencing increasing state pressure to crack down on political opposition.

Sharif's government continued the unofficial ban on social media platform Twitter (X) imposed by the Kakar caretaker government, and installed an internet firewall. The firewall was created by the government in order to block content that it deemed as propaganda. The firewall was widely criticised for censorship. Furthermore, the internet firewall project was estimated to cost $300 Million. The firewall negatively affected businesses in Pakistan.

The government's handling of political unrest, including the May 9 riots, the political crises of 2022–2024, the 2023 protests, the 2025 Tehreek-e-Labbaik protests, and the 26 November 2024 PTI protest in Islamabad, has drawn criticism over reports of civilian deaths and the use of excessive force by security personnel. The Human Rights Commission of Pakistan has called for independent inquiries into alleged killings during the May 9 riots and the November 2024 protests, raising concerns over state accountability, human rights violations and the suppression of political dissent. The government has denied that security forces killed protesters.

== Public image ==
During his tenure as chief minister, Sharif developed a reputation as a diligent administrator. He initiated ambitious infrastructure projects in Punjab and was noted for his efficient governance. On 19 December 2016, Vice-Minister Zheng Xiaosong of the International Liaison Department of the Chinese Communist Party coined the term "Shehbaz Speed" to acknowledge his contributions to expediting the progress of projects within the China-Pakistan Economic Corridor. Subsequently, the term has been employed to characterise the rate of advancement within the CPEC. In official meetings, Saudi officials also declared Sharif the "Man of Action."

In 2025, Sharif was recognised among the world's 500 most influential Muslims by The Muslim 500, an annual publication by the Royal Islamic Strategic Studies Centre (RISSC) in Amman, Jordan. In November 2026, Shehbaz and Pakistan's Chief of Defence Forces Asim Munir shared the top ranking on The 500 Most Influential Muslims list compiled by the RISSC, alongside King Salman of Saudi Arabia and Crown Prince Mohammed bin Salman, and Turkish President Recep Tayyip Erdogan.

== Personal life ==
=== Family ===
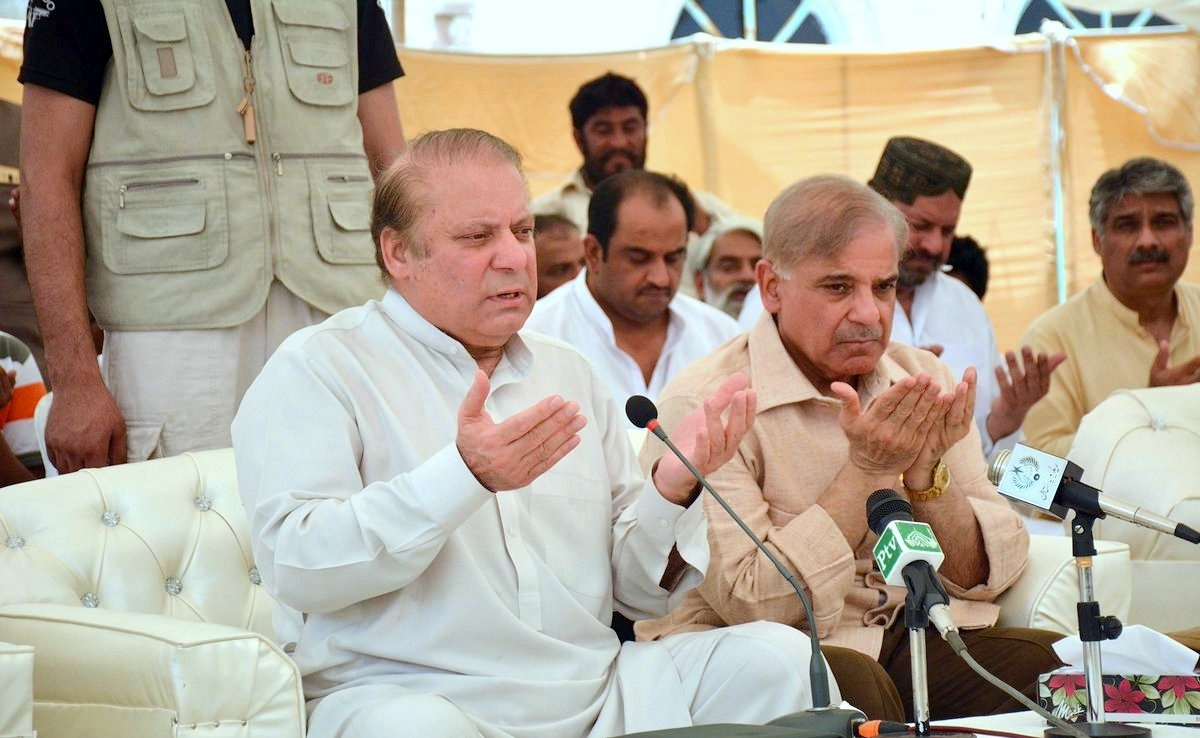
Shehbaz with his elder brother Nawaz Sharif

Sharif married Nusrat Shehbaz in 1973. They had four children: Salman, Hamza, and twin daughters Javeria and Rabia.

His second marriage was to Aaliya Honey, whom he married in 1993. The couple separated after just one year.

In 2003, Sharif married his third wife, author and artist Tehmina Durrani.

=== Wealth ===
His family jointly owns Sharif Group and formerly owned Ittefaq Group. In 2013, it was noted that Shehbaz is wealthier than his elder brother Nawaz with a net worth of Rs. 33.69 crore. (Note: In 2013, US$1 was equivalent to average Rs. 101.583.)

=== Toshakhana records ===
On 12 March 2023, the Government of Pakistan released a record of Toshakhana gifts retained by government officials from 2003 to 2023, 90 gifts were retained by Sharif from Toshakhana.

Toshakhana Gifts	Date	Assessed Market Value	Price Paid
Book from Tehran to Tehran	15 July 2009	a. NCV b. Rs. 7,500/-	---
Carpet in Shopping Bag	15 -07 -2009	Rs.13,000/ –	---
a. Frame box Shield (Large) b. Frame box shield (small) c. Three shields (small)	15 -07 -2009	a. Rs.6,000/ – b. NCV c. NCV	---
One Ceramic Plate (Large)	15 -07 -2009	Rs.4,000/ –	---
a. Book Shahnama – e -Firdous b. 2 Gift Pack in Boxes	15 -07 -2009	a. NCV b. Rs.4,500/	----
One Tower	15 July 2009	NCV	---
One Ceramic Plate (Small)	15 July 2009	Rs.2,500/-	---

== Books ==
- Azm O Himmat Kī Dāstān (عزم و همت كى داستان; "A Tale of Resolve and Courage"), Lāhore: Sharīf Publīcations, 2000, 72 pp. History and struggle of business endeavours of the Sharif family.

== See also ==
- Electoral history of Shehbaz Sharif
- List of current heads of state and government
- List of international prime ministerial trips made by Shehbaz Sharif

== Notes ==
Political offices
Preceded by Mian Muhammad Afzal Hayat; Caretaker	Chief Minister of Punjab; 1997–1999	Vacant Title next held by Chaudhry Pervaiz Elahi
Preceded by Dost Muhammad Khosa	Chief Minister of Punjab; 2008–2013	Succeeded by Najam Sethi; Caretaker
Preceded by Najam Sethi; Caretaker	Chief Minister of Punjab; 2013–2018	Succeeded by Hasan Askari Rizvi; Caretaker
Preceded by Syed Khurshid Ahmed Shah	Leader of the Opposition; 2018–2022	Vacant
Preceded by Imran Khan	Prime Minister of Pakistan; 2022–present	Incumbent
Party political offices
Preceded by Nisar Ali Khan	Leader of the Pakistan Muslim League (N); 2009–2011	Succeeded by Nawaz Sharif
Preceded by Nawaz Sharif	Leader of the Pakistan Muslim League (N); 2018–present	Incumbent
