= Ramzan Sugar Mills =

Pakistani sugar mill company

- Founded: 1992
- Headquarters: Chiniot, Jhang District, Punjab, Pakistan
- Products: Sugar
- Parent: Sharif Group of Companies
- Website: sharifgroup.com.pk

Ramzan Sugar Mills (Urdu: رمضان شوگر ملز) is a Pakistani sugar mill company. It was established by Pakistani businessman Mian Muhammad Sharif in 1992. It is part of the Sharif Group of Companies.

In February 2011, CarboUA tested the plant of Ramzan Sugar Mills and conducted the successful result in March 2011.

== Power project ==
In September 2012, National Electric Power Regulatory Authority (NEPRA) signed on a Co-Generation Power Project agreement with the mill to produce electricity, using industrial waste bagasse of sugarcane, with the capacity of 100 megawatt under the name of Ramzan Energy Ltd.

== Criticism ==
=== NAB Proceedings ===
In 2018, the National Accountability Bureau (NAB) initiated proceedings against then Chief Minister Shehbaz Sharif and his son, Hamza Shahbaz, on allegations that they had inflicted a loss of Rs 213 million to the public exchequer through misuse of authority. They stated that Shehbaz Sharif directed the construction of a drain in Chiniot district for the principal benefit of Ramzan Sugar Mills using public funds.

On October 17, 2024, under Shehbaz Sharif's tenure as the Prime Minister, amendments to the National Accountability Ordinance, 1999 modified NAB's jurisdiction so that the case could no longer be tried by the bureau. The revised law restricted NAB from pursuing cases involving sums below Rs 500 million, while the amount in question in the Ramzan Sugar Mills reference was lower than that threshold.

On February 6, 2025, the anti-corruption court, having reserved its ruling earlier, approved the acquittal applications submitted by Prime Minister Shehbaz Sharif and Hamza Shahbaz.

=== Bridge Construction ===
After the 2014 floods hit Jhang District, politician Imran Khan criticized the mill and an under-construction bridge in Bhawana, claiming in a speech that Sharif group were only constructing the bridge to save their mill not the people. He also claimed that the mill had only paid the farmers 70 percent of the offered price for sugarcane, and that too after one year.

== See also ==
- List of mills in Pakistan
- List of companies of Pakistan
