= Hassan Nawaz =

Hassan Nawaz may refer to:

- Hassan Nawaz Sharif, son of the former prime minister of Pakistan Nawaz Sharif
- Hassan Nawaz (cricketer), Pakistani cricketer
- Hassan Nawaz, a fictional character in the 2012 Indian film Agent Vinod
