= Sharif family =

Pakistani political family

Sharif family شریف خاندان (Urdu)
- Political family
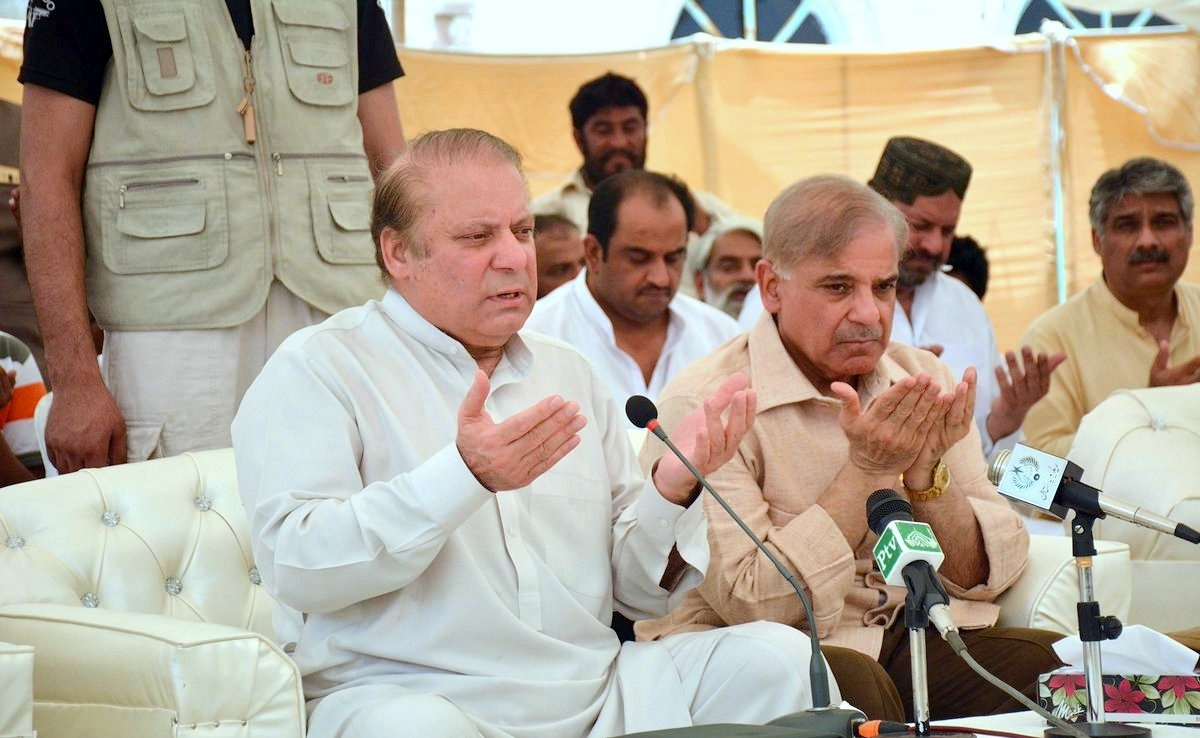
- Nawaz Sharif with Shehbaz Sharif
- Country: Pakistan
- Current region: Lahore, Punjab, Pakistan
- Etymology: Arabic: شريف, 'noble'
- Origin: Jati Umra, Amritsar district, East Punjab; Anantnag, Kashmir Valley
- Founded: 18 November 1919; 106 years ago (Note: With the birth of Mian Muhammad Sharif)
- Founder: Muhammad Sharif
- Current head: Nawaz Sharif
- Seat: Raiwind Palace
- Titles: Mian (male); Sharif
- Styles: His Excellency (for Shahbaz Sharif as prime minister of Pakistan); Her Excellency (for Maryam Nawaz Sharif as chief minister of Punjab)
- Members: Full list: Muhammad Sharif; Shamim Akhtar; Nawaz Sharif; Kulsoom Nawaz; Shehbaz Sharif; Begum Nusrat Shehbaz; Tehmina Durrani; Abbas Sharif; Sabiha Abbas; Hassan Nawaz Sharif; Hussain Nawaz Sharif; Maryam Nawaz Sharif; Asma Nawaz Sharif; Rabia Imran; Hamza Shahbaz Sharif; Suleman Shahbaz Sharif
- Connected members: Full list: Safdar Awan; Abid Sher Ali; The Great Gama; Mohsin Latif; Bilal Yasin
- Connected families: Dar family
- Traditions: Sunni Islam
- Estates: List: Ittefaq Group; Sharif Group; Raiwind Palace; Jati Umra
- Properties: List: Raiwind Palace; Jati Umra
- Website: sharifgroupn.com

The Sharif family (Note: Punjabi: شریف ٹبّر, romanized: Śarīf ṭabbar; Urdu: شریف خاندان, romanized: Śarīf Khāndān) is a Pakistani political family of Punjabi Kashmiri background. They have played a prominent role in Pakistani politics, especially in Punjab, since the 1980s, the family held the leadership of the Islamic Jamhuri Ittihad; and has held the leadership of the Pakistan Muslim League – N (PML–N) for most of the party's existence since 1993.

Originating in the Anantnag region of the Kashmir Valley, the family moved to Amritsar District, Punjab in the 1870s during the British Raj rule and settled in the village of Jati Umra around 1900. Following the partition of India in 1947, the Sharifs moved to the Jati Umra locality of Lahore, which they had named after the village of Amritsar.

The Sharifs belongs to the Bhat tribe and are of Kashmiri Brahmin ancestry. Muhammad Sharif, the father of former Prime Minister of Pakistan Nawaz Sharif, migrated from Jati Umra, Amritsar District (now in Tarn Taran district, India, after the creation of Pakistan in 1947). He was a businessman who founded the Ittefaq Group and Sharif Group in 1939. Sharif's second youngest son, Shehbaz Sharif, is serving as the prime minister of Pakistan since 2024.

== Background ==
The Sharif family were blacksmiths in East Punjab before migrating to Pakistan. Mian Sharif established an iron foundry in Lahore and later founded the Ittefaq Group and Sharif Group. Sharif's son Nawaz Sharif served three terms as Prime Minister of Pakistan, and his other son Shehbaz Sharif has been serving his second term since 2024.

== Family members ==
First Generation

- Khuda Bakhsh Bhat; flower-seller in Amritsar and father of Ramzan Sharif

=== Second Generation ===
- Ramzan Sharif; blacksmith worker; father of Muhammad Sharif

Third Generation

- Mian Sharif, father of Nawaz Sharif and Shehbaz Sharif.
  - Begum Shamim Akhtar, wife of Muhammad Sharif and mother of Nawaz Sharif, Shahbaz Sharif and Abbas Sharif. She died on 22 November 2020.

Fourth Generation

- Nawaz Sharif, Former Prime Minister of Pakistan.
  - Kalsoom Nawaz Sharif, was the wife of Nawaz Sharif. She died in London in 2018 after battling cancer.
- Shehbaz Sharif, Prime Minister of Pakistan and former Chief Minister of Punjab.
  - Begum Nusrat Shahbaz, first wife of Shahbaz Sharif.
  - Tehmina Durrani, second wife of Shahbaz Sharif.
- Abbas Sharif, a Pakistani businessman and brother of Nawaz Sharif and Shabaz Sharif. He died on 11 January 2013, after slipping and falling on an electric heater, which electrocuted him and caused a heart attack.
  - Sabiha Abbas, wife of Abbas Sharif.

Fifth Generation

- Hassan Nawaz Sharif, son of Nawaz Sharif, he lives in London.
- Hussain Nawaz Sharif, son of Nawaz Sharif, a businessman, he resides at the Sharif Villa in Jeddah, Saudi Arabia, where his father lived during his time in exile.
- Maryam Nawaz Sharif, Chief Minister of Punjab daughter of Nawaz Sharif, and is an active politician in Pakistan. She is married to Muhammad Safdar Awan, a former member of Pakistan's national assembly, and captain in the Pakistani army. She ran elections campaigns for Pakistan Muslim League (N) in the 2013 Pakistani general election, and the 2018 Pakistani general election. In July 2018, she was sentenced to seven years in prison, along with a £2 million fine on corruption charges in the Avenfield reference case. On 19 September 2018, the Islamabad High Court suspended her sentence.
- Asma Nawaz Sharif, daughter of Nawaz Sharif.
- Rabia Imran, daughter of Shahbaz Sharif.
- Hamza Shahbaz Sharif, son of Shahbaz Sharif, leader of the Opposition in the Provincial Assembly of the Punjab, Member of the National Assembly
- Suleman Shahbaz, son of Shahbaz Sharif, former CEO of Sharif Group.

=== Other relatives ===
- Safdar Awan, husband of Maryam Nawaz Sharif.
- Abid Sher Ali, nephew of Nawaz Sharif.
- The Great Gama, grandfather of Kulsoom Nawaz.
- Ishaq Dar, father-in-law of Asma Nawaz Sharif.
- Ali Dar, husband of Asma Nawaz Sharif.
- Mohsin Latif, nephew of Kalsoom Nawaz.
- Bilal Yasin, nephew of Kalsoom Nawaz.
- Shaikh Rohale Asghar, grandfather-in-law of Junaid Safdar.

== Wealth ==
The Sharif family owns Ittefaq Group and Sharif Group. The village Jati Umrah in Lahore, is also partially owned by the Sharif family.

According to the book Capitalism's Achilles Heel by Raymond W Baker, former PML-N leader Nawaz Sharif made financial gains of $418 million during his two terms as the Prime Minister of Pakistan.

The book is a report on the corruption done by politics' most dominant mafias/families in history, which includes the Sharif family as well. It talks about how they accumulated their factories, properties and wealth.

== Photos ==
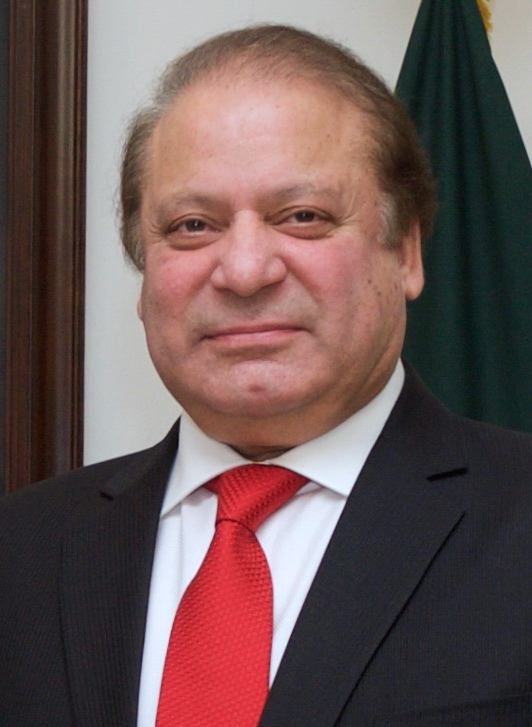
Nawaz Sharif

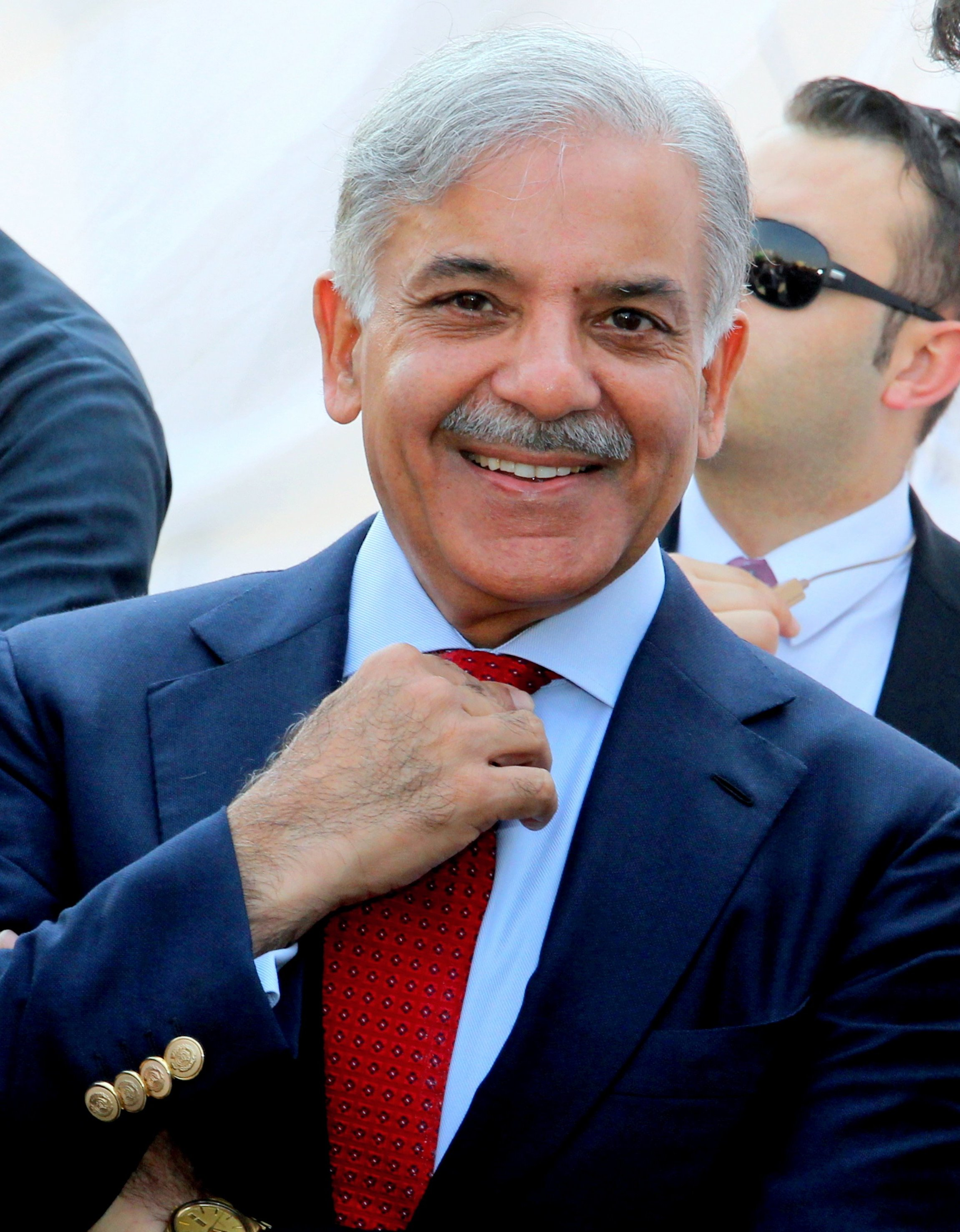
Shehbaz Sharif

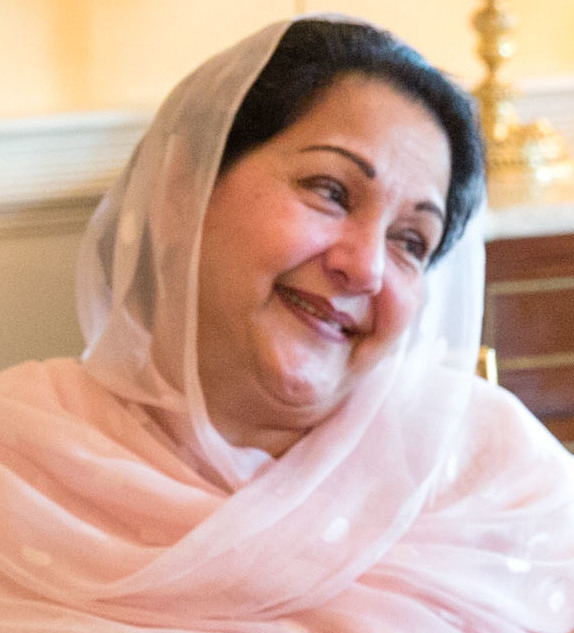
Kalsoom Nawaz Sharif

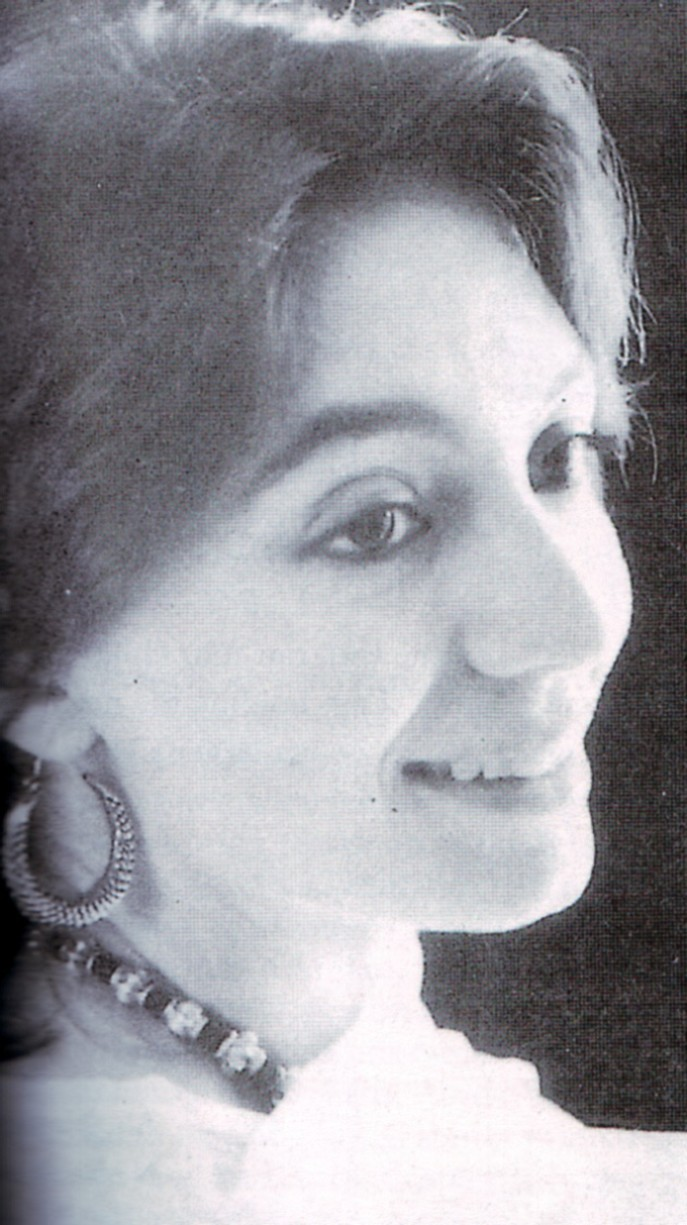
Tehmina Durrani

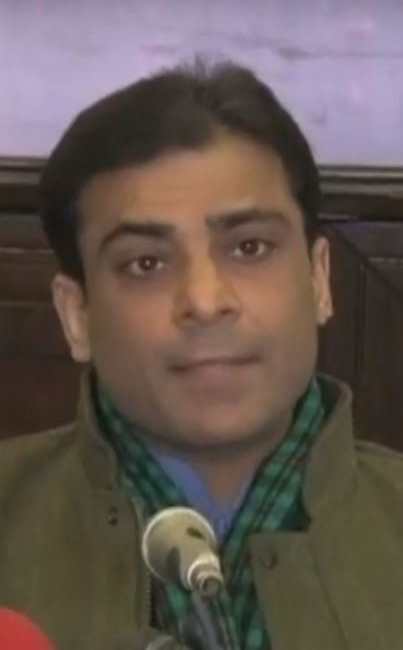
Hamza Shahbaz

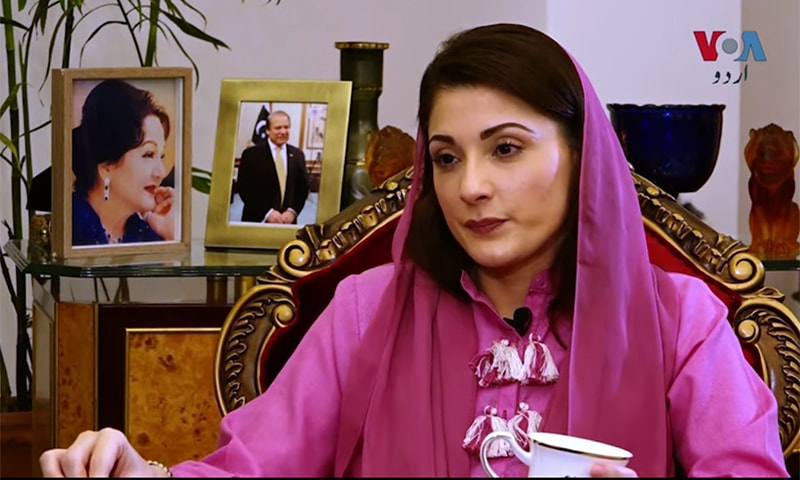
Maryam Nawaz

== See also ==
- List of political families
