= Jati Umra (Lahore) =

Jati Umra جاتی امرا
- Neighbourhood
- Country: Pakistan
- Province: Punjab
- City: Lahore
- Administrative town: Iqbal
- Union council: 124 (Sultanke)

Jati Umra (Punjabi, Urdu: جاتی امرا) is a neighbourhood located within union council 124 (Sultanke) in Iqbal Tehsil of Lahore, Punjab, Pakistan.

== History ==
Jati Umra is Sharif family's palatial estate near Lahore and is named after their Indian ancestral town of Jati Umra, Amritsar district, near Amritsar in Punjab, India. Mian Muhammad Sharif was born and lived in India's Jati Umra before migrating to Lahore in 1932.

== See also ==
- Raiwind Palace
- Sharif College of Engineering and Technology, Lahore
