= Ittefaq =

Ittefaq may refer to:

- The Daily Ittefaq, a Bangladeshi national newspaper in Bengali
- Ittefaq (1969 film), Indian film by Yash Raj Chopra
  - Ittefaq (2017 film), Indian film, remake of the 1969 film
- Ittefaq (2001 film), a Hindi action drama film
- Ittefaq Group, a business group in Pakistan owned by Nawaz Sharif's family
