= Abbas Sharif =

Pakistani politician (1953–2013)

- عباس شریف

Member of the National Assembly of Pakistan
- In office 1993–1997
- Prime Minister: Benazir Bhutto

Personal details
- Born: 4 January 1953 Lahore, Punjab, Pakistan
- Died: 11 January 2013 (aged 60) Lahore, Punjab, Pakistan
- Cause of death: Cardiac arrest
- Party: Pakistan Muslim League (N)
- Spouse: Sabiha Abbas
- Children: 4
- Relatives: Sharif family

Mian Abbas Sharif (4 January 1953 – 11 January 2013) was a Pakistani politician and Tablighi Jamaat missionary who was the Member of the National Assembly of Pakistan from 1993 to 1997. He was the younger brother of Prime Ministers of Pakistan, Nawaz Sharif and Shehbaz Sharif.

== Early life ==
Abbas was born on 4 January 1953 in Lahore, Pakistan into the Punjabi-speaking Sharif family. His father, Muhammad Sharif, was a businessman and industrialist whose family had emigrated from Anantnag in Kashmir for business, and eventually settled in the village of Jati Umra in Amritsar district, Punjab, at the beginning of the twentieth century. His mother's family came from Pulwama. Following the partition of India and Pakistan's independence in 1947, his parents migrated from Amritsar to Lahore. His two brothers were Nawaz Sharif (a three-time former Prime Minister of Pakistan), and Shehbaz Sharif (the 23rd and current Prime Minister of Pakistan), and his niece, Maryam Nawaz is the 19th and currect Chief Minister of Punjab.

== Political career ==
He was elected as the member of the National Assembly of Pakistan in the by-polls of the 1993 Pakistani general election.

== Personal life ==
Sharif was married to Sabiha Abbas. They had two sons, Aziz and Yousuf, and two daughters, Salma and Sara.

== Death ==
Abbas died on 11 January 2013 at the age of 60 of a cardiac arrest after getting electrocuted.
