= Jati Umra (Amritsar) =

Coordinates: 31°29′N 75°05′E

- Village
- Interactive map of Jati Umra
- Country: India
- State: Punjab
- District: Amritsar

Jati Umra is a small village located approximately 40 kilometres (25 mi) from Amritsar city in the Amritsar district of the Indian state of Punjab.

== History ==
Jati Umra is notable for being the ancestral village of the Sharif family of Pakistan. Muhammad Sharif, who later become a well-known businessman, and founded the Ittefaq Group and Sharif Group, belonged to Jati Umra. He left India and moved to Lahore, Pakistan in 1947. Two of his three sons, Nawaz and Shehbaz later became the Prime Ministers of Pakistan. In December 2013, the then Chief Minister of Punjab, Shehbaz Sharif, during his visit to India, went to the grave of his great-grandfather Mian Mohammad Baksh at the village and offered a holy sheet. The family named the area surrounding their Lahore residence, Raiwind Palace, Jati Umra, after their ancestral village.
