= Sharif College of Engineering and Technology, Lahore =

Engineering college

Sharif College of Engineering and Technology (SCET) is a college located in Sharif Medical City, in the Jati Umra neighborhood of Lahore, Punjab, Pakistan.

It was founded in 2010, as a project of Sharif Trust, a nonprofit organization formed in 1995 under the Societies Registration Act of 1860.

SCET is affiliated with the University of Engineering and Technology, Lahore. The college offers three degree programs: 1. B.Sc Chemical Engineering 2. B.Sc Electrical Engineering 3. B.Sc Computer Sciences. Since the time of its founding, students of this college have participated in national and international competitions.
