= Raiwind Palace =

- Interactive map of the Raiwind Palace area
- Alternative names: Raiwind Farm House

General information
- Status: In use
- Type: Palace
- Architectural style: Indo-Saracenic
- Location: Raiwind, Lahore
- Coordinates: 31.331242°N 74.203717°E
- Current tenants: Sharif family
- Owner: Sharif family

Raiwind Palace (Urdu: رائے ونڈ محل) is a palace located in Lahore, Pakistan. It is spread over 1700 acres and is the main residence of the Sharif family.

== History ==
The construction of Raiwind Palace was started in 1997 and was completed within a span of 17 months. It was built in mediterranean-style with at least twenty-two rooms. During the premiership of Nawaz Sharif, Raiwind Palace was declared as the Prime Minister's camp office.

In October 1999, Nawaz Sharif was about to move to this newly built palace but was removed from power in a military coup.

In 2014, it was reported that the palace was owned by Shamim Sharif, the mother of Nawaz and Shehbaz Sharif.

In 2019, Ijaz Ahmed Shah, former Interior Minister of Pakistan, claimed that 280 million rupees were withdrawn from the national exchequer and spent by the Sharif family to build Raiwind Palace.

== Architecture ==
The Raiwind Palace compound encompasses four marble-faced villas surrounded by expansive lawns and hundreds of acres of wheat fields. During the harvest season, farmworkers can be observed collecting ripe corn from these fields. The palace also includes a private zoo, which houses deers, a herd of antelopes, and a large turkey. Taxidermied leopards are displayed outside the main entrance of the palace.

The interior of the palace features marble flooring in various colors, including pink, green, and blue. The ceilings are decorated with hand-painted rose friezes, while the floors are made of inlaid oak. The walls are covered with panels of silk fabrics, and the rococo chairs are heavily gilded. The central hall includes an atrium with a skylight, where two taxidermied lions are displayed on platforms. Artificial floral arrangements are attached to the edges of the marble staircase, which leads to the second floor containing private rooms. Access to the private quarters is restricted.
