= Reema Omer =

Pakistani lawyer and news analyst

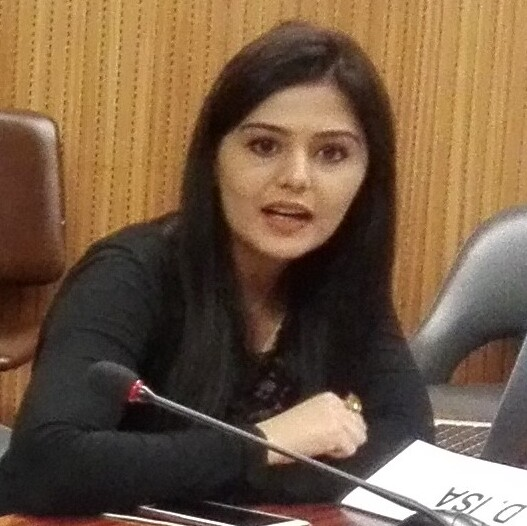
- Born: 3 June 1986 (age 40); Lahore, Punjab, Pakistan
- Education: LLB, Lahore University of Management Sciences (Pakistan); LLM, University of Cambridge (UK)
- Occupations: Lawyer; Human rights activist Analyst & columnist
- Organization: International Commission of Jurists

Reema Omer (Urdu: ریما عمر; born 3 June 1986) is a Pakistani lawyer, human rights professional and news analyst. She is currently working as a legal adviser for the International Commission of Jurists. She is a visiting faculty member at Lahore School of Law. She regularly writes her opinion on the legal landscape and human rights issues in Pakistan, and contributes her legal and political analysis in current affairs shows on different news channels.

== Early life and education ==
Reema, one of two children, was born and raised in Lahore, Punjab. She was educated at Lahore Grammar School, where she completed her O' Level in 2002 and got a world distinction in A' Level law in 2004. She did her BA-LL.B from Lahore University of Management Sciences in 2009, where she was awarded a gold medal for the best student. Later, she did an LLM specializing in Public International Law in 2010 from the University of Cambridge, UK. Reema is married to Dr. Ali Jan and has one daughter.

== Career ==
In 2011, Reema joined the International Commission of Jurists as its South Asia consultant. She served as the ICJ's International Legal Advisor for Pakistan from 2013 to 2018, and as the ICJ's Senior International Legal Advisor for South Asia from 2018 to 2025. Today, she is leading ICJ work on the independence of judges and lawyers.

She has been appointed amicus curiae by the Supreme Court of Pakistan and the High Court on key constitutional and human rights cases. She regularly participates as a legal and political analyst in current affairs shows on various news channels. She frequently contributes articles to several online and print newspapers on the themes relating to human rights such as the rule of law, freedom of expression, social justice, access to justice, gender disparity in the legal sector, Pakistan's international commitments, and national human rights institutions. Her contributions as opinion-writer to Dawn, Geo News, The News, Daily Times, and The Friday Times serve to increase understanding about the legal lacunas in national laws, and provide ways forward to address the human rights issues that exist in Pakistan.

== Report Card ==
Reema Omer regularly appears as an analyst along with leading analysts and opinion makers comprising Suhail Warraich, Mazhar Abbas, Hassan Nisar, Benazir Shah, Shahzad Iqbal, Muneeb Farooq, Ather Kazmi and Irshad Hameed, on the current affairs talk show of the Geo News called "Report Card" wherein she presents her opinion and analysis on legal matters and political situation in Pakistan.

== Aurat Card ==
Reema Omer, along with female journalists Benazir Shah, Mehmal Sarfaraz and Natasha Zai, created a YouTube show called "Aurat Card" to give women a platform to voice out their concerns and share their perspective. They discuss the variety of topics and issues they have expertise and interest in particularly related to politics, law, sports or entertainment. They analyze current affairs, review movies and dramas, and review different products of use.

== Intimidation and harassment ==
In 2019, Twitter sent a notice to Reema Omer that her tweets questioning the procedures of military courts, were in violation of the Constitution of Pakistan. However, then Federal Minister for Information Fawad Chaudhry denied the government's involvement in submitting an official correspondence to Twitter against Reema's in tweets.

In 2020, Reema along with other female journalists appeared before the National Assembly's standing committee on human rights and requested its Chairman Bilawal Bhutto Zardari and the members to address the incidents of sexual harassment that female journalists and analysts have to face on Twitter. Having heard the accounts, the Federal Minister for Human Rights, Shireen Mazari condemned the harassment of female journalists and promised to take action against the persons involved in online harassment.

The Coalition for Women in Journalism also condemned the persistent trolling by PTI supports who criticize Reema Omer's critical stance on the current state of affairs in Pakistan.

== Publications ==
Omer contributed to several publications especially briefing papers and reports relating to human rights and access to justice in Pakistan.

1. Briefing Paper on Military Justice in Pakistan: A Glaring Surrender of Human Rights
2. Authority without accountability: The search for justice in Pakistan
3. Briefing Paper on Violations of the Right to Freedom of Religion or Belief in Pakistan
4. Briefing Paper on Transgender Persons (Protection of Rights) Act, 2018
5. Briefing Paper on Entrenching Impunity, Denying Redress: The Commission of Inquiry on Enforced Disappearances in Pakistan
6. On Trial: The Implementation of Pakistan's Blasphemy Laws
7. Briefing Paper on Challenges to Freedom of Religion or Belief in Myanmar
8. Briefing Paper on Challenges to Freedom of Religion or Belief in Nepal
9. Report on The Criminalization of Enforced Disappearance in South Asia

== Awards and recognition ==
She was awarded the Commonwealth Pegasus scholarship in 2010 where she worked in barristers' chambers in London on human rights cases.
