= Mohsin Latif =

Pakistani politician

Mohsin Latif MPA

Member of the Provincial Assembly of the Punjab
- In office 2008–2015

Personal details
- Born: Lahore, Pakistan
- Party: Pakistan Muslim League (Nawaz)
- Relations: Kulsoom Nawaz Sharif (aunt)
- Children: 2

Mian Mohsin Latif is a Pakistani politician who was a member of the Provincial Assembly of the Punjab between 2008 and 2015.

== Early life ==
He was born in Lahore to Mian Abdul Latif, brother of Kulsoom Nawaz Sharif. He graduated from Forman Christian College in 1992.

He is thus a great grandson of the legendary Gama Pehlwan & grandson of Dr. Abdul Hafeez of Misri Shah, Lahore who ran a dispensary from 1938 to 1999. In 2018, Mohsin Latif opened a dispensary free to the public at the same location in memory of his father & grandfather.

== Political career ==
He was elected from PP-147 – Lahore as a candidate of Pakistan Muslim League (Nawaz) (PML-N) in 2008 Pakistani general election. He was subsequently re-elected in the 2013 2013 Pakistani general election and was MPA until the 2015 by-election.

== Business career ==
Mohsin Latif is an interior designer by profession & runs Touchwood Interiors (based at 14 Shadman behind Soneri Bank on Jail Road, Lahore).
