= Mian Sharif =

Pakistani businessman (1918–2004)

- Sharif in 2000
- Born: 2 August 1919; Jati Umra, British India
- Died: 19 October 2004 (aged 85–86); Jeddah, Saudi Arabia
- Resting place: Raiwind, Lahore, Pakistan
- Occupation: Businessman
- Political party: PMLN (2000—2004)
- Spouse: Shamim Akhtar
- Children: 3
- Relatives: Sharif family

Mian Muhammad Sharif (Punjabi, Urdu: میاں محمد شریف; 18 November 1918/1919 – 19 October 2004) was a Pakistani businessman who is known as the co-founder of Ittefaq Group and founder of Sharif Group. Two of his three sons, Nawaz Sharif and Shehbaz Sharif, later became the Prime Ministers of Pakistan.

== Early life and family ==
Sharif was born in 1918/1919. After the Partition of British India in August 1947, he and his six brothers migrated to Lahore and settled in Gowal Mandi. They set up an iron-melting furnace in Landa bazaar, Lahore. In 1939,Sharif founded a small steel foundry on the Brandreth Road after selling his ancestral farming land.

He was married to Shamim Akhtar, with whom he had three sons. All his children became politicians, Nawaz Sharif, Shehbaz Sharif and Abbas Sharif.

In 1985, he used his relations with President General Zia-ul-Haq to get his son, Nawaz Sharif, appointed as the Chief Minister of Punjab.

== Arrest ==
In November 1994, he was arrested by Pakistani police for tax evasion of $2 million.

== Death ==
In 2000, Sharif's family was exiled to Saudi Arabia by then Chief of Army Staff Pervez Musharraf. He died of a cardiac arrest in Jeddah, in 19 October 2004, at the age of 84. Sharif was suffering from chronic heart disease and underwent angioplasty twice. In 1982, he had his first heart bypass. His funeral took place in Masjid al-Haram on 30 October 2004. He is buried in Raiwind, Allama Iqbal Town, Lahore.
