= Sharif Group =

Pakistani agricultural conglomerate company

Sharif Group of Companies
- Industry: Sugar, Bird feeding
- Founded: 1964
- Founder: Mian Muhammad Sharif
- Headquarters: Lahore, Pakistan
- Total assets: ▲US $300 million
- Subsidiaries: Ramzan Sugar Mills; Sharif Feed; Ramzan Sugar Cane Development Farm
- Website: www.sharifgroupn.com

The Sharif Group of Companies is a Pakistani agricultural conglomerate company based in Lahore, Pakistan. It was established in 1974 by Pakistani businessman Mian Muhammad Sharif.

The Sharif Group assets are valued at US $300 million approximately.

== Subsidiaries ==
Subsidiaries of Sharif Group are:

=== Sharif Feed ===
The feed operates on 25 acres of land. It is one of the major players in Pakistani bird feed industry.

=== Ramzan Sugar Cane Development Farm ===
It was established in 2005 and is currently directed by Suleman Shehbaz Sharif. To develop sugar cane, 600 acres of land was acquired by the group.

== See also ==
- Ittefaq Group
- List of companies of Pakistan
