= Ittefaq Group =

Steel manufacturer

Ittefaq Foundries
- Type: Construction and Metallurgy
- Industry: Material science and Metallurgical Engineering
- Genre: Commercial; Public
- Founded: 1951; 75 years ago
- Founder: Mian Barkat Ali; Mian Muhammad Siraj; Mian Muhammad Bashir; Mian Abdul Aziz; Mian Muhammad Shafi; Mian Meraj Din
- Defunct: 2004
- Fate: Acquired by Al-Rehmat Group
- Successor: Al-Rehmat Group
- Headquarters: Lahore, Pakistan
- Area served: Pakistan
- Key people: Mian Muhammad Sharif; Chairman
- Products: Hot rolled steel Products; Billets; Cold rolled steel Products; Galvanised steel Products; Electronic materials
- Services: Production of Iron and Steel

Ittefaq Foundries was a Pakistani industrial equipment manufacturer with interests in sugar, steel and textiles headquartered in Lahore. It was founded in 1951 by the Sharif family. At its peak, it was a manufacturer of diesel engines up to 200 hp, lathes, road rollers, sugar mills, cement plants, agricultural equipment, and electric fans.

== History ==
Ittefaq Foundries was founded by seven brothers in 1939 as a small foundry. Among the founders, the major contributions were made by the brothers Mian Barkat Ali and Muhammad Sharif. The total investment in the plant was estimated to be at Rs. 15 million in 1966. The word Ittefaq means Unity in English language (implying unity among the 7 founding brothers).

Muhammad Sharif initially set up an iron-melting furnace in Lahore and quickly expanded this business in the early years of Pakistan.

By 1971, Ittefaq Foundry had made a notable presence in the steel industry in Pakistan. In 1972, Prime Minister Zulfikar Ali Bhutto nationalized the steel industry, including Ittefaq family steel division.

In 1978, Zia ul-Haq returned the business to Ittefaq family after developing political links with the Sharifs. In 1983, Zia ul-Haq appointed Nawaz Sharif as finance minister in the Punjab provincial cabinet. Then after the Pakistani general election, 1988, Nawaz Sharif formed and headed the provincial government in Punjab. In November 1990, Nawaz Sharif became the Prime Minister of Pakistan for the first time.

In 2004, the Ittefaq Group steel division was acquired by Al-Rehmat Group of Companies of Faisalabad for Rs. 2.159 billion. The sell-out was called by the Lahore High Court to pay up the loan which Ittefaq Group steel division had taken between 1982 and 1988.

Upon the plea of family of Mian Mehraj Din (one of the seven brothers who set up Ittefaq Group and founder of Haseeb Waqas Group of Companies) that the evaluation of assets is wrong Ittefaq Foundry was finally sold out to Al-Rehmat Group for Rs. 6 billion.

== Loan defaults ==
Ittefaq Foundries opened a credit account with the National Bank of Pakistan's Wapda House branch in Lahore in August 1979, initially obtaining a facility of Rs 17.5 million. Following Mian Nawaz Sharif's appointment as Finance Minister of Punjab by Muhammad Zia-ul-Haq, the credit limit increased to Rs 30 million and further expanded to Rs 200 million when Sharif became the provincial chief minister. Despite accruing no markup payments until 1988-89, the credit facility was subsequently raised to Rs 288.177 million.

In November 1991, the foundry secured increase by mortgaging assets valued at Rs 359.88 million. However, the company defaulted on payments, leading the credit amount to escalate to Rs 574.673 million by the mid-1990s.

In June 1993, Ittefaq Foundries utilized a letter of credit for Rs 310 million to import shredded steel scrap from the U.S., paying only five percent of its value.

== Ittefaq Foundries reference case ==
On February 14, 2000, the National Accountability Bureau (NAB) filed a reference against the owners of Ittefaq Foundries, including Mian Muhammad Sharif, Nawaz Sharif, and Shahbaz Sharif, for failing to repay a loan of PKR 1.06 billion owed to the National Bank of Pakistan (NBP). This followed a complaint lodged on December 10, 1999, by the bank's zonal chief and manager at Wapda House, stating that the company had defaulted on payments since 1994. Despite Nawaz Sharif's 1998 pledge to liquidate assets to settle his family's debts, a significant liability remained. Following the military coup in 1999, Nawaz Sharif was exiled, complicating recovery efforts. NAB arrested Mukhtar Hussain, a director of Ittefaq Foundries and a named guarantor for the loan. His arrest was contested in the LHC, which eventually ordered his release—a decision later challenged by NAB in the Supreme Court of Pakistan.

In 2012, NAB informed the Lahore High Court (LHC) that the Sharif family had defaulted on loans totaling Rs 3.8 billion. By December 2011, the family's outstanding debts included Rs 2.31 billion owed to the NBP, Rs 336 million to Habib Bank Limited, Rs 343 million to United Bank Limited, Rs 456.1 million to Muslim Commercial Bank, Rs 202 million to First Punjab Modaraba, Rs 95 million to Bank of Punjab, Rs 60 million to Zarai Taraqiati Bank Limited (ZTBL), Rs 27 million to NIB Bank (formerly PICIC), and Rs 8 million to the International Commercial Bank of Pakistan (ICBP).

In November 2014, after 15 years, the Supreme Court revisited the case. During the proceedings, NAB's counsel argued that the LHC's ruling hindered ongoing corruption investigations and pushed for its reversal, citing legal precedents that supported cases against guarantors of defaulted loans.

In May 2015, Judge Sohail Nasir of the Accountability Court in Rawalpindi acquitted Nawaz Sharif, Shehbaz Sharif, and other family members in the Ittefaq Foundries case. The court dismissed the National Accountability Bureau's plea to reopen the investigation, citing that the matter had been resolved with the National Bank of Pakistan. The judge noted that the allegations against the foundry appeared to be politically motivated and confirmed that there were no outstanding disputes between the Sharif family and the bank.
