= Nawaz Sharif =

Prime Minister of Pakistan (1990–1993; 1997–1999; 2013–2017)

- نواز شریف
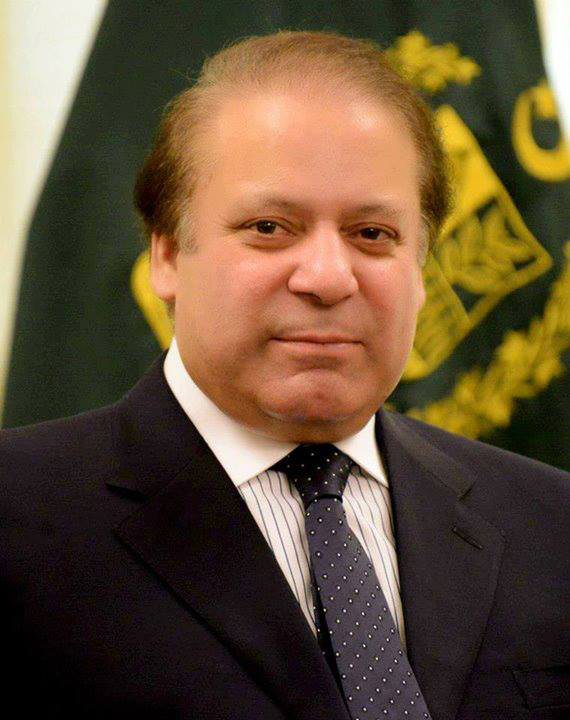
- Official portrait, c. 2013

Prime Minister of Pakistan
- In office 5 June 2013 – 28 July 2017
- President: Asif Ali Zardari; Mamnoon Hussain
- Preceded by: Mir Hazar Khan Khoso (caretaker)
- Succeeded by: Shahid Khaqan Abbasi
- In office 17 February 1997 – 12 October 1999
- President: Farooq Leghari; Wasim Sajjad (acting); Rafiq Tarar
- Preceded by: Malik Meraj Khalid (caretaker)
- Succeeded by: Pervez Musharraf (as Chief Executive)
- In office 6 November 1990 – 18 July 1993
- President: Ghulam Ishaq Khan
- Preceded by: Ghulam Mustafa Jatoi (caretaker)
- Succeeded by: Moeenuddin Ahmad Qureshi (caretaker)

Leader of the Opposition
- In office 19 October 1993 – 5 November 1996
- Prime Minister: Benazir Bhutto
- Preceded by: Benazir Bhutto
- Succeeded by: Benazir Bhutto

President of Pakistan Muslim League (N)
- Incumbent
- Assumed office 28 May 2024
- Preceded by: Shehbaz Sharif
- In office 27 July 2011 – 13 March 2018
- Preceded by: Javed Hashmi
- Succeeded by: Sardar Yaqoob (interim)
- In office 6 October 1993 – 12 October 1999
- Preceded by: Office established
- Succeeded by: Kulsoom Nawaz

9th Chief Minister of Punjab
- In office 9 April 1985 – 13 August 1990
- Governor: Ghulam Jilani Khan; Sajjad Hussain Qureshi; Tikka Khan
- Preceded by: Sadiq Hussain Qureshi
- Succeeded by: Ghulam Haider Wyne

Member of the National Assembly
- Incumbent
- Assumed office 29 February 2024
- Preceded by: Waheed Alam Khan
- Constituency: NA-130 Lahore-XIV
- In office 1 June 2013 – 28 July 2017
- Preceded by: Bilal Yasin
- Succeeded by: Kulsoom Nawaz
- Constituency: NA-120 Lahore-III
- In office 3 November 1990 – 12 October 1999
- Constituency: NA-95 Lahore-IV

Member of the Provincial Assembly
- In office 1980–1990
- Constituency: PP-105 Lahore-XII

Personal details
- Born: Muhammad Nawaz Sharif; 25 December 1949 (age 76) Lahore, Punjab, Pakistan
- Party: PML-N (1993–present)
- Other political affiliations: PML-J (1976–1988); IDA (1988–1993)
- Spouse: Kulsoom Nawaz (m. 1971; died 2018)
- Children: 4 including Maryam Nawaz
- Relatives: Sharif family
- Education: Govt. College University; University of the Punjab
- Nawaz's voice Nawaz speaking at the Connect Asia-Pacific 2013 Summit; Recorded November 20, 2013

Mian Muhammad Nawaz Sharif (Note: Punjabi, Urdu: میاں محمد نواز شریف) (born 25 December 1949) is a Pakistani politician and businessman who thrice served as the prime minister of Pakistan, from 1990 to 1993, from 1997 to 1999 and later from 2013 to 2017. He is the longest-serving prime minister in the country's history, having served a total of more than 9 years across three tenures, with each term ending in his ousting. He has also served twice as the chief minister of Punjab and has held several ministerial positions at the provincial and federal levels, as well as the leader of the opposition. He remains a prominent figure in Pakistani politics and is a leading member of the Pakistan Muslim League (N).

Born into the Sharif family in Lahore, Punjab, Nawaz is the son of businessman Muhammad Sharif, the founder of Ittefaq and Sharif groups. Nawaz studied business at Government College and law at the University of Punjab. Nawaz entered into politics in 1981, when he was appointed by President Zia as the minister of finance for the province of Punjab. Backed by a loose coalition of conservatives, Nawaz was elected as the chief minister of Punjab in 1985 and re-elected after the end of martial law in 1988.

Before the 1990 election, Nawaz was appointed as the head of the conservative Islami Jamhuri Ittihad, founded by Lt General Hamid Gul, and became the 12th prime minister of Pakistan with the help of Generals Mirza Aslam Beg, Asad Durrani, and drug barons such as Haji Ayub Afridi. After being ousted in 1993, when President Ghulam Ishaq Khan dissolved the National Assembly, Nawaz served as the leader of the opposition to the government of Benazir Bhutto from 1993 to 1996. He returned to the premiership after the Pakistan Muslim League (N) (PML-N) was elected in 1997, and served until his removal in 1999 by military takeover by General Pervez Musharraf. Imprisoned and subject to trial after the coup, Sharif avoided the death penalty as a result of pressure from US president Bill Clinton. He struck a deal with the military establishment, which was brokered by King Fahd of Saudi Arabia, and went into exile for a period of ten years. In 2007, he violated the agreement and attempted to return but was deported.

After more than a decade, he returned to politics in 2011 and led his party to victory for the third time in 2013. In 2017, Nawaz was again removed from office by the Supreme Court of Pakistan following the Panama Papers case. In 2018, the Pakistani Supreme Court disqualified Nawaz from holding public office, and he was also sentenced to ten years in prison by an accountability court. In 2019, he went to London for medical treatment on bail. He was declared an absconder by a Pakistani court for his failure to return in four weeks; however, the Islamabad High Court later granted him protective bail in the Avenfield and Al-Azizia cases. In 2023, after four years of exile, he returned to Pakistan and was subsequently acquitted in the Avenfield and Al-Azizia Steel Mills cases by the Islamabad High Court.

He has been a member of the National Assembly of Pakistan since 29 February 2024. Sharif's victory in NA-130, which is widely regarded as one of Pakistan's most competitive constituencies, has been called into question. An examination of Form 45 conducted by the Pattan Development Organisation and an investigation by Geo TV's Election Cell showed manipulated vote counts, altered turnout statistics, and modified official documents which substantiated claims by the opposition that the election result was tampered with. The evidence suggests the election was rigged in Sharif's favour, undermining the legitimate victory of his opponent Yasmin Rashid. He has been serving as Patron-in-Chief of the Lahore Authority for Heritage Revival since 2025.

== Early life and education ==
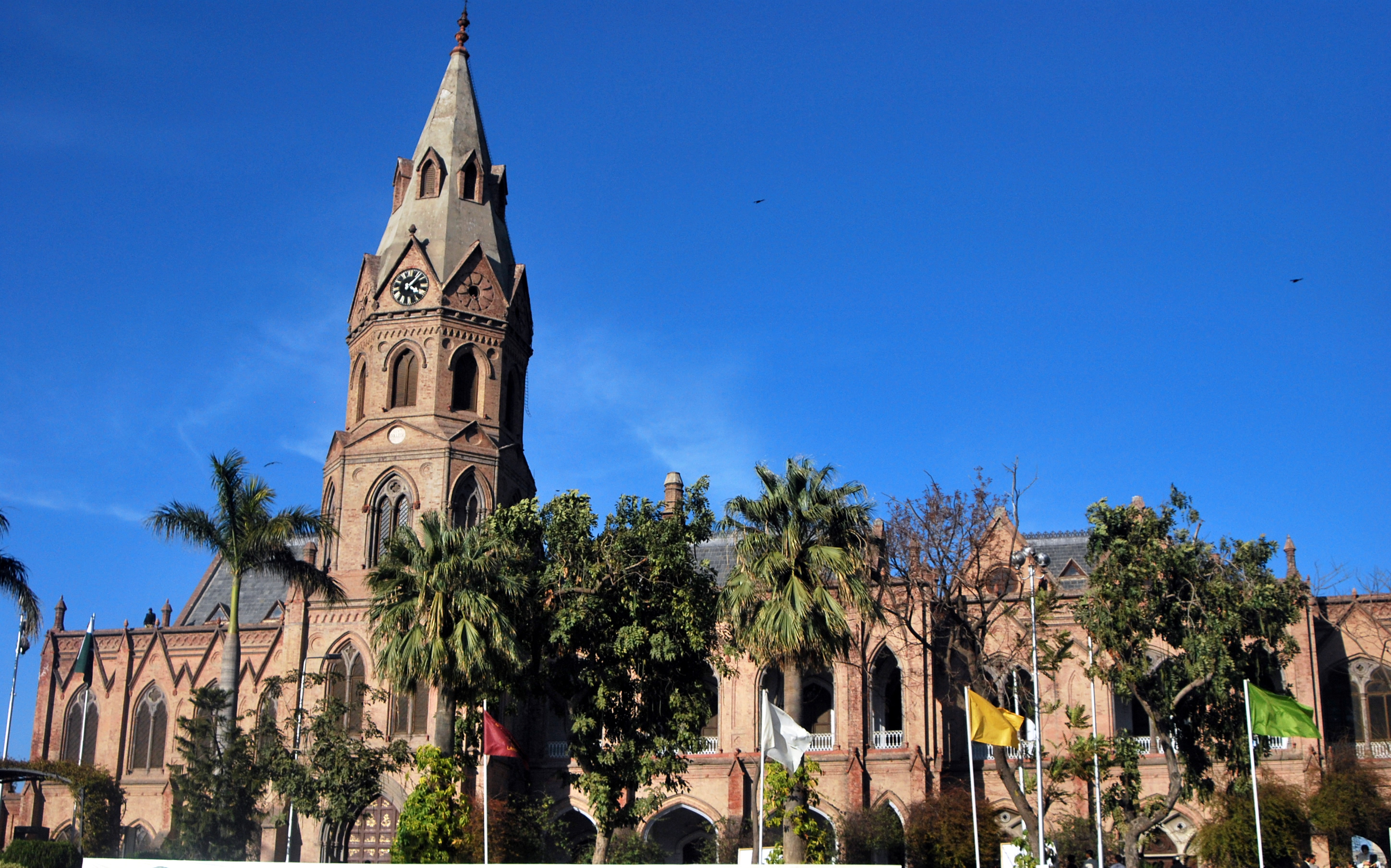
Government College, Lahore, where Sharif studied business

Nawaz was born in Lahore, Punjab, on 25 December 1949. The Sharif family are Punjabi-speaking Kashmiris. His father, Muhammad Sharif, was described as a "shrewd" businessman and industrialist whose family had emigrated from Anantnag in Kashmir for business. They settled in the village of Jati Umra in Amritsar district, Punjab, at the beginning of the twentieth century. His mother's family came from Pulwama. After the creation of Pakistan in 1947, Nawaz's parents migrated from Amritsar to Lahore. His father followed the teachings of the Ahl-i Hadith. Though the Sharif family are known to have strong Barelvi thoughts. His family owns Ittefaq Group, a multimillion-dollar steel conglomerate, and Sharif Group, a conglomerate with holdings in agriculture, transport and sugar mills. He has two younger brothers: Shehbaz Sharif and the late Abbas Sharif, both of whom are politicians.

Nawaz went to Saint Anthony High School. He was admitted into the Government College, Lahore on the basis of his skill in Kushti, a type of wrestling. He graduated with an art and business degree and then received a law degree from the Law College of Punjab University in Lahore.

Nawaz attempted to play cricket in 1973 but was dismissed for a duck on the first ball he faced while playing for the Railways team against Pakistan International Airlines.

Imran Khan in his book, Pakistan: A Personal History, recalled an incident before a 1987 Cricket World Cup warm-up match against the West Indies at Gaddafi Stadium. "A few moments before the match started, the cricket board secretary told me that the Chief Minister of Punjab, Nawaz Sharif, would be captaining the team that day," he observed. Although he thought he would not play, Imran was shocked to see that Sharif had walked out to do the toss with Viv Richards in full cricket whites and a cricket helmet. Sharif insisted to open the batting. Although Mudassar Nazar was completely ready in protective cricket gear, Sharif was ready to bat with pads, a floppy hat, and "a smile." Imran, concerned for Sharif's safety against the West Indies' formidable pace attack, asked if an ambulance was ready. The match was played on 4 October in 1987. After five bouncers against him, the bowler bowled the sixth ball, which knocked his stumps over as it went through. "The CM was stupefied and most reluctant to leave the ground," Ramiz Raja recalled.

== Political career in Punjab ==
=== Early political career ===
Nawaz faced considerable financial challenges when his family's steel business was affected by the nationalisation policies implemented by former Prime Minister Zulfikar Ali Bhutto. This experience prompted him to pursue a career in politics, where he initially focused on the objective of restoring control over the steel plants that were significant to his family. In the late 1970s, he joined Asghar Khan's Tehreek-e-Istiqlal, which was a notable political movement at the time. According to Sharif, he was appointed as Finance Minister of Punjab in General Zia ul-Haq's regime due to the efforts of then Brigadier Abdul Qayyum. By 1976, Nawaz also became a member of the Pakistan Muslim League (PML), a conservative party with deep roots in the Punjab province, contributing to the political landscape of the region.

In May 1980, Ghulam Jilani Khan, the recently appointed military governor of Punjab and a former Director-General of the Inter-Services Intelligence (ISI), was seeking new urban leaders; he quickly promoted Nawaz, making him finance minister. In 1981, Nawaz joined the Punjab Advisory Council under Khan.

During the 1980s, Nawaz gained influence as a supporter of General Zia-ul-Haq's military government. Zia-ul-Haq agreed to return the steel industry to Nawaz, who convinced the general to denationalise and deregulate industries to improve the economy. Within Punjab, Nawaz privatised government-owned industries and presented development-oriented budgets to the military government. These policies raised financial capital and helped increase the standard of living and purchasing power in the province, which in turn improved law and order and extended Khan's rule. Punjab was the richest province and received more federal funding than the other provinces of Pakistan, contributing to economical inequality.

Nawaz invested in Saudi Arabia and other oil-rich Arab countries to rebuild his steel empire. According to personal accounts and his time spent with Nawaz, American historian Stephen P. Cohen states in his 2004 book Idea of Pakistan: "Nawaz Sharif never forgave Bhutto after his steel empire was lost [...] even after [Bhutto's] terrible end, Nawaz publicly refused to forgive the soul of Bhutto or the Pakistan Peoples Party."

=== Chief Minister of Punjab ===
In 1985, Khan nominated Nawaz as Chief Minister of Punjab, against the wishes of Prime Minister Muhammad Khan Junejo. With the backing of the army, Nawaz secured a landslide victory in the 1985 elections. Because of his popularity, he received the nickname "Lion of the Punjab". Nawaz built ties with the senior army generals who sponsored his government. He maintained an alliance with General Rahimuddin Khan, Chairman Joint Chiefs of Staff Committee. Nawaz also had close ties with Lieutenant-General Hamid Gul, the Director-General of ISI.

Pakistani politician Bushra Rahman told Herald: "It is the army that parachuted Nawaz Sharif into politics and made him the youngest chief minister of Punjab," adding, "General Ziaul Haq wished for his own years of life [to be] added to Nawaz Sharif's." She further said, "Governor [Lieutenant General] Ghulam Jillani was asked to nurture him as a politician and to prepare him for national politics." She continued, "We stood by Nawaz Sharif and watched him rise to the highest seat of power in the 1990s, propped up against Benazir Bhutto."

In 1988, General Zia dismissed the government of Junejo and called for new elections. However, Zia retained Nawaz as the Chief Minister of Punjab, and until his death, continued to support Nawaz.

== 1988 elections ==
After General Zia's death in August 1988, his political party – Pakistan Muslim League – split into two factions. Nawaz led the Zia-loyalist Fida Group against the Prime Minister's Junejo's Pakistan Muslim League (J). The Fida Group later took on the mantle of the PML while the Junejo Group became known as the JIP. The two parties along with seven other right-wing conservative and religious parties united with encouragement and funding from the ISI to form the Islami Jamhuri Ittihad (IJI). The IJI received ₨15 million from Zia loyalists in the ISI, with a substantial role played by Nawaz's ally Gul. The alliance was led by Nawaz and Ghulam Mustafa Jatoi and opposed Benazir Bhutto's Pakistan Peoples Party (PPP) in the elections. The IJI gained a majority in Punjab, and Nawaz was re-elected as the chief minister.

In December 1989, Nawaz decided to remain in the provincial Punjab Assembly rather than hold a seat in the National Assembly. In early 1989, the PPP government attempted to unseat Nawaz through a no-confidence motion in the Punjab Assembly, which they lost by a vote of 152 to 106.

== Prime Minister (1990-1993) ==
Nawaz Sharif became the 12th Prime Minister of Pakistan on 6 November 1990, succeeding Benazir Bhutto, securing a majority in the National Assembly after the general election. His rise to power was the result of an election marred with controversy, with his victory orchestrated with the backing of President Ghulam Ishaq Khan and senior military officials—including Generals Aslam Beg, Hamid Gul, and Asad Durrani, the head of the Inter-Services Intelligence, who worked to buy the loyalties of politicians using funds from the country's foreign exchange reserves. Support also came from powerful drug barons such as Haji Ayub Afridi, Haji Mirza Iqbal Beg, and Sharif's own brother-in-law, Sohail Zia Butt. Sharif continued to maintain his ties with Iqbal Beg, who was arrested and subsequently released on bail as a result of his association with Sharif. In 1996, Asghar Khan filed a lawsuit, known as the Asghar Khan case, challenging the results of the 1990 elections, following the discovery of the Mehran bank scandal. Nearly two decades later in 2012, Generals Aslam Beg, Durrani, and Gul, along with banker Yunus Habib, admitted their involvement in manipulating the election. Later that year, the Supreme Court ruled in favour of petitioner Asghar Khan, agreed that the election was rigged, and ordered legal action against those responsible. As of 2025, no one has been held accountable.

Nawaz had campaigned on a conservative platform and vowed to reduce government corruption. He introduced an economy based on privatisation and economic liberalisation to reverse the nationalisation by Zulfikar Bhutto, notably for banks and industries. He legalised foreign money exchange to be transacted through private money exchangers. His privatisation policies were continued by both Benazir Bhutto in the mid-1990s and Shaukat Aziz in the 2000s. He also improved the nation's infrastructure and spurred the growth of digital telecommunication.

=== Conservative policies ===
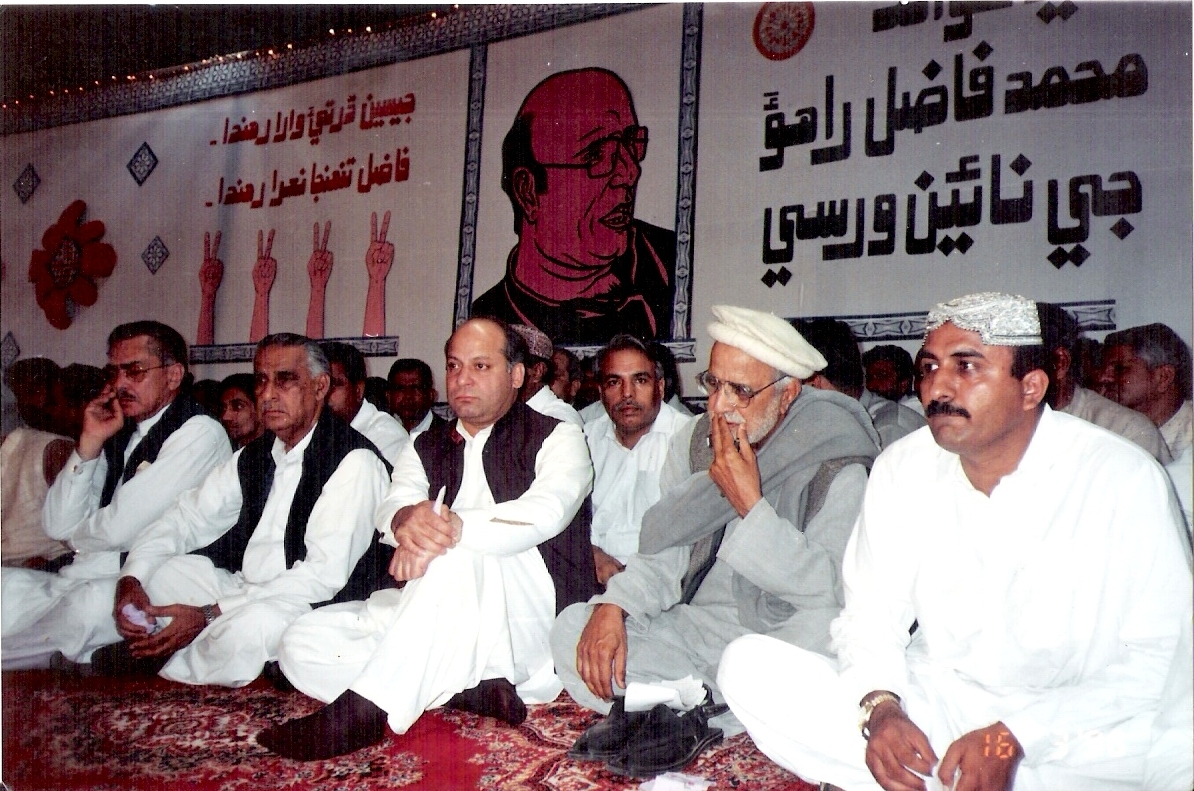
Nawaz meeting with conservative Sindhi intellectuals of Pakistan in Sindh Province, c. 1990s.

Nawaz continued the simultaneous Islamization and conservatism of Pakistan society, a policy begun by Zia. Reforms were made to introduce fiscal conservatism, supply-side economics, bioconservatism and religious conservatism in Pakistan.

Nawaz intensified Zia's controversial Islamization policies, and introduced Islamic laws such as the Shariat Ordinance and Bait-ul-Maal (to help poor orphans, widows, etc.) to drive the country on the model of an Islamic welfare state. Moreover, he gave tasks to the Ministry of Religion to prepare reports and recommendations for steps taken toward Islamization. He ensured the establishment of three committees:

- Ittehad-e-bain-ul-Muslemeen (English: Unity of Muslims Bloc)
- Nifaz-e-Shariat Committee (English: Sharia Establishment Committee)
- Islamic Welfare Committee

Nawaz extended membership of the Economic Cooperation Organization (ECO) to all Central Asian countries to unite them into a Muslim bloc. Nawaz included environmentalism in his government platform, and established the Pakistan Environmental Protection Agency in 1997.

=== Conflicts ===
Following the imposition and passing of Resolution 660, 661, and 665, Nawaz sided with the United Nations on the Iraqi invasion of Kuwait. Nawaz's government criticised Iraq for invading the fellow Muslim country, which strained Pakistan's relationships with Iraq. This continued as Pakistan sought to strengthen its relations with Iran. This policy continued under Benazir Bhutto and Pervez Musharraf until the removal of Saddam Hussein in 2003. Nawaz raised the issue of Kashmir in international forums and established Kashmir Solidarity Day as a national holiday and worked toward a peaceful transfer of power in Afghanistan to curb the rampant trading of illicit drugs and weapons across the border.

Nawaz challenged former Chief of Army Staff General Mirza Aslam Beg over the 1991 Gulf War. Under the direction of Beg, Pakistan Armed Forces participated in Operation Desert Storm and the Army Special Service Group and the Naval Special Service Group were deployed to Saudi Arabia to provide security for the Saudi royal family.

Nawaz faced difficulty working with the PPP and the Mutahidda Qaumi Movement (MQM), a potent force in Karachi. The MQM and the PPP opposed Nawaz due to his focus on beautifying Punjab and Kashmir while neglecting Sindh, and the MQM also opposed Nawaz's conservatism. Although the MQM had formed the government with Nawaz, the political tensions between liberalism and conservatism erupted into conflict by renegade factions in 1992.

To end the fighting between PML-N and MQM, Nawaz's party passed a resolution to launch a paramilitary operation under command of Chief of Army Staff General Asif Nawaz Janjua. Violence erupted in Karachi in 1992 and brought the economy to a halt. During this time, Benazir Bhutto and the centre-left PPP remained neutral, but her brother Murtaza Bhutto exerted pressure which suspended the operation. The period of 1992–1994 is considered the bloodiest in the history of the city, with many people missing.

=== The Friday Times Investigative Reports ===
An investigative report published by The Friday Times in May 1993 revealed that during his tenure, Nawaz's legal discretionary grant was limited to Rs 800,000 per year or Rs 1.6 million over the two-year 1991–1993 period, but he had actually spent around Rs 632.9 million and allocated those funds towards favoured politicians and developmental projects of his choosing. Most of these expenditures were financed by funds drawn from government programs like the Tameer-e-Watan Programme and the Pakistan Bait-ul-Mal. The report argued that these expenditures effectively created a parallel discretionary fund under his control and allowed him to channel public resources to political allies and favoured constituencies.

Additionally, the report mentioned Gohar Ayub Khan who was then the Speaker of the National Assembly as a key beneficiary. He received large amounts of development funding and rural electrification funds that were above the parliamentary allocation to committee members. The Friday Times highlighted that this was likely one of the reasons why Gohar Ayub Khan was so supportive of Nawaz Sharif during the political crisis of 1993.

=== Economy ===
==== Industrialization and privatisation ====
Nawaz had campaigned on a conservative platform and after assuming office announced his economic policy under the National Economic Reconstruction Programme (NERP). This programme introduced an extreme level of the Western-styled capitalist economics.

Unemployment had limited Pakistan's economic growth and Nawaz believed that only privatisation could solve this problem. Nawaz introduced an economy based on privatisation and economic liberalisation, notably for banks and industries. According to the US Department of State, this followed a vision of "turning Pakistan into a [South] Korea by encouraging greater private saving and investment to accelerate economic growth."

The privatisation programme reversed the nationalisation by Zulfikar Ali Bhutto and the PPP in the 1970s. By 1993, around 115 nationalised industries were opened to private ownership, including the National Development Finance Corporation, Pakistan National Shipping Corporation, National Electric Power Regulatory Authority, Pakistan International Airlines (PIA), Pakistan Telecommunication Corporation, and Pakistan State Oil. This boosted the economy but a lack of competition in bidding allowed the rise of business oligarchs and further widened the wealth gap, contributing to political instability. Former science advisor Dr. Mubashir Hassan called Nawaz's privatisation "unconstitutional". The PPP held that nationalisation policy was given constitutional status by parliament, and that privatisation policies were illegal and had taken place without parliamentary approval.

Privatization programme reached the GDP growth rate to 7.57% (1992) but dropped at 4.37% (1993; 1998).

Nawaz initiated several large-scale projects to stimulate the economy, such as the Ghazi-Barotha Hydropower Project. However, unemployment remained a challenge. In an attempt to counter this, Nawaz imported thousands of privatised Yellow-cab taxis for young Pakistanis, but few of the loans were repaid and Nawaz was forced to pay for them through his steel industry. Nawaz's projects were not evenly distributed, focusing on Punjab and Kashmir province, the base of his support, with lesser efforts in Khyber and Balochistan provinces, and no benefits from industrialization in Sindh province. After intense criticism from the PPP and MQM, Nawaz completed the Orangi Cottage Industrial Zone in Karachi but this did not repair his reputation in Sindh. Opponents accused Nawaz of using political influence to build factories for himself and his business, for expanding the Armed Forces' secretive industrial conglomerate and bribing generals.

=== Science policy ===
While privatising industry, Nawaz took steps for intense government control of science in Pakistan, and placed projects under his authorisation. In 1991, Nawaz founded and authorised the Pakistan Antarctic Programme under the scientific directions of National Institute of Oceanography (NIO), with the Pakistan Navy's Weapons Engineering Division, and first established the Jinnah Antarctic Station and Polar Research Cell. In 1992, Pakistan became an associate member of the Scientific Committee on Antarctic Research.

On 28 July 1997, Nawaz declared 1997 a year of science in Pakistan and personally allotted funds for the 22nd INSC College on Theoretical Physics. In 1999, Nawaz signed the executive decree, declaring 28 May as the National Science Day in Pakistan.

=== Nuclear policy ===
Nawaz made the nuclear weapons and energy programme one of his top priorities. He expanded the nuclear energy program, and continued an atomic programme while following a policy of deliberate nuclear ambiguity.

This resulted in a nuclear crisis with the United States which tightened its embargo on Pakistan in December 1990 and reportedly offered substantial economic aid to halt the country's uranium enrichment programme. Responding to US embargo, Nawaz announced that Pakistan had no atomic bomb, and would sign the Nuclear Nonproliferation Treaty if India did as well. The embargo blocked plans for a French-built nuclear power plant, so Nawaz's advisors intensively lobbied the International Atomic Energy Agency (IAEA), which allowed China to establish CHASNUPP-I nuclear power plant and upgrade KANUPP-I.

Nawaz's nuclear policy was considered less aggressive towards India with its focus on public usage through nuclear power and medicine, viewed as a continuation of the US Atoms for Peace programme. In 1993, Nawaz established the Institute of Nuclear Engineering (INE) to promote his policy for the peaceful use of nuclear energy.

==== Co-operatives societies scandal ====
Nawaz suffered a major loss of political support from the co-operatives societies scandal. These societies accept deposits from members and can legally make loans only to members for purposes to the benefit of the membership. However, mismanagement led to a collapse affecting millions of Pakistanis in 1992. In Punjab and Kashmir, around 700,000 people lost their savings, and it was discovered that billions of rupees had been granted to the Ittefaq Group of Industries – Nawaz's steel mill. Although the loans were hurriedly repaid, Nawaz's reputation was severely damaged.

=== Constitutional crisis and resignation ===
Nawaz had developed serious issues of authority with conservative President Ghulam Ishaq Khan, who had raised Nawaz to prominence during the Zia dictatorship. On 18 April, ahead of the 1993 Parliamentary election, Khan used his reserve powers (58-2b) to dissolve the National Assembly, and with the support of the army appointed Mir Balakh Sher as interim prime minister. Nawaz refused to accept this act and raised a challenge at the Supreme Court of Pakistan. On 26 May, the Supreme Court ruled 10–1 that the presidential order was unconstitutional, that the president could dissolve the assembly only if a constitutional breakdown had occurred and that the government's incompetence or corruption was irrelevant. Justice Syed Sajjad Ali Shah was the only dissenting judge; he was later appointed the 13th Chief Justice of Pakistan by Benazir Bhutto.

Issues of authority continued. In July 1993, under pressure from the armed forces, Nawaz resigned under an agreement that also removed President Khan from power. Chairman of the Joint Chiefs of Staff Committee General Shamim Alam Khan and the Chief of Army Staff General Abdul Waheed Kakar forced Khan to resign from the presidency and ended the political standoff. Under the close scrutiny of the Pakistan Armed Forces, an interim and transitional government was formed and new parliamentary election was held after three months.

== Parliamentary opposition (1993–1996) ==
Following the 1993 elections, the PPP returned to power under Benazir Bhutto. Nawaz offered his full co-operation as Leader of the Opposition but soon the PPP and PML-N held parliament locked in dispute. Bhutto found it difficult to act effectively in the face of opposition from Nawaz, and also faced problems in her political stronghold of Sindh Province from her younger brother Murtaza Bhutto.

Nawaz and Murtaza Bhutto formed the Nawaz-Bhutto axis and worked to undermine Benazir Bhutto's government, tapping an anti-corruption wave in Pakistan. They accused the government of corruption with major state corporations and slowing economic progress. In 1994 and 1995 they made a "train march" from Karachi to Peshawar, making critical speeches to huge crowds. Nawaz organised strikes throughout Pakistan in September and October 1994. The death of Murtaza Bhutto in 1996, which allegedly involved Benazir's spouse, Asif Ali Zardari, led to demonstrations in Sindh and the government lost control of the province. Benazir Bhutto became widely unpopular across the country and was ousted in October 1996.

== Prime Minister (1997–1999) ==
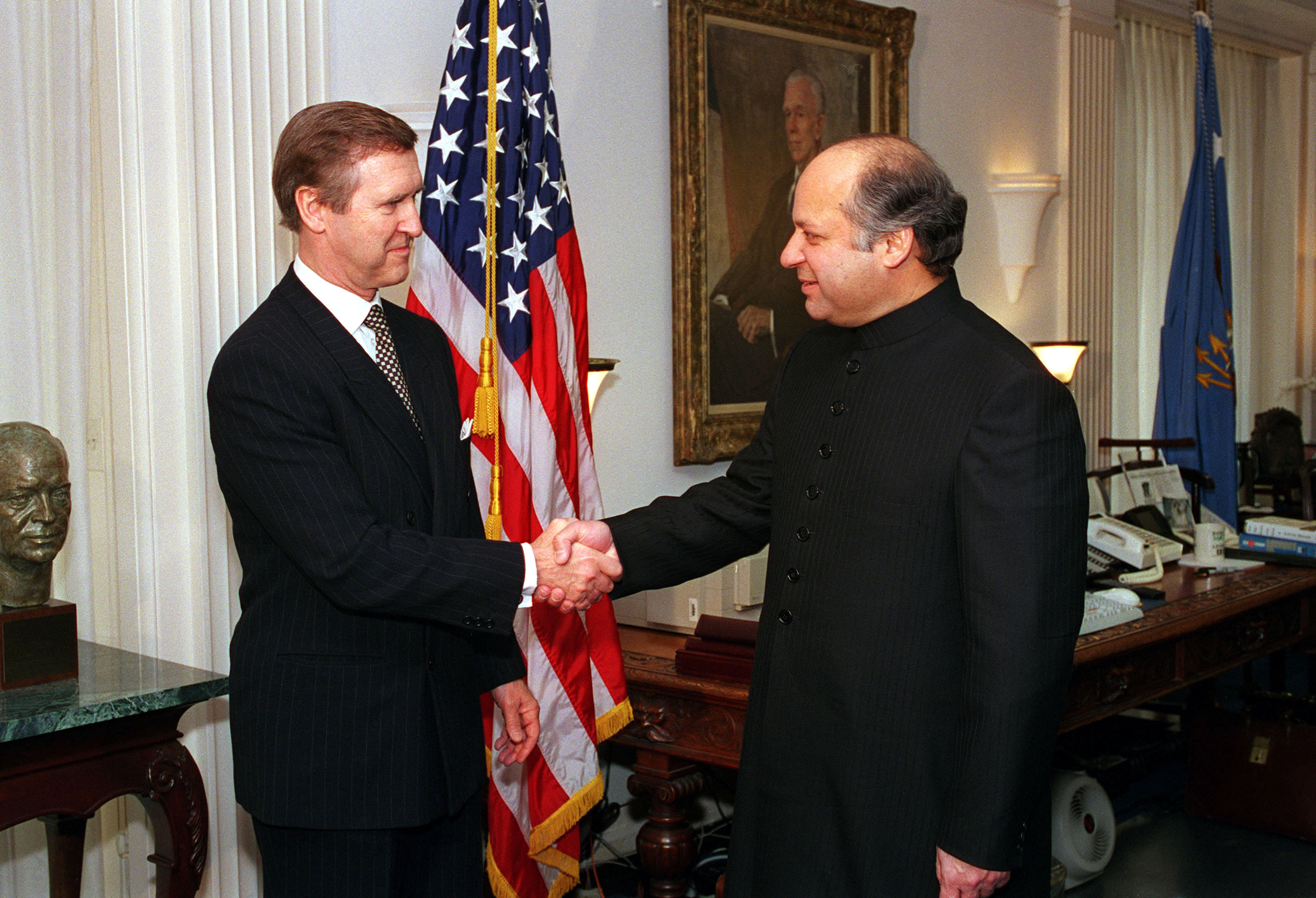
US Defense Secretary William S. Cohen with Nawaz (1998)

By 1996, continuous large-scale corruption by the government of Benazir Bhutto had deteriorated the country's economy, which was nearing failure. In the 1997 parliamentary elections, Nawaz and the PML-N won an overwhelming victory, with an exclusive mandate from across Pakistan. It was hoped that Nawaz would deliver on promises to provide a stable conservative government and improve overall conditions. Nawaz was sworn as prime minister on 17 February.

Nawaz had formed an alliance with Altaf Hussain of the MQM which fell apart following the assassination of Hakim Said. Nawaz then removed the MQM from parliament and assumed control of Karachi while MQM was forced underground. This led Nawaz to claim an exclusive mandate, and for the first time Nawaz and the PML-N had the control of Sindh, Balochistan, Northwest Frontier, Kashmir and Punjab. With a supermajority, Nawaz's new government amended the constitution to restrict the powers of the president to dismiss governments. With the passing of the 14th amendment, Nawaz emerged as the most powerful elected prime minister in the country.

Nawaz's popularity peaked in May 1998 after conducting the country's first nuclear weapons tests in response to tests by India. When Western countries suspended foreign aid, Nawaz froze the country's foreign currency reserves and economic conditions worsened. The country became embroiled in conflicts on two borders and Nawaz's long-standing relationships with the military establishment fell apart, so that by mid-1999 few approved of his policies.

=== Atomic policy ===
During the 1997 elections, Nawaz promised to follow his policy of nuclear ambiguity while using nuclear energy to stimulate the economy. However, on 7 September, before a state visit to the US, Nawaz acknowledged in a STN News interview that the country had had an atomic bomb since 1978. Nawaz maintained that:

The issue of [atomic] capability is an established fact. [H]ence the debate on this [atomic] [i]ssue should come to an end [...] Since 1972, [P]akistan had progressed significantly, and we have left that [developmental] stage far behind. Pakistan will not be made a "hostage" to India by signing the CTBT before [India].

— Nawaz Sharif, 7 September 1997

On 1 December, Nawaz told the Daily Jang and The News International that Pakistan would immediately become a party of the Comprehensive Nuclear-Test-Ban Treaty (CTBT) if India signed and ratified it first.

==== 1998 nuclear crisis ====
In May 1998, soon after Indian nuclear tests, Nawaz vowed that his country would make a suitable reply. On 14 May, Leader of the Opposition Benazir Bhutto and MQM called for nuclear tests, followed by calls from the public. When India tested its nuclear weapons the second time, it caused a great alarm in Pakistan and pressure mounted on Nawaz. On 15 May, Nawaz convened a meeting of the Defence Committee of the Cabinet (DCC) to discuss if Pakistan should respond to India's test and whether the Khan Research Laboratories (KRL) or Pakistan Atomic Energy Commission (PAEC) should carry out the tests. Only Finance Minister Sartaj Aziz opposed the tests, due to the economic recession, low foreign exchange reserves, and economic sanctions. Nawaz neither opposed or proposed the tests. Failure to conduct the tests would put the credibility of Pakistan's nuclear deterrence in doubt, which was emphasized when Indian Home Minister Lal Kishanchand Advani and Defence Minister George Fernandes gloated and belittled Pakistan.

On 18 May, Nawaz told the Chairman of the Pakistan Atomic Energy Commission (PAEC), Ishfaq Ahmad Khan, to make preparation for the tests but remain on stand-by for a final decision.

On 27 May, the day before testing, Saudi Arabia had received intelligence that they had orders to attack Pakistan's nuclear facilities on behalf of India. According to political scientist Shafik H. Hashmi, the US and other nations assured Pakistani leaders that Pakistan was safe; the Israeli attack never materialized.

On 28 and 30 May 1998, Pakistan successfully carried out its nuclear tests, codenamed Chagai-I and Chagai-II. Following these tests, Nawaz appeared on national television and stated:

If [Pakistan] had wanted, she would have conducted nuclear tests 15–20 years ago [...] but the abject poverty of the people of the region dissuaded [... Pakistan] from doing so. But the [w]orld, instead of putting pressure on [India ...] not to take the destructive road [...] imposed all kinds of sanctions on [Pakistan] for no fault [...] If [Japan] had its own nuclear capability [...] Hiroshima and Nagasaki would not have suffered atomic destruction at the hands of the [United States.]

— Nawaz Sharif, 30 May 1998, televised on PTV

Jamiat Ulema-e-Pakistan leader Ahmad Nurani congratulated the prime minister, Abdul Qadeer Khan and his colleagues, and Jehangir Karamat. In India, opposition leaders in parliament blamed the government for starting a nuclear arms race. Nawaz and Indian prime minister Atal Bihari Vajpayee were awarded the satirical Ig Nobel prize for their "aggressively peaceful explosions of atomic bombs".

The public's response to the tests were divided. On one hand were those who viewed the nuclear tests as necessary for national security and pride; on the other were ordinary citizens who were upset about having to endure even more economic consequences due to the sanctions placed on Pakistan and high levels of military expenditure at the expense of almost every kind of decent living condition. People expressed outrage toward many politicians who were urging them to "eat grass" and "tighten their belts" while they were living lavishly. Others said that there were more pressing needs that the government should address such as access to clean water, education, and healthcare as opposed to funding nuclear weapons.

=== Economy ===
Nawaz built Pakistan's first major motorway, the M2 Motorway (3MM), called the Autobahn of South Asia. This public-private project was completed in November 1997 at a cost of US$989.12 million. His critics questioned the layout of the highway, its excessive length, its distance from important cities, and the absence of link roads with important towns. It also appropriated funds designated for the Peshawar–Karachi Indus Highway, benefiting Punjab and Kashmir at the cost of other provinces. There was particular dissatisfaction in Sindh and Balochistan Provinces, and Nawaz faced a lack of capital investment to finance additional projects. Nawaz loosened foreign exchange restrictions and opened Karachi Stock Exchange to foreign capital, but the government remained short of funds for investments.

Due to economic pressures, Nawaz halted the national space programme. This forced the Space Research Commission to delay the launch of its satellite, Badr-II(B), which was completed in 1997. This caused frustration among the scientific community who criticised Nawaz's inability to promote science. Senior scientists and engineers attributed this to "Nawaz's personal corruption" that affected national security.

By the end of Nawaz's second term, the economy was in turmoil. The government faced serious structural issues and financial problems; inflation and foreign debt stood at an all-time high, and unemployment in Pakistan had reached its highest point. Pakistan had debts of US$32bn against reserves of little more than $1bn. The International Monetary Fund (IMF) had suspended aid, demanding the country's finances be resolved. Nawaz continued to meddle with the stock exchange markets with devastating effects. By the time he was deposed, the country was heading for financial default.

The Express Tribune claimed on 20 April 2015 that Sharif's administration misled the International Monetary Fund (IMF) over the tax charged on the issuance of bonus shares, as what should have been the largest source of income tax stood at a mere ₨1 billion. The government had told the IMF that it levied a 10% tax, which would generate revenue equal to 0.1% of GDP or ₨29 billion.

=== Foreign policy ===
In February 1997, Nawaz met with Chinese President Jiang Zemin and Premier Li Peng to discuss economic cooperation. Two conferences were organised in Beijing and Hong Kong to promote Chinese investment in Pakistan.

In 1997, Nawaz signed a trilateral free trade agreement with Malaysia and Singapore, which was followed by collaboration in defence. One of the core issues was Malaysia's agreement on sharing its space technology with Pakistan. Both Malaysia and Singapore assured their support for Pakistan to join Asia–Europe Meeting, though Pakistan and India were not parties to the treaty until 2008.

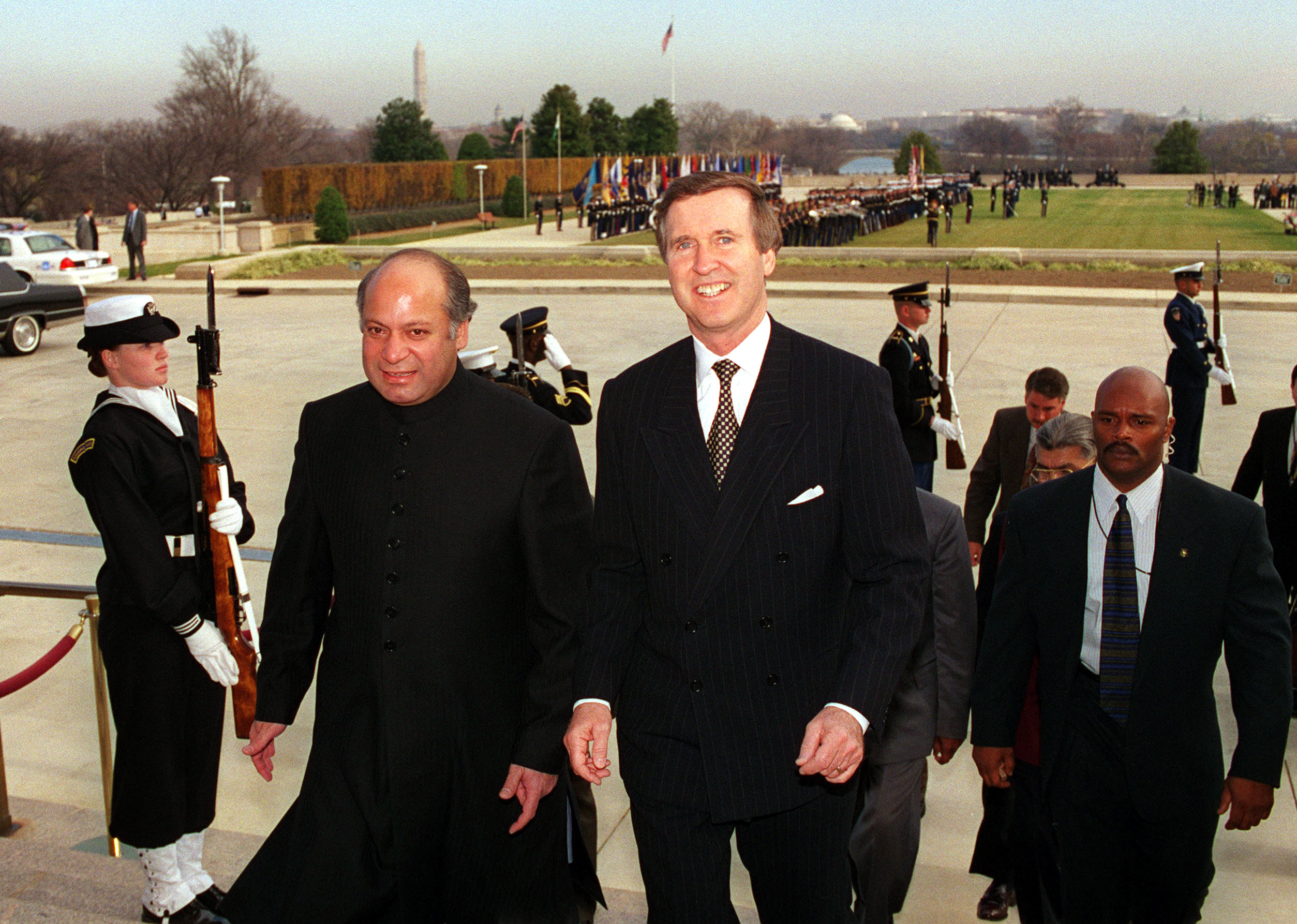
Nawaz in Washington D.C., with William S. Cohen in 1998

In January 1998, Nawaz signed bilateral economic agreements with South Korean President Kim Young-sam. Nawaz urged North Korea to make peace and improve its ties with South Korea; causing a division in Pakistan–North Korean relations. In April 1998, Nawaz went on to visit Italy, Germany, Poland, and Belgium to promote economic ties. He signed a number of agreements to enlarge economic co-operation with Italy and Belgium, and an agreement with the European Union (EU) for the protection of intellectual, industrial and commercial property rights.

However, Nawaz's diplomatic efforts seemed to have gone to waste after conducting nuclear tests in May 1998. Widespread international criticism brought Pakistan's reputation to a low since the Indo-Pakistani war of 1971. Pakistan failed to gather any support from its allies at the UN, and trade agreements were repealed by the US, Europe, and Asian bloc. Pakistan was accused of allowing nuclear proliferation. In June 1998, Nawaz authorised a secret meeting between Pakistan and Israel's ambassadors to the UN and US, and assured Israeli Prime Minister Benjamin Netanyahu that Pakistan would not transfer nuclear technology or materials to Iran or other Middle Eastern countries. Israel responded with concerns that Iranian Foreign Minister Kamal Kharazi's visit to Pakistan shortly after the May 1998 nuclear weapons tests was a sign that Pakistan was preparing to sell nuclear technology to Iran.

In 1998, India and Pakistan made an agreement recognising the principle of building an environment of peace and security and resolving all bilateral conflicts. On 19 February 1999, Indian Premier Atal Bihari Vajpayee paid a historic state visit to Pakistan, travelling on the inaugural Delhi–Lahore Bus connecting the Indian capital with Pakistan's major cultural city of Lahore. On 21 February, the prime ministers signed a bilateral agreement with a memorandum of understanding to ensure nuclear-free safety in South Asia, which became known as the Lahore Declaration. The agreement was widely popular in both countries, where it was felt that development of nuclear weapons brought added responsibility and promoted the importance of confidence-building measures to avoid accidental or unauthorised use of nuclear weapons. Some Western observers compared the treaty to the cold war Strategic Arms Limitation Talks.

=== Constitutional amendments ===
In late August 1998, Nawaz proposed a law to establish a legal system based on Islamic principles. His proposal came a week after the 10-year commemorations of the late president Zia ul-Haq. After his cabinet removed some of its controversial aspects, the National Assembly approved and passed the bill on 10 October 1998 by a vote of 151 to 16. With a majority in parliament, Nawaz reverted the semi-presidential system in favour of a more parliamentary system. With these amendments, Nawaz became the country's strongest freely elected prime minister. However, these amendments failed to achieve a two-thirds majority in the Senate, which remained under the control of the PPP. Weeks later, parliament was suspended by a military coup and Legal Framework Order, 2002 (2002 LFO) returned the country to a semi-presidential system for another decade.

Nawaz's Fourteenth Amendment consolidated his power by preventing legislators and lawmakers from dissenting or voting against their own parties, and prohibited judicial appeal for offenders. Legislators from different parties challenged this with the Supreme Court, infuriating Nawaz. He openly criticised Chief Justice Sajad Alishah, inviting a notice of contempt. At the urging of the military and president, Nawaz agreed the solve the conflict amicably but remained determined to oust Alishah.

==== 1997 Constitutional crisis ====
Nawaz manipulated the ranks of senior judges, deposing two judges close to Alishah. The deposed judges challenged Nawaz's orders on procedural grounds by filing a petition at Quetta High Court on 26 November 1997. Alishah was restrained by his fellow judges from adjudicating in the case against the prime minister. On 28 November, Nawaz appeared in the Supreme Court and justified his actions, citing evidence against the two deposed judges. Alishah suspended the decision of Quetta High Court, but soon the Peshawar High Court issued similar orders removing Alishah's closest judges. The associate chief justice of Peshawar High Court, Justice Saeeduzzaman Siddiqui, declared himself acting chief justice.

Alishah continued to assert his authority and persisted in hearing Nawaz's case. On 30 November, Nawaz's cabinet ministers and a large number of supporters entered the Supreme Court building, disrupting the proceedings. The chief justice requested the military police, and subsequently struck down the Thirteenth Amendment, restoring the power of the president. However, the military-backed Nawaz refused to obey the president's orders to remove him. Nawaz forced President Farooq Leghari to resign, and appointed Wasim Sajjad as acting president, then ousted Alishah to end the constitutional crisis.

On 29 November 2006, Nawaz and the PML-N issued a formal apology for their actions to Alishah and Leghari. A written apology was presented to Alishah at his residence and later, his party issued a white paper in Parliament formally apologising for their wrongdoing.

=== Policy on anti-terrorism ===
Nawaz passed the controversial Anti-Terrorist Act on 17 August 1997, which established Anti-Terrorism Courts. The Supreme Court later rendered the Act unconstitutional. However, Nawaz made amendments and received the permission of the Supreme Court to establish these courts.

=== Relations with the military ===
When Chief of Army Staff General Jehangir Karamat advocated for a National Security Council, Nawaz interpreted this as a conspiracy to return the military to an active political role.

In October 1998, three months before the end of his term, Karamat was forced to resign. Media Minister Syed Mushahid Hussain felt that Pakistan was "finally becoming a normal democratic society", not beholden to its military.

Nawaz promoted General Pervez Musharraf to replace Karamat, also making Musharraf Chairman of the Joint Chiefs despite his lack of seniority. Admiral Fasih Bokhari resigned as Chief of Naval Staff in protest. Bokhari lodged a protest against the Kargil debacle and called for the court-martial of Musharraf, who Nawaz said acted alone.

In August, India shot down a Pakistan Navy reconnaissance aircraft in the Atlantique Incident, killing 16 naval officers, the greatest number of combat casualties for the navy since the Indo-Pakistani Naval War of 1971. Nawaz failed to gain foreign support against India for the incident, which newly appointed Chief of Naval Staff Admiral Abdul Aziz Mirza viewed as a lack of support for the navy in wartime. Nawaz further lost the confidence of the Marines for failing to defend the navy at the International Court of Justice (ICJ) in September. Relations with the Air Force likewise deteriorated, when Chief of Air Staff General Parvaiz Mehdi Qureshi accused the prime minister of not consulting the air force in matters critical to national security.

Two months later, after steadily worsening relations with the Armed Forces, Nawaz was deposed by Musharraf and martial law was established throughout the country.

In November 2016, Lieutenant General (R) Abdul Qayyum, who Nawaz credits with bringing him into politics, said Nawaz chose Qamar Javed Bajwa as army chief because he wanted someone who supported the democratic system, respected the supremacy of Parliament, and was committed to the "betterment of the country". He stated that Bajwa possessed these qualities, which is why Sharif appointed him.

== Coup, trial, and exile ==
The simultaneous conflicts in the Kargil war with India and Afghanistan's civil war, along with economic turmoil, turned public opinion against Nawaz and his policies. On 12 October 1999, Nawaz attempted to remove Musharraf for military failures and replace him with General Ziauddin Butt. Nawaz intended to remove the Chairman Joint Chiefs and the Chief of Army Staff first, then depose the other armed forces chiefs who had destroyed his credibility. Musharraf, who was in Sri Lanka, attempted to return on a PIA commercial flight.

Nawaz ordered the Sindh Police Force to arrest Musharraf. Fearing a coup d'état, he further ordered the Jinnah Terminal to be sealed to prevent the landing of the airliner. The A300 aircraft was ordered to land at Nawabshah Airport (now Shaheed Benazirabad Airport). There, Musharraf contacted top Pakistan Army generals who took over the country and ousted Nawaz's administration. Nawaz was taken to Adiala Jail for trial by a military judge. Musharraf later assumed control of the government as chief executive. A single protest was held by Sardar Mohsin Abbasi in front of the Supreme Court on 17 October on the first hearing of Nawaz.

Raja Zafar-ul-Haq, Sir Anjam Khan, Zafer Ali Shah and Sardar Mohsin Abbasi were the only supporters left after the first six months. Many of Nawaz's cabinet ministers and his constituents were divided during the court proceedings and remained neutral. Dissidents such as Chaudhry Shujaat Hussain remained quiet and later formed Pakistan Muslim League (Q) (PML-Q), splitting Nawaz's party into small factions. The military police initiated massive arrests of the PML workers and party leaders, who were held in Sindh and Punjab police prisons.

The military placed Nawaz on trial for "kidnapping, attempted murder, hijacking and terrorism and corruption". In a speedy trial, the military court convicted Nawaz and gave him a life sentence. Reports surfaced that Nawaz had nearly been sentenced to execution. His leading defence lawyer, Iqbal Raad, was gunned down in Karachi in mid-March. Nawaz's defence team blamed the military for providing inadequate protection. The military court proceedings were widely accused of being a show trial.

Nawaz was also tried for tax evasion on the purchase of a helicopter worth US$1 million. The Lahore High Court agreed to acquit him if he could prove his innocence, but Nawaz was unable to cite any substantial evidence. He was ordered to pay a fine of US$400,000 on grounds of tax evasion, and he was sentenced to 14 years of imprisonment.

Pakistan and Saudi Arabia, under Nawaz and King Fahd, had enjoyed extremely close business and cultural relations that is sometimes attributed as a special relationship. Saudi Arabia was shocked at the news of the coup. Amid pressure by Fahd and US President Bill Clinton, the military court avoided a death sentence for Sharif. Fahd had expressed concern that the death sentence would provoke intense ethnic violence in Pakistan as had happened in the 1980s following the execution of Zulfikar Ali Bhutto. Under an agreement facilitated by Saudi Arabia, Nawaz was placed in exile for the next 10 years, and agreed not to take part in politics in Pakistan for 21 years. He also forfeited property worth US$8.3 million (£5.7 million) and paid a fine of US$500,000. Musharraf wrote in his memoirs that, without the intervention of Fahd, Sharif would have been executed. Nawaz travelled to Jeddah, Saudi Arabia, where he was taken to a residence managed and controlled by the Saudi government, and provided a Saudi loan to establish a steel mill.

In late 2005, when Pakistan and Israel began discussions, Al Jazeera reported that Sharif had said he had no objections with Pakistan establishing relations with Israel.

== Return to Pakistan and national politics ==
=== Failed attempt in Islamabad ===
The Supreme Court of Pakistan ruled on 23 August 2007 that Nawaz and his brother, Shehbaz Sharif, were free to return to Pakistan. Both vowed to return soon. On 8 September, Lebanese politician Saad Hariri and Saudi intelligence chief Prince Muqrin bin Abdul-Aziz held an unprecedented joint press conference at Army Combatant Generals Headquarters (GHQ) to discuss how Nawaz's return would affect relations. Muqrin expressed hope that Nawaz would continue with the agreement to not return for 10 years, but said "these little things do not affect relations".

Two days later, Nawaz returned from exile in London to Islamabad. He was prevented from leaving the aeroplane and he was deported to Jeddah, Saudi Arabia, within hours. His political career appeared to be over.

=== Successful return in Lahore ===
Musharraf went to Saudi Arabia on 20 November 2007, the first time he left Pakistan since implementing the emergency rule. He attempted to convince Saudi Arabia to prevent Nawaz from returning until after the January 2008 elections. Nawaz had become more politically relevant after the return to Pakistan of Benazir Bhutto, who had also been exiled. Saudi Arabia suggested that if Pakistan had allowed a democratic-socialist woman leader, Bhutto, to return to the country, then the conservative Nawaz should be permitted to return as well.

Nawaz returned to Pakistan five days later. Thousands of supporters whistled and cheered as they hoisted Nawaz and his brother on their shoulders. After an 11-hour procession from the airport, he reached a mosque where he offered prayers as well as criticism against Musharraf. His return to Pakistan allowed only one day to register for elections, setting the stage for an overnight shift of the political scene.

=== 2008 general elections ===
Nawaz called for the boycott of the January 2008 elections because he believed the poll would not be fair, given a state of emergency imposed by Musharraf. Nawaz and the PML-N decided to participate in the parliamentary elections after 33 opposition groups, including Bhutto's PPP, met in Lahore but failed to reach a joint position. He campaigned for the restoration of the independent judges removed by emergency government decree and Musharraf's departure.

Bhutto's assassination led to the postponement of the elections to 18 February 2008. Nawaz condemned Bhutto's assassination and called it the "gloomiest day in Pakistan's history". As the elections approached, the country faced a rise in attacks by militants. Nawaz accused Musharraf of ordering anti-terror operations that had left the country "drowned in blood". Pakistan's government urged opposition leaders to refrain from holding rallies ahead of the elections, citing an escalating terrorist threat. The PML-N rejected this, accusing officials of campaign interference.

On 25 January, Musharraf attempted British mediation to reconcile with the Nawaz brothers but failed. The elections were dominated by the PPP, boosted by the death of Bhutto, and PML-N. In the 342-seat National Assembly, PPP received 86 seats; the PML-N, 66; and the PML-Q, which backed Musharraf, 40.

=== In opposition (2008–2013) ===
Nawaz's party had joined a coalition with the PPP, led by its new leader Asif Ali Zardari but the alliance was strained by differences. Nawaz won much public support for his uncompromising stand, and the coalition successfully forced Musharraf's resignation from the presidency. After the coalition's collapse, Nawaz pressured Zardari to reinstate the judges Musharraf removed during emergency rule. This led to the courts absolving Nawaz's criminal record so that he could re-enter parliament.

==== By-elections ====
In the June 2008 by-elections, Nawaz's party won 91 National Assembly seats and 180 provincial assembly seats in the Punjab. Election for the Lahore seat was postponed due to questions of Nawaz's eligibility to contest.

==== Musharraf impeachment ====
The coalition government agreed on 7 August 2008 to impeach Musharraf. Zardari and Nawaz sent a formal request for him to step down. A charge sheet had been drafted and was to be presented to parliament. It included Musharraf's first seizure of power in 1999 and his second in November 2007, when he declared an emergency as a means of being re-elected president. The charge-sheet also listed some of Musharraf's contributions to the "war on terror".

The National Assembly was summoned four days later to discuss impeachment proceedings. On 18 August, Musharraf resigned as President of Pakistan due to mounting political pressure. On 19 August, Musharraf defended his nine-year rule in an hour-long speech.

Nawaz claimed that Musharraf was responsible for the crisis in the nation. "Musharraf pushed the country's economy 20 years back after imposing martial law in the country and ousting the democratic government".

==== Long March ====
Musharraf had dismissed 60 judges and Chief Justice Iftikhar Chaudhry under the state of emergency in March 2007, in a failed bid to remain in power. Sharif had championed the cause of the judges since their dismissal, and he and Zardari had supported the reinstatement of judges in their campaigns (see Lawyers' Movement). However, the new coalition government had failed to restore the judges, leading to its collapse in late 2008. Zardari feared that Chaudhry would undo all edicts instated by Musharraf including an amnesty that Zardari had received from corruption charges.

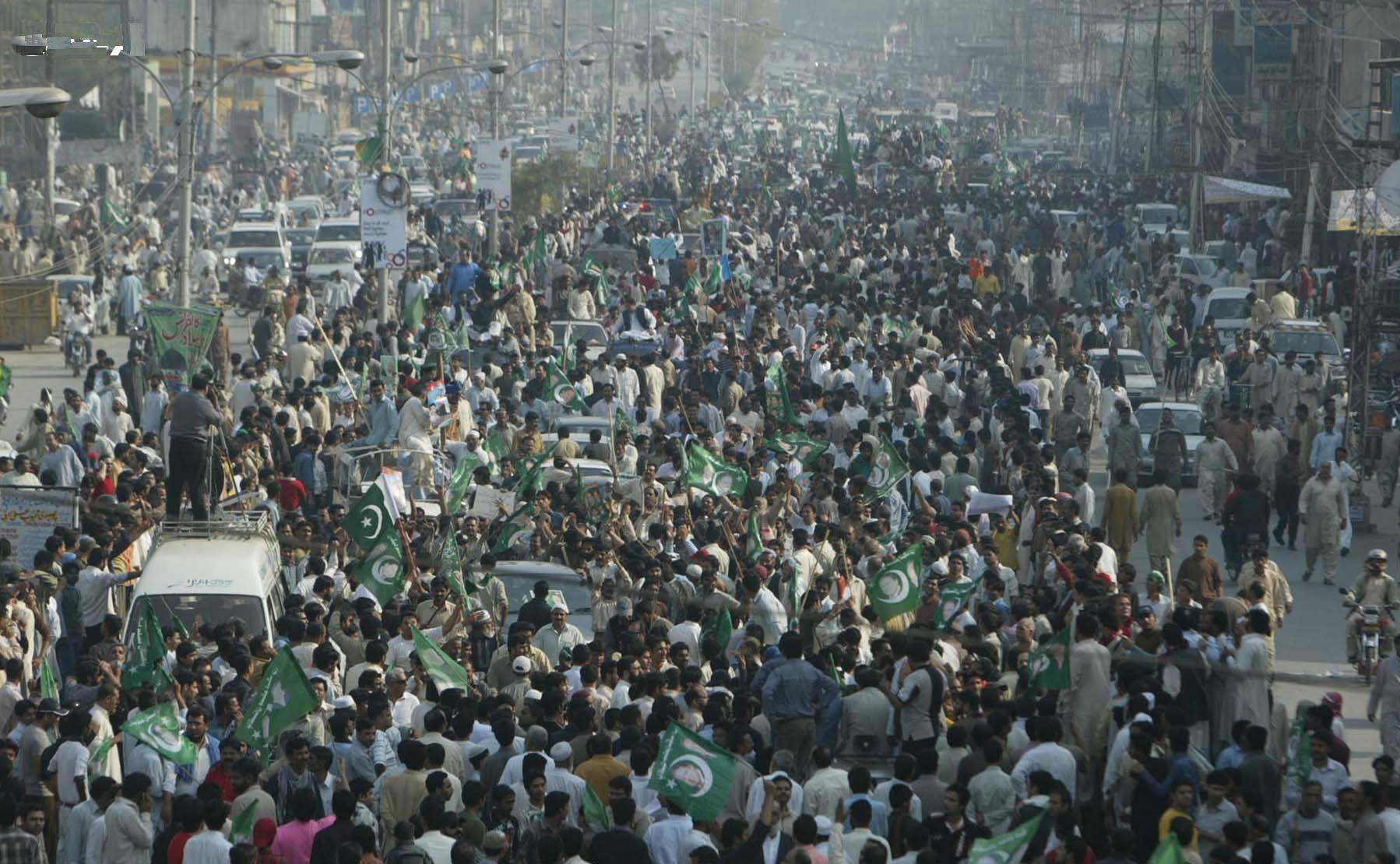
Long March led by Sharif moving through Ferozepur Road, Lahore.

On 25 February 2009, the Supreme Court disqualified Nawaz Sharif and his brother Shehbaz Sharif, the Chief Minister of Punjab, from holding public office. Lawyers and citizen's groups, civil activists, and a coalition of political parties were planning to take to the streets in a protest march. Zardari attempted to place Nawaz under house arrest, but the Punjab police left his residence after an angry crowd gathered outside. The police decision to lift his confinement was very likely in response to an army command according to The Economist. Nawaz, with a large contingent of SUVs, began leading a march to Islamabad but ended the march in Gujranwala. In a televised speech on 16 March, Prime Minister Yusuf Raza Gilani promised to reinstate Chaudhry after receiving pressure from Pakistan's army, American and British envoys, and internal protests. PPP made a secret agreement to restore the PML government in the Punjab. Nawaz then called off the "long march".

The PPP-led government continued to survive. A senior PML-N leader said "95% of the members of the PML(N) were against becoming part of the lawyers' movement, but after the [Supreme Court] verdict, the PML(N) had no other choice".

==== Removal of bar on third term ====
The 18th Amendment passed in Parliament on 8 April 2010, removing the bar which allowed prime ministers to serve a maximum of two terms in office. This made Nawaz eligible to again become prime minister, which he did in 2013.

=== 2013 Pakistan general election ===
==== Khan–Sharif rivalry ====
Between 2011 and 2013, Nawaz and Imran Khan began to engage each other in a bitter feud. The rivalry between the two leaders grew in late 2011 when Khan addressed a large crowd at Minar-e-Pakistan in Lahore. The two began to blame each other for many political reasons.

From 26 April 2013, in the run up to the 2013 elections, both the PML-N and the Pakistan Tehreek-e-Insaf (PTI) vehemently criticised each other. Khan was accused of personally attacking Nawaz and was given notice by the Election Commission of Pakistan, though Khan denied it.

==== Policies ====
It is only through your vote that you can bring change for prosperity, to strengthen the country's borders, end terrorism, improve education, and get land reforms and put Sindh and Pakistan on a path to progress.

— Nawaz Sharif

Nawaz campaigned on a promise to end loadshedding, construct motorways and Peshawar–Karachi high-speed rail. He also promised to construct a third port in Keti Bandar on the southern coast of Thatta District. Just prior to the election, Nawaz confirmed he had a long telephone conversation with Indian Prime Minister Manmohan Singh, suggesting a desire to improve diplomatic relations.

==== Results ====
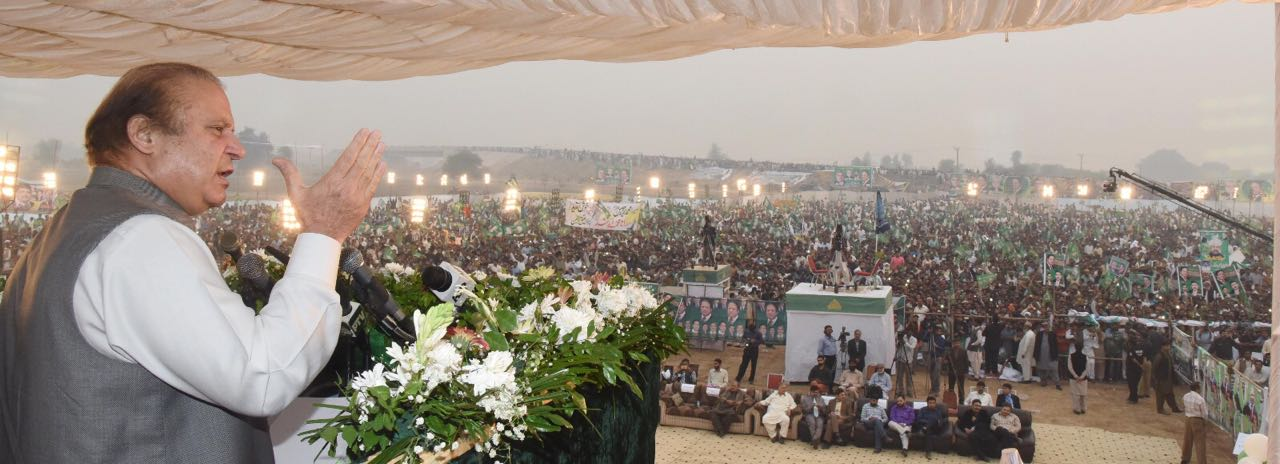
Sharif addressing a rally at Sangla Hill.

Voice of America reports on opposition protests against Nawaz Sharif in late 2014.

The Election Commission of Pakistan announced that the PML-N had won 124 seats in Parliament. Needing 13 additional seats to form a majority, Sharif held talks with elected independent candidates to form a coalition. Eight days later, 18 independent candidates joined the party, allowing PML-N to form the government without the agreement of another political party. Nawaz stated that he wanted to take his oath as prime minister on 28 May, the fifteenth anniversary of the Chagai-I nuclear tests.

On 27 June 2014, Khan announced that PTI would march on 14 August in protest of the government, alleging that the 2013 elections had been rigged. On 6 August 2014, Khan demanded the assemblies be dissolved and the resignations of the election commission and prime minister, claiming that the march would be the "biggest political protest in the history of the country." PTI began their march from Lahore on 14 August and reached Islamabad on 16 August. Khan accused Nawaz of plundering the national wealth, and called on the public to withhold taxes and payment of utility bills to force the government to resign. In protest of alleged election rigging, the PTI's lawmakers announced their resignation from the National Assembly, and the Punjab and Sindh assemblies. PML-N attempted to negotiate a settlement with Khan and his party's backers to break the political deadlock. On 22 August 2014, Khan and his fellow 33 PTI lawmakers resigned from the National Assembly. He called for a caretaker government to be formed of non-politicians, and for fresh elections.

== Prime Minister (2013–2017) ==
Nawaz was sworn in for an unprecedented third term as prime minister on 7 June 2013. He faced numerous challenges, including bringing an end to US drone strikes and Taliban attacks while also tackling a crippled economy. Speculation was rife that the new government would need a bailout from the International Monetary Fund to restore economic stability.

=== Social policy ===
Nawaz's third term moved from social conservatism to social centrism. In 2016, he called the future of Pakistan as one underpinned as an "educated, progressive, forward looking and an enterprising nation". In January 2016 he backed the Punjab government policy of banning Tablighi Jamaat from preaching in educational institutions and in February he enacted a law to provide a helpline for women to report domestic abuse, despite the criticism of conservative religious parties.

Nawaz's government hanged Mumtaz Qadri on 29 February 2016. Qadri had fatally shot Salman Taseer over his opposition to blasphemy laws. According to BBC News, the move to hang Qadri was an indication of the government's growing confidence in taming the street power of religious groups. To the disliking of religious conservatives, Nawaz promised that the perpetrators of honour killings would be 'punished very severely'. In March 2016, The Washington Post reported that Nawaz was defying Pakistan's powerful clergy by unblocking access to YouTube, pushing to end child marriage, enacting a landmark domestic violence bill, and overseeing the execution of Qadri.

Around 2,000 far-right Islamic fundamentist protesters led by Sunni Tehreek staged a sit-in at D-Chowk in front of the parliament in Islamabad on 27 March 2016, causing a partial shutdown of the capital. The protestors demanded the implementation of sharia in the country and declaring Qadri a martyr. The protestors burned cars and a public transit station and injured journalists and bystanders. In response, Nawaz addressed the nation, stating that those "fanning the fire of hatred" would be dealt with under the law. The government called in the army to enforce order. By 29 March the crowd had shrunk to 700 protestors, and the protest ended on 30 March after the government promised not to amend the blasphemy laws.

Nation's future lies in democratic, liberal Pakistan where the private sector thrives and no one is left behind

— Nawaz Sharif

Nawaz's government declared that the Hindu festivals Diwali and Holi, and the Christian festival of Easter, were officially public holidays. Time Magazine called this a "significant step for the country's beleaguered religious minorities." On 6 December 2016, Nawaz approved the renaming of Quaid-i-Azam University's (QAU) physics centre to the Professor Abdus Salam Center for Physics after Pakistani physicist and Nobel laureate Abdus Salam. Nawaz also established the Professor Abdus Salam Fellowship to fully fund five Pakistani doctoral students in physics. In response, the Council of Islamic Ideology criticised Nawaz's move, Salam being an Ahmadi, claiming that "changing the department's name would not set the right precedent."

Nawaz stressed the need for operation Zarb-e-Qalam to fight societal extremism and intolerance through the power of "writers, poets and intellectuals". Addressing the Pakistan Academy of Literature, Nawaz said that "in a society where flowers of poetry and literature bloom, the diseases of extremism, intolerance, disunity and sectarianism are not born". Nawaz also announced a ₨500 million endowment fund for the promotion of art and literary activities in Pakistan. On 9 January 2017, the government denied visas for international preachers for the Tablighi Jamaat conference in Lahore. Jamia Binoria criticised the government's decisions.

Nawaz, in a March 2017 address at Jamia Naeemia, urged Islamic scholars to spread the true teachings of Islam and take a firm stand against those who are causing disunity among Muslims. Nawaz called for a "progressive and prosperous Muslim world", and asked the "religious scholars to [...] take the war against these terrorists to its logical end."

On 7 April 2016, The Express Tribune claimed that Nawaz's multibillion-rupee health insurance plan seemed to be failing because of poor planning, claiming that the basic health infrastructure doesn't allow for such a plan.

=== Economy ===
Fiscal Year	GDP growth	Inflation rate
2013–14	▲4.14%	8.5%
2014–15	▲4.24%	4.8%
2015–16	▲4.5%	5.1%
2016–17	▲5.2%	

The country's economy faced many challenges including energy shortages, hyperinflation, mild economic growth, high debt and a large budget deficit. Shortly after taking power in 2013, Nawaz received a US$6.6 billion loan from the International Monetary Fund (IMF) to avoid a balance-of-payments crisis. Lower oil prices, higher remittances and increased consumer spending pushed growth toward a seven-year high of 4.3 percent in FY2014–15.

Asian Development Bank attributed gradual growth in economy to the continued low prices for oil and other commodities, the expected pick-up in growth in the advanced economies, and some alleviation of power shortages. However, the sovereign debt of Pakistan increased dramatically, with total debts and liabilities swelled to ₨22.5 trillion (or US$73 billion) by August 2016. Nawaz's administration issued a five-year $500-million Eurobond in 2015 at 8.25% interest and in September 2016, it also raised $1 billion by floating Sukuk (Islamic bonds) at 5.5%.

The Sharif administration negotiated free trade agreements (FTAs) to expand trade liberalisation, notably with Turkey, South Korea, Iran, and Thailand, and an expansion of the FTA with Malaysia.

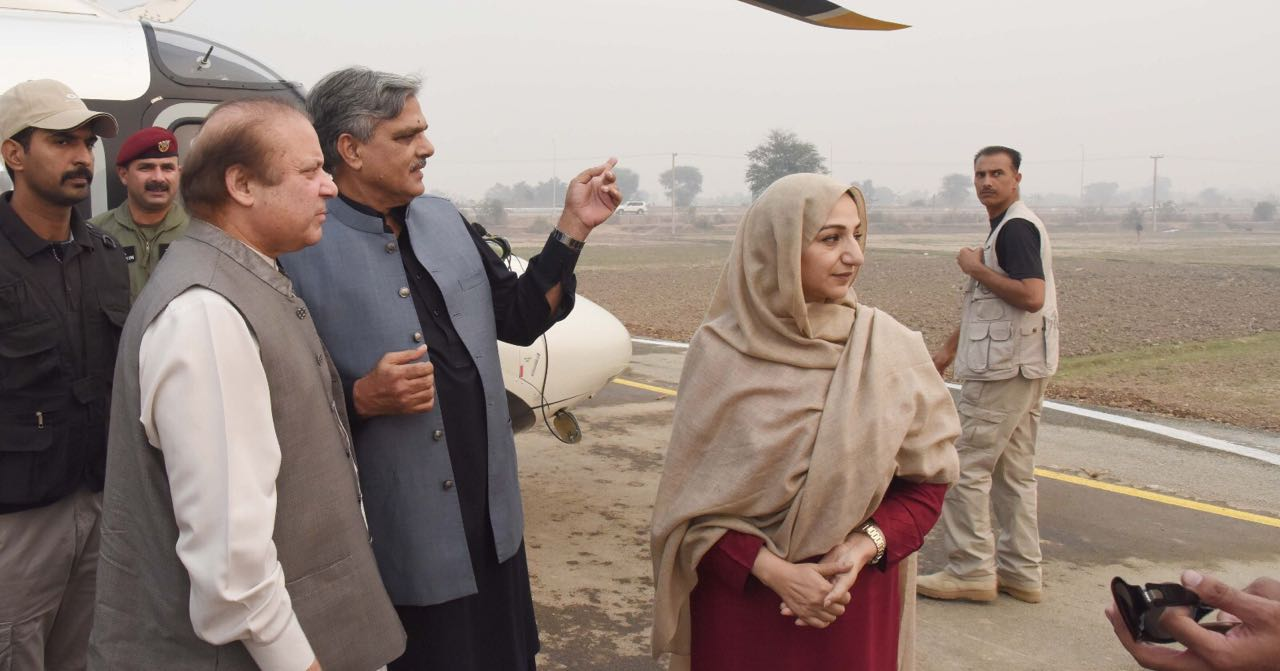
Sharif along with his cabinet members Barjees Tahir and Saira Afzal Tarar.

According to the Pakistan Institute of Legislative Development and Transparency (PILDAT), the quality of governance had 'marginally improved' during Nawaz's first year in power within an overall score of 44%. It scored highest in disaster-preparedness, merit-based recruitment, and foreign policy management, while it received the lowest scores on poverty alleviation and transparency.

On 4 July 2013, the IMF and Pakistan reached a provisional agreement on a US$5.3 billion bailout package to bolster Pakistan's flagging economy and its perilously low foreign exchange reserves, which was contrary to an election promise not to take any more loans. On 4 September, IMF approved another $6.7 billion loan package over a three-year period. IMF demanded Pakistan conduct economic reforms, including privatising 31 state-owned companies.

Business confidence in Pakistan reached a three-year high in May 2014 backed by increasing foreign reserves which crossed US$15 billion by mid-2014. In May 2014, IMF stated that inflation had dropped to 13% (compared to 25% in 2008), foreign reserves were in a better position and that the current account deficit had come down to 3% of GDP. Standard & Poor's and Moody's Corporation changed Pakistan's long-term rating to 'stable outlook'. The World Bank stated on 9 April 2014 that Pakistan's economy was at a turning point, with projected GDP growth approaching 4%, driven by manufacturing and service sectors, better energy availability, and early revival of investor confidence.

In FY2015, industrial growth slowed due to power shortages, as Sharif's administration failed to make adequate reforms in energy, taxation, and public sector enterprises. On 3 May, The Economist gave Sharif's administration partial credit for the economy's new stability, having upheld its agreements with the IMF. Standard & Poor revised Pakistan's credit rating from 'stable' to 'positive', noting the government's efforts towards fiscal consolidation, improvement in external financing conditions, and stronger capital inflows.

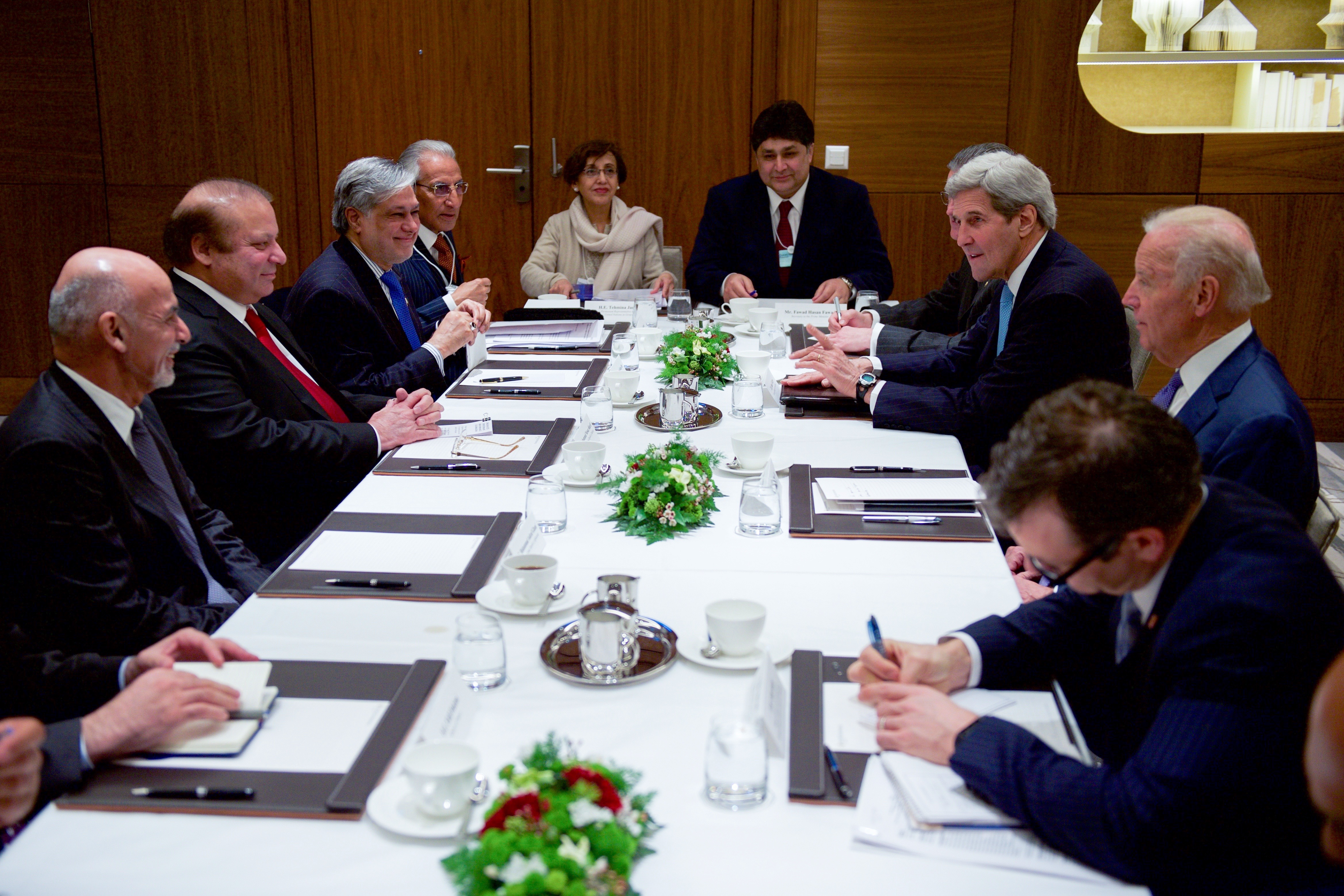
Nawaz at a trilateral meeting with Joe Biden during the World Economic Forum in Switzerland.

During a trip to Pakistan on 10 February 2016, World Bank Group's president Jim Yong Kim applauded the economic policies of Nawaz's government. He claimed that Pakistan's economic outlook had become more stable. On 19 March, Nawaz approved tax incentives in an attempt to attract new automotive manufacturing plants to the country. In November 2016, the government announced that Renault was expected to start assembling cars in Pakistan by 2018.

On 8 April 2016, following lobbying by international development groups, the government changed its methodology for measuring poverty. The poverty line was moved from ₨2,350 to ₨3,030 per adult per month, which increased the poverty ratio from 9.3% to 29.5%. A PILDAT survey claimed that the quality of governance had improved, though it was still weak for transparency. Fred Hochberg, head of the Export–Import Bank of the United States visited Pakistan on 14 April and said that he "sees a lot of opportunities to expand its exposure to Pakistan."

On 9 May, the World Bank's Pakistan Development Report stated that the current account was in a healthy position, but that Pakistan's export competitiveness has diminished due to protectionist policies, poor infrastructure, and high transaction costs for trade. Consequently, Pakistan's exports-to-GDP ratio had been declining for the last two decades.

On 15 December 2016, Pakistan became a signatory of the Organisation for Economic Co-operation and Development's (OECD) Convention on Mutual Administrative Assistance in Tax Matters, aimed at curbing tax evasion. In his 2016 book, The Rise and Fall of Nations, Ruchir Sharma stated that Pakistan's economy was at a 'take-off' stage and the future outlook to 2020 was 'very good'.

On 24 October 2016, months after the Sharif government concluded a US$6.4 billion three-year programmes, IMF managing director Christine Lagarde visited Pakistan, during which she maintained Pakistan was "out of the economic crisis". She added that continued efforts were needed to bring more people under taxation and to ensure that all paid their fair share. The 2017 Ease of doing business index recognised Pakistan as one of the ten countries making the biggest improvements to business regulations.

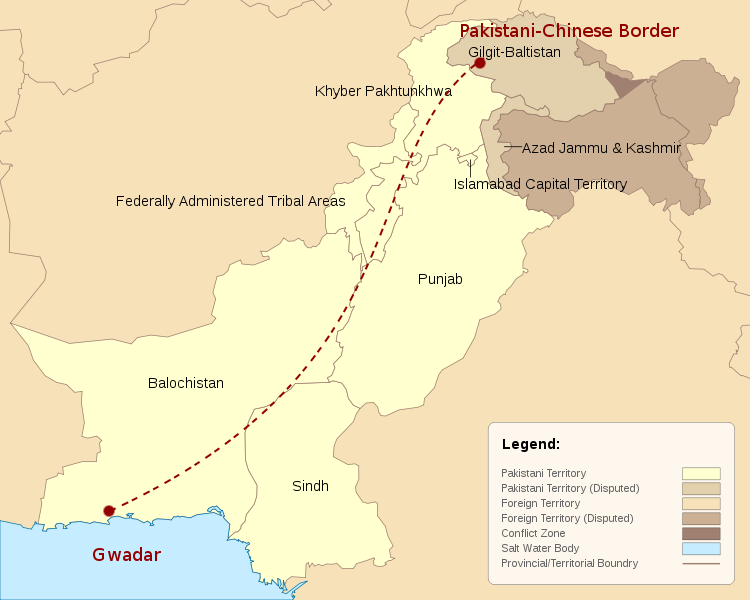
On 1 November 2016, Pakistan and China began trade under the China–Pakistan Economic Corridor project.

Hundreds of Chinese trucks loaded with goods rolled into the dry port in Gilgit-Baltistan on 1 November as the first shipment of the China–Pakistan Economic Corridor.

The government announced plans to restructure PIA, which sought to become more competitive by leasing newer and more efficient aircraft. PIA was split into two companies: a holding group would retain some ₨250 billion in debt and excess personnel, and a "new" PIA would hold the lucrative landing rights and new aircraft. The government planned to sell a 26% stake in the new PIA to a strategic partner. In February 2016, Pakistan International Airlines Corporation (PIAC) was to be converted into a public limited company as Pakistan International Airlines Company Limited (PIACL) to make way for privatisation, however, this trigged an eight-day union strike. On 23 December 2016, a Chinese consortium won the bid for a 40% stake in the PSX with an offer of US$85.5 million.

==== Communications and development ====
Upon assuming office, Nawaz launched the Public Sector Development Programme (PSDP) which constructed major projects to stimulate the economy. This included Diamer-Bhasha Dam, Dasu Dam, Faisalabad-Khanewal M-4 Motorway, Rawalpindi-Islamabad Metrobus Service and Lahore–Karachi Motorway. Nawaz also approved feasibility studies for numerous other projects. During FY2014–15, Nawaz's government announced additional PSDP funding from ₨425 to ₨525 billion. The government allocated ₨73 billion of PSDP funds for the China-Pakistan Economic Corridor, including the Lahore-Karachi Motorway.

The Economist, writing in January 2017, criticised Nawaz's spending on infrastructure, explaining that it sat unused as "the economic boom it was meant to trigger has never arrived." Regarding the China–Pakistan Economic Corridor, the magazine wrote that "critics fear the country will struggle to pay back the debt, especially if foreign-exchange earnings from exports continue to dwindle" further adding that "It may not concern Mr. Sharif unduly if the next generation of roads is as deserted as the last."

On 24 April 2014, mobile companies Mobilink, Telenor, Ufone and Zong won auctions for 3G and 4G mobile spectrum licenses, raising US$1.112 billion. Nawaz stated that ₨260 billion will be collected in annual revenue from the licenses, while the technology would create millions of jobs in the service sector. Nawaz also launched the Prime Minister's Youth Programme, providing a ₨20 billion fund for interest-free loans, skills development and provision of laptop computers under the Prime Minister's Laptop Scheme.

=== Imran Khan protests ===
Imran Khan began mobilising workers on 29 October 2016 to lockdown Islamabad, demanding Nawaz's resignation and a corruption inquiry. In response, the Sharif government placed a citywide ban on gatherings and arrested hundreds of opposition activists. The government also arrested scores of Pakistan Tehreek-e-Insaf workers and closed the motorway leading from Khyber Pakhtunkhwa. On 1 November, Khan ceased protests after the Supreme Court said it would form a judicial commission to probe allegations stemming from the "Panama Papers" leaks about the Sharif family's offshore wealth. In the first week of January, four Pakistani activists known on social media for their secular leftist views went missing.

=== Pakistan Vision 2025 ===
In August 2014, the Sharif administration unveiled an ambitious programme to enhance exports to US$150 billion by 2025. According to the Daily Times, the Vision 2025 is based on seven pillars: putting people first; developing human and social capital; achieving sustained, indigenous and inclusive growth; governance, institutional reform and modernisation of the public sector; energy, water and food security; private-sector-led growth and entrepreneurship, developing a competitive knowledge economy through value addition and modernisation of transportation infrastructure and greater regional connectivity.

Considering the existing political challenges faced by Sharif and shaky democratic process in the country, ownership of the rather flawed Vision 2025 is another major concern. The question is will future political setups continue to work on this plan to make it a reality, in case of any change of guard at the center? Each successive government in Pakistan has historically made a U-turn from its predecessor's policies. If this trend prevails, then the Vision 2025 will fail to translate into action.

— Arab News, 18 August 2014

=== Nuclear power policy ===
In November 2013, Nawaz broke ground on a US$9.59 billion nuclear power complex in Karachi, designed to produce 2200 MW of electricity. During the groundbreaking ceremony, Nawaz stated that Pakistan would construct six nuclear power plants during his term in office. He went on to say that Pakistan has plans to construct a total of 32 nuclear power plants by 2050, which will generate more than 40,000 MW. In February 2014, Nawaz confirmed to the IAEA that all future civilian nuclear power plants and research reactors will voluntarily be put under IAEA safeguards.

Nawaz attended the 2014 Nuclear Security Summit, and stated that Pakistan was giving nuclear security the highest importance.

=== FATA reform ===
On 4 March 2017, Sharif's administration approved the merger of FATA (red) with Khyber Pakhtunkhwa.

On 3 March 2017, Nawaz's cabinet approved a set of steps to be taken for the proposed merger of the Federally Administered Tribal Areas (FATA) with Khyber Pakhtunkhwa, along with a 10-year ₨110 billion development-reform package. Under the reform project, the jurisdiction of the Supreme Court and the Peshawar High Court will be extended to the FATA region.

=== National security and defence policy ===
On 9 September 2013, Nawaz proposed a civil-military partnership, and immediately reestablished the National Security Council with Sartaj Aziz as his National Security Advisor (NSA). Nawaz also reconstituted the Cabinet Committee on National Security (C^{2}NS), with military representation in the political body. According to political scientist and civic-military relations expert Aqil Shah, Nawaz finally did exactly what former chairman joint chiefs Jehangir Karamat had called for in 1998.

In September 2013, Nawaz announced that Pakistan would open unconditional talks with the Pakistani Taliban, declaring them stakeholders rather than terrorists. The PML-N's conservative hardliners also chose to blame the US and NATO for causing terrorism in Pakistan. However, Pakistani Taliban's Supreme Council demanded a cease-fire, to also include the release of all imprisoned militants and the withdrawal of the Pakistani military from all tribal regions. Former and current government officials criticised Nawaz for not providing clear leadership on how to handle the more than 40 militant groups, many of them comprising violent Islamic extremists.

On 15 September, just six days after Nawaz's proposal for talks with the Taliban, a roadside bomb killed Major-General Sanaullah Khan, a lieutenant colonel and another soldier in the Upper Dir district near the Afghanistan border. Taliban spokesman Shahidullah Shahid claimed responsibility for the bombing. On the same day, seven more soldiers were killed in four separate attacks. In a press release, Chairman joint chiefs General Khalid Shameem Wynne and chief of army staff General Ashfaq Parvez Kayani, who had earlier warned Nawaz not to adopt a surrender strategy, publicly warned the government that the military would not allow the Taliban to set conditions for peace. General Kayani stated: "No-one should have any misgivings that we would let terrorists coerce us into accepting their terms."

Pakistan desires peace and tranquility both within and outside its borders so that the much needed socio-economic development goals are achieved. We cannot afford to be distracted in fulfilling our national objectives. At the same [time] Pakistan will never compromise on its sovereignty and independence.

— Nawaz Sharif, addressing the Pakistan Naval War College

Seven members of the Pakistani Taliban conducted a terrorist attack on a public school in the city of Peshawar on 16 December, killing over 130 children in Pakistan's deadliest terrorist attack. In response to the attack, Nawaz – with consultation from all political parties – devised a 20-point National Action Plan which included continued execution of convicted terrorists, establishment of special military courts for two years and regulation of madrasas.

Based on the National Action Plan, the government made 32,347 arrests in 28,826 operations conducted across the country from 24 December 2014 to 25 March 2015. During the same period, Pakistan deported 18,855 Afghan refugees while the Federal Investigation Agency (FIA) registered 64 cases for money transfer through hawala, arrested 83 people and recovered ₨101.7 million. In total, 351 actionable calls were received on the anti-terror helpline and National Database and Registration Authority verified 59.47 million SIMs. On 28 March 2016, a suicide attack by the Jamaat-ul-Ahrar at a park in Lahore killed 70 people on the evening of Easter Sunday. Analysts believed that Nawaz's desire to maintain stability in Punjab led him to turn a blind eye towards groups operating there. Following the attack, Pakistan detained more than 5,000 suspects and made 216 arrests.

==== Karachi operation ====
The Sharif government launched a Pakistan Rangers-led operation on 5 September 2013 in Karachi, aimed at removing crime and terrorism from the metropolis. During the first phase, which lasted until 10 August 2015, Rangers were reported to have conducted 5,795 raids during which they had apprehended 10,353 suspects and recovered 7,312 weapons. Prominent among the raids were 11 March raid on the Muttahida Qaumi Movement (MQM) headquarters Nine Zero and the offices of Sindh Building Control Authority (SBCA). The first phase also saw a total of 826 terrorists, 334 target killers, and 296 extortionists arrested. The Rangers expanded their mandate to kidnappers, and arrested 82 abductors and secured the release of 49 captives. The report stated that targeted killing in the city had dropped by over 80%. On 23 August 2016, officials claimed that they had arrested 654 target killers affiliated with the Muttahida Qaumi Movement's (MQM) armed wing since 4 September 2013.

Karachi will be made a crime-free city and the operation will continue to achieve the objective. We are going ahead without being deterred by the incidents happening there. The crime rate of extortion and kidnapping is falling down in the city.

— Nawaz Sharif

==== Operation Zarb-e-Azb ====
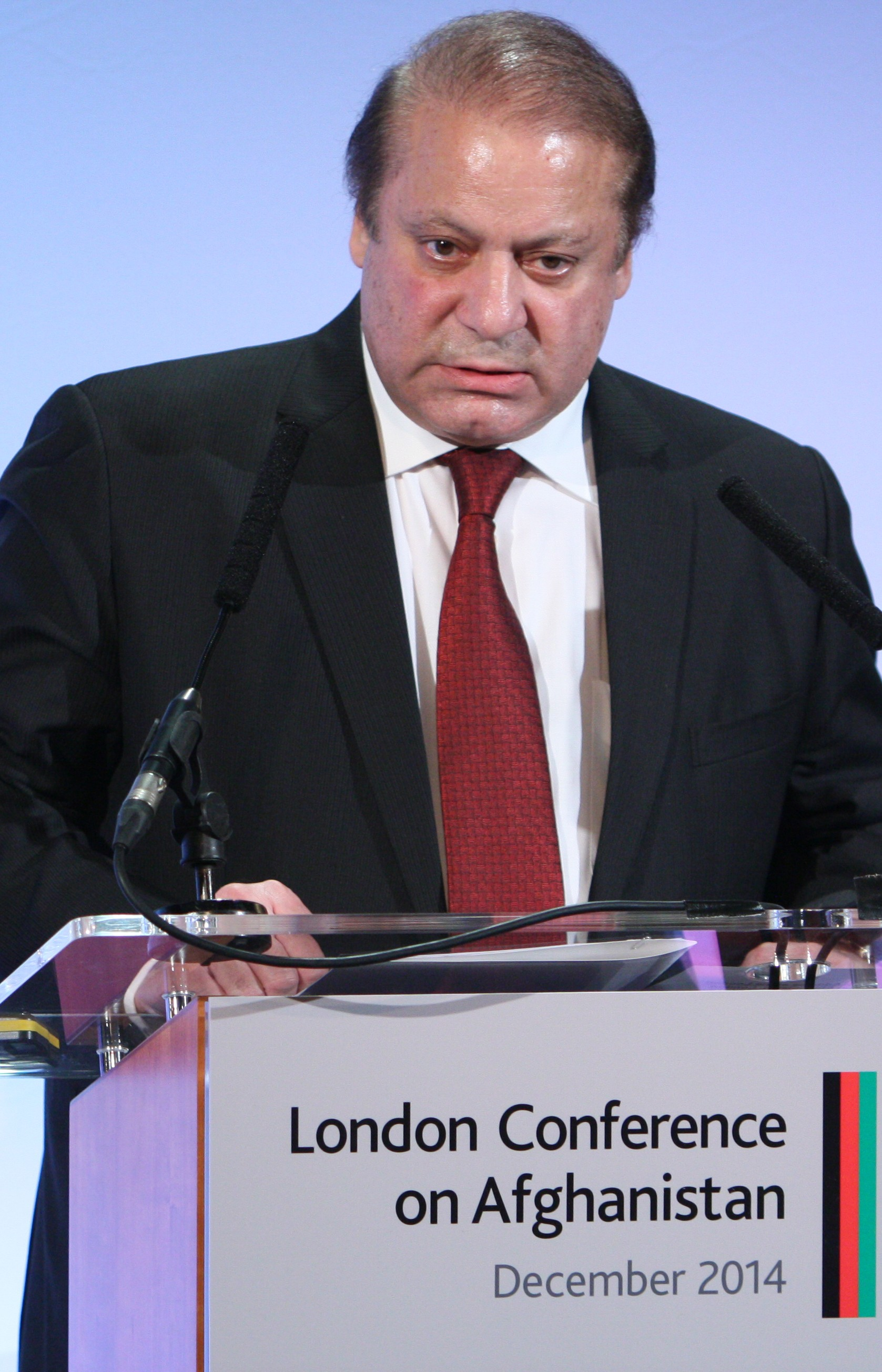
Sharif at the conference on Afghanistan in London

Negotiations with the Pakistani Taliban collapsed after the execution of 23 Frontier Corps by the Taliban on 17 February 2014, and relations worsened with the Taliban's 2014 Jinnah International Airport attack. Operation Zarb-e-Azb was formally launched on 15 June 2014 after the Sharif administration prepared for a three-front offensive: isolating targeted militant groups, obtaining support from the political parties, and protecting civilians from reprisals. The 2014 Wagah border suicide attack has been the deadliest retaliation against the operation so far.

=== Foreign policy ===
==== Neighbouring countries ====
Nawaz launched 'peaceful neighbourhood' initiative to improve Pakistan's ties with India, Afghanistan, Iran and China. On 12 May 2014, Nawaz met Iranian President Hassan Rouhani amid tensions over the February kidnapping of five Iranian soldiers by extremists who took them into Pakistan.

The cultural affinity among our peoples is a huge asset. Shared geography and history have culminated in a unique synthesis of cultures and traditions. We must therefore, place our people at the centre of the SAARC processes. SAARC must capture the imagination of our peoples and contribute to creating strong and mutually beneficial bonds.

— Nawaz Sharif, addressing the 18th South Asian Association of Regional Cooperation summit

On 27 October 2016, Nawaz hosted the 15th ministerial meeting of Central Asia Regional Economic Cooperation Program (CAREC), and proposed an Open Skies Agreement between the countries.

===== China =====
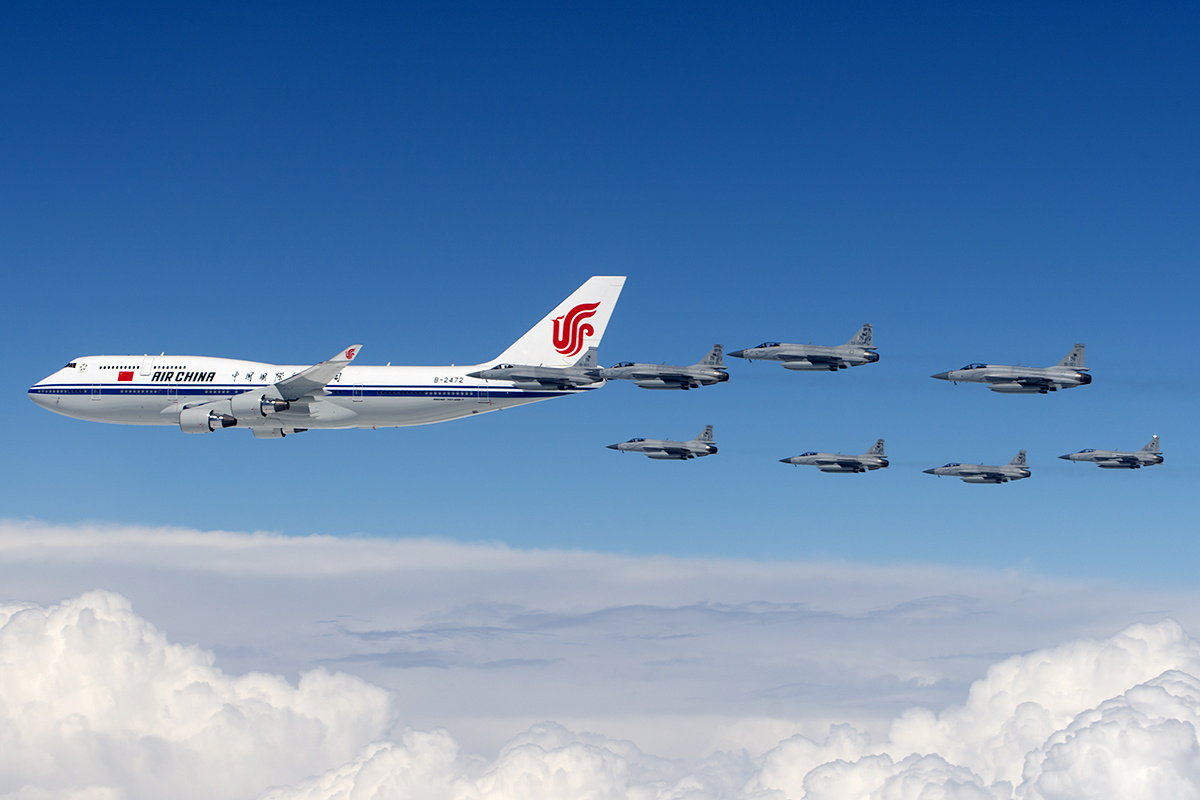
Xi Jinping was welcomed by eight JF-17s upon entering Pakistani airspace, 2015.

Chinese Premier Li Keqiang was the first world leader to visit Pakistan and congratulate Nawaz on his 2013 electoral victory. Upon return to Beijing, Li announced investment of US$31.5 billion in Pakistan, mainly in energy, infrastructure and a port expansion for Gwadar, the terminus of the China–Pakistan Economic Corridor. According to The Express Tribune, Sharif's government had charged the army with providing fool-proof security to Chinese officials in Balochistan to address Beijing's concerns regarding investment in the province, which was to receive 38% of the funds.

On 8 November 2014, Nawaz led a delegation to Beijing and signed agreements for Chinese investment reportedly worth about $46 billion. Nawaz also announced Pakistan would aid China it its fight against the East Turkestan Islamic Movement. On 24 June 2015 and again on 1 April 2016 China blocked India's move in the UN to ban Jaish-e-Mohammed chief Masood Azhar; the Chinese action was in "consultation" with Pakistan. On 25 June 2016, Pakistan became a full member of Shanghai Cooperation Organisation. On 4 September 2016, Pakistan's cabinet was given approval to negotiate a long-term defence agreement with China.

===== India =====
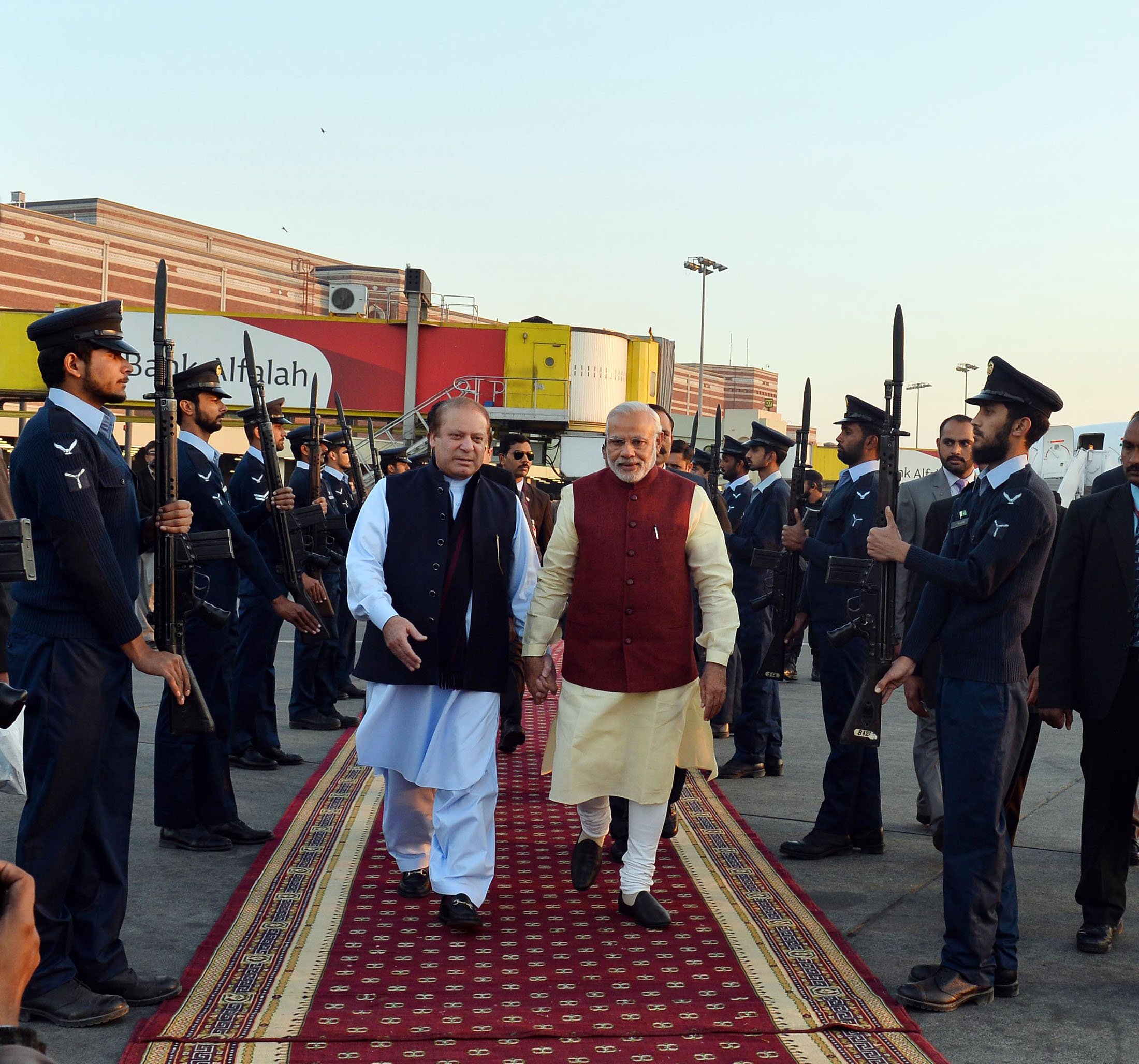
Indian Prime minister Narendra Modi received by PM Nawaz Sharif during former's unprecedented surprise visit to Lahore in 2015.

Nawaz launched talks with India to liberalize their trade relationship, and gained an agreement of Non-Discriminatory Market Access on Reciprocal Basis (NDMARB) status for the two countries on 26 March 2014. However, The Times of India reported that Pakistan's military pressured Nawaz to stop trade liberalisation with India. Nawaz attended 26 May 2014 first oath of office ceremony of Narendra Modi as prime minister, the first time that a prime minister from one state attended the inauguration of their counterpart. They agreed to further cooperate on trade.

In October 2014, 20 civilians were killed and thousands forced to flee their homes when Pakistani and Indian security forces began shelling in Kashmir, each side blaming the other for the incident. The following month, Nawaz blamed India for an inflexible approach towards resolving the Kashmir dispute. According to Barkha Dutt during the 2015 SAARC Summit, Nawaz and Modi held a secret meeting.

On 1 April 2015, Modi made his first visit to Pakistan in a surprise stopover in Lahore to meet Nawaz on his birthday. Modi and Nawaz held a brief meeting at Raiwind Palace. Modi also attended the wedding ceremony of Nawaz's granddaughter. On 10 December 2015, during the Heart of Asia conference, Pakistan and India announced that they were resuming dialogue on outstanding issues, ending a two-year stalemate.

Balochistan's Home Minister Sarfraz Bugti announced on 25 March 2016 that they had arrested an Indian naval intelligence officer working for Research and Analysis Wing (RAW). Kulbhushan Jadhav was alleged to be involved in financially supporting terrorists and to have also confessed to his involvement in the unrest in Karachi. The same day, India's Ministry of External Affairs stated that Jadhav had had no involvement with the government since his early retirement from the Indian Navy. India also demanded consular access for him. On 29 March 2016, Sharif's government released a six-minute video of Jadhav apparently confessing to the RAW's involvement in the country. On 1 April, Pakistan further said that security agencies had arrested several suspects believed to be working for RAW.

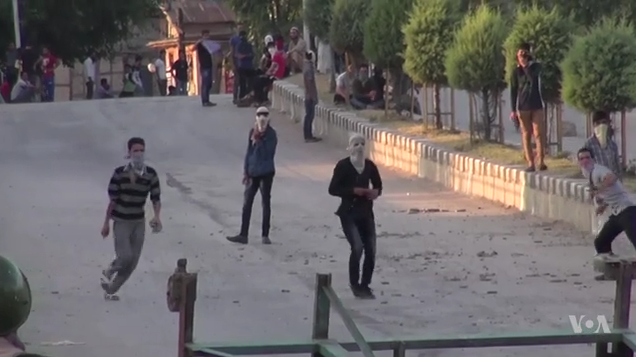
A screenshot of 2016 Kashmir unrest.

Relations between India and Pakistan escalated with the killing of Kashmiri militant Burhan Wani by Indian security forces on 8 July 2016. Anti-Indian protests started in all 10 districts of Indian-administered Kashmir. The unrest led to a standstill in bilateral relations. Indian Home Minister Rajnath Singh accused Pakistan of backing unrest in Kashmir. Tensions reached a boiling point when militants attacked an army base in the Indian-controlled side of Kashmir and killed 18 soldiers. Indian army military operations head Lieutenant-General Ranbir Singh claimed that there was evidence the attackers were members of an Islamist militant group in Pakistan.

Addressing the UN General Assembly on 22 September 2016, Nawaz demanded an independent inquiry and a UN fact-finding mission to investigate extrajudicial killing and human rights abuses in Jammu and Kashmir.

We demand immediate release of all Kashmiri political prisoners; an end to the curfew; freedom for the Kashmiris to demonstrate peacefully; urgent medical help for the injured; and abrogation of India's draconian laws

— Nawaz Sharif

India's junior foreign minister M. J. Akbar criticised Nawaz for glorifying Wani.

On 13 May 2018, after his ouster as prime minister, during an interview with newspaper Dawn, Sharif questioned Pakistan's inaction in preventing the 2008 Mumbai attacks, which was perpetrated by Pakistani terror outfit Lashkar-e-Taiba. The remarks were heavily condemned and rejected by Pakistan's National Security Committee, who stated that it was misleading, and that many political figures describing Sharif's statements had hurt national interests.

===== Afghanistan =====
Nawaz greeted Afghan President Ashraf Ghani on 15 November 2014 and pledged his support to the Afghan president over his attempt to bring the Taliban to the negotiating table. Al Jazeera reported that "the leaders also pledged to begin a new era of economic co-operation, with Ghani saying three days of talks had ended 13 years of testy relations". The two countries also signed a trade deal aimed at doubling trade between the Kabul and Islamabad to US$5 billion by 2017, while also pledging to work together on a power import project and Trans-Afghanistan Pipeline. During the visit Nawaz and Ghani also watched a cricket match between the two countries. During June 2016, cross-border shootings between Afghan and Pakistani forces left three people dead after tensions escalated over Pakistan's construction of fences across the Durand Line. On 20 June, Pakistan completed the construction of a 1,100-kilometre-long (680 mi) trench along the border in Balochistan.

==== United States ====
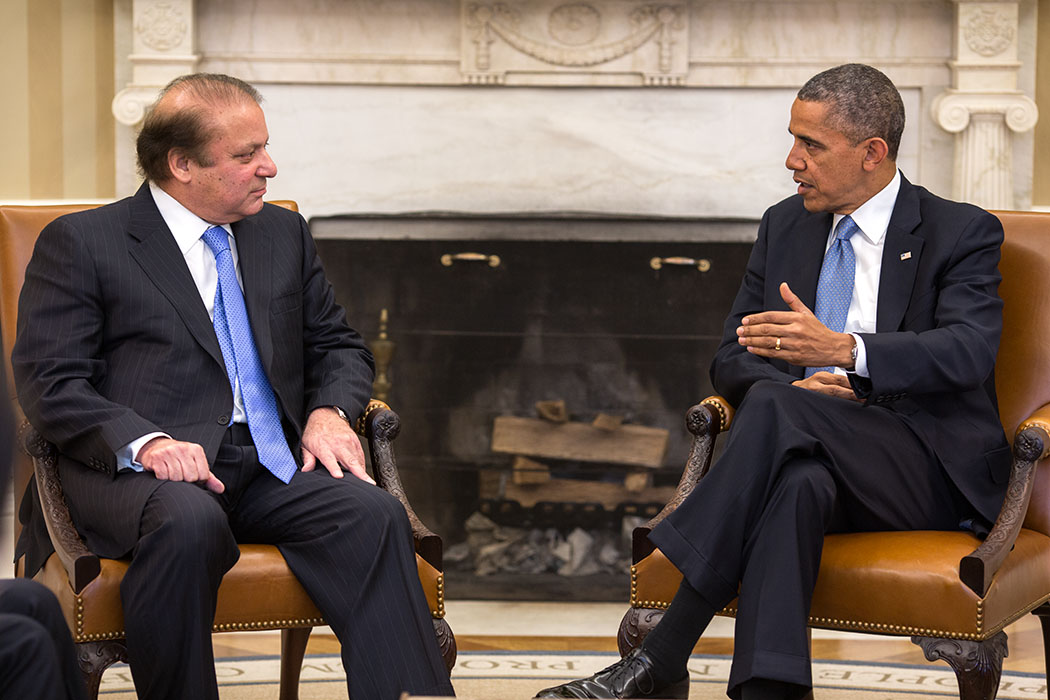
President Obama and Prime Minister Nawaz Sharif of Pakistan in 2014

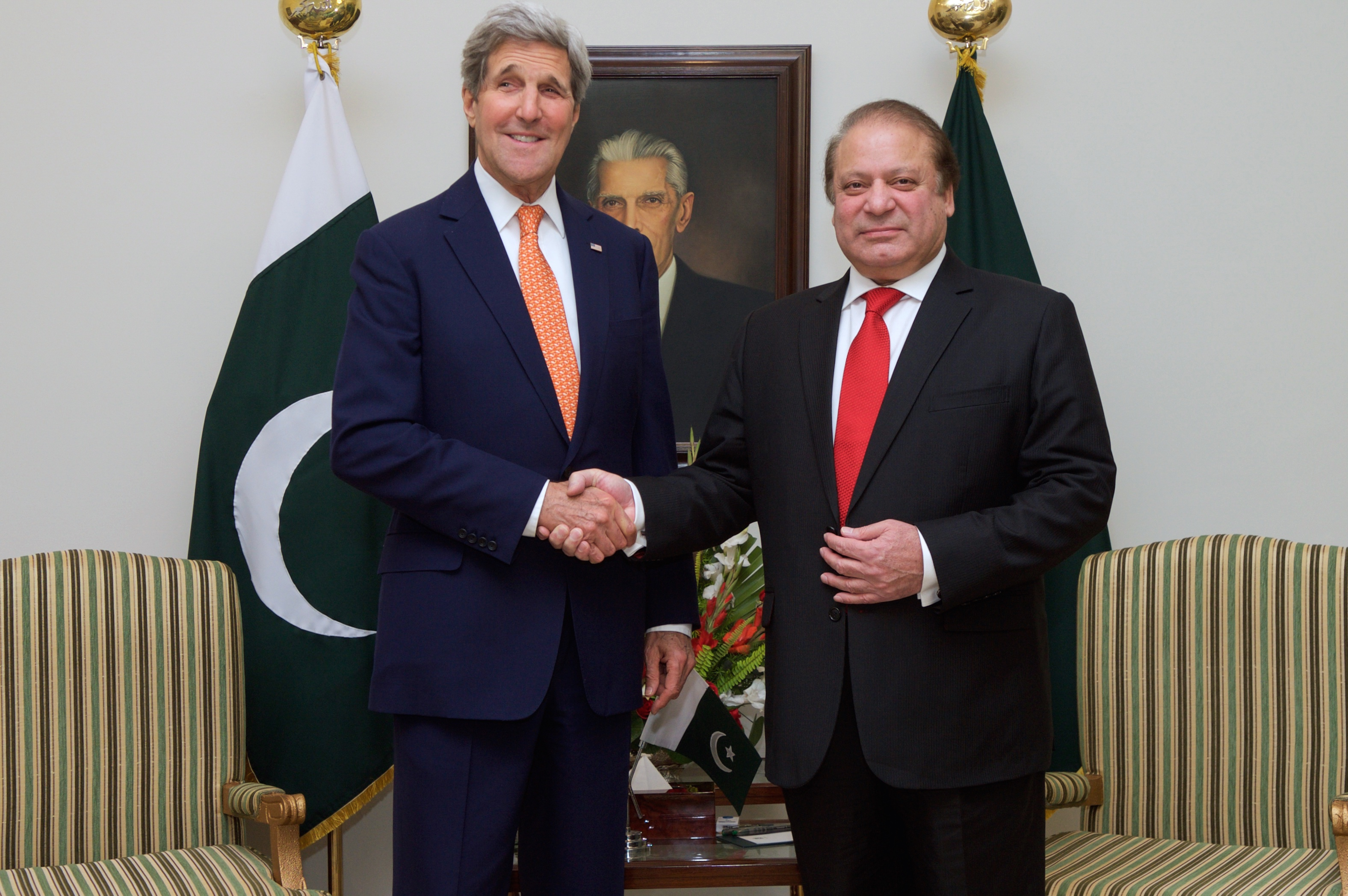
Sharif with U.S. Secretary of State John Kerry during a bilateral meeting in Islamabad, 2015

Nawaz paid an official visit to Washington, D.C. from 20 to 23 October 2013. He and Barack Obama committed to strengthening relations and advancing shared interests for a prosperous Pakistan. Voice of America reported that the US released more than US$1.6 billion in military and economic aid that was suspended when relations suffered over the covert raid that killed Osama bin Laden in 2011.

On Pakistan's request the United States temporarily stopped drone strikes in north-western Pakistan. In March 2016, as one of Sharif's foreign policy successes, the United States Senate blocked a bid to derail the sale of F-16 Falcons to Pakistan by Senate Foreign Relations Committee Chairman Bob Corker, who continued to vow to block the use of US funds to finance the deal.

We will extend every help to Pakistan so that it can eliminate terror from its soil.

— President Barack Obama, following the 2016 Lahore suicide bombing

US Senator John McCain travelled to Pakistan on 26 July 2016 to discuss counterterrorism efforts in the region. In the Financial Times, McCain called upon the US and Pakistani leaders not to "allow ambivalence and suspicion to fester", adding that "common interests in counterterrorism, nuclear security and regional stability are too important and too urgent". He also called upon the Obama administration to "make clear its enduring commitment to Pakistan's stability and economic growth." McCain also visited Miramshah in North Waziristan.

Republican Congressmen Ted Poe and Dana Rohrabacher moved a bill in the US Congress on 21 September to designate Pakistan as a state sponsor of terrorism. McCain assured former Pakistani President Asif Ali Zardari that the bill would not pass, and that its sponsors represented a small minority.

Nawaz called president-elect Donald Trump on 1 December 2016 to congratulate him. The statement released by Nawaz's office quoted Trump calling Nawaz a "terrific guy", adding that Pakistan is a "fantastic country, fantastic place". Trump Tower put out a statement saying that they "had a productive conversation about how the United States and Pakistan will have a strong working relationship in the future." On 3 December, Dawn reported that a US National Defence Authorisation Act was set to be approved by the US Congress which would recognise Pakistan as a key strategic partner and pledge more than US$900 million in economic and other assistance to the country; half of that would be dependent on Pakistan's commitment to fighting all terrorist groups, including the Haqqani network.

==== Europe ====
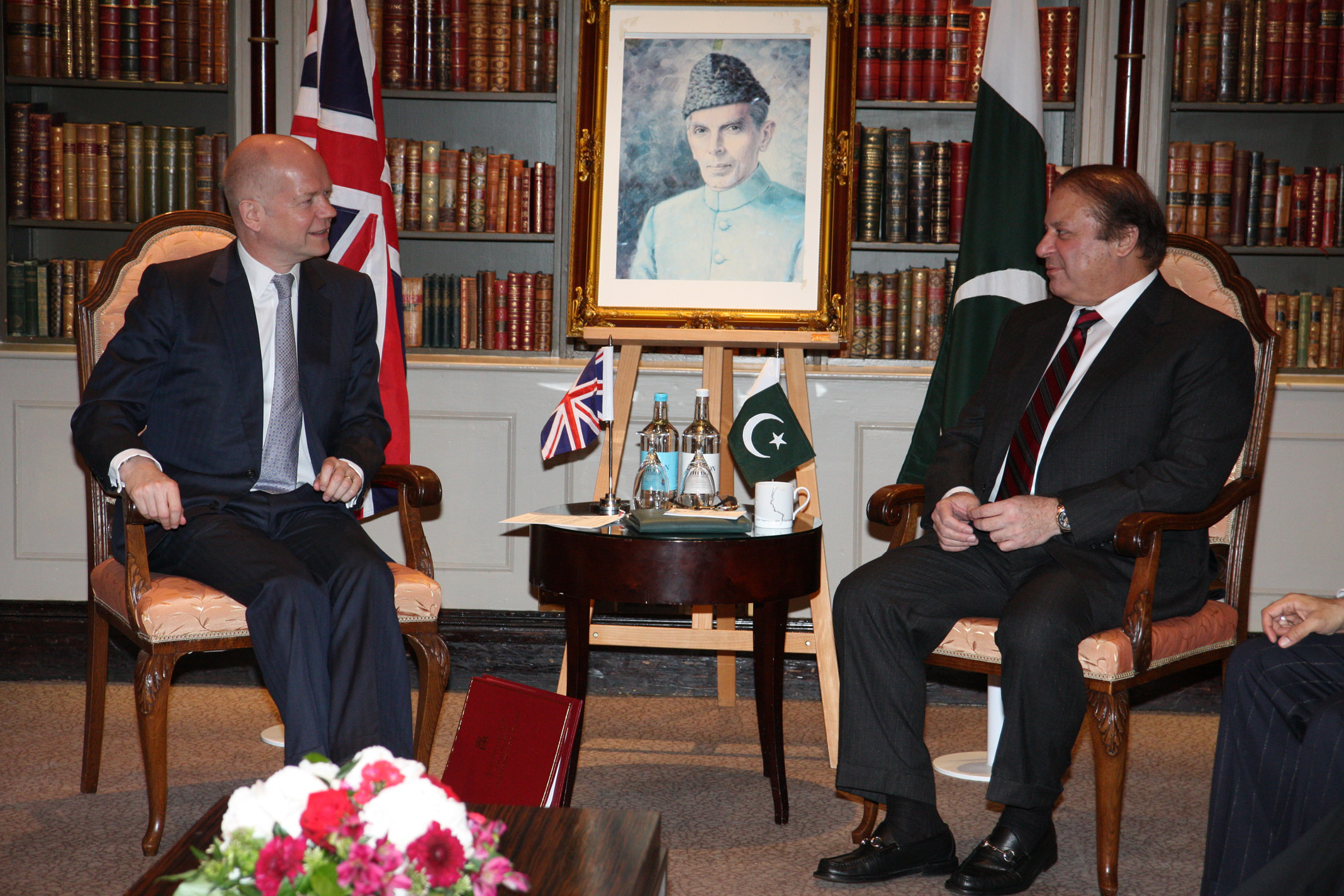
British Foreign Secretary William Hague with Nawaz in London

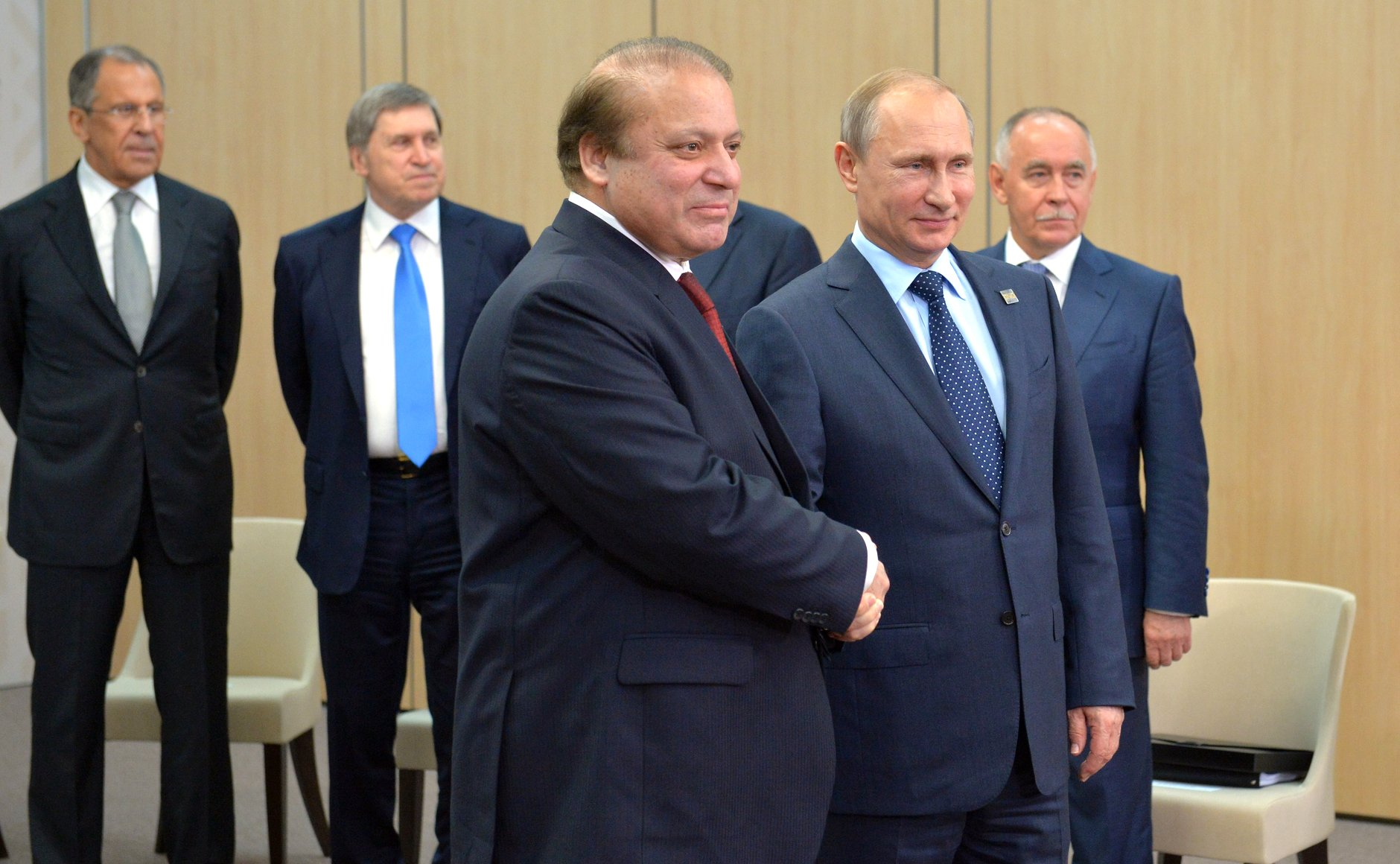
Nawaz with Vladimir Putin

Nawaz visited London on 30 April 2014 and met David Cameron and other officials, and delivered a keynote address at the Pakistan Investment Conference. According to Cameron's staff, the leaders agreed to work together to support critical economic reforms for Pakistan, particularly to increase the tax-to-GDP ratio towards 15%, and welcomed the developing relationship between the Federal Board of Revenue and HM Revenue and Customs to support this. On 11 November 2014, Nawaz visited Berlin where he met with German Chancellor Angela Merkel. According to Deutsche Welle, during the meeting Nawaz argued for more German investment, particularly in the energy sector, but Merkel expressed wariness over the security situation in Pakistan.

In 2014, during the visit of Russian Defence Minister Sergey Shoygu, Pakistan and Russia signed an agreement on military cooperation. Shoygu held in-depth talks with Nawaz, who promised to promote multi-dimensional relations with Russia. The meeting came months after Russia had lifted an embargo on supplying weapons and military hardware to Pakistan, starting with Mil Mi-24 helicopters. As a sign of improving ties, Russian forces arrived in Pakistan on 23 September 2016 to participate in joint military exercises.

==== Muslim world ====
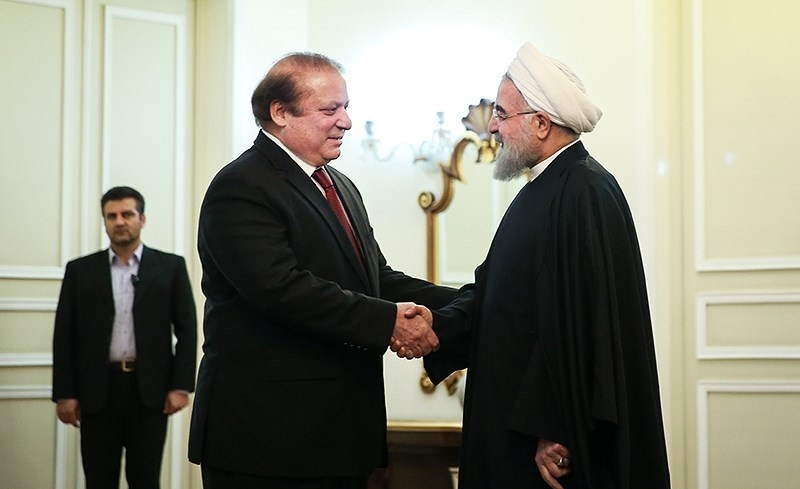
Sharif met with Iranian President Hassan Rouhani in Saadabad Palace.

Nawaz is said to enjoy exceptionally close ties with senior members of the Saudi royal family. Pakistan Today reported on 2 April 2014 that Pakistan will sell JF-17 Thunder jets to Saudi Arabia, after the kingdom had given a grant of US$1.5 billion to Pakistan in early 2014. Saudi Arabia's Crown Prince Salman bin Abdulaziz al-Saud arrived in Pakistan on 15 February to meet Nawaz and vowed to enhance work between the two countries. Sharif travelled to Saudi Arabia for the last 10 days of Ramadan. King Abdullah said on 26 July that Saudi Arabia would always stand by Pakistan, its leadership and people, after an hour-long meeting with Nawaz at his Riyadh. Nawaz also met Muqrin bin Abdulaziz Al Saud, while Salman of Saudi Arabia referred to Pakistan as his second home.

Al-Monitor reported on 15 March 2015 that the Salman of Saudi Arabia wanted firm assurances from Nawaz that Pakistan would align itself with Saudi Arabia and its Sunni Arab allies against Iran, especially in the proxy war underway in Yemen. Salman specifically wanted a Pakistani military contingent to deploy to the kingdom to defend the borders. Nawaz promised closer counter-terrorism and military co-operation but no troops for the immediate future. On 11 January 2016, Time stated that a high-level Saudi delegation including Adel al-Jubeir and Mohammed bin Salman had travelled to Islamabad to seek Pakistan's inclusion in the 34-country "Islamic military alliance". However, Nawaz struck a more conciliatory tone, suggesting that Islamabad would mediate between Saudi Arabia and Iran. On 19 January 2016, Nawaz and Chief of Army Staff Raheel Sharif embarked on a peace mission to Riyadh and Tehran to reduce tensions which had escalated with the execution of Sheikh Nimr On 16 March 2016, Zee News claimed that Saudi Arabia was creating a military alliance of Islamic countries along the lines of the NATO, and wished Pakistan to lead it. Islamic Military Counter Terrorism Coalition was eventually created and led by Raheel.

Nawaz supported the Saudi-led intervention in Bahrain and in his visit to Saudi Arabia he reassured that he would "help devise a new battle plan for Saudi intervention in the country."

== Post-premiership ==
=== Panama Papers case ===
The Avenfield case or the Panama Papers case pertains to the ownership of four luxury apartments in London. The case emerged from the Panama Papers leak, which revealed significant overseas assets held by the Sharif family. According to the Panama Papers, documents leaked in 2016 from law firm Mossack Fonseca, Nawaz's family holds millions of dollars' worth of property and companies in the UK and around the world. Although they do not name Nawaz Sharif or his younger brother Shehbaz Sharif, they link in-laws of Shehbaz Sharif and children of Nawaz Sharif to numerous offshore companies.

On 15 April 2016, the government announced an investigation by an inquiry commission of all Pakistanis named in the documents. Opposition politicians said a judge, not a retired judge, should investigate. Various judges recused themselves. In addition, on 19 April, army chief General Raheel Sharif warned that across-the-board accountability was needed.

The court announced its decision on 28 July 2017 and disqualified Nawaz from holding public office, finding that he had been dishonest; Nawaz then stood down as Prime Minister. The court also ordered National Accountability Bureau to file corruption charges against Nawaz and his family.

In 2018, the Pakistani Supreme Court ruled in Sami Ullah Baloch v. Abdul Karim Nousherwani that Nawaz would be disqualified from holding public office for life due to his involvement in the Panama Papers case of 2017. On 6 July 2018, the Federal Judicial Complex of Pakistan sentenced Nawaz to ten years in prison. Nawaz's daughter Maryam Nawaz and her husband Safdar Awan were given prison sentences of seven years and one year, respectively. The two were subsequently arrested on their arrival in Lahore on 13 July and imprisoned in the Adiala Jail. Nawaz and Maryam were also fined £2 million and £8 million, respectively.

However, the Islamabad High Court (IHC) later suspended their sentences, citing several issues with the conviction. The IHC noted that the National Accountability Bureau (NAB) did not specify Sharif's exact income or sources of income in its reference. The evidence provided lacked proper verification, and there was no clear determination of the value of the Avenfield Apartments at the time of their acquisition. Additionally, the IHC found no evidence connecting Maryam Nawaz Sharif to the alleged conspiracy with her father.

=== Al-Azizia Steel Mills case ===
This case involves allegations that Nawaz Sharif received funds from his son's company in Saudi Arabia, Al-Azizia Steel Mills, which were not declared. In December 2018, Nawaz Sharif was sentenced to seven years in prison by an accountability court and fined Rs1.5 billion and US$25 million. He was also disqualified from holding any public office for 10 years following his release from prison.

However, the Islamabad High Court nullified this conviction in a 2023 ruling. Sharif, maintains that the charges were politically motivated.

=== Flagship Investments case ===
This case was also related to the Panama Papers and involved accusations that Nawaz Sharif owned undisclosed assets through a number of companies including Flagship Investments. However, Nawaz Sharif was acquitted in this case in December 2018, as the accountability court found insufficient evidence to convict him. The National Accountability Bureau (NAB) could not establish Sharif's relationship with 16 companies involved in the corruption reference.

=== Hudaibiya Paper Mills money laundering case ===
Finance Minister Ishaq Dar, a close associate and relative of the Sharif family, provided a confessional statement to a magistrate, claiming the Sharif brothers utilized Hudaibiya Paper Mills for money laundering in the late 1990s. Dar subsequently retracted his statement, asserting it was made under duress.

=== Acquittal from cases and moving to London ===
Reports claimed that Nawaz suffered four angina attacks and his family complained that the Imran Khan government was not allowing him time for medical treatment. The Islamabad High Court (IHC) granted him bail on humanitarian grounds in October 2019, and Nawaz went to London for medical treatment. Later in March, he was granted bail for a period of six weeks by the Supreme Court to continue pursuing his health treatment. After failing to return to Pakistan when his bail expired, the IHC declared him an absconder. Non-bailable arrest warrants were then issued for the Al-Azizia corruption case. However, soon after his brother Shehbaz Sharif came to power as prime minister after a vote of no confidence was brought against former premier Imran Khan, there were changes in the senior leadership of the National Accountability Bureau, and Nawaz Sharif was acquitted in some 40-year old cases and declared a "political victim" in others.

=== Allegations of rigging in 2024 election ===
After Nawaz returned to Pakistan from London, he regained leadership over the Pakistan Muslim League (N) and launched an election campaign for a fourth term as Prime Minister in the 2024 Pakistani general election, allegedly using the Pakistan Armed Forces' support against the rival Pakistan Tehreek-e-Insaf (PTI).

He ran for a seat in the National Assembly from NA-130 Lahore-XIV against jailed PTI senior Yasmin Rashid. She officially gained 104,485 votes and lost her seat to Nawaz, who gained 179,310 according to the ECP, though major allegations of rigging surfaced for the constituency, as Rashid claimed she won the seat against Nawaz by a large margin. Yasmin Rashid stated that Nawaz had officially won the seat due to rigging committed by him, and had added 74,000 votes to his name in a form of major election manipulation. The civil society organization, PATTAN concluded that NA-130 would face the worst rigging prior to the elections and stated that the ECP had rigged the election in 'historic rigging' in favor of Nawaz using pre-prepared Form 47s. His party failed to win a simple majority and hence formed a coalition government under Nawaz's younger brother, Shehbaz Sharif.

=== Political engagement on Balochistan ===
In March 2025, Defence Minister Khawaja Asif stated that Nawaz Sharif was prepared to assist in addressing the deteriorating situation in Balochistan. On 9 April, a high-level delegation from the National Party (NP), led by party president Dr. Abdul Malik Baloch, met with Nawaz Sharif and senior Pakistan Muslim League (N) leaders in Lahore. The delegation urged Sharif to use his influence within the federal government to address the crisis in the province. Particular concern was raised over the Balochistan National Party (Mengal)'s ongoing sit-in protest and the recent arrests of women activists affiliated with the Baloch Yakjehti Committee, including its central organizer, Dr. Mahrang Baloch. Following the meeting, senior PML-N leader Khawaja Saad Rafique confirmed that Sharif had agreed to engage with regional political stakeholders to help address the situation.

== Personal life ==
Nawaz married Kulsoom Nawaz in April 1971. They have two sons and two daughters. His eldest daughter, Maryam Nawaz, has served as the chief minister of Punjab since 2024. Maryam is married to politician Muhammad Safdar Awan. His other daughter, Asma Nawaz, is married to Ali Dar, son of Ishaq Dar, Pakistan's former finance minister and current Minister for Foreign Affairs. His elder son, Hussain Nawaz, is a businessman based in Saudi Arabia and currently resides in Jeddah. His younger son, Hassan Nawaz, is also a businessman and lives in London.

Nawaz underwent open heart surgery in May 2016 in London. It was his second open-heart operation.

== Wealth ==
Following the 1998 nuclear tests and public frustration over economic sanctions, a Washington Post report stated that Nawaz paid $58.26 in income tax in 1994–95, the last year for which such information was available. It further stated that the Ittefaq Group increased in value from $5.4 million at the time Sharif first attained major political office, to about $217 million, an increase of 4,000% by 1998. The report also said that Sharif, along with two of his associates, had defaulted on $107 million in bank loans prior to returning to power. An official of United Bank Limited, Anis Khan, was quoted as saying that public trust in Sharif would depend on repayment of amounts owed to banks and tax authorities.

The same report highlighted significant government expenditures during his tenure, including a $24 million newly constructed office complex. It stated that the doors in the complex cost approximately $5,500, one table cost approximately $58,700, and bookshelves cost approximately $52,000. Maintenance and staffing costs for the prime minister's official residence were reported at approximately $163,000 per day, with the residence including facilities such as polo and cricket grounds, a gymnasium, and an Olympic-sized swimming pool.

According to documents submitted by Nawaz to the National Assembly of Pakistan in May 2016, he paid Rs2,000 in taxes in 1994, no income tax in 1995, and Rs50,000 in 1997. In 1999, he paid just $10 in income tax.

In 2011, Nawaz's assets were worth Rs 166 million, which increased to Rs 1.82 billion by 2013. In 2012 his net income was Rs. 12.4 million ($1.24 million). He was one of five billionaires elected to Pakistan's National Assembly in 2013. In 2015, his declared assets slightly decreased to ₨1.75 billion ($17.5 million). As of 2017 his net worth is over ₨1 billion.

According to the Election Commission of Pakistan, Nawaz is one of the wealthiest men in Pakistan, with an estimated net worth of at least Rs. 1.75 billion (equivalent to Rs. 8.9 billion or US$32 million in 2021).

The personal residence of the Sharif family, Raiwind Palace, is located in Jati Umra, Raiwind, on the outskirts of Lahore. He also has a residence in Jeddah, Saudi Arabia, known as the Sharif Villa, where he lived during his years in exile.

== Public image ==
Jon Boone wrote in The Guardian in 2013, that following his attempts to enact Sharia Law in the late 1990s, Nawaz had adopted a more centrist position by seeking diplomatic and trade relations with India which encouraged support from left-leaning Pakistanis. In another column, The Guardian described Nawaz's first two terms in the 1990s as authoritarian and clouded by allegations of corruption, but that "old foes and longstanding friends say Nawaz is a changed man" from when he originally entered politics "to defend family [business] interests".

Tim Craig, writing in March 2016 for The Washington Post, described Nawaz's move away from social conservatism as "traced to Sharif's ambitious economic agenda, the influence his 42-year-old daughter has over him, and his awareness that Pakistan remains the butt of jokes". Afrasiab Khattak summarized the shift by stating "[Nawaz] knows extremism is not good for business".

Leftist senator Raza Rabbani claimed that Nawaz "has always had these rightwing leanings", adding that "the temptation was there in the past to appease his rightwing Islamist constituency". Mohammed Hanif, writing in 2013, claimed that "if Nawaz weren't from the dominant province Punjab, where most of the army elite comes from, if he didn't represent the trading and business classes of Punjab, he would still be begging forgiveness for his sins in Saudi".

Author Edward A. Gargan, writing in November 1991, described Nawaz's government as "bedeviled by gossip, barraged by accusations of venality, castigated by the opposition and threatened by a final rupture of cordiality with the United States". The same year Najam Sethi described Nawaz's government as "corrupt, absolutely, astronomically corrupt, including the prime minister". In 2009, The New York Times wrote that "Bhutto and her Pakistan Peoples Party were considered more amenable allies for Washington" adding that "more nationalistic and religiously oriented, [Nawaz] and his party, the Pakistan Muslim League-N, have traditionally found common cause with the religious parties". Pervez Hoodbhoy described Nawaz as "a reflection of Pakistani society" adding that "he is silent on what matters most: the insurgency. What we need is a leader." Celia W. Dugger, writing in 1999, described Sharif's Raiwind Palace as "walls paneled in silken fabrics and rococo chairs laden with so much gold leaf they looked like they belonged in the court of Louis XIV or a bordello", drawing comparison between Nawaz's lifestyle and that of the "Mughals".

== In popular culture ==
- In the 1995 Pakistani series Zard Dopehar, the character "Malik Meharban Ali" portrayed by Shujaat Hashmi, a Lahori industrialist who rises in politics, was based on Nawaz Sharif.
- In the 2026 Indian film Dhurandhar: The Revenge he is portrayed by actor Mashhoor Amrohi.

== Books ==
Nawaz has published the following books:

- Model Town Ka Beta [The Son of Model Town], Model Town Publications, 2000, 298 p. Autobiography
- Ghaddar Kaun? Nawaz Sharif Ki Kahani Un Ki Zabani [The Traitor Within: The Nawaz Sharif Story In His Own Words], Sagar Publications, 2006, 456 p.

== See also ==
- Electoral history of Nawaz Sharif
- List of Ig Nobel Prize winners
- Muhammad Nawaz Sharif University of Agriculture
- Muhammad Nawaz Sharif University of Engineering & Technology
- Nawaz Sharif Medical College
- Nawaz Sharif Kidney Hospital Swat
- Nawaz Sharif Park
- Dawn leaks

== Notes ==
Political offices
Preceded by Sadiq Hussain Qureshi	Chief Minister of Punjab; 1985–1990	Succeeded by Ghulam Haider Wyne
Preceded by Ghulam Mustafa Jatoi; Acting	Prime Minister of Pakistan; 1990–1993	Succeeded by Balakh Sher Mazari; Acting
Preceded by Balakh Sher Mazari; Acting	Prime Minister of Pakistan; 1993	Succeeded by Moeenuddin Ahmad Qureshi; Acting
Preceded by Benazir Bhutto	Leader of the Opposition; 1993–1996	Succeeded by Benazir Bhutto
Preceded by Malik Meraj Khalid; Acting	Prime Minister of Pakistan; 1997–1999	Succeeded by Pervez Musharraf as Chief Executive of Pakistan
Preceded by Shahid Hamid; Acting	Minister of Defence; 1997–1999	Succeeded by Pervez Musharraf
Preceded by Sartaj Aziz	Minister of Finance; Acting; 1998	Succeeded by Ishaq Dar
Preceded by Mir Hazar Khan Khoso; Caretaker	Prime Minister of Pakistan; 2013–2017	Succeeded by Shahid Khaqan Abbasi
Preceded by Mir Hazar Khan Khoso; Caretaker	Minister of Defence; 2013	Succeeded by Khawaja Asif
Party political offices
Preceded by Fida Mohammad Khan	Leader of the Pakistan Muslim League-Nawaz; 1993–1999	Succeeded by Kalsoom Nawaz Sharif
Preceded by Shehbaz Sharif	Leader of the Pakistan Muslim League-Nawaz; 2011–2017	Succeeded by Sardar Yaqoob; Interim
Preceded by Sardar Yaqoob; Interim	Leader of the Pakistan Muslim League-Nawaz; 2017–2018	Succeeded by Shehbaz Sharif; Designate
