= Khalid Butt =

Khalid Butt may refer to:

- Shaheen Khalid Butt, Pakistani politician
- Osman Khalid Butt (born 1986), Pakistani actor
- Khalid Butt (actor)
- Khalid Butt (footballer), former football player and manager
