= Iqbal Raad =

Pakistani lawyer

Iqbal Raad was a Pakistani lawyer associated with the Pakistan Muslim League (N). He served as the Advocate General of Sindh until 1999. In 2000 he was one of the lead defense lawyers in the trial of ousted Pakistani prime minister Nawaz Sharif. On 10 March 2000 he was killed in his office in Karachi by three gunmen, while a fourth stood guard at the entrance to the building. He was 52 years old at the time of his death. He had received death threats during the trial of Nawaz Sharif. In 2005, ten Muttahida Qaumi Movement activists were acquitted of the murder.
