= Shaheen Khalid Butt =

Pakistani politician

Member of the Senate of Pakistan
- Incumbent
- Assumed office 12 March 2018

Personal details
- Party: PMLN

Shaheen Khalid Butt is a Pakistani politician and former military officer who has been a Member of the Senate of Pakistan since March 2018. He has also served as the managing director of the Pakistan Bait-ul-Mal since 2024. He is a retired captain from the Pakistan Army.

== Political career ==
He was nominated by Pakistan Muslim League (N) (PML-N) as its candidate in the 2018 Pakistani Senate election. However the Election Commission of Pakistan declared all PML-N candidates for the Senate election as independent after a ruling of the Supreme Court of Pakistan.

Butt was elected to the Senate of Pakistan as an independent candidate on general seat from Punjab in the Senate election. He was backed in the election by PML-N and joined the treasury benches, led by PML-N after getting elected. He took oath as Senator on 12 March 2018.
