= Pakistan Bait-ul-Mal =

Pakistani charitable governmental organisation

- پاکستان بیت المال
- Abbreviation: PBM
- Type: Charity organisation
- Location: Pakistan
- Region served: Pakistan
- Key people: Shaheen Khalid Butt (MD)
- Parent organization: Government of Pakistan
- Website: pbm.gov.pk

Pakistan Bait-ul-Mal (PBM) (Urdu: پاکستان بیت المال) is an autonomous charity organisation which operates under the Prime Minister's Secretariat.

== History ==
Pakistan Bait-ul-Mal was established in February 1992 during the first Nawaz Sharif government. The Bait-ul-Mal Act was signed into law by President Ghulam Ishaq Khan in 1991.

== Funding ==
Its funding sources include the Central Zakat Fund and federal government allocations.

In the fiscal year 2013, the Bait-ul-Mal disbursed Rs 6,186.4 million to 147,361 beneficiaries. It also approved the creation of senior care homes known as Ehsaas Kadaa. In 2009 and 2010, it allocated Rs 635 million to assist internally displaced persons in Jalozai, Mardan, and Swabi during military operations in Malakand and Swat.

== Programs ==
Pakistan Bait-ul-Mal focuses on supporting widows, orphans, the disabled, students, and the elderly, providing financial aid such as Rs 25,000 per household with more than one disabled person. It is also the sponsor of Benazir Income Support Programme. It also provides money to poor and deserving students of almost all universities of Pakistan.

== Sweet Homes ==
The Pakistan Bait-ul-Mal operates twelve Sweet Homes that function as both residences and schools for orphans. These facilities are situated in Attock, Kohat, Mansehra, Mardan, and Swat in Khyber Pakhtunkhwa; Dipalpur, Gujrat, and Sargodha in Punjab; Karachi and Nawabshah in Sindh; Quetta and Zhob in Balochistan, Pakistan.
