= Pakistan–South Korea Free Trade Agreement =

Proposed treaty

South Korea-Pakistan Free Trade Agreement is a proposed free trade agreement between Pakistan and South Korea.

The free trade agreement was proposed by Pakistani Minister for Commerce Khurram Dastgir Khan to Seoul in 2015. Both the countries agreed to conduct research studies on its feasibility, which were completed in 2016. On September 22, 2016, Republic of Korea Ambassador Dr Dong-gu Suh and Commerce Minister Khurram Dastgir Khan announced that the two sides have agreed to push forward the agreement process in light of positive feasibility.

== See also ==
- Pakistan–South Korea relations
