= Saudi Arabia–Turkey relations =

- Saudi Arabia: Turkey

Diplomatic mission
- Embassy of Saudi Arabia, Ankara: Embassy of Turkey, Riyadh

Relations between Saudi Arabia and Turkey have long fluctuated between cooperation to enmity. Since the 19th century, the two nations have always had a complicated relationship. While Turkey and Saudi Arabia are major economic partners, the two have periods of friendly and tense political relationship, stemming partially from the historic enmity. Currently, relations between the two countries have grown significantly stronger, despite their differing geopolitical interests.

Saudi Arabia has an embassy in Ankara and a consulate general in Istanbul, and Turkey has an embassy in Riyadh and a consulate general in Jeddah. Both countries are members of the World Trade Organization, G20 and the Organisation of Islamic Cooperation.

According to a 2013 Pew global opinion poll, 26% of Turks express a favourable view of Saudi Arabia while 53% express an unfavourable view. After the Arab Spring, tensions between Saudi Arabia and Turkey mounted, with an increasing proxy conflict emerging between the two states. The relations began to significantly recover after the end of the Qatar diplomatic crisis, driven by mutual interests in countering Iranian influence. Bilateral relations subsequently improved following the signing of the Mecca Defence Alliance, a trilateral pact established on August 7, 2026, between Pakistan, Saudi Arabia, and Turkey.

== Historical background ==
Historically, the relationship between Turkey and Saudi Arabia has always varied between cooperation and distrust to uncertainty and rapprochement. This is because of the historical enmity between the two nations dated from the Ottoman era.

In the 19th century, the Ottomans entered into a serious conflict with House of Saud, the first Saudi state which resulted in the Ottoman–Saudi War. The war is seen in Saudi Arabia as the first attempt to create an independent state from the Ottoman Empire, while in Turkey, it is often considered to be the war against the Salafi movement. This led to a brutal military reprisal by the Ottoman rulers, which saw the destruction of the First Saudi State and the executions of many religious leaders of the Saudis. For this reason, there is an eternal enmity between the Turks and the Saudis, which is reflected by recent revisionist campaigns in both countries. The Ottoman Empire's collapse following the World War I would eventually lead to the Saudi resurgence and future establishment of modern Saudi Arabia.

The Hashimite rulers of the Hejaz pledged allegiance to the Ottoman Sultan in 1517 following the Ottoman conquest of Egypt, placing the holy cities of Mecca and Medina under Ottoman Protection until the Arab revolt in 1916 when Sharif Hussayn of Mecca expelled them with the aid of Britain. This success was short-lived however, and soon the Saudis expelled the Hashemites from both cities and most of the Hejaz; reducing Hashemite's hegemony to the modern Kingdom of Jordan (though Hashemite monarchs ruled Iraq for several decades in the mid 20th century).

== Modern history ==
=== Early beginnings ===
In October 1926, Shevket Bey arrived in Jeddah (within the Saudi-ruled Kingdom of Hejaz and Nejd) as the first "Diplomatic Representative of the Turkish Republic". On presenting his papers, Bey "recalled the old associations, based on brotherhood and co-operation, which formerly existed between Turks and Arabs, and said he hoped that such noble memories would find new expression in the revived friendship between the two governments". However, privately he considered the country "savage" and its inhabitants "nothing less than barbarians", and lamented the "evil day" that brought him to the Hejaz.

Formal relations between Turkey and Saudi Arabia began in 1932, after the creation of the new Kingdom of Saudi Arabia. At the first stage of the relations, Saudi Arabia and Turkey shared a cordial relationship as Turkish leader Mustafa Kemal Atatürk was interested in keeping Turkey safe and friendly with the international community, and tried to avoid religious discord. Both Turkey and Saudi Arabia maintained neutrality during World War II.

In the 1950s, during the Cold War, Turkey joined the short-lived Baghdad Pact, an anti-communist military alliance, while Saudi Arabia, despite also sharing similar views, declined to participate and criticized the pact for its ineffectiveness to deal with the Soviet Union.

With the eruption of Iranian Revolution in 1979 and subsequent Iran–Iraq War, both Turkey and Saudi Arabia were the main supporters of Saddam Hussein's Iraq, albeit Turkey quietly supported Iraq and was skeptical to the Shia clergy ruling Iran despite maintaining a neutral face, while Saudi Arabia openly supported Iraq with lethal weapons and finance. In April 1979, Saudi Arabia provided financial assistance ($250 million) to Turkey to help the latter's attempts to overcome the ongoing economical and financial crisis.

In 1991, with the outbreak of Gulf War, Turkey and Saudi Arabia supported the United States against Iraq, although Turkey didn't participate in the coalition, Ankara opened its air space to aid the coalition, while Saudi Arabia was part of the coalition. Also in the 1990s decade, Turkey and Saudi Arabia were sympathetic to the Chechen Republic of Ichkeria against Russia, but did not recognize it.

Both Ankara and Riyadh were not friendly to Saddam's Iraq. In 2003, however, both Turkey and Saudi Arabia openly opposed the invasion of Iraq.

=== Since 2010s ===
==== From friend to foe ====
Turkey and Saudi Arabia initially found themselves in alliance when the Arab Spring erupted, mostly because of the Syrian civil war as Ankara and Riyadh were openly opposing Bashar al-Assad, and thus Saudi Arabia and Turkey both financed various anti-Assad forces in the conflict hoping to drive the Syrian dictator out. However, Turkey also demonstrated support for Muslim Brotherhood (MB), which was opposed by Saudi Arabia, and this had created an uneasy sentiment among Riyadh. In 2013, the Egyptian coup broke out when MB member and then-President of Egypt, Mohamed Morsi, was forcibly removed by pro-Saudi Abdel Fattah el-Sisi, Turkey had condemned the move, but it was the first sign of divergence between Ankara and Riyadh.

In October 2014, Saudi Arabia successfully campaigned against a Turkish bid for non-permanent membership of the United Nations Security Council due to Saudi opposition to the Turkish stance on the MB.

==== Qatar diplomatic crisis and the beginning of the tensions ====
Due to the 2017 Qatar diplomatic crisis, the relationship between Turkey and Saudi Arabia faced problems, with Turkey supporting Qatar against Saudi Arabia in the ongoing diplomatic dispute.

Geoeconomics expert M. Nicolas J. Firzli has argued that the Turkish government has sought to use the crisis to its own advantage, by advancing an expansionist Neo-Ottoman agenda at the expense of the Gulf Cooperation Council:

Turkey and a resurgent Iran for their part are cynically using the festering crisis to advance a distinct agenda: rebuilding military and economic beachheads along the ‘eastern flank’ of the Arabian Peninsula from Oman to Southern Iraq, a part of the world from which they were forced out by the Royal Navy in 1917, precisely one hundred years ago. The local chess board is getting crowded with too many avid players, at a time when many British and American policy makers seem to have lost interest in that part of the world: this doesn’t bode well for the long-term stability of the MENA.

Saudi Arabia, in response, has threatened to impose sanctions against Turkey, and has conducted discussions with the UAE on the topic of curbing "Turkish expansionist policy". In turn, Turkish President Recep Tayyip Erdoğan accused Saudi Arabia of being non-Islamic and heretics.

On 1 March 2018, Saudi Arabia's MBC channels stopped broadcasting Turkish soap operas dubbed in Arabic to achieve the highest Arab interest.

In March 2018, Saudi Crown Prince Mohammad bin Salman referred to Turkey as part of a "triangle of evil" alongside Iran and Muslim Brotherhood.

In August 2018, Turkey backed Saudi Arabia in its dispute with Canada, rejecting the Canadian actions as a "form of interference in other countries’ internal affairs".

==== Murder of Jamal Khashoggi ====
On 2 October 2018, Saudi journalist and The Washington Post writer Jamal Khashoggi was killed in the Saudi Arabian consulate in Istanbul; the move was considered as a turning point on the future hostility between Turkey and Saudi Arabia. It has been widely alleged that he was killed by the Saudi government, including by Erdogan—although Erdogan at first refrained from criticizing Saudi Arabia directly and instead suggested the blame lies with Crown Prince Mohammad bin Salman.

After the incident, Prince Mohammad rejected the concept of a rift with Turkey, stating, "Many are trying to … drive a wedge between Saudi Arabia and Turkey. … They will not be able to do it as long as there is a King Salman, a Mohammad bin Salman and a President Erdogan."

Almost a month after Khashoggi's death, Erdogan directly accused the Saudi government of murdering the journalist. Erdogan said, "We know that the order to kill Khashoggi came from the highest levels of the Saudi government." He also said that "the puppet masters behind Khashoggi's killing" would be exposed. Yasin Aktay, a Turkish official and adviser to Erdogan believes Khashoggi's body was dissolved in acid after being dismembered. He said, "The reason they dismembered Khashoggi's body was to dissolve his remains more easily. Now we see that they did not only dismember his body but also vaporised it."

==== Further deterioration ====
Turkey and Saudi Arabia also clash for influence regarding other Muslim countries, notably Sudan. Sudan was once a former ally of Iran, but has cut off relations with Iran since 2015 to support Saudi Arabia's war efforts in Yemen. However, Sudanese fear of Saudi Arabian influence facilitated then-dictator Omar al-Bashir to get closer to Turkey, resulting in the lease of Suakin to Turkish contractors. According from Turkish media, Saudi Arabia has been deeply skeptical over Turkish presence in Sudan, out of fear that Turkey is attempting to take Sudan away from Saudi influence and threaten Saudi Arabia's security.

Saudi Arabia condemned the 2019 Turkish offensive into north-eastern Syria. In response, Erdogan criticised the death toll in the Saudi-led intervention in the Yemeni civil war.

The movie Kingdoms of Fire, aired by MBC in 2019, was partially financed by Saudi Arabia, further exacerbated by the portrayal of the Ottoman Turks as violent, ruthless and uncivilized people. This had drawn criticism in Turkey.

Turkey and Saudi Arabia have also clashed vying for influence in the Libyan Civil War. Turkey has been throwing significant support to the Islamist-backed Government of National Accord in Tripoli, but Saudi Arabia, along with Egypt and the UAE, has supported Khalifa Haftar's House of Representatives in Tobruk. The Turkish actions has gained minor diplomatic support from Iran, which deepened the mistrust with Saudi Arabia.

The 2020 Baghdad International Airport airstrike, where Iranian general Qasem Soleimani was assassinated by the United States, had revealed the complicated nature of the relationship between Saudi Arabia and Turkey, with both countries secretly approving the airstrike with hope to remove a grave threat from Iran to both countries' ambitions in the Middle East.

In February 2020, Saudi Foreign Minister Adel al-Jubeir accused Turkey of financing and sponsoring the "extremist militias" in Somalia, Libya and Syria, Saudi Arabia also moved to block all Turkish websites in Saudi Arabia. In response, Ankara announced it would block all Saudi and Emirati websites in the country.

In September 2020, during the 2020 Nagorno-Karabakh conflict, Saudi Arabian TV channel Al Arabiya had broadcast the speech of Armenian President Armen Sargsyan accusing Turkey and Azerbaijan of inflaming the conflict. In response, Turkish leader Erdoğan accused Arab countries of destabilising peace in Middle East and Caucasus, causing anti-Turkish sentiment to spread in Saudi Arabia as Saudi officials called for boycott against Turkish goods. This was rebutted by the Saudi who said they were committed to international treaties relating to trade. But the boycott seemed to have caused serious inflictions into the trade, as Maersk advised his clients to be aware of the Saudi ban on Turkish goods, and also Turkish business associations in Turkey appealed to the Turkish Government to find a solution for the conflict. It appeared that not only Turkish goods are targeted but also products "Made in Turkey" from foreign companies.

==== Armenia ====
Saudi Arabia had traditionally supported Turkey over the Armenian genocide. However, due to the increasing deterioration of Saudi–Turkish relations, Saudi Arabia has started to raise the Armenian issue. In 2019, Saudi Arabia agreed to sponsor recognition of the genocide in the United States Congress, whereby Saudi Princess Reema bint Bandar Al Saud, Saudi Arabia's first female ambassador to the United States, condemned Turkey. The genocide has been formally recognized by the United States in statements, resolutions, and legal submissions several times, including in 1951, 1975, 1984, and 1996, before being officially recognized in a resolution in both houses in 2019 United States resolution on Armenian Genocide. However, Saudi Arabia does not officially recognize Armenian Genocide.

==== Israel ====
In August 2020, Mossad's chief Yossi Cohen, on his statement to the Saudi, Egyptian and Emirati counterparts, had openly named Turkey as a new threat for the peace of the region, and even further single out a number of allies Turkey would gain potential support like Azerbaijan and Qatar, the former has strong relations with Israel since 1990s. Both Saudi Arabia, Israel, Greece, Egypt and the United Arab Emirates have viewed Turkish expansionism under Recep Tayyip Erdoğan represent a new danger for the Middle East since 2018, due to ongoing conflicts with Turkey in Syria, Iraq, Sudan and Libya, with Saudi expert Saud al-Sarhan viewing it as mirroring the Ottoman pan-Islamist policies in World War I.

==== Palestine ====
In an interview in October 2020, Saudi Prince and former Saudi ambassador to the United States, Bandar bin Sultan Al Saud, blasted the Palestinian leadership for its incompetence as well as singling Turkey, alongside Iran, accusing Ankara of abusing the Palestinian cause for Turkish profits. The Turkish government of Erdoğan has recently lashed out Saudi Arabia and other Arab states for betraying Palestine.

=== Since 2020s ===
==== Turkish Super Cup controversy ====
The Turkish Football Federation reached an agreement with Saudi Arabia to host the 2023 Turkish Super Cup between Galatasaray and Fenerbahçe. The match was scheduled to take place at the Al-Awwal Park in Riyadh, in December 2023. This decision, however, sparked significant backlash from Turkish fans as they strongly advocated for the intercontinental derby, recognized as the biggest football match in Turkey, to be played in Turkey in commemoration of the 100th Anniversary of the Republic of Turkey.

Fenerbahçe and Galatasaray, requested to warm up wearing t-shirts featuring Mustafa Kemal Atatürk, and carrying banners with his quotes such as "Peace at Home, Peace in the World" and "How happy is the one who says I am a Turk", in the opening ceremony. However, Saudi Arabian officials, citing international regulations and agreements previously made with the Turkish Football Federation, refused to incorporate these requests into the existing protocol before the match. In response to this disagreement, both sides refused to play, resulting in the cancellation of the match. The clubs' decision not to play received widespread support across Turkey.

Erdogan blamed the Turkish opposition for harming relations between Saudi Arabia and Turkey, Erdogan defended Saudi Arabia as a brotherly country and an important trade partner.

==== Reconciliation ====
Following the election of Joe Biden as president of the United States in November 2020, Saudi Arabia, whose government had been given a free hand by the Donald Trump administration, and Turkey, whose economy had been additionally hit by Saudi Arabia's unofficial trade embargo on Turkish goods, appeared to make tentative attempts at rapprochement. However, Turkey's support of the Muslim Brotherhood combined with Saudi Arabia's emerging alliance with Egypt and the United Arab Emirates, the two fellow Arab nations that had been openly hostile to Turkey, and also with Israel, Cyprus and Greece, were said to make prospects of such rapprochement dubious. Azerbaijan relations with Saudi Arabia also deteriorated but Azerbaijan relations with Turkey remain close.

In the beginning of 2021, Turkey's leadership was especially concerned and alarmed by rapprochement between Saudi Arabia and Greece, Turkey's arch-enemy in the Eastern Mediterranean. Turkey's hopes for reconciliation with Saudi Arabia were believed to have been dashed in mid-March 2021, as Saudi F-15C fighter jets landed in the Greek island of Crete to participate in a training exercise with Greece, a move being seen as Saudi Arabia's response in kind to Turkey's policies in Saudi Arabia's neighbourhood.

According to CNN, Turkey's president Erdogan said in January 2022 that his first visit to Saudi Arabia since 2017 will be in February 2022. President Erdogan visited Saudi Arabia on 23 June 2022 and met Mohammed bin Salman and they want to boost their economic relations. Emirati-Turkish reconciliation in 2021, followed by Turkey's decision to move Khashoggi case to the Saudi judicial system and lack of support from Biden administration to Saudi Arabia, paved a way for Saudi-Turkish reconciliation efforts. Following the talks between Saudi Crown Prince Mohammed bin Salman and Turkey's President Tayyip Erdogan in June, the two countries said they discussed improving relations and investment in sectors from energy to defence among others. Saudi Arabia pledged to increase its assistance and boost Turkish economy aftermath of the 2023 Turkey–Syria earthquake.

Relations between the two countries continued to improve following the overthrow of Bashar al-Assad, aimed at limiting Iranian influence. Although Syria was readmitted to the Arab League, the Saudis remained uneasy about Assad's ties to both Iran and the Houthis in Yemen.

Saudi Arabia and Turkey have both shown interest in BRICS, but neither has officially joined as of 2025. Saudi Arabia was invited to join as a full member.

Cooperation between the two countries grew in 2026, and on August 7, they concluded an alliance treaty with Pakistan under the name Mecca Defence Alliance.

== Cooperation against Iran ==
Turkey has played a very edgy role in the Iran–Saudi Arabia proxy conflict. Turkey is engaged in a separate proxy conflict with Iran, which backs anti-Turkish forces in Syria, Iraq, Libya, the South Caucasus, and other regions. Saudi Arabia and Turkey are both nearly completely Sunni, but their experiences over the Salafist movement, rivalry over leadership of the Islamic world, and a recent neo-Ottoman outlook in Turkey has caused extreme distrust between the two countries. Turkey has rejected Saudi requests to join the Yemeni Civil War, but Turkey supports the Saudi-backed government in Yemen. Turkey and Saudi Arabia often fluctuate between antagonism and alliance. During the Syrian Civil War, Turkey and Saudi Arabia support the Syrian opposition against the Iranian-backed President Bashar al-Assad, but Turkey has sought to back the moderate forces, and Saudi Arabia has supported the radicals in the opposition and so tensions are caused between both countries. The Russian intervention forces Turkey and Saudi Arabia to have a level of compromise, but mutual distrust has hampered the process.

Turkey has been traditionally refrained from funding Islamic schools, but since the 2010s, it has increasingly funded Islamic schools and resulted in the Saudi perception that Turkey is attempting to eradicate Saudi-funded madrasah. Turkey is attempting to limit Iranian influence but also similarly dislikes Saudi influence.

Since the start of the Russian invasion of Ukraine, both Turkey and Saudi Arabia have deepened their economic ties with Russia, possibly as a counterbalance to Iran's influence on Russia.

Both Turkey and Saudi Arabia supported Syrian opposition's victory against Bashar al-Assad. Both countries were against Iran's influence in Syria. Saudi Arabia and Turkey were among the first countries to welcome the new administration in Syria.

In May 2025, the Trump administration agreed to remove American sanctions on Syria after meeting Ahmed al-Sharaa in Riyadh. Trump said that after discussing the situation with Mohammed bin Salman and Erdoğan (joined the meeting via video call), he decided to lift sanctions on Syria. Unlike the previous Biden administration, President Trump maintains good relations with Mohammed bin Salman and Erdoğan. It was in the interest of both countries, as well as the United States, to focus on counter-terrorism and going against Iranian threats.

In June 2026, it was reported that both countries signed a new transportation agreement including railway development and cooperation. The agreement aims to improve trade and connectivity between the countries.

== Resident diplomatic missions ==
- Saudi Arabia has an embassy in Ankara and a consulate-general in Istanbul.
- Turkey has an embassy in Riyadh and a consulate-general in Jeddah.

== See also ==
- Foreign relations of Saudi Arabia
- Foreign relations of Turkey
- Turks in Saudi Arabia
- Arabs in Turkey
