= List of treaties of Turkey =

Below is the list of notable international treaties signed by the government of Turkey (Between 23 April 1920 and 29 October 1923 as the government of Turkish parliament and after 29 October 1923 as the government of Republic of Turkey)

Pre-republican era:

Date	Name of the treaty	Signatories (other than Turkey)
3 December 1920	Treaty of Alexandropol (Gyumri)	Armenia
9 March 1921	Cilicia Peace Treaty	France
16 March 1921	Treaty of Moscow	Soviet Union
13 October 1921	Treaty of Kars	Armenian SSR, Azerbaijan SSR, Georgian SSR
20 October 1921	Treaty of Ankara	France
11 October 1922	Armistice of Mudanya	United Kingdom, France, Italy
24 July 1923	Treaty of Lausanne	United Kingdom, France, Italy, Japan, Greece, Romania, Yugoslavia

Republican era:

Date	Name of the treaty	Signatories (other than Turkey)
9 February 1934	Balkan Pact	Greece, Romania, Yugoslavia
20 July 1936	Montreux Convention	United Kingdom, France, Italy, Romania, Soviet Union, Ukraine, Greece, Yugoslavia, Japan
8 July 1937	Treaty of Saadabad	Iran, Iraq, Afghanistan
14 September 1937	Nyon Arrangement	United Kingdom, Bulgaria, Egypt, France, Greece, Romania, Soviet Union, Yugoslavia
18 June 1941	German–Turkish; Treaty of Friendship	Germany
26 February 1955	Baghdad Pact (later CENTO)	United Kingdom, Iran, Iraq, Pakistan
11 February 1959 19 February 1959	London and Zürich Agreements	United Kingdom, Greece
12 September 1963	Ankara Agreement	European Common Market
21 July 1964	RCD Treaty	Iran, Pakistan
25 June 1992	Bosporus Statement	Albania, Armenia, Azerbaijan, Bulgaria, Georgia, Greece, Moldova, Romania, Russia, Ukraine
17 July 2003	ECO Treaty	Afghanistan, Azerbaijan, Iran, Kazakhstan, Kyrgyzstan, Pakistan, Tajikistan, Turkmenistan, Uzbekistan
16 August 2010	Agreement on Strategic Partnership and Mutual Support	Azerbaijan
7 August 2026	Mecca Defence Alliance	Saudi Arabia, Pakistan
21 October 2026	Badr Memorandum of Understanding	Pakistan, Qatar, Indonesia
