= Defense pact =

Military alliance in which countries agree to come to each other's defense

A defense pact (Commonwealth spelling: defence pact) is a type of treaty or military alliance in which the signatories promise to support each other militarily and to defend each other. Generally, the signatories point out the threats and concretely prepare to respond to it together.

Current mutual defence treaties and alliances
| Year in force | Name | | Member states | |
| Year in force | Treaty name | Also known as | Present members | Former / suspended members |
|---|---|---|---|---|
| 1947 | Inter-American Treaty of Reciprocal Assistance | Rio Treaty; TIAR | Argentina; The Bahamas (1982–present); Brazil; Chile; Colombia; Costa Rica; Dominican Republic; El Salvador; Guatemala; Haiti; Honduras; Panama; Paraguay; Peru; Trinidad and Tobago (1967–present); United States; Uruguay (1948–2019, 2020–present); Venezuela (1948–2015, 2019–present) | Cuba (1948–1962; suspended); Bolivia (1948–2014); Ecuador (1948–2016); Mexico (1948–2004); Nicaragua (1948–2014) |
| 1949 | North Atlantic Treaty | Washington Treaty; NATO | Albania (2009); Belgium; Bulgaria (2004); Canada; Croatia (2009); Czech Republic (1999); Denmark; Estonia (2004); Finland (2023); France; Germany (1955; as West Germany; reunified territory covered from 1990); Greece (1952); Hungary (1999); Iceland; Italy; Latvia (2004); Lithuania (2004); Luxembourg; Montenegro (2017); Netherlands; North Macedonia (2020); Norway; Poland (1999); Portugal; Romania (2004); Slovakia (2004); Slovenia (2004); Spain (1982); Sweden (2024); Turkey (1952); United Kingdom; United States | |
| 1951 | Mutual Defense Treaty (United States–Philippines) | | Philippines; United States | |
| 1951 | ANZUS | Australia, New Zealand, United States Security Treaty | Australia; New Zealand; United States | |
| 1953 | Mutual Defense Treaty (United States–South Korea) | | South Korea; United States | |
| 1960 | Treaty of Mutual Cooperation and Security between the United States and Japan | | Japan; United States | |
| 1961 | Sino-North Korean Mutual Aid and Cooperation Friendship Treaty | Sino-North Korean Treaty of Friendship, Co-operation and Mutual Assistance | China; North Korea | |
| 1962 | Thanat–Rusk communiqué | | Thailand; United States | |
| 1992 | Collective Security Treaty Organization | CSTO; Collective Security Treaty | Armenia (Frozen Membership); Belarus; Kazakhstan; Kyrgyzstan; Russia; Tajikistan | Azerbaijan (1994–1999); Georgia (1994–1999); Uzbekistan (1994–1999, 2006–2012) |
| 2000 | The Joint Defence Agreement of the Cooperation Council for the Arab States of the Gulf (CCASG) | GCC Joint Defence Agreement | Bahrain; Kuwait; Oman; Qatar; Saudi Arabia; United Arab Emirates | |
| 2008 | South African Development Community (SADC) Mutual Defence Pact | | Botswana; Eswatini; Lesotho; Mauritius; Mozambique; Namibia; South Africa; Zambia; Zimbabwe | |
| 2009 | Treaty of Lisbon (Common Security and Defence Policy provisions) | CSDP; European Union mutual defence clause (Article 42.7 TEU) | Austria; Belgium; Bulgaria; Croatia; Cyprus; Czech Republic; Denmark; Estonia; Finland; France; Germany; Greece; Hungary; Ireland; Italy; Latvia; Lithuania; Luxembourg; Malta; Netherlands; Poland; Portugal; Romania; Slovakia; Slovenia; Spain; Sweden | United Kingdom (left the EU in 2020) |
| 2010 | Agreement on Strategic Partnership and Mutual Support | | Azerbaijan; Turkey | |
| 2021 | Franco-Greek defence agreement | | France; Greece | |
| 2021 | AUKUS | | Australia; United Kingdom; United States | |
| 2023 | Alliance of Sahel States | AES | Burkina Faso; Mali; Niger | |
| 2024 | North Korean–Russian Treaty on Comprehensive Strategic Partnership | | North Korea; Russia | |
| 2025 | Strategic Mutual Defence Agreement | SMDA | Pakistan; Saudi Arabia | |
| 2025 | Pukpuk Treaty | Papua New Guinea–Australia Mutual Defence Treaty | Australia; Papua New Guinea | |
| 2026 | Ocean of Peace Alliance | Veitacini Treaty | Australia; Fiji | |
| 2026 | Mecca Defence Alliance | Mecca Joint Defence Agreement | Pakistan; Saudi Arabia; Turkey | |
| 2026 | Shield of the Americas | Americas Counter Cartel Coalition | United States; Argentina; Bahamas; Belize; Bolivia; Chile; Colombia; Costa Rica; Dominican Republic; Ecuador; El Salvador; Guatemala; Guyana; Honduras; Jamaica; Panama; Paraguay; Peru; Trinidad and Tobago | |

== Historical treaties ==
| Year | Treaty name | Member States |
|---|---|---|
| 1778–1798 | Treaty of Alliance | Kingdom of France ( French First Republic from 1792); United States |
| 1873–1887 | League of the Three Emperors | German Empire; Austria-Hungary; (Russia) Russian Empire |
| 1921–1938 | Little Entente | France; Czechoslovakia; Romania; Yugoslavia |
| 1934–1941 | Balkan Pact | Greece; Turkey; Romania; Yugoslavia |
| 1950–1979 | Sino-Soviet Treaty of Friendship, Alliance and Mutual Assistance | China; Soviet Union |
| 1954–1977 | Southeast Asia Treaty Organization | Australia; France; New Zealand; Pakistan (withdrew in 1973); Philippines; Thailand; United Kingdom; United States |
| 1955–1979 | Central Treaty Organization | Iran; Iraq (withdrew in 1959); Pakistan; Turkey; United Kingdom |
| 1955–1979 | Sino-American Mutual Defense Treaty | Taiwan; United States |
| 1955–1991 | Warsaw Pact | Albania (withdrew in 1968); Bulgaria; Czechoslovakia; East Germany; Hungary; Poland; Romania; Soviet Union |

== See also ==
- Military alliance
- List of military alliances
