= Powers of the president of Turkey =

Constitutional, legal, and soft powers

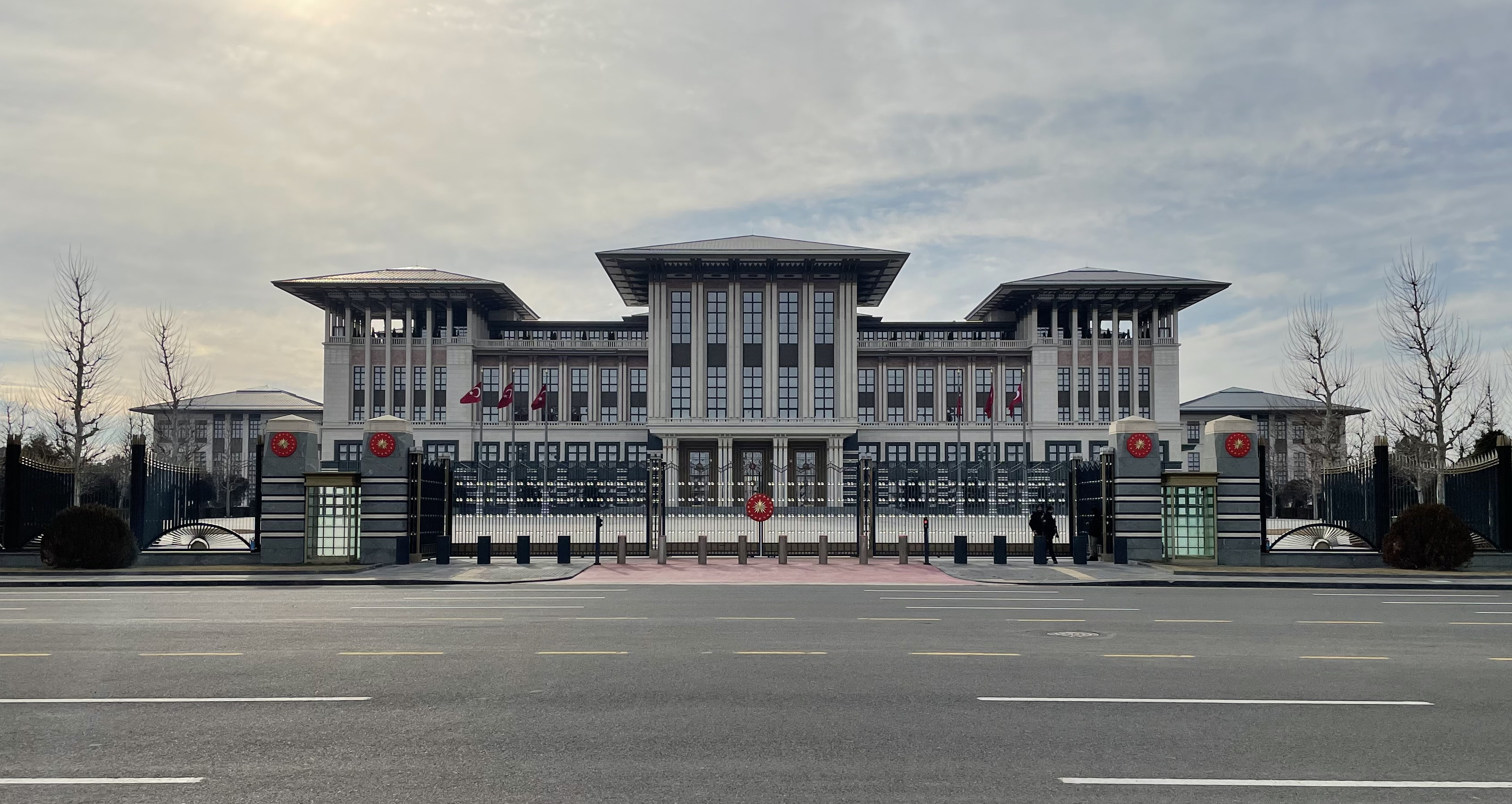
The office of the President

The powers of the president of Turkey are primarily defined by the Constitution of Turkey. Part 2, Chapter 2 of the Constitution, entitled "Executive Power", sets out presidential authority. The President holds a pivotal position within the country's political framework, commanding a blend of ceremonial and executive powers that significantly influence the governance of the nation.

== Constitutional framework ==
The powers and responsibilities vested in the President of Turkey are primarily delineated by the Constitution of Turkey. Enacted in 1982 following a period of military rule, and heavily amended following a 2017 referendum which replaced the parliamentary system with a presidential one, the constitution sets forth the authority of the president within the framework of the Turkish Republic, establishing the parameters of their role and influence.

== Executive Authority ==
=== Appointment of Ministers ===
One of the key executive prerogatives of the President is the appointment of ministers to the Cabinet. Historically, this process operated through the recommendation of the Prime Minister. However, constitutional reforms in 2017 abolished the position of Prime Minister, thereby granting the President direct authority to appoint ministers, consolidating the executive branch.

=== Executive decree ===
The President possesses the authority to issue executive orders, which carry the weight of law, particularly in matters concerning executive functions and the implementation of legislation. These orders serve as a mechanism for the President to enact policy decisions swiftly, subject to subsequent judicial scrutiny to ensure conformity with constitutional principles and existing legal frameworks.

=== Commander-in-chief ===
The president is the commander-in-chief of the Turkish Armed Forces and may exercise supreme operational command and control over them. The president has, in this capacity, plenary power to launch, direct and supervise military operations, order or authorize the deployment of troops and form military policy with the Ministry of National Defense and the National Security Council. However, the constitutional ability to declare war is vested only in Parliament.

=== Declaration of state of emergency ===
In times of national crisis or emergency, the President holds the power to declare a state of emergency, either nationwide or in specific regions of the country. Such declarations confer upon the President expanded executive powers, including the ability to issue decrees with the force of law, enabling decisive action to address urgent challenges and maintain public order. The declariation is subject to the approval of the Parliament (in a state of emergency, the presidential decree requires parliamentary approval).

== Powers related to legislation ==
=== Veto authority ===
The President possesses the prerogative to veto legislation passed by the Grand National Assembly, Turkey's unicameral legislature. While the veto serves as a potent check on legislative initiatives, it is subject to potential override by a simple majority vote in the Assembly, underscoring the delicate balance of power between the executive and legislative branches.

=== Legislative initiative ===
Although the primary responsibility for initiating legislation lies with the Grand National Assembly, the President retains the right to propose legislation to the Assembly, thereby exerting influence over the legislative agenda and shaping the direction of policy initiatives.

== Diplomatic Role ==
=== Representation in Foreign Affairs ===
As the head of state, the President of Turkey assumes a significant role in representing the country's interests on the international stage. They have the authority to negotiate and sign treaties on behalf of Turkey, subject to subsequent ratification by the Assembly, thus playing a pivotal role in shaping the nation's foreign policy agenda.

=== International engagement ===
The President engages in diplomatic initiatives, forging relationships with foreign leaders and participating in international forums and summits, thereby advancing Turkey's diplomatic objectives and fostering cooperation on global issues of mutual concern. The president can also ratify and promulgate international treaties.

== Judicial appointments ==
The President plays an important role in the appointment of high-ranking judicial officials. The president appoints twelve of the fifteen members of the Constitutional Court, one-fourth of the members of the Council of State, the Chief Public Prosecutor and the Deputy Chief Public Prosecutor of the Court of Cassation and four out of 13 members of the Council of Judges and Prosecutors. These appointments have significant implications for the functioning of the judiciary and the protection of the rule of law within the country.

== Constraints and oversight ==
Despite the considerable powers vested in the President, the Turkish political system incorporates mechanisms to ensure accountability and prevent the abuse of authority. The principle of checks and balances underscores the role of other branches of government, including the judiciary and the legislature, in providing oversight and maintaining the integrity of democratic governance. A simple majority in the parliament can call for new presidential elections.

== See also ==
- Powers of the president of the United States
- Powers of the president of Singapore
- Powers of the prime minister of the United Kingdom
