= Toossi =

Toossi is a surname of Iranian origin. Notable people with this surname include:

- Sanaz Toossi (born 1991/92), American playwright and screenwriter
- Sina Toossi, Iranian-American writer, editor and researcher

== See also ==
- Toosi, village in Estonia
- Toosii, American rapper
