= Azerbaijan–Saudi Arabia relations =

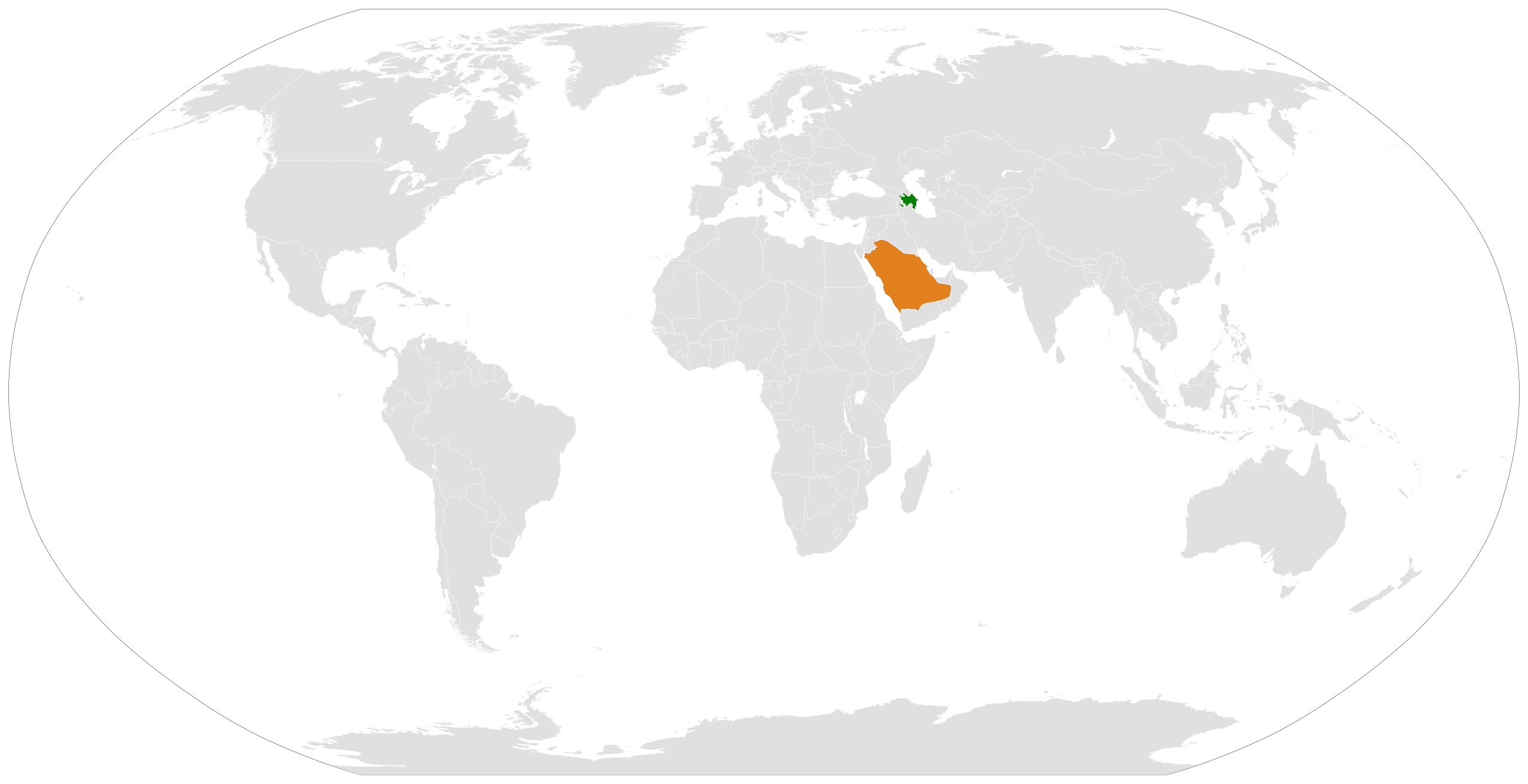

- Azerbaijan: Saudi Arabia

Azerbaijan–Saudi Arabia relations are the bilateral relations between Azerbaijan and Saudi Arabia.

== Diplomatic relations ==
The Republic of Azerbaijan and the Kingdom of Saudi Arabia have a diplomatic relationship since February 24, 1992. Saudi Arabia was among the first countries that recognized the independence of Azerbaijan on December 30, 1991. Azerbaijan has its embassy in Riyadh (opened in April 1994) and the Saudi Arabian Embassy has operated in Baku since June 1999.

Azerbaijan President Heydar Aliyev’s visit to Saudi Arabia in 1994 was considered a milestone that enabled further relationships between the two countries.

== Cultural connections ==
The common Islamic heritage facilitates and strengthens the existing ties between Saudi Arabia and Azerbaijan. As an indicator, every year the Azerbaijani religious people visit holy places of Islam which are located in Saudi Arabia (attending a ceremony of pilgrimage – Hajj).To develop cultural bonds further, Azerbaijani Culture Days held on 10–17 November 2007 in Riyadh, as well as in the cities of Jeddah and Dammam. Also, the Days of Culture of Saudi Arabia took place on 17–21 June 2008 in Baku.

== Humanitarian cooperation ==
Saudi Arabia provided humanitarian assistance to Azerbaijan between 1994 and 1999 to overcome the huge refugee crisis as a result of the NK conflict. The program was led by King Fahd, aimed to help refugees and IDPs and by providing them with daily necessities such as food, medicine and so on. As a part of the program, even some disabled people of the NK conflict were treated in Saudi Arabia in 1999.

In 2002, the "Saudi Fund for Development" (SFD) provided a loan worth of 35.7 million riyals to the Government of Azerbaijan for construction of secondary schools in Baku city. Furthermore, in 2005, the Saudi government donated approximately 50,000 dollars to the Azerbaijani side for demining and restoration of the liberated parts of the country.

== Economic relations ==
Recently, there are around four companies of Saudi Arabia operating in various fields in Azerbaijan. In 2015, according to a joint agreement "Memorandum of understanding", it was aimed to carry out a long-term project in the Kingdom energy field between the State Oil Company of the Azerbaijan Republic and the Saudi company “Soroof International”. The regularly held business forms between these countries help them to analyze the economic capabilities of each other and to build their economic activities on that basis. The 2nd Azerbaijan-Saudi Arabian Business Forum (was held at the Heydar Aliyev Center on May 15, with the support of the Ministry of Economy and Industry and the Azerbaijan Export and Investment Promotion Foundation (AZPROMO)) is exactly one those forms that brought together more than 300 businessmen from both countries that investigated their relative capabilities in agriculture, industry, construction, finance, ICT, logistics, tourism, consulting, petrochemicals and healthcare. Furthermore, in accordance with Article VII of the "General Agreement on Cooperation in the Field of Economic, Trade, Investment, Technical, Cultural, Sports and Youth between the Government of the Republic of Azerbaijan and the Government of the Kingdom of Saudi Arabia" signed on July 10, 1994, in Jeddah, there have been held several meetings of Azerbaijan-Saudi Arabia Joint Commission on Cooperation (for instance, in Riyadh on February 14–15, 2004 (2nd meeting) and in Baku on March 3, 2019 (5th meeting).

In general, there are 14 agreements between Azerbaijan and Saudi Arabia for developing the existing economic relations further. It is estimated that there will be additional 8 new agreements in the fields of political, economic and cultural.

Saudi Arabian companies have US$370 million investment in Azerbaijan and currently, there are about 26 Saudi Arabia companies for carrying out transactions between the two nations. Also, the Saudi Development Fund actively participated in the construction of local infrastructure including channel and road, schools, construction water supply, and sewerage systems, etc.

At the beginning of 2019, Agency for the Development of Small and Medium-Sized Enterprises (SMEs) under the Ministry of Economy of Azerbaijan and Saudi Arabian General Investment Authority (SAGIA) signed an agreement that aimed to find further opportunities for investment. According to the statistics of the State Customs Committee of Azerbaijan (2018), the total transactions between the mentioned nations was worth to 30.9 million AZN. Azerbaijani side in these transactions mostly had a current account deficit as approximately 24.3 million out of total trade turnover was made due to the imports of Azerbaijan. Moreover, investing in the energy sector of Azerbaijan together with agriculture, tourism, transport is a priority for Saudi Arabia.

== Alliance against Iran ==
Due to Azerbaijan and Saudi Arabia share a similar hostile relationship with Iran, the two countries have managed to increase their cooperation in attempts to contain Iranian influence. Azerbaijan the only majority-dominated Shi'a ally of Saudi Arabia and have supported Saudi Arabia's plan to contain Iran in the region. However, Azerbaijan has sought to refrain from participating a direct anti-Iranian alliance.

== Deterioration of relations in 2020 ==
Relations between Azerbaijan and Saudi Arabia suffered a huge blow during the 2020 Nagorno-Karabakh conflict, when Saudi Arabia, which traditionally backs Azerbaijan over territorial integrity, has no longer provided a similar supportive tone, instead only urged Azerbaijan to find a solution with Armenia. However, after Turkish President Recep Tayyip Erdoğan blamed Arab countries, in particular Saudi Arabia and the United Arab Emirates, for destabilising the Middle East and the Caucasus, Al Arabiya responded by broadcasting Armenian President Armen Sargsyan's speech, which the Armenian President condemning Turkey and Azerbaijan for inflaming the war, while Saudi Arabia's Chamber of Commerce Head, Ajlan Al-Ajlan, called for anti-Turkish boycott. Turkey is Azerbaijan's major political, economic and cultural ally in the region. Azerbaijan relations with Saudi Arabia deteriorated but Azerbaijan relations with Turkey remain close.

== Resident diplomatic missions ==
- Azerbaijan has an embassy in Riyadh.
- Saudi Arabia has an embassy in Baku.

== See also ==
- Foreign relations of Azerbaijan
- Foreign relations of Saudi Arabia
- Armenia–Saudi Arabia relations
- Saudi Arabia–Turkey relations
