= Protocol Agreement-2026 (Pakistan–Kuwait) =

2026 Pakistan–Kuwait defence agreement

- Pakistan and Kuwait
- Type: Defence co-operation agreement
- Signed: 27 August 2026
- Location: Rawalpindi, Pakistan
- Signatories: Khawaja Muhammad Asif (Defence Minister of Pakistan); Sheikh Abdullah Ali Abdullah Al-Saleem Al-Sabah (Defence Minister of Kuwait)
- Parties: Pakistan; Kuwait
- Language: English

The Protocol Agreement-2026 is a defence co-operation agreement between Pakistan and Kuwait, signed on 27 August 2026, that expands a military co-operation framework the two countries established under a 2023 defence agreement. Under the protocol, Pakistan's armed forces will assist Kuwait's armed forces with training, capacity building, border management and other mutually agreed areas of defence collaboration.

The pact was signed in Rawalpindi by Kuwait's Defence Minister, Sheikh Abdullah Ali Abdullah Al-Saleem Al-Sabah, and Pakistan's Defence Minister, Khawaja Muhammad Asif, during an official visit of a Kuwaiti delegation to Pakistan.

== Background ==
Analysts said Gulf countries were likely to accelerate efforts to diversify their security partnerships following the United States–Israel war on Iran, as the region absorbed the lasting impact of the conflict. The war led some regional capitals to question the reliability of the United States as a security guarantor, prompting a push to move away from a US-centric security architecture.

In June 2023, Pakistan and Kuwait signed a limited Defence Co-operation Agreement covering training and joint exercises. By mid-2026, Kuwait was reportedly seeking an expanded pact that would include thousands of Pakistani troops, fighter jets, drones and air defence systems, similar to Pakistan's agreement with Saudi Arabia. Pakistani officials indicated that combat troop deployments were not under consideration at that stage, with one security official stating, "We are not and we cannot consider a deployment of combat troops at this stage." The talks were described as being at an early stage, with Pakistan reportedly seeking energy co-operation and investment in return for any expanded defence commitments. In July 2026, Pakistan welcomed Kuwait's ratification of the 2023 agreement, describing it as a major advancement in the two countries' defence relationship.

== Agreement ==
The protocol was signed on 27 August 2026 in Rawalpindi, expanding the military co-operation framework established under the 2023 agreement.

The Kuwaiti delegation also met Chief of Army Staff and Chief of Defence Forces Field Marshal Asim Munir at General Headquarters in Rawalpindi, with both sides reaffirming their commitment to institutional ties and defence collaboration.

The agreement provides a framework for enhancing operational coordination, exchanging expertise, and improving co-operation between the two countries' armed forces.

== Reactions ==
=== Domestic ===
Pakistan: Pakistan welcomed Kuwait's ratification of the 2023 agreement, with a Foreign Ministry spokesperson describing it as an "important milestone" in the two countries' defence partnership.

Kuwait: Kuwait's Defence Ministry described the deal as an "important milestone" that would serve shared interests and contribute to regional security.

=== Regional ===
The agreement came amid heightened regional security concerns in the Gulf, following Iranian missile and drone attacks on several Gulf countries during the recent escalation. The conflict led some Gulf states to question the reliability of the United States as a security guarantor and accelerate efforts to diversify their defence partnerships.

The agreement with Kuwait followed Pakistan's participation in the Mecca Defence Alliance with Saudi Arabia and Turkey in August 2026.

== See also ==
- Kuwait–Pakistan relations
- Badr Memorandum of Understanding
- Mecca Defence Alliance
- Strategic Mutual Defence Agreement
- Pakistan and weapons of mass destruction
- Pakistan Armed Forces
