= Kuwait–Pakistan relations =

Bilateral relations

- Pakistan: Kuwait

Kuwait–Pakistan relations refer to bilateral relations between Kuwait and Pakistan. Pakistan has an embassy in Kuwait City and Kuwait has an embassy in Islamabad and a consulate in Karachi. Kuwait and Pakistan are members of OIC.

== Commercial, economic and cultural ties ==
Pakistani forces took an active part in the liberation of Kuwait along with coalition forces in 1991, following the after the Iraqi invasion of Kuwait in August 1990. After the end of the first Gulf War in 1991 Pakistani army engineers were involved in mine-clearance operations in the country. The present level of Kuwaiti exports to Pakistan is $750 million to $1.0 billion. Pakistani exports to Kuwait are $50 million. During the COVID-19 pandemic, Pakistan sent hundreds of doctors, nurses and technicians to Kuwait.

== Expatriate communities ==
The number of Pakistanis living in Kuwait is estimated to be around 107,084 .

== Aid to Pakistan ==
Kuwait was also the first country to send aid to isolated mountain villages in Kashmir after the quake of 2005, also offering the largest amount of aid in the aftermath of the quake ($100m).

In response to the 2005 Kashmir earthquake, the Kuwaiti government pledged Pakistan US$100 million. Moreover, in the aftermath of the 2010 Pakistan floods, the Kuwaiti government lifted a long-standing ban on collecting donations in public.

== Defence cooperation ==
Kuwait and Pakistan have maintained defence cooperation as part of their broader bilateral relationship. The two countries have engaged in military training, professional exchanges and cooperation between their armed forces over several decades.

On 11 June 2023, Kuwait and Pakistan signed a Defence Cooperation Agreement in Kuwait City to provide a framework for cooperation between their defence establishments. The agreement covers areas including military training and education, exchange of expertise, intelligence cooperation, logistics, defence technology, scientific research and institutional collaboration between the Kuwait Armed Forces and the Pakistan Armed Forces. The agreement also provides for cooperation in fields including defence manufacturing, electronic communication systems, military research, cultural activities and exchanges related to military affairs. A joint military committee was established to oversee implementation, coordinate activities, and facilitate military exercises, official visits and other programmes between the two sides.

In July 2026, Kuwait formally approved the agreement through a decree-law published in the official gazette Kuwait Al-Youm, three years after its signing. The agreement was approved for an initial period of five years and established a framework for institutional defence cooperation rather than a mutual defence commitment requiring automatic military deployment. The agreement strengthened existing defence ties between Kuwait and Pakistan by creating formal mechanisms for cooperation in training, military coordination, and exchange of knowledge between the two countries' armed forces.

The next month, Kuwaiti defence minister Sheikh Abdullah Ali Abdullah Al-Saleem Al-Sabah visited Pakistan's defence ministry in Rawalpindi to meet his Pakistani counterpart Khawaja Asif and expand the existing defence cooperation agreement. Protocol Agreement-2026 was signed on the occasion, which expanded the defence ties between the two countries and required Pakistan to provide training, capacity building, and border-management assistance to Kuwait. It also covered operational coordination, expertise sharing, and military readiness. The protocol was signed in the backdrop of the Mecca Defence Alliance signed by Pakistan, Turkey, and Saudi Arabia, which had been signed only a few weeks prior.

== See also ==
- Foreign relations of Kuwait
- Foreign relations of Pakistan
- Protocol Agreement-2026 (Pakistan–Kuwait)
