= Strategic Mutual Defence Agreement =

2025 Pakistan–Saudi Arabia treaty

Strategic Mutual Defense Agreement between the Kingdom of Saudi Arabia and the Islamic Republic of Pakistan
- Pakistan and Saudi Arabia, parties to the Agreement
- Type: Defence pact
- Signed: 17 September 2025
- Location: Al-Yamamah Palace, Riyadh, Saudi Arabia
- Replaced by: Mecca Defence Alliance
- Signatories: Shehbaz Sharif (Prime Minister of Pakistan); Mohammed bin Salman (Prime Minister of Saudi Arabia)
- Parties: Pakistan; Saudi Arabia
- Language: English

The Strategic Mutual Defence Agreement (SMDA) (Note: Urdu: تزویراتی باہمی دفاعی معاہدہ, romanised: tazvīrātī bāhmī difā'ī mu'āhidā Arabic: اتفاقية الدفاع الإستراتيجي المشترك, romanised: aitifāqiat aldifae al'īstratijī almushtarak) is a security and defence pact between the countries of Pakistan and Saudi Arabia. Under this agreement both countries have committed to treating any act of aggression against one as an act against both known as collective security.

The pact was signed on 17 September 2025 at Al-Yamamah Palace in Riyadh, by Saudi crown prince and Prime Minister, Mohammed bin Salman and Pakistani prime minister Shehbaz Sharif, during a state visit of the latter to Saudi Arabia.

== Background ==
Saudi Arabia and Pakistan share a long-standing relationship that encompasses military and economic cooperation, as well as cultural and religious ties.

In recent years, shifts in Middle Eastern geopolitics—including concerns about external threats, responses to Israeli military actions, and doubts regarding American reliability as a security guarantor—have intensified regional security concerns. Many analysts view the agreement, at least in part, as a response to these dynamics.

=== Israeli airstrikes on Qatar ===
The Financial Times reported that the 9 September 2025 Israeli airstrikes in Doha, Qatar deeply unsettled Gulf states' sense of security, exacerbating long-standing concerns about United States unpredictability and commitment to their defence.

The Israeli unilateral attacks particularly challenged United States obligations under the Gulf Cooperation Council (GCC). A senior Saudi security official stated, "We hope [the agreement] will reinforce our deterrence—aggression against one is aggression against the other". The spillover of the Israel's war in Gaza in wider Middle East is widely seen as defining factor in Saudi Arabia's signing of a security pact with Pakistan.

== Agreement ==
The treaty was signed on 17 September 2025 in Riyadh by the Saudi Crown Prince and Prime Minister, Mohammed bin Salman, and the Pakistani Prime Minister, Shehbaz Sharif. It came against the backdrop of the Israeli strikes on Qatar and followed the Arab–Islamic extraordinary summit in Doha. Both countries have had close economic, religious, and security ties since the 1960s, when Pakistani troops were first deployed on Saudi frontiers over fears of Egypt's participation in the North Yemen civil war. Since then, Pakistan has trained between 8,000 and 10,000 Saudi military personnel.

According to a statement by the Saudi Arabia Press Department, "The agreement states that any aggression against either country shall be considered an aggression against both." The agreement's text was not officially published.

In an analysis published by the Belfer Center for Science and International Affairs, the agreement is "primarily a political signal of solidarity and strategic cooperation, rather than an unconditional war guarantee."

According to Reuters, anonymous Pakistani government sources, including individuals privy to the text of the confidential pact, have revealed that it provides for the possibility of up to 80,000 Pakistani troops being deployed to Saudi Arabia, to help secure the kingdom's borders alongside Saudi forces.

=== Prospective nuclear weapons deployment ===
The news of SMDA quickly attracted the Western news media of speculating Pakistan's nuclear weapons being deployed in the Kingdom. Since 2010s, Saudi Arabia has been keenly interested in nuclear weapons to counter Iranian regional ambitions, and has fostered ties with Pakistan, which has painstakingly and covertly developed its nuclear weapons program started in 1972 and proved its operational capabilities in 1998.

Over the question of the nuclear umbrella, a senior Saudi official told Reuters that "This is a comprehensive defensive agreement that encompasses all military means" but did not explicitly mention Pakistan's nuclear sharing with Saudi Arabia. It is the first military pact between an Arab Gulf state and a nuclear power. Pakistani Defence Minister Khawaja Asif initially hinted at the nuclear sharing aspect to the strategic agreement but later backtracked, denying such a scope. This lack of clarity led to speculation, leaving the exact terms of the pact uncertain.

The independent assessment by the Belfer Center for Science and International Affairs is of the view that nuclear umbrella remains ideally speculative at its best and that Islamabad's foreign and war strategists would be "extremely wary of any commitment that dilutes its control over its nuclear codes or entangles it in conflicts beyond its primary focus."

== Reactions ==
Geopolitical analyst Ian Bremmer suggested that the pact could alter India's security calculus, particularly if Saudi Arabia is committed to coming to Pakistan's defence in the event of a conflict.

=== Domestic ===
Pakistan: An editorial in the Pakistani newspaper Dawn called it "the most significant upgrade to Pakistan–Saudi defence relations in decades". Former Pakistani diplomat Hussein Haqqani noted that the treaty likely covers missile defence.

Saudi Arabia: Saudi officials portrayed the pact as a formalisation of a long-standing military partnership, while also using it to send a message of strategic diversification amid regional turmoil.

=== Regional ===
Some neighbouring states and regional powers have expressed concern about the impact on the regional security balance. India, in particular, has reacted with statements that it is carefully monitoring the development. Analysts speaking to The Hindu said the timing of the pact appeared to be a warning after Israel's expanding military offensive across the Middle East.

The Institute for the Study of War was of the view that the pact would likely concern Iran, which it supported its reasoning with Iranian hostile actions in both Pakistan and Saudi Arabia in past years. However, the Iranian President Masoud Pezeshkian, speaking on the United Nations General Assembly session, welcomed the pact between Pakistan and Saudi Arabia as the beginning of a "comprehensive regional security system" in opposing Israeli military strikes expansion in the Middle East.

== Usage ==
In 2026, during the Iran War, Saudi Arabia reportedly invoked the SMDA. Pakistan initially deployed at least 8,000 troops, along with 16 aircraft (including mostly JF-17s), two squadrons of drones, and an HQ-9 air defence battery to Saudi Arabia.

== Possible expansion ==
In January 2026 emerged rumours of Turkey considering joining the SMDA. Later, It was confirmed that Turkey will not be joining the SMDA, and the SMDA will remain a bilateral alliance between the Kingdom of Saudi Arabia and the Islamic Republic of Pakistan.

Turkey later joined Saudi Arabia and Pakistan in a trilateral defence agreement under the Mecca Defence Alliance in August 2026.

== See also ==
- 2026 Saudi Arabia–United States nuclear deal
- Mecca Defence Alliance
- Badr Memorandum of Understanding
- Protocol Agreement-2026 (Pakistan–Kuwait)
- Nuclear program of Saudi Arabia
- Pakistan and weapons of mass destruction
- Saudi Arabia and weapons of mass destruction
