= List of ambassadors of Turkey to Azerbaijan =

The list of ambassadors of Turkey to Azerbaijan provides a chronological record of individuals who have served as the diplomatic representatives of the Republic of Turkey to the Republic of Azerbaijan.

== List of ambassadors ==
Ambassador	Term start	Term end	Ref.
İlhami Altan Karamanoğlu	14 January 1992	24 April 1995	
Ömür Orhun	2 May 1995	16 September 1996	
Osman Faruk Loğoğlu	30 September 1996	5 February 1998	
Kadri Ecvet Tezcan	6 February 1998	1 November 2001	
Ahmet Ünal Çeviköz	12 November 2001	31 October 2004	
Turan Moralı	19 November 2004	4 January 2007	
Hüseyin Avni Karslıoğlu	16 January 2007	20 February 2008	
Hulusi Kılıç	1 March 2008	15 September 2012	
Alper Coşkun	16 September 2012	7 October 2016	
Erkan Özoral	11 October 2016	15 April 2021	
Cahit Bağcı	19 April 2021	Present	

== See also ==
- Azerbaijan–Turkey relations
- Embassy of Turkey in Baku
- Embassy of Azerbaijan in Ankara
