= Secretary General of Mecca Defence Alliance =

Head of Mecca Defence Alliance

- Incumbent; Nauman Mahmood since 5 October 2026
- Status: Active
- Seat: Riyadh, Saudi Arabia
- Appointer: Strategic Political and Defence Committee

The Secretary General of the Mecca Defence Alliance is the chief executive officer and principal administrative head of the Mecca Defence Alliance (MDA) an intergovernmental military alliance in muslim world. The Secretary General oversees the day-to-day operations of the Permanent General Secretariat based in Riyadh, Saudi Arabia, and co-ordinates defence, security, and strategic initiatives among member states primarily Saudi Arabia, Turkey, and Pakistan.

The position was formally created following the establishment of the trilateral alliance under the Mecca Joint Defence Agreement signed on 7 August 2026.

== History ==
Following the signing of the Mecca Joint Defence Agreement on 7 August 2026, amidst escalating regional tensions in the Middle East, the signatory nations agreed to establish a permanent secretariat in Riyadh. On 23 September 2026, the Ministry of Foreign Affairs of Pakistan officially announced the appointment of retired Lieutenant General Nauman Mahmood as the inaugural Secretary General of the alliance. Mahmood officially assumed his duties on 5 October 2026, during an emergency meeting of the Strategic Political and Defence Committee in Riyadh.

== List of secretary generals ==
The member states of Mecca Defence Alliance selected the first secretary general on 5 October 2026.

No.	Portrait	Secretary General	Took office	Left office	Time in office	Previous office	Member State
1	Nauman Mahmood	Lieutenant General; Nauman Mahmood (born c. 1969)	5 October 2026	Incumbent	23 days	35th President of the Pakistan National Defence University	Pakistan
