= Nauman Mahmood =

Pakistan Army officer (born c. 1969)

Lieutenant General Nauman Mahmood HI(M)
- نعمان محمود

Secretary General of Mecca Defence Alliance
- Incumbent
- Assumed office 5 October 2026
- Preceded by: Position established

35th President of the National Defence University
- In office 23 November 2021 – 24 April 2023
- Preceded by: Lt. Gen. Muhammad Saeed

Personal details
- Born: c. 1969 Rawalpindi, West Pakistan
- Education: National Defence University
- Awards: Hilal-i-Imtiaz

Military service
- Allegiance: Pakistan
- Branch/service: Pakistan Army
- Years of service: 1987–2023
- Rank: Lieutenant general
- Unit: Baloch Regiment
- Commands: National Defence University; XI Corps; Inter-Services Public Relations; Communication & Information Technology Branch, GHQ
- Battles/wars: Operation Zarb-e-Azb

Nauman Mahmood HI(M) is a retired lieutenant general of the Pakistan Army. He is the current secretary general of the Mecca Defence Alliance. He previously served as the 35th president of National Defence University from November 2021 to April 2023.

Born in Rawalpindi in Punjab, Pakistan, Mahmood was previously assigned as commanding officer (CO) of an Infantry Regiment and Chief of Staff (COS) of a Corps. He also served as general officer commanding (GOC) of an Infantry Division in North Waziristan District and finally director general Inter-Services Intelligence (DG-ISI (A) Analysis) as a two star before getting promoted to a lieutenant general. He was appointed to the General Headquarters as inspector general for Communication & Information Technology Branch at Rawalpindi.

== Early life and education ==
Nauman Mahmood was born in c. 1969 in Rawalpindi, West Pakistan, into a Punjabi family belonging to the Rajput clan. His father, Lieutenant Colonel Raja Sultan Mahmood, was the commander of 32 Baloch who was killed during the 1971 war against India. He lived in Shaheed Army Officers Colony in the Sabzazar neighbourhood of Rawalpindi.

He was trained at St. Mary's Academy Lalazar. Mahmood was commissioned in the Pakistan Army on 11 September 1987. He graduated from the Pakistan Command and Staff College, Command and Staff College, Egypt and the National Defence University, Islamabad, where he earned a master’s degree in war studies.

== Military career ==
=== Command and staff appointments ===
As an instructor, he was appointed as chief instructor, senior instructor and instructor class A at Command and Staff College. He has also commanded 2Ak Brigade situated at Rawalakot, Azad Kashmir.

His military career included commanding an infantry division in North Waziristan during Pakistan's operations against militant groups in the Afghan border region. He later transitioned to intelligence, serving as the director general of the Analysis Directorate within the Inter-Services Intelligence (ISI), where his duties involved strategic assessment and foreign intelligence liaison.

Belonging to the Baloch Regiment, he was promoted to the rank of lieutenant general in April 2019. He was subsequently appointed as commander of the XI Corps in December 2019 until he was preceded by Lieutenant General Faiz Hameed on 23 November 2021. He retired in April 2023.

=== Mecca Defence Alliance ===
In September 2026, he was named to lead the tripartite Mecca Defence Alliance's secretariat in Riyadh as the first secretary general for a three-year term.
