= Badr Memorandum of Understanding =

Defence cooperation agreement

- Flags of the member countries (from left to right): Pakistan, Indonesia, Turkey and Qatar
- Type: Defence-industrial cooperation agreement
- Signed: 21 October 2026
- Location: Doha, Qatar
- Parties: Pakistan; Qatar; Turkey; Indonesia

The Badr Memorandum of Understanding, also known as Project Badr, is a multilateral defence-industrial cooperation agreement between Pakistan, Qatar, Turkey and Indonesia. It was signed in Doha on 21 October 2026 and establishes a framework for cooperation in defence manufacturing, joint production, research and development, technology transfer and technical training.

The agreement was signed amid regional security concerns following the 2026 Iran war. It followed several defence arrangements involving Pakistan, including the Strategic Mutual Defence Agreement with Saudi Arabia in September 2025 and the Mecca Joint Defence Agreement with Saudi Arabia and Turkey in August 2026. Unlike those agreements, the Badr memorandum focuses on defence-industrial cooperation and does not establish a collective-defence commitment.

The name "Badr" means "full moon" in Arabic. According to the Qatar News Agency, it was chosen to reflect the strengths of the four participating countries and the economic and defence aspects of their cooperation.

== Background ==
The four participating countries had established defence and industrial partnerships before the memorandum was signed. Pakistan and Turkey had cooperated in naval shipbuilding through the MILGEM-class corvette programme, while Turkey and Indonesia had worked together on the development of the Harimau tank. Qatar had also expanded its defence procurement and industrial cooperation with Türkiye. The Badr initiative brought these existing areas of cooperation into a wider framework involving all four countries.

The agreement was signed during the 2026 Iran war, which increased regional security concerns and led several Middle Eastern countries to review their defence arrangements. Al Jazeera reported that the conflict had encouraged countries to diversify their security partnerships and strengthen domestic defence production. The Badr initiative was part of this wider effort to develop cooperation in military production and technology rather than relying only on foreign purchases.

Pakistan had also signed several separate defence agreements in the years before the Badr memorandum. On 17 September 2025, Pakistan and Saudi Arabia signed the Strategic Mutual Defence Agreement, which provides that aggression against either country would be considered aggression against both.

On 7 August 2026, Pakistan, Saudi Arabia and Turkey signed the Mecca Joint Defence Agreement in Saudi Arabia. The agreement provides that an armed attack against any one of the three countries would be regarded as an attack against all three. It also provides for closer defence cooperation and collective deterrence.

On 27 August 2026, Pakistan and Kuwait signed Protocol Agreement, expanding their existing defence cooperation framework. The agreement provides for Pakistani assistance to Kuwait in military training, capacity building and border management. Unlike the Mecca Agreement and the Strategic Mutual Defence Agreement, it does not contain a collective-defence commitment.

== Signing ==
The memorandum was signed in Doha, Qatar on 21 October 2026 by representatives of the defence ministries of Pakistan, Qatar, Turkey and Indonesia. The signing also involved Pakistan's Defence Industrial Production Organization and Türkiye's Presidency of Defence Industries.

The ceremony was attended by Pakistan's Defence Minister Khawaja Muhammad Asif, Qatar's Deputy Prime Minister and Minister of State for Defence Affairs Saoud bin Abdulrahman Al Thani, Turkey's Defence Minister Yaşar Güler and Indonesia's Deputy Defence Minister Yusuf Jauhari. Haluk Görgün, head of Turkey's defence industry agency, also attended the ceremony.

== Provisions ==
The memorandum provides a framework for cooperation in defence manufacturing, joint production, research and development, technology sharing and technical training. It aims to combine the industrial capabilities of the participating countries and strengthen their domestic defence industries. The agreement also provides opportunities for joint industrial projects and the development of technical expertise. The participating countries intend to use their respective industrial capabilities to support defence production and meet the requirements of allied and friendly countries. The four signatories also agreed that other countries may join the framework under criteria established by the original participants.

== Analysis ==
The Badr memorandum has been viewed as part of wider efforts to develop regional defence capabilities following the 2026 Iran war. In its coverage of the agreement, Al Jazeera reported that the participating countries could combine Turkey's defence technology, Pakistan's and Indonesia's manufacturing capabilities, and Qatar's investment potential. Analysts cited by the publication said that this cooperation could support joint production and the development of defence supply chains. The memorandum is different from the Mecca Defence Alliance and the Strategic Mutual Defence Agreement. Those agreements include collective-defence provisions, whereas Badr focuses on defence manufacturing and technical cooperation. It also differs from Protocol Agreement between Pakistan and Kuwait, which concerns military training and capacity building.

== See also ==
- Mecca Agreement
- Strategic Mutual Defence Agreement
- Protocol Agreement-2026 (Pakistan–Kuwait)
