= Agreement on Strategic Partnership and Mutual Support =

2010 treaty between Azerbaijan and Turkey

Agreement on Strategic Partnership and Mutual Support Stratejik İşbirliği Anlaşması
- Signed: 16 August 2010
- Location: Baku, Azerbaijan
- Condition: Ratification of both parties
- Expiration: 16 August 2030 (Automatically extended every ten years, unless parties notify their withdrawal)
- Signatories: Azerbaijan; Turkey
- Parties: Azerbaijan; Turkey
- Ratifiers: National Assembly of Azerbaijan; Grand National Assembly of Turkey
- Languages: Azerbaijani, Turkish

The Agreement on Strategic Partnership and Mutual Support (Turkish: Stratejik Ortaklık ve Karşılıklı Yardım Anlaşması; Azerbaijani: Türkiyə-Azərbaycan Strateji Əməkdaşlıq Sazişi) between Azerbaijan and Turkey for strategic partnership and security co-operation was signed at Baku by Presidents Ilham Aliyev and Abdullah Gül.

Under the terms of the treaty, both Turkey and Azerbaijan will support each other "using all possibilities" in the case of a military attack or aggression against either of the countries.

== Overview ==
The Agreement consists of 23 articles and five chapters: "Military-political and security issues", "Military and military-technical cooperation", "Humanitarian issues", "Economic cooperation", and "Common and final provisions".

== History ==
=== Ratification process ===
==== Azerbaijan ====
The agreement was ratified by National Assembly of Azerbaijan on 21 December 2010.

==== Turkey ====
Following ratification by the Azerbaijani Assembly, Grand National Assembly of Turkey ratified on 2 February 2011.

== See also ==
- Azerbaijan–Turkey relations
