= Sina Toossi =

Iranian-American writer, editor and researcher

Sina Toossi is an Iranian-American writer, editor and researcher who is a senior non-resident fellow at the American Center for International Policy.

Toossi holds a bachelor degree in economics and political science from the University of Illinois Urbana-Champaign and a master's degree in international affairs from American University. He interned at the National Iranian American Council, then worked on the JCPOA (Iran nuclear deal) and, from 2016 to 2018, for the Program on Science and Global Security at Princeton University.

Toossi is a senior non-resident fellow at the Center for International Policy, where his work focuses on US-Iran relations, US policy toward the Middle East and nuclear issues, and has been a policy and editorial advisor at Miaan Group, a U.S.-based human rights organization focused on Iran and the Middle East. He produces research and analysis on U.S.-Iran relations, human rights issues, and nuclear policy issues. His work has been published in Foreign Affairs, Foreign Policy, USA Today and The Guardian. He has also appeared on BBC World News and BBC Persian. He received an Under 40 Award from the Middle East Policy Council in 2024.
