= Azerbaijan–Turkey relations =

Bilateral relations between Turkey and Azerbaijan

- Turkey: Azerbaijan

Diplomatic mission
- Embassy of Turkey, Baku: Embassy of Azerbaijan, Ankara

Azerbaijan–Turkey relations have been strong between the only two predominantly Turkic countries located west of the Caspian Sea and east of the Mediterranean Sea. Former Azerbaijani president Heydar Aliyev often described the two as being "one nation, two states." (Note: Azerbaijani: Bir millət, iki dövlət, Turkish: Bir millet, iki devlet)

Turkey was one of the first countries to recognize Azerbaijan's independence on 4 June 1918 (Treaty of Batum) and the first to recognize Azerbaijan's restoration of independence from the Soviet Union in 1991. Since then, Turkey has been a staunch supporter of Azerbaijan in its efforts to consolidate its independence, preserve its territorial integrity over the Nagorno-Karabakh region, and realize its economic potential arising from the rich natural resources of the Caspian Sea. The two countries share a 17 kilometres (11 mi) long international borderline, with the Aras River separating Turkey from the Nakhchivan exclave of Azerbaijan.

== History ==
=== Azerbaijan Soviet Socialist Republic period ===
After the signing of the Treaty of Kars, a diplomatic mission of the Azerbaijan Soviet Socialist Republic was sent to Turkey. From 1921 to 1922, the diplomatic representative of the Azerbaijan Soviet Socialist Republic and the Transcaucasian Socialist Federative Soviet Republic to Turkey was Ibrahim Abilov.

=== Since 1991 ===
==== First Nagorno-Karabakh War ====
When the First Nagorno-Karabakh War began, Turkey fully supported Azerbaijan, particularly during the presidency of Azerbaijani President Abulfaz Elchibey. After the Kalbajar District came under the control of the Armenian Armed Forces, Turkey expressed its support for Azerbaijan at an emergency meeting of the United Nations Security Council held on April 6, 1993. However, the Security Council did not accept Turkey’s proposed wording describing the situation as “Armenian aggression against the sovereign Republic of Azerbaijan.” Instead, the adopted resolution merely expressed serious concern over the escalation of hostilities in the Nagorno-Karabakh conflict and did not mention Armenian aggression.

In May 1992, Armenian armed forces attacked the Nakhchivan Autonomous Republic, raising the possibility of Turkish intervention in the war. In 1993, Turkey unilaterally closed the Armenia–Turkey border in response to the occupation of Azerbaijani territories by Armenian forces. The Turkish government stated that the border could be reopened if Armenia ceased pursuing international recognition of the Armenian genocide and withdrew from the Nagorno-Karabakh conflict zone.

However, Turkey’s support largely remained at the diplomatic level. According to researcher Svante Cornell, this was because Turkey feared worsening relations with Russia, another influential actor in the Caucasus region. In April 1993, after Armenian forces captured Kalbajar District, Turkish President Turgut Özal accused Russia of supporting Armenia. He also announced that Turkey would expand military cooperation with Azerbaijan and begin supplying weapons. In response, Russian Defense Minister Pavel Grachev, during a visit to Ankara, reportedly warned Turkey to “keep its hands off the Azerbaijani issue.”

==== Second Nagorno-Karabakh War ====
Turkey also supported Azerbaijan during the 2020 Second Nagorno-Karabakh War. Following the ceasefire declaration, Turkey continued providing assistance to Azerbaijan in clearing mines and improvised explosive devices left behind by Armenian forces in the recovered territories.

On November 11, 2020, Russian Defense Minister Sergey Shoigu and Turkish Defense Minister Hulusi Akar signed a memorandum of understanding on the establishment of a joint center to monitor the ceasefire in Nagorno-Karabakh.

== Political relations ==
=== State visits ===
İlham Aliyev visited Turkey in 2003 shortly after first entering the Azerbaijani political scene at the behest of his ailing father Heydar Aliyev in a move that was interpreted at the time as an indication of political support from Turkish Prime Minister Recep Tayyip Erdoğan.

On 13 May 2009, Turkish Prime Minister Erdoğan visited Baku with a delegation to strengthen ties between Turkey and Azerbaijan. In a joint press conference with President Aliyev, Erdoğan emphasized that the Nagorno-Karabakh conflict was the cause of the closed border and that Turkey would not normalize relations with Armenia until the occupation ended. He also reaffirmed Turkey's support for Azerbaijan's territorial integrity. The visit was positively received by Turkish opposition parties, and Erdoğan later met with Russian Prime Minister Vladimir Putin to discuss regional issues, including Nagorno-Karabakh.

=== OSCE Minsk Group ===
Turkey supports the OSCE Minsk Group, as a mechanism for resolving the territorial dispute and views it from the principle of Azerbaijani integrity. Turkey did not recognize the previously de facto independent republic of Nagorno-Karabakh that emerged, otherwise known as Artsakh. Turkey has supported various indirect bilateral talks between Azerbaijan and Armenia and initiated trilateral dialogue in Reykjavík in 2002 and the Istanbul Summit, 2004 among the Ministers of Foreign Affairs of Turkey, Azerbaijan, and Armenia in an attempt to resolve the ongoing conflict, but its diplomatic efforts are hampered by its own tensions with Armenia over the claim of Armenian genocide and its ongoing border blockade against Armenia, which has resulted in subsequent infrastructure projects bypassing Armenian territory.

=== Shusha Declaration ===
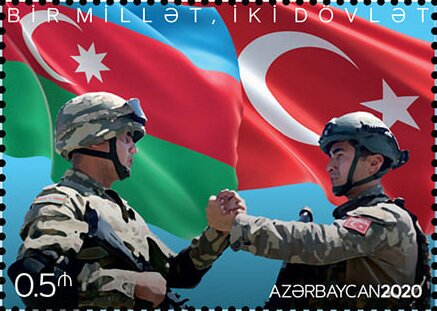
Commemorative stamp issued by Azerbaijan Postal Service in memory of the victory in the Second Nagorno-Karabakh War. The stamp bears the slogan Bir Millet, İki Devlet (One Nation, Two States)

After Azerbaijan won the Second Karabakh War, The Victory Parade was held in Baku with the participation of Turkey and Turkish President Erdoğan. During this parade, President Erdoğan read the lyrics of a famous anonymous folk song Aras Türküsü also known as Ay Laçin (wrongly attributed to Bakhtiyar Vahabzadeh), which led to a controversy between Turkey and Iran regarding Iranian Azerbaijan since Iran has a very large Turk and Azerbaijani population. Months after this ceremony, the Shusha Declaration was signed in Shusha, Karabakh, between Turkish President Erdoğan and Azerbaijani President Aliyev, which deepened the relations between the two countries. After this declaration, political, economic and military cooperation between Azerbaijan and Turkey reached a higher level. The Azerbaijani Armed Forces abandoned the Soviet model by taking the Turkish military as an example. The Azerbaijani defense industry decided to cooperate with Turkish defense companies. Turkey stated that it would support Azerbaijan's Zangezur corridor project. The two countries also formed a defense pact.

=== Armenian–Turkish diplomatic progress in the 2000s ===
On the eve of the April 2009 official visit to Turkey by US President Barack Obama, sources in Ankara and Yerevan announced that a deal may soon be struck to reopen the border between the two states and exchange diplomatic personnel. That prompted concerns from both Baku and Turkish nationalists that the ongoing negotiations over the Nagorno-Karabakh dispute would be adversely affected by the lifting of the longstanding blockade. Azerbaijan Foreign Ministry spokesman Elkhan Polukhov initially stated that it was "too early" to discuss what steps his country might take in retaliation." Azerbaijani President İlham Aliyev failed to take part in the United Nations Alliance of Civilizations (UNAOC) meeting in Istanbul on 6–7 April, which was claimed to be a protest. There was a speculation in the Turkish press that Azerbaijan had received distorted information on the content of the Armenian-Turkish talks through Russian channels. Further developments proved those claims to be groundless.

There was also heated debate in the Turkish Parliament with the Nationalist Movement Party (MHP) leader, Devlet Bahçeli, who shared the Azerbaijanis' "rightful concerns" in warning the government: "Your approach to Armenia harms our dignity". The Republican People's Party (CHP) leader, Deniz Baykal, asked, "How can we ignore the ongoing occupation of Azerbaijan?" Both parties were dispatching delegations to Baku and hosting Azerbaijani politicians in Ankara.

Turkish Prime Minister Recep Tayyip Erdoğan attempted to ease those concerns by announcing, "Unless Azerbaijan and Armenia sign a protocol on Nagorno-Karabakh, we will not sign any final agreement with Armenia on ties. We are doing preliminary work but this definitely depends on resolution of the Nagorno-Karabakh problem". Turkish Foreign Minister Ali Babacan clarified that "we want a solution in which everybody is a winner" in a statement prior to the 15 April Black Sea Economic Cooperation (BSEC) Foreign Ministers Council in Yerevan: "We don't say, 'Let's first solve one problem and solve the other later.' We want a similar process to start between Azerbaijan and Armenia. We are closely watching the talks between Azerbaijan and Armenia". Azerbaijani Foreign Minister Mahmud Mammad Guliev responded that the solution to both countries' problems should be tied to the solution of the dispute between Azerbaijan and Armenia and that Azerbaijanis believe that Turkey will protect their interests.

The International Crisis Group (ICG) issued a report on the normalisation: "The politicized debate whether to recognize as genocide the destruction of much of the Ottoman Armenian population and the stalemated Armenia-Azerbaijan conflict over Nagorno-Karabakh should not halt momentum. ... The unresolved Armenia-Azerbaijan conflict over Nagorno-Karabakh still risks undermining full adoption and implementation of the potential package deal between Turkey and Armenia. ... Bilateral détente with Armenia ultimately could help Baku recover territory better than the current stalemate".

=== Failure and cancellation of proposed Azerbaijan–Turkey visa-free regime ===
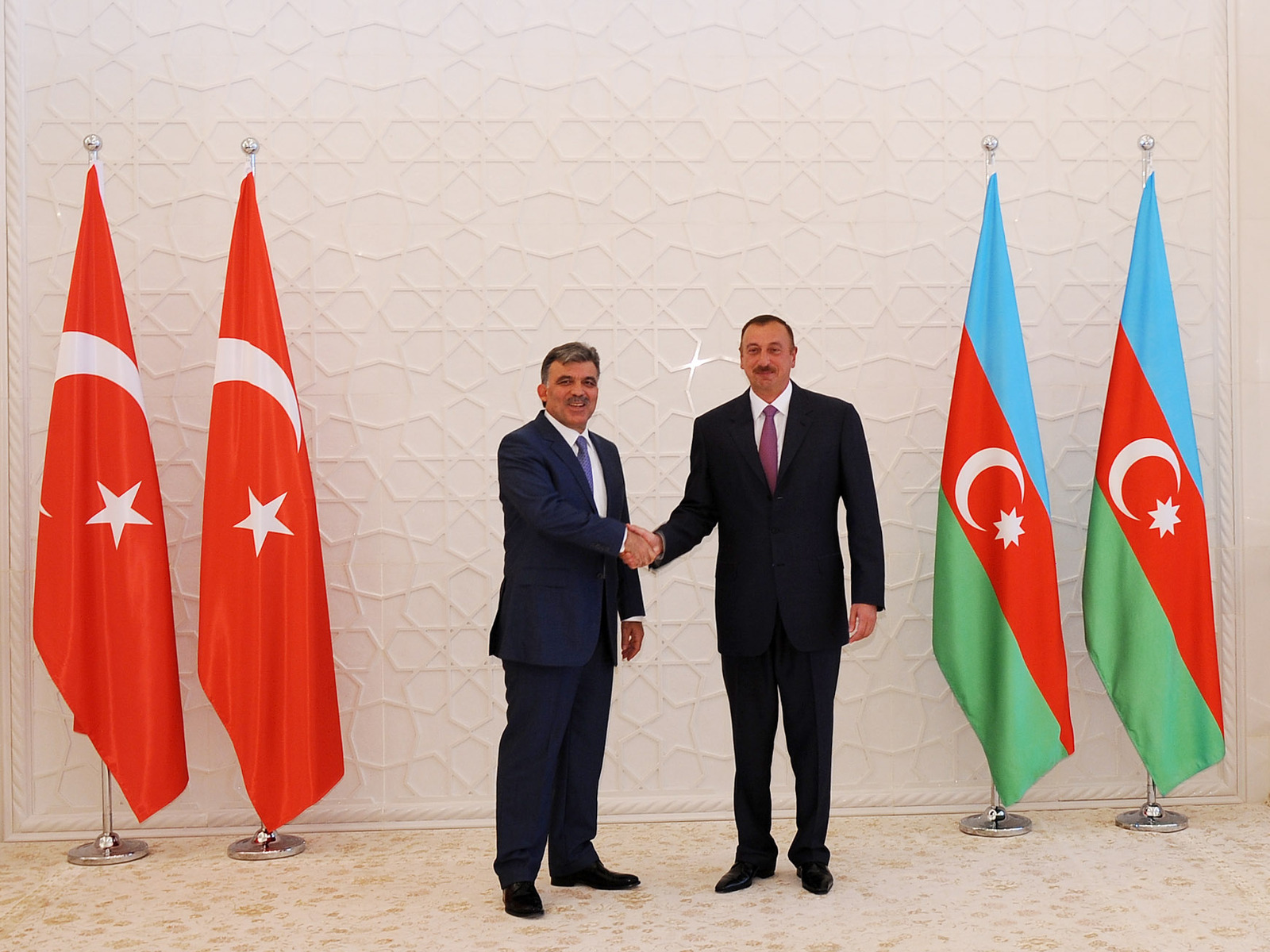
Turkish President Abdullah Gül meet with Azerbaijani President Ilham Aliyev in Baku, 16 August 2010

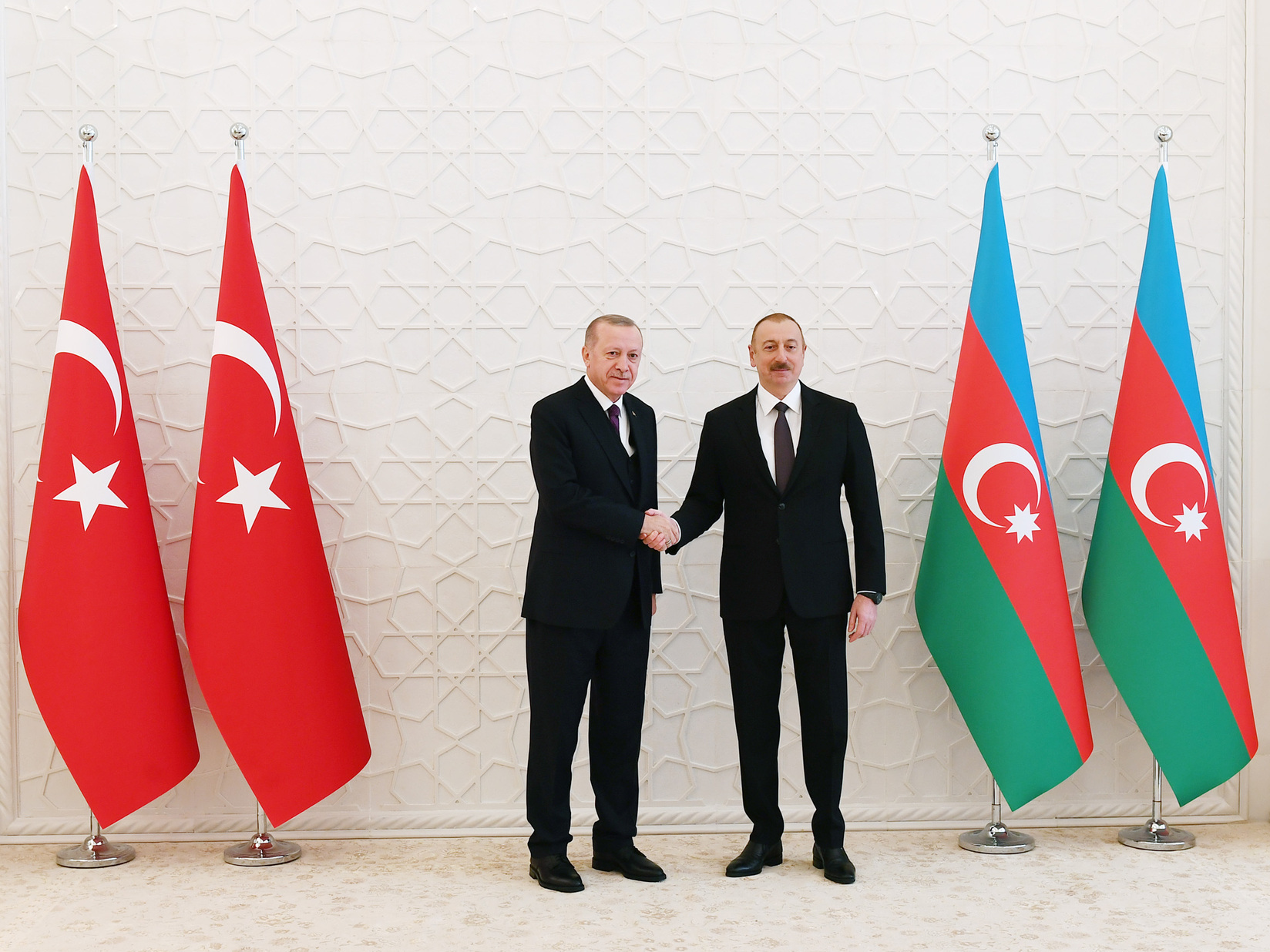
Turkish President Recep Tayyip Erdoğan meet with Azerbaijani President Ilham Aliyev in Baku, 25 February 2020

Azerbaijan agreed to a visa-free regime with Turkey while Iran also demanded the same visa-free regime with Azerbaijan. Iran had threatened to cut off the critical supply line between Azerbaijan and the Nakhchivan Autonomous Republic if Azerbaijan lifted visa requirements for Turkish citizens but not extend the same privilege to Iranian citizens. According to Azerbaijani diplomats, a visa-free travel regime proposed by Turkey in 2009 had fallen victim to Iranian pressure on Azerbaijan, prompting the last-minute cancellation of the deal between Baku and Ankara. Azerbaijani diplomats also said the national interests of Azerbaijan did not allow for an open-border policy with Iran since political instability in Iran may trigger a huge influx of Iranian ethnic Azeris refugees to Azerbaijan and did not want the proposed Turkey-Azerbaijan Visa-Free Regime to be reciprocal with Iran as well. Azerbaijan lifted visa requirements for Turkish citizens from 1 September 2019.

==== Strategic partnership ====
In June 2010, Azerbaijan and Turkey have signed key agreement on a package of Shah Deniz gas issues in Istanbul. The agreement also will open the way for securing supplies to the EU's flagship Nabucco gas pipeline project. On 16 September 2010, countries signed a treaty to establish Strategic Cooperation Council in Istanbul. In December 2010, National Assembly of Azerbaijan ratified on strategic partnership and mutual assistance between Azerbaijan and Turkey. The agreement consists of 23 articles and five chapters: Military-political and security issues, military and military-technical cooperation, humanitarian issues, economic cooperation, and common and final provisions.

The Ministry of Foreign Affairs stated in a written statement that the 2019 Turkish offensive into north-eastern Syria will serve to eliminate the terror risks, return of the refugees to their homes, solution of the humanitarian problems, and providing peace and stability within the territorial integrity of Syria.

The two countries have cooperated closely, particularly since the Second Karabakh War in 2020, where Turkey provided military support to Azerbaijan, including the use of Bayraktar TB2 drones. This collaboration has shifted the regional balance in the South Caucasus, diminishing Russia's influence. The strategic partnership extends beyond military matters, with Azerbaijan benefiting from enhanced access to European political and economic systems through its ties with Turkey. As Turkey strengthens its position in Europe and grows its influence in Central Asia, Azerbaijan's relationship with Turkey serves as a model for regional cooperation and diversification of foreign relations.

== Controversies ==
=== Relations with Israel, the Karabakh Victory and the headscarf ban ===
On 24 September 2026, Maksad Huseynov, a first secretary at Azerbaijan's Permanent Mission to the United Nations, stayed in the hall during Israeli Prime Minister Benjamin Netanyahu's speech to the UN General Assembly, which caused controversy. Huseynov's stance was assessed as reflecting Azerbaijan's foreign policy approach.

The incident received wide converge in the international media and was also met with a backlash in Turkey. Some circles accused Azerbaijan of betraying the Muslim world, while describing president Ilham Aliyev as "Israel's friend".

Speaking at the 8h congress of the New Azerbaijan Party on 2 October, 2026, Azerbaijani President Ilham Aliyev stressed that Azerbaijan peruses an independent foreign policy and that there should be no outside interference in the country's internal affairs. Noting that pressure on Azerbaijan had grown as the country became stronger and pursued a more independent policy. Aliyev said the "everyone should know their place" that there should be no interference in the country's internal affairs a "way of life" and that no one should tell Azerbaijan what to do. He also said that countries should take care of their own peoples and states.

Continuing his speech, Aliyev said that Azerbaijan's ideological sphere and foreign policy strategy must be cleansed of "foreign elements and foreign influence" and that his country needed no state's help or patronage. Arguing that Azerbaijan had not been given sufficient international support during the Nagorno-Karabakh conflict, Aliyev said that the military equipment and ammunition the country needed had been purchased by its own resources and that no discounts had been given on these purchases.

Although Aliyev did not name directly any country in his remarks, some media outlets and commentators in Turkey interpreted the statements as a response to criticism directed at Azerbaijan from Turkey. These commentaries pointed in particular to criticism from certain circles in Turkey regarding Azerbaijan's victory in the Second Karabkh War, its relations with Israel and the regulation on school clothing in Azerbaijan.

The linking of the statements to the headscarf debates in Turkey was connected to the discussion that arose over the situation of headscarf wearing students at some schools, following a regulation on dress codes in state schools in Azerbaijan in September 2026. Some Turkish media outlets interpreted Aliyev's remarks that there should be no outside interference in "our way of life" as a message aimed at this criticism. However, Aliyev did not directly mention Turkey or the headscarf regulation in his speech.

=== Turkey-Israel trade investigation by Azerbaijan's state agency APA ===
At a time that Azerbaijan was being criticized in the Turkish public sphere over the headscarf ban and over its good relation with Israel, the Azerbaijani state news agency APA published an investigation article on 6 October 2026 about Turkey's commercial relations with Israel. In the article titled "456 ships voyage from Turkey to Israel: the unseen side of "zero trade"", APA stated that it based its findings on AIS data, which tracks ships' position and movements.

According to APA's investigation, between 17 and 30 September 2026, six foreign flagged ships linked to Turkey made a total of 11 voyages to Israel's ports of Ashdod and Haifa. The investigation also claimed that between January and September 2025, 456 direct ships voyages were made from Turkish ports to Israel, 302 of them to Haifa and 154 to Ashdod. Comparing the data to Turkey's official statements that trade with Israel had been halted, APA argued that the cargoes carried by the ships and the commercial parties involved should be clarified.

A few hours after its publication on 6 October, the investigation was removed from APA's Azerbaijani English and Russian websites. No explanation was given for the removal. The full text however, continued to be published by the Azerbaijan based İcma.az, with APA cited as the source. The investigation was published four days after Ilham Aliyev's 2 October 2026 speech, which had caused controversy in Turkey. Although Aliyev had not directly named any country in that speech, in the debate in Turkey over Azerbaijan's relations with Israel and Baku's approach to criticism from Turkey, APA's publication and subsequent removal of the investigation into Turkey-Israel trade was assessed in the context of the dispute between the two countries.

== Economic relations ==
Location of the Baku–Tbilisi–Ceyhan pipeline

Azerbaijan and Turkey have subsequently built upon their linguistic and cultural ties to form a very close economic partnership that sees Turkey negotiating to buy natural gas from Azerbaijan and the two co-operating, along with neighbouring Georgia, in such infrastructure projects as the Baku–Tbilisi–Ceyhan pipeline, the South Caucasus Pipeline, Kars-Tbilisi-Baku railway and the proposed Trans-Anatolian gas pipeline all of which bypass Armenia despite a recent thaw in diplomatic relations between Ankara and Yerevan, which make them key players in European energy security. As BBC correspondent Chris Morris states, in The New Turkey (Granta Books, 2005), "Turkey lacks the great natural resources of the industrial age – oil and gas – and it has to import nearly all its energy supplies. But its proximity to Azerbaijan, the Caspian, and Central Asia, as well as to the Middle East, has allowed it to cultivate a new strategic role: the ‘missing link’ in a chain connecting these new producers of vast mineral resources with the consumer societies in Europe, America and beyond."

İlham Aliyev visited Turkey in 2003 shortly after first entering the Azerbaijani political scene at the behest of his ailing father Heydar Aliyev in a move that was interpreted at the time as an indication of political support from Turkish Prime Minister Recep Tayyip Erdoğan. In early January 2026 both countries announced a gas agreement in which, Azerbaijan will supply Turkey with 33 billion cubic meters of gas, starting 2029. The gas import will continue up to 2040, according to the agreement.

=== STAR ===
The opening of the STAR oil refinery, owned by the Azerbaijani State Oil Company SOCAR, was held in the Turkish city of Izmir on 19 October 2018. The foundation of STAR was laid on 25 October 2011, with the participation of Azerbaijani and Turkish Presidents Ilham Aliyev and Recep Tayyip Erdogan. The consortium consisting of Técnicas Reunidas (Spain), Saipem (Italy), GS Engineering & Construction Corp (South Korea) and Itochu (Japan) built the plant.

=== TANAP ===
The TANAP project was envisaged on 17 November 2011, at the Third Black Sea Energy and Economic Forum in Istanbul. The Memorandum of Understanding was signed between Azerbaijan and Turkey on the Trans Anatolian Gas Pipeline Project on 24 December 2011, in order to establish a consortium of the project with 20% (twenty percent) in accordance with the share of Turkey and 80% (eighty percent) in accordance with the share of the Republic of Azerbaijan.

Recep Tayyip Erdogan, Ilham Aliyev, and Georgy Margvelashvili officially met in the city of Kars in Eastern Turkey to lay the foundation of the pipeline on 17 March 2015. The construction of the gas pipeline began in 2015 and completed in June 2018.

On 21 November 2018, the Trans-Anatolian Gas Pipeline (TANAP) joined the Trans-Adriatic Pipeline (TAP) at the Turkish-Greek border near Meric River. Through the TAP, the Azerbaijani gas will be transported to Europe from the Shah Deniz field.

== Military relations ==
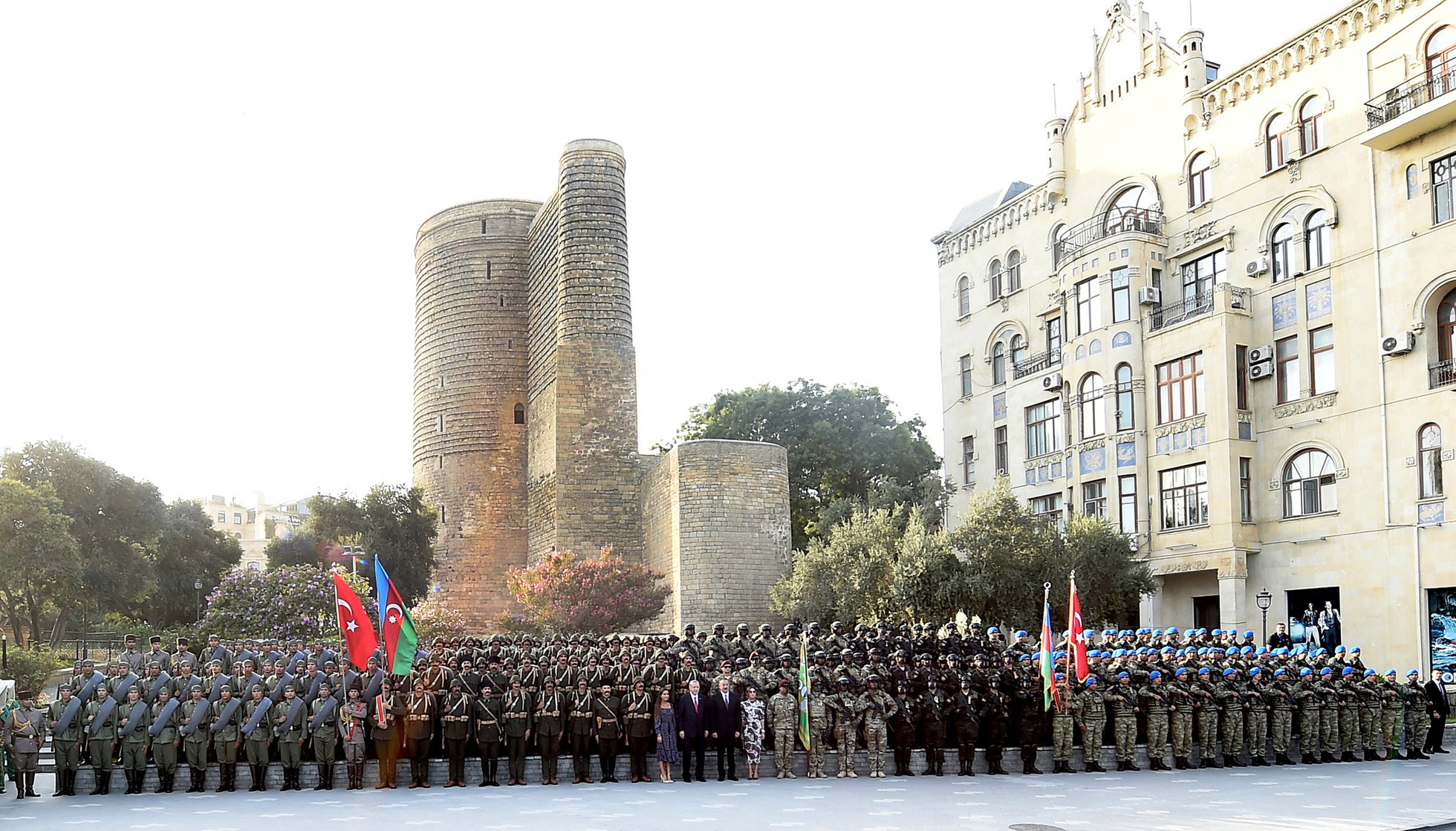
Turkish and Azerbaijani troops standing together in Baku

Military cooperation between Azerbaijan and Turkey first emerged in 1992, with an agreement signed between the two governments on military education and weapon equipment and deals to help strengthen the bond between the two nations. Since then, the Azerbaijani and the Turkish governments have closely cooperated on defense and security. The Training and Education Center of the Armed Forces was established in accordance with the protocol which was signed between Azerbaijan and the Turkish Armed Forces on 5 April 2000.

In June 2010, Azerbaijani military company Azersimtel announced that it had reached an agreement with the Turkish Mechanical and Chemical Industry Corporation (MKE) on launching a joint military facility. According to Turkish Defense Minister Vecdi Gonul, Turkish military assistance to Azerbaijan exceeded $200 million in 2010. In the first stage of production, the company is expected to produce military arms venture for the Azerbaijani Armed Forces.

In December 2010, both countries signed a range of treaties that makes each other a guarantor in case of an attack by foreign forces. The Treaty would enter into force upon the exchange of instruments of ratification and valid for 10 years. In addition, the term extended for another 10 years if in the last 6 months, there is no notification to terminate the treaty.

More than 20 Turkish defense industry companies have co-operative and commercial relations with Azerbaijan.

On 29 January 2013, TAKM (Organization of the Eurasian Law Enforcement Agencies with Military Status) was formed as an intergovernmental military law enforcement (gendarmerie) organization of three Turkic countries (Azerbaijan, Kyrgyzstan and Turkey) and Mongolia.

Aliyev stated on 13 August 2020 that they wanted to benefit from the Turkish defense industry and that Turkey was Azerbaijan's most important defense industry partner. He also stated that Turkey was the first country to provide full support to Azerbaijan against Armenia's attacks.

Azerbaijani Defense Minister Colonel General Zakir Hasanov announced that in 2021 the Azerbaijani Armed Forces will take the Turkish military as a model and will be organized accordingly. Military cooperation between Turkey and Azerbaijan evolved into a very high-level cooperation after the 2020 Karabakh war. The two armed forces adopted a common approach in terms of weapons, tactics, and intelligence. During this period, the Azerbaijani army entered a transition phase from a Soviet-style structure to NATO standards. The two armies later held a joint exercise on the Iranian border.

While serving in the Turkish Armed Forces with the rank of Lieutenant General, Bahtiyar Ersay was transferred to the Azerbaijani Army on 15 December 2022 and was appointed as an advisor to the Azerbaijani Minister of Defense. Until this date, Ersay served as the commander of the 7th Corps based in Diyarbakır in the Turkish Armed Forces. It was the first time in the history of the Turkish Armed Forces that an active-duty Turkish general was transferred to another army.

=== Nagorno-Karabakh conflict ===
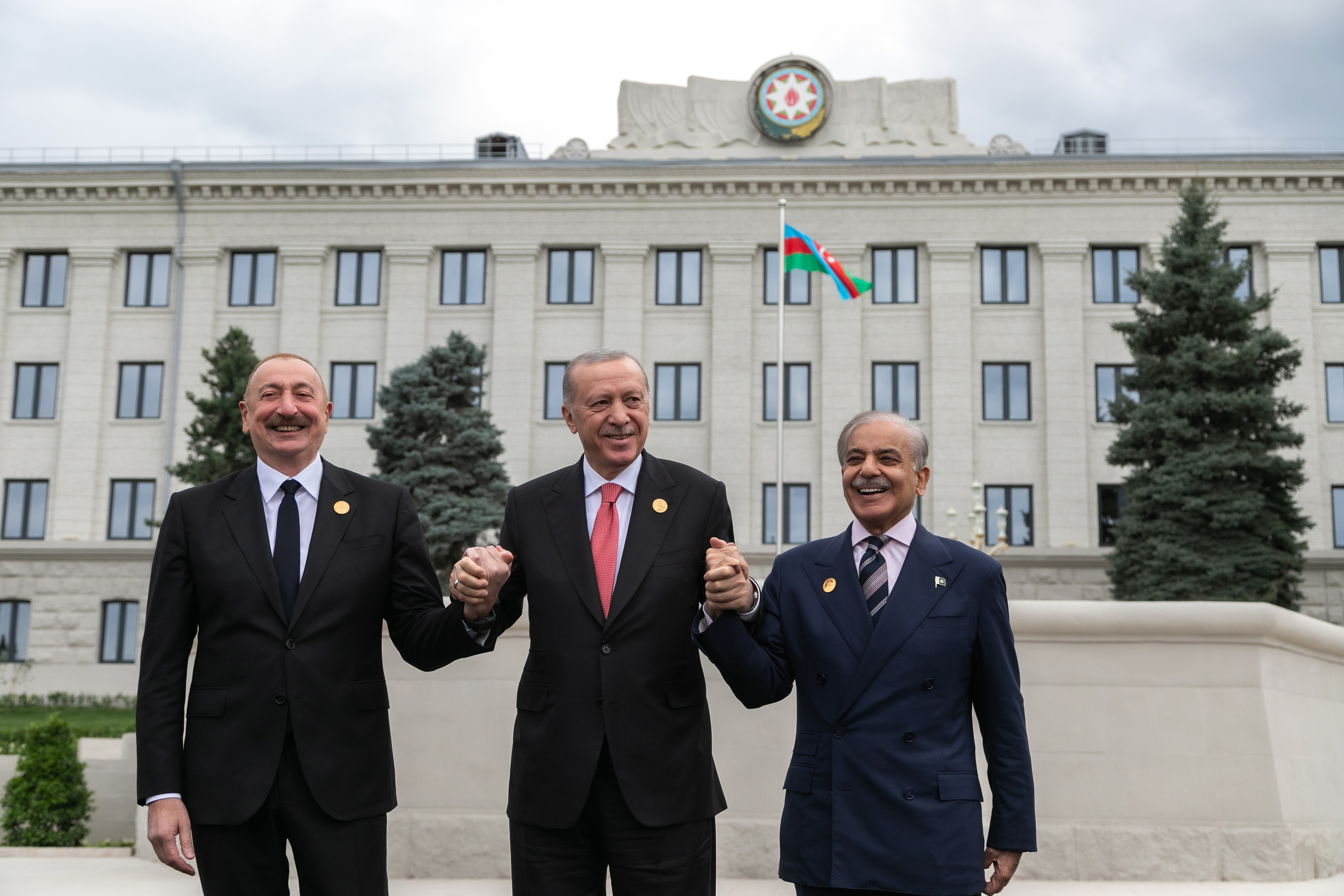
Azerbaijani President Aliyev, Turkish President Erdoğan and Pakistani Prime Minister Shehbaz Sharif in Stepanakert, Nagorno-Karabakh, July 2025

A war between Azerbaijan and neighbouring Armenia broke out shortly after the parliament of Nagorno-Karabakh, an autonomous oblast in Azerbaijan, voted to unify the region with Armenia on 20 February 1988. The Armenian demand to unify Karabakh with Armenia, which proliferated in the late 1980s, began in a relatively peaceful manner; however, as the Soviet Union's disintegration neared, the dispute gradually grew into a violent conflict between the ethnic groups in Nagorno-Karabakh, resulting in ethnic cleansing by all sides. The declaration of secession from Azerbaijan was the final result of the territorial conflict regarding the land.

Following a UN Security Council resolution on 6 April 1993, calling for the immediate withdrawal of Armenian forces from the Azerbaijani district of Kelbajar, Turkey joined Azerbaijan in imposing a full economic embargo on Armenia, and the border between the two states was closed. The border subsequently remained closed, as Turkey demanded the withdrawal of Armenia from Nagorno-Karabakh and seven surrounding districts of Azerbaijan. Turkey made the demand a condition for establishing diplomatic relations with Armenia.

Turkey supported Azerbaijan politically, supplied arms, and held joint military drills to improve combat interoperability since the 2020 Nagorno-Karabakh War. In September 2022, at a United Nations news conference, Turkish Defense Minister Hulusi Akar reiterated Turkey's support for Azerbaijan in its conflict with Armenia.

On 10 August 2020, six Turkish F-16s from the Turkish Air Force traveled from Turkey to Azerbaijan to participate in the TurAz Qartali-2020 exercise. Some news sources determined through satellite images that these planes did not leave Azerbaijan when the Second Karabakh War began and remained at Ganja airport. Azerbaijani President Aliyev confirmed that the planes were in the country but stated that they did not participate in the conflict. In contrast, Aliyev said, "In the event of an external attack on Azerbaijan, you will see Turkish planes in the sky." Armenia claimed that a SU-25 fighter jet from its air force was shot down by Turkish F-16s, but Turkey and Azerbaijan denied this.

=== Military Base ===
The Azerbaijani military doctrine adopted in 2010 allows for foreign military bases in Azerbaijan, and that action opened the way to speculation that Turkey could quarter its troops in the Nakhchivan region, an Azerbaijani exclave surrounded by Armenia and Turkey. Azerbaijan maintains a base in Nakhchivan that has received heavy Turkish support in the past, but no official information is available about the current scope of military cooperation between the two countries in the exclave.

== High-level visits ==
On 11 August 2020, the Foreign Minister of Azerbaijan Jeyhun Bayramov paid his first visit to Turkey after being appointed for the position of Azerbaijan's new foreign minister.

== Resident diplomatic missions ==
of Azerbaijan in Turkey

- Ankara (Embassy)
- Istanbul (Consulate-General)
- Kars (Consulate-General)
- Iğdır (Consular Mission)

of Turkey in Azerbaijan

- Baku (Embassy)
- Ganja (Consulate-General)
- Nakhchivan (Consulate-General)

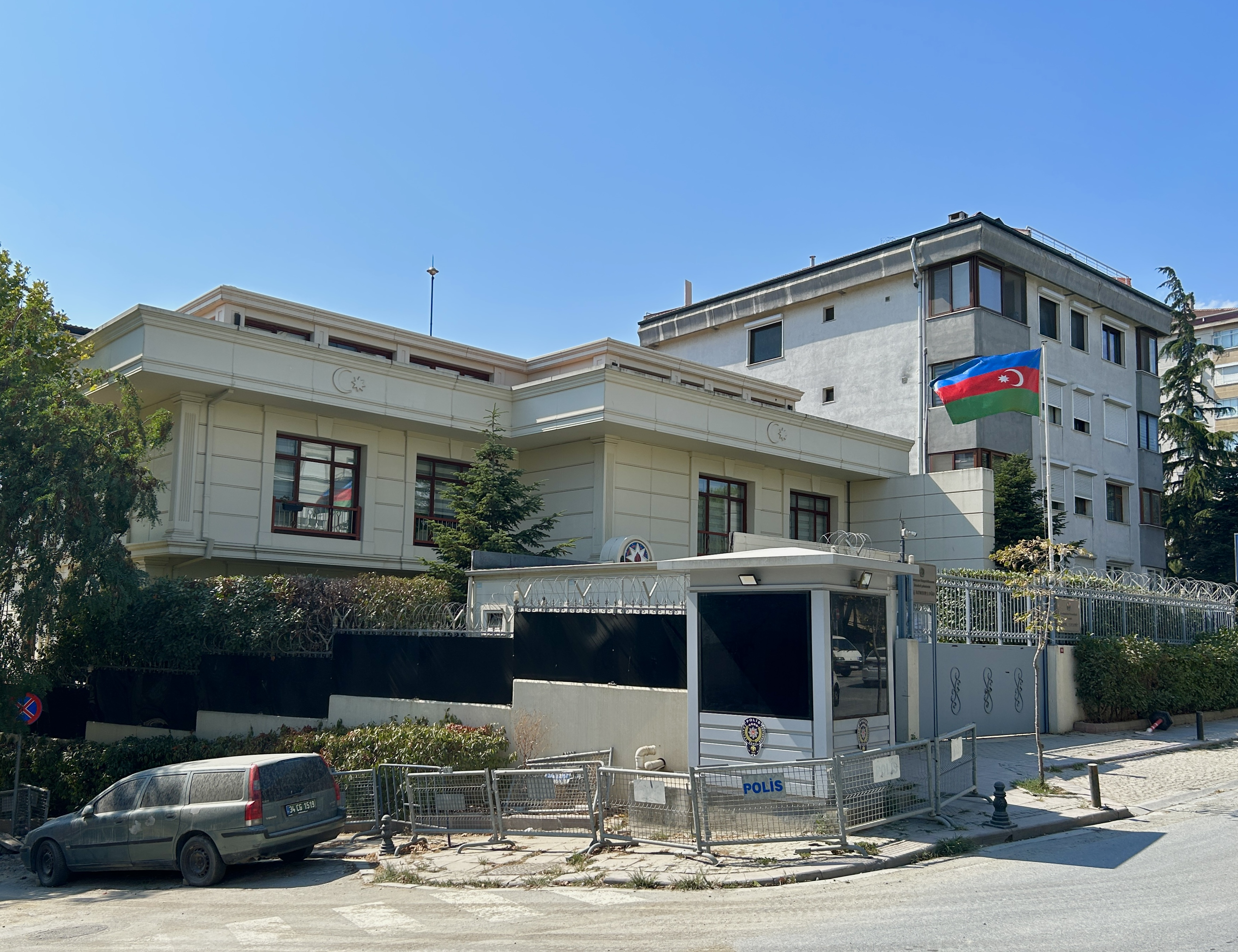
Consulate-General of Azerbaijan in Istanbul

== See also ==
- Foreign relations of Azerbaijan
- Foreign relations of Turkey
- Armenia–Turkey relations
- Azerbaijan–Turkey border
- Azerbaijanis in Turkey
- List of ambassadors of Turkey to Azerbaijan
- Eurasianism
- Caucasus Army Group (Ottoman Empire)
- Battle of Baku
- Mustafa Kemal Atatürk Monument, Baku
- Organization of Turkic States
- Turanism
- Turks in Azerbaijan
- Azerbaijan–European Union relations
- Turkey–European Union relations
- Turkish–Azeri blockade of Armenia
- Soviet Union–Turkey relations
