= Mecca Defence Alliance =

Intergovernmental military alliance in Muslim world

(in official languages)
Arabic	حلف مكة الدفاعي
Turkish	Mekke Savunma İttifakı
Urdu	مکہ دفاعی اتحاد
- Member states shown in dark green
- Abbreviation: MDA
- Formation: 7 August 2026 (3 months ago)
- Type: Military alliance
- Headquarters: Riyadh, Saudi Arabia
- Members: Pakistan; Saudi Arabia; Turkey
- Secretary General: Lt. Gen. Nauman Mahmood
- Main organ: Strategic Political and Defence Committee

Mecca Joint Defence Agreement
- Type: Military alliance
- Signed: 7 August 2026
- Location: Mecca, Saudi Arabia
- Effective: 14 November 2026
- Condition: Effective upon ratification by all parties
- Parties: 3: Pakistan; Saudi Arabia; Turkey
- Ratifiers: Saudi Arabia, October 2026; Pakistan, 23 October 2026; Turkey, 14 November 2026

The Mecca Defence Alliance, (Note: (Arabic) حلف مكة الدفاعي (Turkish) Mekke Savunma İttifakı (Urdu) مکہ دفاعی اتحاد) formerly the Mecca Joint Defence Agreement, also known as the Mecca Pact or Mecca Alliance, is an intergovernmental military alliance in the Muslim world that was signed into force by Pakistan, Saudi Arabia, and Turkey on 7 August 2026. It builds upon the earlier Strategic Mutual Defence Agreement signed between Pakistan and Saudi Arabia on 17 September 2025 to include Turkey. The pact's ratification was officially announced amidst the 2026 Iran war and conducted in October-November 2026.

The Mecca Defence Alliance enshrines a collective security arrangement modelled on Article 5 of NATO, with its official announcement stating that "any armed attack against any one of the three states shall be regarded as an attack against them all." The trilateral pact has been described by Steven A. Cook as a "major change" in Middle East geopolitics and the first institutional arrangement of its kind in the region.

== Background ==
Saudi Arabia and Pakistan first established a bilateral collective-defence commitment through the Strategic Mutual Defence Agreement (SMDA), signed on 17 September 2025 at Al-Yamamah Palace in Riyadh by Crown Prince Mohammed bin Salman and Prime Minister Shehbaz Sharif. That agreement formalised decades of military co-operation between the two countries, during which Pakistan had long provided training and technical assistance to Saudi forces. Turkey and Pakistan had separately deepened their own defence ties, exchanging warships and training aircraft and in 2023, Saudi Arabia agreed to purchase Turkish drones. By mid-2026, Pakistan deployed several thousand troops, fighter aircraft, drones and an air-defence system, to Saudi Arabia, and opened talks with Kuwait in July 2026 on an expanded security arrangement.

The trilateral pact was signed amid rising regional tensions in the Middle East. Saudi Arabia, alongside other Arab nations, was struck by Iran, after the opening of the 2026 Iran war, which threatened oil exports and stability. Turkey and Pakistan, while less directly exposed to the fighting, were reportedly concerned about growing instability.

== Signing ==
Pakistani Prime Minister Shehbaz Sharif arrived in Jeddah on 6 August 2026 and performed the Umrah pilgrimage in Mecca the following day while Turkish president Recep Tayyip Erdoğan met Crown Prince Mohammed bin Salman. The collective security agreement was formally concluded in Mecca.

=== Official statement ===
At the gracious invitation of the Custodian of the Two Holy Mosques King Salman bin Abdulaziz Al Saud, the President of the Republic of Türkiye, H.E. Mr. Recep Tayyip Erdoğan, and the Prime Minister of the Islamic Republic of Pakistan, H.E. Mr. Muhammad Shehbaz Sharif, paid a visit to the Kingdom of Saudi Arabia, on 24 Safar 1448H, corresponding to August 7, 2026.

His Royal Highness Prince Mohammed bin Salman bin Abdulaziz Al Saud, Crown Prince and Prime Minister received H.E. the President of Türkiye, and H.E. the Prime Minister of the Islamic Republic of Pakistan, at Al-Safa Palace in Makkah, where the Makkah Al-Mukarramah Summit for Joint Defence was held, during which the distinguished relations between the Kingdom of Saudi Arabia, the Republic of Türkiye and the Islamic Republic of Pakistan were reviewed, along with a number of issues of mutual interest.

Guided by the longstanding historical ties among the three States, based on the enduring bonds of brotherhood and Islamic solidarity that unite them, and building upon their shared strategic interests and longstanding defence co-operation, His Royal Highness Prince Mohammed bin Salman bin Abdulaziz Al Saud, Crown Prince and Prime Minister of Saudi Arabia, H.E. Mr. Recep Tayyip Erdoğan, President of the Republic of Türkiye, and H.E. Mr. Muhammed Shehbaz Sharif, Prime Minister of the Islamic Republic of Pakistan, signed the Makkah Joint Defence Agreement, reflecting the three States’ shared commitment to further strengthening their collective security and to promoting peace, security, and stability in the region and beyond, in pursuit of a secure and prosperous future.

The Agreement is intended to strengthen collective deterrence against any act of aggression, and stipulates that any armed attack against any one of the three States shall be regarded as an attack against them all. It further provides for the enhancement of all aspects of defence co-operation among the three States.

Makkah

07 August 2026

— Saudi Arabia, Türkiye, and Pakistan Issue Joint Statement of the Makkah Al-Mukarramah Summit for Joint Defence

== Provisions ==
The agreement consists of 16 articles covering collective defence, military and security co-operation, defence-industrial development, intelligence sharing, logistical support, institutional coordination, confidentiality and the agreement's entry into force and termination.

=== Article 1: Sovereignty and territorial integrity ===
The parties undertake to co-operate in safeguarding one another's independence, sovereignty, territorial integrity and internationally recognised borders. If any party's territorial integrity, sovereignty or internationally recognised borders are threatened or endangered, the parties are to use all necessary means to eliminate the threat or danger.

=== Article 2: Collective defence and mutual assistance ===
An armed attack originating externally against any party is to be considered an attack against all parties. If a party suffers an armed attack or military aggression by another country or group of countries, the other parties are to provide immediate assistance using the means of mutual assistance available to them.

The scope and nature of the assistance are to be determined following an objective assessment of the assistance required, in accordance with the right of individual and collective self-defence recognised by Article 51 of the United Nations Charter. The parties are to co-operate within the limits of their available resources, including military means and capabilities.

=== Article 3: Defence and security co-operation ===
The parties undertake to co-operate in defence, the defence industry and security, develop relations among their armed forces, and carry out agreed activities intended to strengthen defence co-operation.

=== Article 4: Security consultations ===
The parties are to hold regular consultations on international security matters. They also undertake to assist one another and develop individual and joint measures based on common assessments, with the stated objectives of protecting vital interests and national security and eliminating threats and dangers to their security.

=== Article 5: Counterterrorism ===
The parties undertake to strengthen existing co-operation and joint efforts, including at the operational level, against terrorism in all its forms and manifestations that adversely affect regional and international stability and security.

=== Article 6: Military training and interoperability ===
In peacetime and wartime, the parties are to encourage reciprocal exchanges of personnel among defence institutions, joint training programmes and exercises, and deployments and other activities intended to increase interoperability among their armed forces and develop their defence capabilities.

=== Article 7: Defence industry and technology ===
The parties are to support technology sharing, joint technology development, joint production and co-operation among defence-industry organisations on the basis of mutual agreement. The areas of co-operation specified in the agreement include:

- Encouraging joint production in the defence sector.
- Conducting joint research and development projects in technologies requiring specialised expertise.
- Training personnel and supporting military industries within the parties' territories through experts from any of the parties.
- Sharing expertise and lessons learned in defence industry, research and development, and innovation.
- Pursuing other areas of co-operation agreed upon by the parties.

=== Article 8: Institutional structure and accession ===
The agreement establishes a Strategic Political and Defence Committee composed of the foreign ministers, defence ministers and chiefs of general staff of the core parties. The committee is responsible for providing strategic direction for joint defence, developing defence and security co-operation, and addressing obstacles to implementation.

The committee is to meet twice a year, with the host rotating among the parties. Leaders may meet annually if considered necessary. The committee may establish subcommittees, while additional agreements or protocols may be negotiated to implement the co-operation envisaged by the agreement.

Accession procedures and principles for additional parties are to be determined and approved by consensus of the core parties.

A secretariat is to be established in Saudi Arabia to serve the committee. Its organisation, establishment and operating procedures are to be determined by consensus of the core parties. The secretariat is to be headed by a secretary-general appointed for a three-year term on a rotational basis among the core parties, with the first secretary-general being a Pakistani citizen. The article also specifies that the agreement does not prejudice the work of existing military co-operation committees among the parties.

=== Article 9: Intelligence sharing ===
The parties undertake to deepen intelligence co-operation and co-ordinate their activities by sharing intelligence through mutually agreed secure channels. Such sharing is subject to information-security, data-protection and confidentiality requirements.

=== Article 10: Logistical support ===
Subject to the availability and compatibility of logistical support services, the parties are to provide one another with logistical assistance in peacetime, wartime and other emergencies. The specified forms of assistance include weapons, ammunition, fuel, spare parts and other equipment.

=== Article 11: Legal implementation ===
Without prejudice to international law and the relevant domestic laws of the parties, the agreement is to serve as the legal basis for implementing its provisions. The parties are also to propose additional legal measures where necessary.

=== Article 12: Existing international agreements ===
The agreement does not prejudice the rights and obligations of the parties arising from international agreements they have previously concluded.

=== Article 13: Protection of classified information ===
The parties undertake to protect classified information and documents obtained under the agreement in accordance with their national legislation. Such information and documents are not to be shared with states, companies or individuals outside the parties. Access is restricted to individuals with the appropriate security clearance and a demonstrable need to know.

=== Article 14: Settlement of disputes ===
Disputes concerning the interpretation or implementation of the agreement are to be resolved amicably through consultations and discussions among the parties.

=== Article 15: Amendments ===
The agreement may be amended through consultations and unanimous agreement among the core parties.

=== Article 16: Ratification, duration and withdrawal ===
The agreement is subject to ratification under the procedures applicable in each party's jurisdiction. It enters into force on the date the final instrument of ratification is deposited with the secretariat of the Strategic Political and Defence Committee.

The agreement remains in force indefinitely. A party may withdraw only after ten years have elapsed from the agreement's entry into force, by notifying the other parties in writing through diplomatic channels at least three months in advance.

Termination or withdrawal does not affect ongoing activities or projects agreed upon before the relevant date. Obligations concerning the protection of classified information and the prevention of its disclosure continue after termination or withdrawal.

The agreement was signed in Mecca on 7 August 2026. It was executed in three original copies in Turkish, Arabic and English, with all three texts declared equally authentic. In the event of differences in interpretation, the English text is to prevail.

== Analysis ==
Analysts described the Jeddah–Mecca summit as symbolically significant, bringing together three influential Muslim-majority states at a moment of heightened regional uncertainty, and as a sign of growing security co-ordination among regional middle powers. Reactions to the pact's predecessor, the September 2025 Saudi–Pakistan agreement, had been mixed: Iranian state media described that earlier pact as non-threatening and potentially a step toward a broader regional security framework, while India maintained a neutral public position.

Nawaf Obaid, a senior fellow at the Department of War Studies at King's College London, commented that the agreement is the beginning of a new defence structure for the region. He called it "the beginning of the post-American Middle East – not a region without the US, but one no longer dependent upon American power to organise its security".

Al Jazeera described the agreement as a potential framework for closer strategic, military and defence-industrial co-operation among Saudi Arabia, Pakistan and Turkey. Defence analyst Mansoor Ahmed, of the Australian National University's Strategic and Defence Studies Centre, said the pact was better understood as a framework for regional security and defence co-operation than as an alliance directly comparable with NATO.

An additional analysis published by Al Jazeera on 8 August 2026 examined the implications of the agreement for the role of the United States in Middle Eastern security. It noted that the Trump administration had not issued a formal response to the agreement at the time of publication. Analysts cited in the article generally viewed the pact as an effort by regional states to broaden their security partnerships while maintaining their existing relations with the United States. Kristian Coates Ulrichsen of the Baker Institute said that doubts about the reliability of US security partnerships had developed over more than a decade and had been intensified by the 2026 Iran war. He argued that new defence agreements were intended to provide additional strategic options rather than replace the United States. Sina Toossi of the Centre for International Policy similarly described the agreement as an indication that regional states were reassessing their security arrangements, with Saudi Arabia potentially seeking to expand its network of security partnerships. Yasmine Farouk of the International Crisis Group offered a more cautious assessment, noting that all three signatories remained US partners and that the agreement did not necessarily indicate a move towards confrontation with Iran. She said the pact could instead serve as a form of deterrence and contribute to longer-term regional security co-operation.

The Guardian linked the pact to a broader effort by regional states to develop their own security arrangements amid continuing instability in the Middle East. It also noted that the agreement could face an early test from the conflict involving the Houthi movement and Saudi Arabia.

Former Turkish diplomat Mustafa Enes Esen told Turkish Minute that the agreement was largely symbolic and that Turkey was unlikely to be drawn into conflicts with Iran or India unless the pact developed a joint military command and military structures. As of 31 August, the pact had yet to develop integrated joint command structures.

Trump's support for the Mecca Defence Alliance helps Washington present declining Gulf confidence as successful burden-sharing. However, the pact could eventually reduce American control.

Doga Eralp, an associate professor of security studies at the Marine Corps University, argues that the defence pact remains an untested and "high-stakes political experiment" rather than a credible new deterrence architecture. According to him, its credibility is weakened by limited operational integration, unclear commitments on when and how members would respond to aggression, and the absence of effective mechanisms for managing escalation. Eralp cautions that the pact's "strategic ambiguity" toward Iran and Israel, combined with possible alliance entrapment and regional polarisation, could intensify rather than reduce insecurity.

Kamran Bokhari, a Washington-based analyst on Pakistan-Iran relations, said while Tehran engages Islamabad precisely because of its "alignment with Riyadh and Washington," the Houthi attacks and Mecca Defence Alliance could turn Pakistan from a stakeholder to a "combatant."

== Implementation and subsequent developments ==
=== Ratification of the agreement ===
In order to become effective, the alliance had to be ratified by all three signatories. The Saudi government ratified it in October 2026. On 23 October 2026, the treaty was ratified by the Pakistani government. It was ratified by the Turkish Parliament on 5 November 2026. The act of ratification was signed by the President on 13 November and was published the following day. As Article 16 stipulated the agreement to come into effect the day the last ratification is made, it became operative on 14 November 2026.

=== Response to the Houthi attacks ===
The effectiveness and credibility of the defence pact have come under question following the absence of a military response from Pakistan and Turkey to Houthi attacks on Saudi Arabia, including attacks affecting the holy city of Mecca.

On 10 September 2026, Pakistan stated that it was not considering an immediate military response under the Mecca Defence Alliance following recent Houthi attacks on Saudi Arabia. The statement indicated that Pakistan's response at that stage would remain primarily diplomatic rather than involve direct military action.

In the aftermath of waves of Houthi attacks against Saudi Arabia, the lack of a military response from Turkey and Pakistan raised questions about the practical effectiveness of the Mecca Defence Alliance. The Atlantic subsequently reported that the Houthi attacks had put the value of the Mecca Alliance into doubt, noting that neither Islamabad nor Ankara had shown an inclination to assist Saudi Arabia despite the attacks. The Jerusalem Post similarly reported that the attacks raised questions about the credibility of the defence arrangement after Turkey and Pakistan did not respond militarily. Meanwhile, both Turkey and Pakistan initially said they had not received a request from Saudi Arabia for support under the trilateral Mecca defence pact, even as the kingdom sought help from other allies amid an escalating standoff with Yemen's Houthis, according to officials cited by the Associated Press. However, parliamentary ratification or the completion of the required domestic legal procedures in Pakistan and Turkey were necessary for the agreement to become fully legally effective, its implementation may remain subject to those processes. Therefore, parliamentary approval in both countries would be an important step toward giving the agreement full domestic legal effect and strengthening the credibility of its collective-defence commitments.

Consequently, Saudi Arabia had to request US assistance despite the agreement as the Houthis seized Mocha and strengthened their position around Bab al-Mandab because neither Turkey nor Pakistan could immediately commit to a military response. Mohammed bin Salman had to directly reach out to the US administration instead.

The Mecca Joint Defence Agreement was signed in August by Saudi Arabia, Turkey, and Pakistan in the Saudi city of Mecca. Under its terms, an attack on any one of the three signatories is treated as an attack on all. The pact commits Pakistan and Turkey to providing military support to Riyadh should Houthi attacks escalate. To date, however, neither Islamabad nor Ankara has announced any military action against the Houthis.

On 5 October 2026, the pact was invoked. The joint deterrence measures initially included the "rapid deployment" of Pakistani and Turkish troops to Saudi Arabia. However, Turkey would limit itself to just defensive and technical support to the kingdom.

Later in October, Saudi Arabia and Syria discussed possible involvement of Syrian troops in Yemen as the kingdom could not receive much active support from its allies despite the agreement being put to action. According to Axios, the Trump administration had been informed of Saudi-Syrian contacts and did not object to Damascus potentially taking part in a planned operation.

On 26 October 2026, officials from Saudi Arabia, Pakistan, and Turkey met with Iranian leaders.

== Reactions ==
=== Iran ===
Iran gave a mixed response to the agreement. Foreign Minister Abbas Araghchi welcomed the agreement and called for greater unity among Muslim-majority countries, while urging them to rely on their own capabilities. He also praised Iran's armed forces and linked the agreement to a broader call for regional self-reliance. Iranian parliamentarian Ebrahim Rezaei, a member of the National Security and Foreign Policy Commission, took a more critical view, arguing that a defence agreement between Saudi Arabia, Turkey and Pakistan would not by itself provide security for Saudi Arabia. He urged Riyadh to reconsider its approach to regional security.

In October 2026, when the pact was invoked, Iran sharpened its criticism. Foreign Ministry spokesman Esmail Baghaei stated that the countries of the region were "well aware" that "any intervention in the Yemen issue could have undesirable consequences for the region." Alaeddin Boroujerdi, a member of National Security and Foreign Policy Committee, said that Turkish and Pakistani involvement in the Saudi conflict with Houthis would neither weaken the group nor restrict its ability to operate in the Bab al-Mandeb Strait. He additionally stated that the entry of Pakistan and Turkey would "definitely work to their own detriment" claiming how the previous Saudi coalition over Yemen was "defeated" after seven years of war. Iranian state media described the decision as "Turkey and Pakistan join the Saudi war against the Yemeni people" and called that pact an "alliance against the oppressed people of Yemen." However, other sources claim Iran was invited to join the agreement.

=== India ===
India's Ministry of External Affairs said that India valued its strategic partnership with Saudi Arabia and expected Riyadh to take India's "interests and sensitivities" into account.

India's External Affairs Minister S. Jaishankar subsequently questioned what the pact had actually demonstrated in response to the "live military situations" faced by its three members.

=== Pakistan ===
In Pakistan, following the signing of the agreement, public celebrations were held in several Pakistani cities. In Islamabad, public buildings were illuminated and decorated with the flags of Pakistan, Saudi Arabia, and Turkey, while a flag march was held by the Islamabad Police. In Lahore, a cycle rally and a concert were held at Liberty Chowk, followed by a fireworks display. Billboards displaying the leaders of the three countries were also erected in Karachi.

== Potential expansion ==
Following the signing ceremony on 7 August 2026 by the three founding members—Turkey, Saudi Arabia, and Pakistan—the Mecca Defence Alliance holds potential to transform into a broader regional security architecture and multinational pact. In the period following the signing, expansion scenarios gained widespread coverage in the international press and diplomatic circles.

=== Bangladesh ===
In August 2026, Bangladesh's Foreign Affairs Adviser Humaiun Kobir stated that Bangladesh maintains a positive view of the Mecca Joint Defence Agreement and would consider it positively if Bangladesh was invited to join. He also noted that Prime Minister Tarique Rahman's visit to Riyadh is likely to be finalised soon, while Dhaka is strengthening bilateral ties with Pakistan in trade and people-to-people connectivity.

=== Egypt ===
According to a report provided by Middle East Eye, the foreign ministers of Egypt, Pakistan, Saudi Arabia, and Turkey held talks on the side-lines of the March 2026 Riyadh Summit of Arab and Islamic nations. The report stated that Turkey wanted to bring Egypt into a quadrilateral defence agreement, but this has not yet materialised. According to The Guardian, Turkish president Erdogan said that:

The alliance would be open to other countries.

The Turkish foreign minister Hakan Fidan said that:

Egypt could join the agreement, once technical matters are resolved.

Obstacles for Egypt to join the pact are its existing agreements with Greece and Cyprus and hesitance to join an alliance that requires them to unconditionally support allies in military conflicts.

=== Syria ===
At the end of October 2026, reports emerged that Syria was considering joining the Mecca Defence Alliance.

The Associated Press reported on 6 November 2026 that Syria had expressed interest in joining the alliance, but representatives of the existing members said that its expansion was not then under consideration.

== Governance and facilities ==
Turkish foreign minister Hakan Fidan said that the pact would function similarly to NATO, with a minister's committee, political and military committees, and a permanent secretariat to oversee the implementation of decisions. The permanent general secretariat is based in Riyadh, Saudi Arabia, with the first secretariat-general being from Pakistan.

The Strategic Political and Defence Committee (SPDC) is the primary governing, political, and military co-ordination body of the MDA. Established alongside the alliance's permanent secretariat in August 2026, the committee acts as the operational and decision-making engine responsible for institutionalising collective security and deterrence among member states. The SPDC held its first session in Istanbul on 31 August 2026. A second session was held in Riyadh on 5 October, and a third session is expected in Islamabad in late November 2026.

== See also ==
- Multinational Maritime Defence Alliance, established in Saudi Arabia in July 2026
- 2026 Saudi Arabia–United States nuclear deal, signed in July 2026
- Iran–Saudi Arabia proxy war, since 1979
- Islamic Military Counter Terrorism Coalition
- Protocol Agreement-2026 (Pakistan–Kuwait)
- Central Treaty Organization
- Badr Memorandum of Understanding
