= List of international prime ministerial trips made by Imran Khan =

The following is a list of international prime ministerial trips made by Imran Khan during his term as the Prime Minister of Pakistan from 2018 to 2022.

During his tenure, his international trips were seven times cheaper than that of former President of Pakistan Asif Ali Zardari and former Prime Minister of Pakistan Nawaz Sharif.

In January 2022, the total cost of Khans foreign trips since his 3 year tenure were Rs. 30 million (equivalent to Rs. 150 million or US$550,000 in 2021). The amount pales in comparison to Zardari's single visit to New York City in 2012 which cost $1.1 million and the $901,250 spent on Nawaz's single visit to the same city in 2016.

== Summary of international trips ==
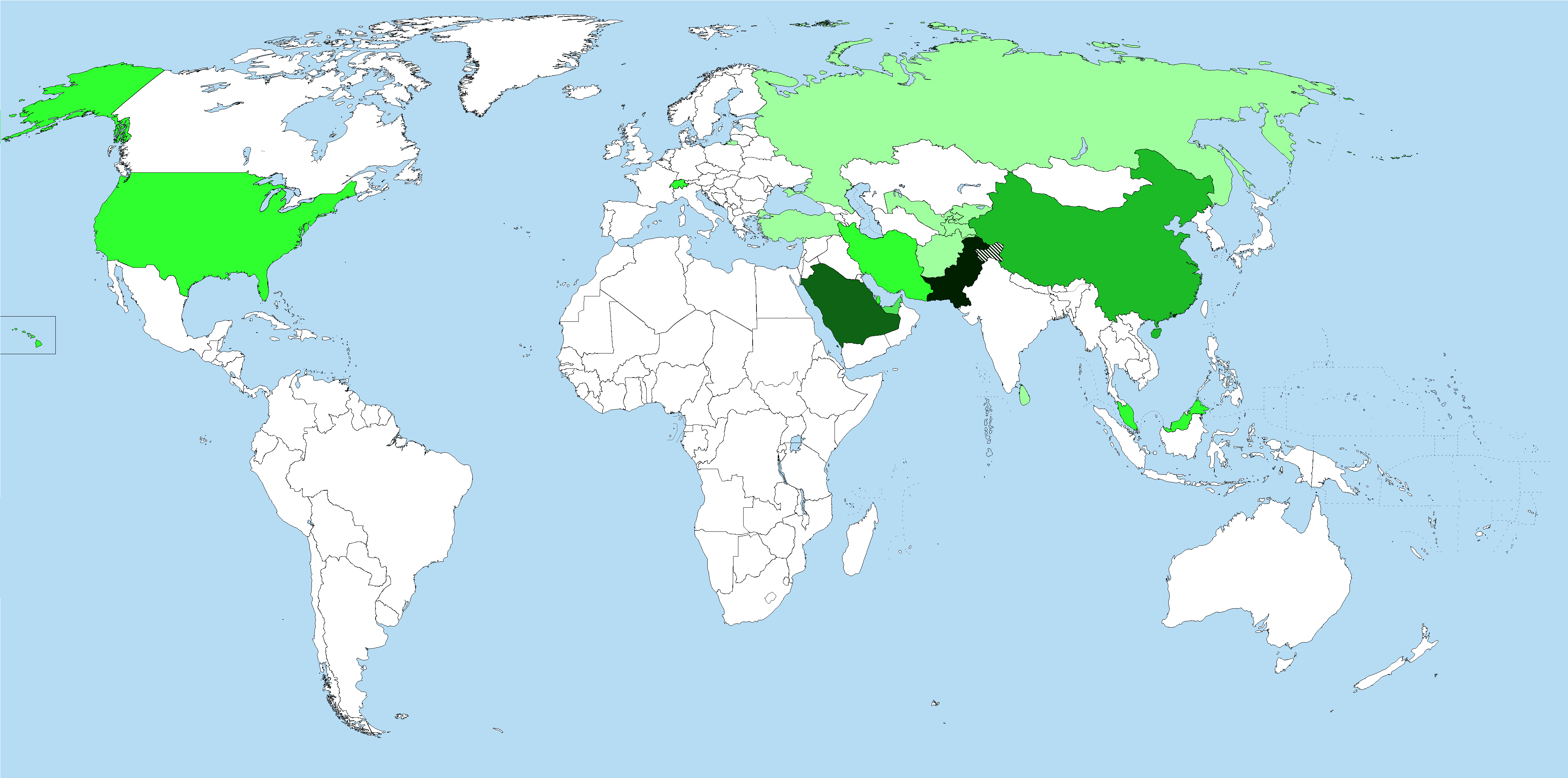
Map of international trips made by Imran Khan as Prime Minister

One visit
Two visits
Three visits
Four visits
Eight visits
Pakistan

As of April 2022, Imran Khan had made 34 foreign trips to 16 countries during his Prime Ministership from 18 August 2018 to 10 April 2022.

Prime Minister Imran Khan's visits by country
Number of visits	Country
1 visit (8)	Afghanistan, Bahrain, Kyrgyzstan, Turkey, Sri Lanka, Uzbekistan, Tajikistan, Russia
2 visits (5)	Iran, Malaysia, Qatar, Switzerland, United States
3 visits (1)	United Arab Emirates
4 visits (1)	China
8 visits (1)	Saudi Arabia

=== 2018 ===
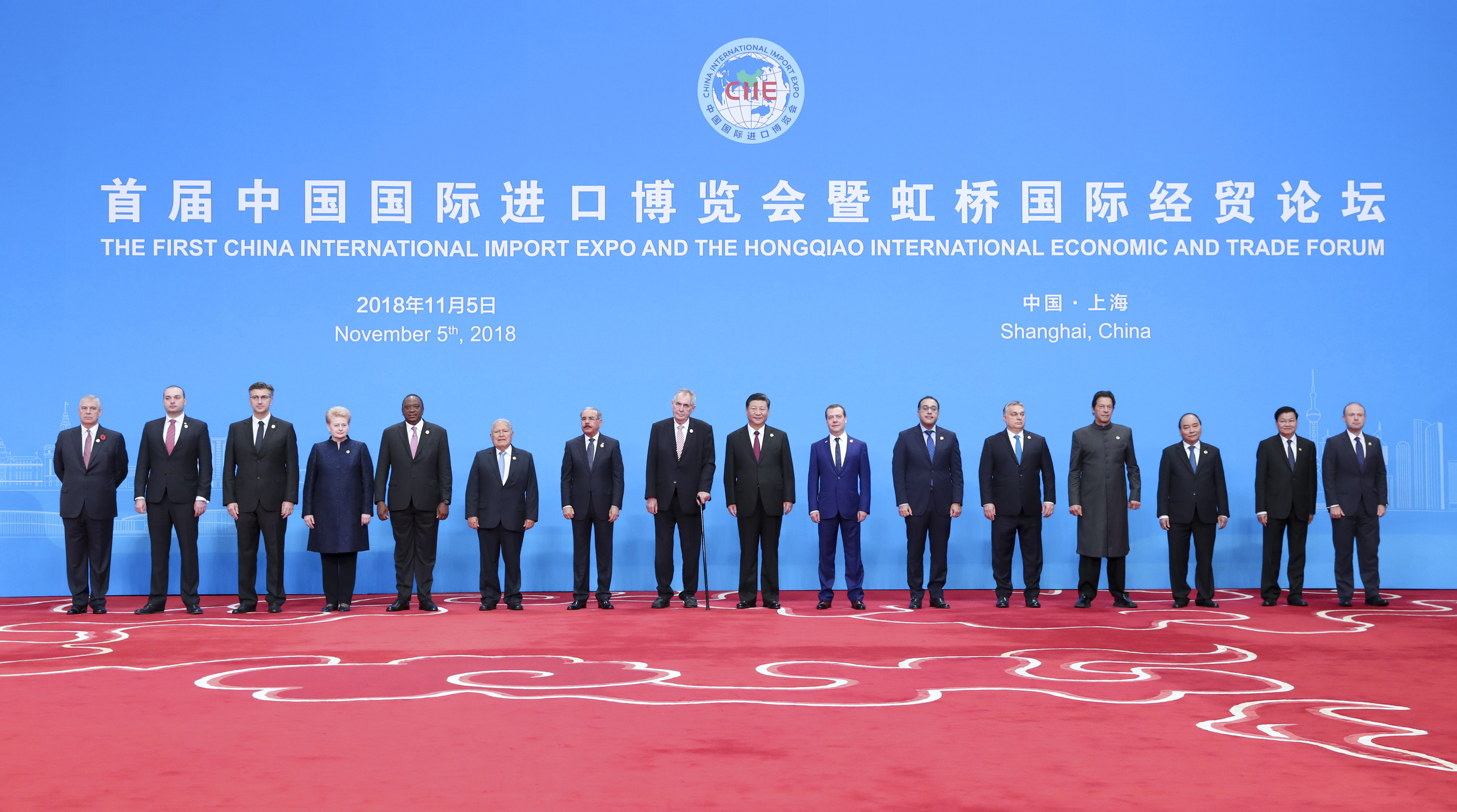
Khan at the first China International Import Expo in November 2018.

Imran Khan was received by Malaysian Prime Minister Mahathir Mohamad in November 2018.

Country	Area visited	Date (s)	Purpose (s)	Details	Ref
Saudi Arabia	Madina, Makkah, Jeddah	18–19 September 2018	State visit	See also: Pakistan–Saudi Arabia relations Inaugural two-day visit to meet King Salman of Saudi Arabia in Jeddah, to discuss matters of regional and bilateral interest. Khan also performed the Umrah in Mecca and visited the Prophet's Mosque in Medina.	
United Arab Emirates	Abu Dhabi	19 September 2018	State visit	See also: Pakistan–United Arab Emirates relations Khan met with Crown Prince of Abu Dhabi Mohammed bin Zayed in Abu Dhabi, holding talks on regional and international issues of mutual interest as well as ways to enhance Pakistan-UAE relations.	
Saudi Arabia	Madina, Riyadh	23–24 October 2018	State visit	See also: Pakistan–Saudi Arabia relations	
China	Shanghai, Beijing	2–5 November 2018	State visit	See also: China–Pakistan relations Also to attend the inaugural China International Import Expo in Shanghai as Guest of Honor, with an anticipated keynote speech.	
United Arab Emirates	Abu Dhabi Dubai	18 November 2018	State visit	See also: Pakistan–United Arab Emirates relations	
Malaysia	Kuala Lumpur	20–21 November 2018	State visit	See also: Malaysia–Pakistan relations	

=== 2019 ===
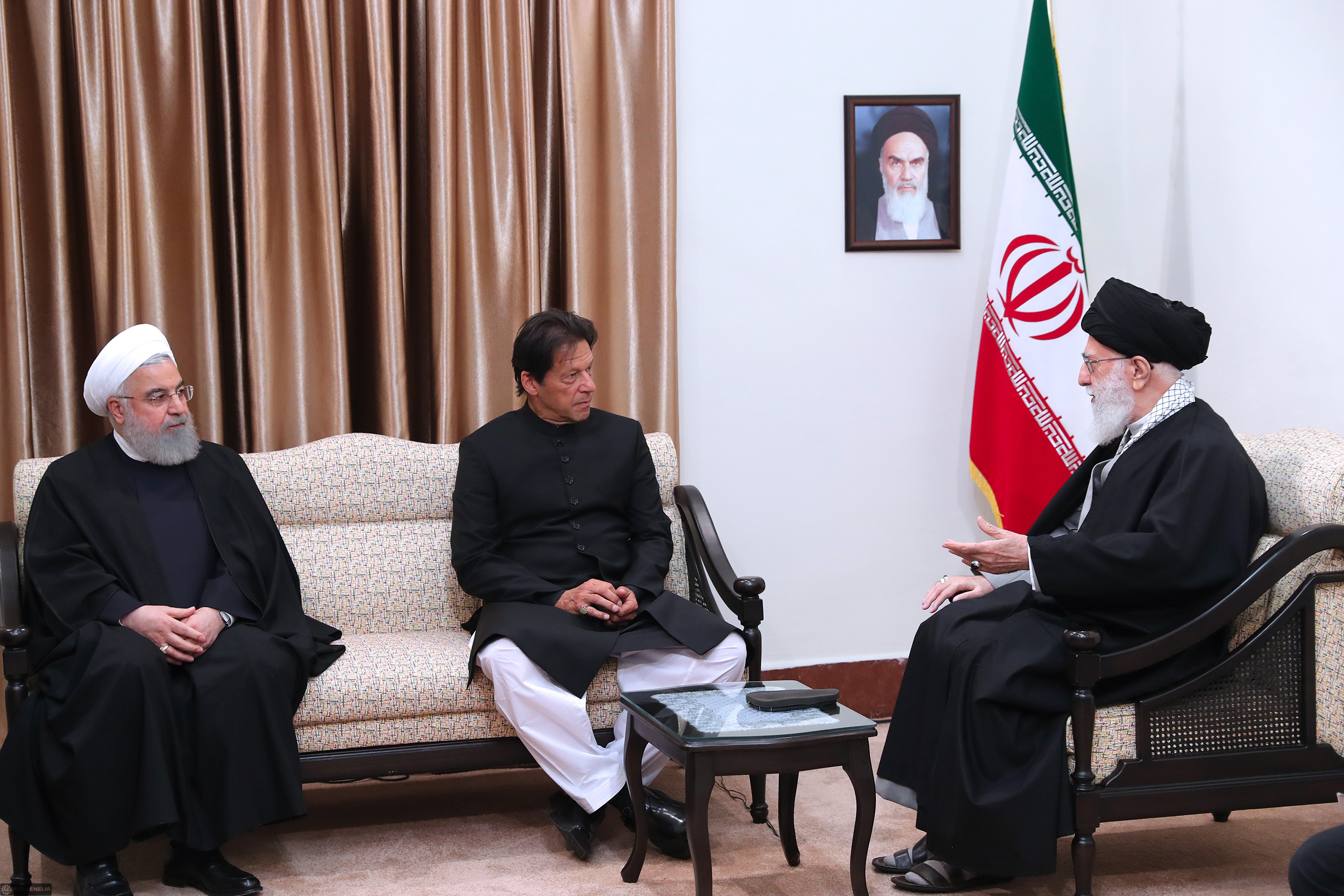
Khan with Ali Khamenei and Hassan Rouhani in April 2019

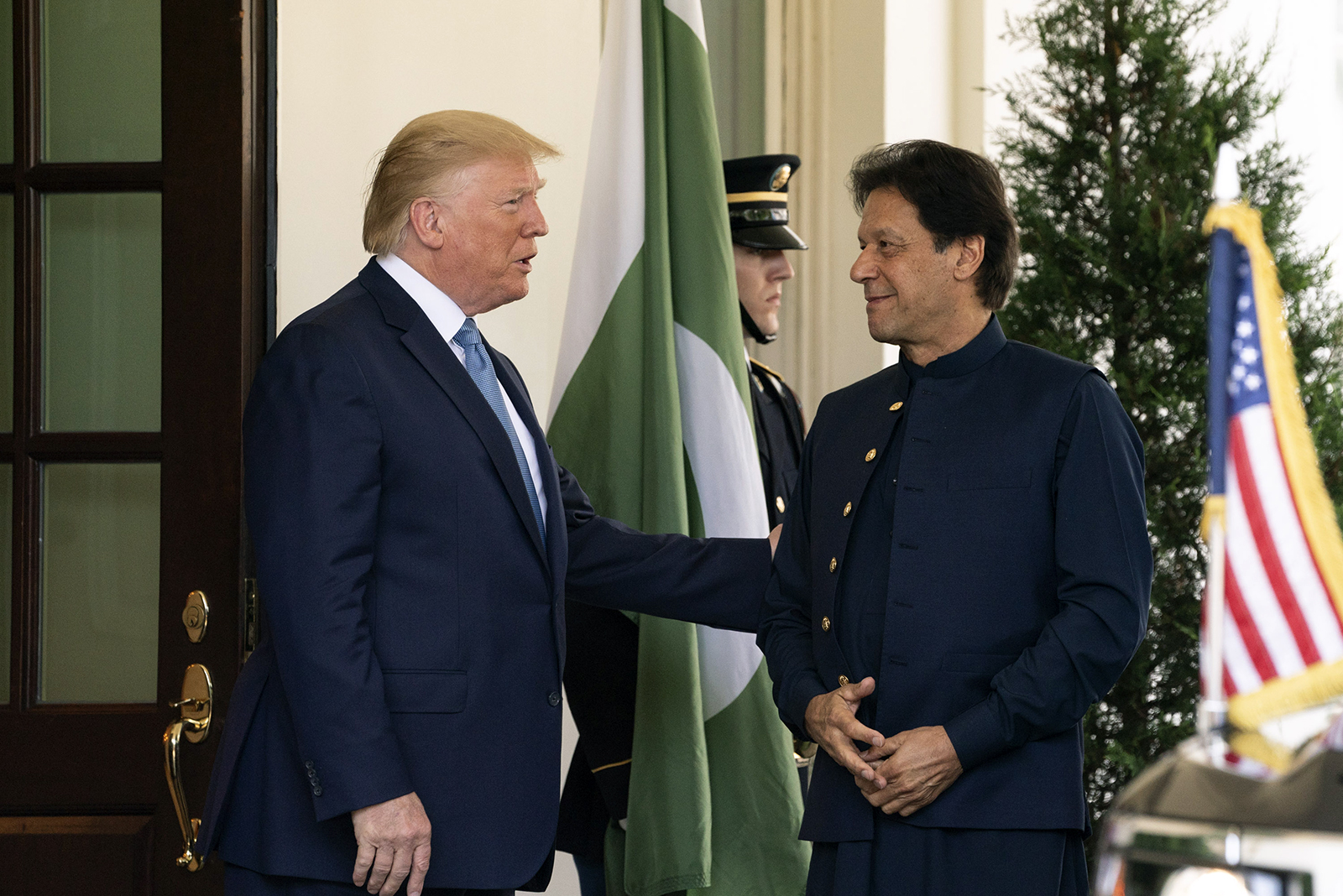
Khan at the White House in July 2019

Country	Area visited	Date (s)	Purpose (s)	Details	Ref
Turkey	Ankara, Konya	3–4 January	State visit	See also: Pakistan–Turkey relations Met with President Recep Tayyip Erdoğan.Also visited the shrine of Jalāl ad-Dīn Muhammad Rūmī in Konya.	
Qatar	Doha	21–22 January	State visit	See also: Pakistan–Qatar relations	
United Arab Emirates	Dubai	10–11 February	Official visit	See also: Pakistan–United Arab Emirates relations	
Iran	Tehran, Mashad	21–22 April	Official visit	See also: Iran–Pakistan relations Met with President Hassan Rouhani and Supreme Leader of Iran Ali Khamenei.	
China	Beijing	25–28 April	Official visit	See also: China–Pakistan relations Khan attended second Belt and Road forum 2019.Khan met with Xi Jinping and Premier Li Keqiang.	
Saudi Arabia	Mecca and Medina	30 May–1 June	14th OIC summit	See also: Pakistan–Saudi Arabia relations See also: Pakistan and the Organisation of Islamic Cooperation Arrived for a three-day visit with a high-profile delegation to attend the 14th summit of the Organisation of Islamic Cooperation (OIC). He visited the Prophet's Mosque in Medina to offer prayers, and performed Umrah at the Kaaba with his wife in Mecca the following day. On the sidelines of the summit, he met King Salman and Crown Prince Mohammed bin Salman of Saudi Arabia, and also held talks with Egyptian president Abdel Fattah al-Sisi and Afghan president Ashraf Ghani. At the summit, he addressed the issue of blasphemy, the importance of de-linking terrorism from Islam and Muslim-led political movements, the progress of science and technology in Muslim nations, as well as regional issues affecting South Asia and the Middle East. Khan called on all OIC leaders to stand against acts of oppression throughout the world.	
Kyrgyzstan	Bishkek	14–15 June	2019 SCO summit	See also: Kyrgyzstan–Pakistan relations Participated in the 2019 summit of the Shanghai Cooperation Organisation.	
United States	Washington DC	21–23 July	Working Visit	See also: Pakistan–United States relations Met with U.S. president Donald Trump, which was focused on refreshing bilateral ties between Pakistan and the United States. Before the bilateral meeting, the United States declared Balochistan Liberation Army (BLA) as a terrorist organization. Khan addressed a packed crowd of 30,000 Pakistani-Americans at Capital One Arena in Washington, D.C., in a speech. Khan has previously arrived to the U.S on Concorde whilst it was sponsored by Pepsi.	
Saudi Arabia	Jeddah, Mecca, Medina	18–20 September	State visit	See also: Pakistan–Saudi Arabia relations Met with Saudi officials, Crown Prince Mohammad bin Salman and King Salman of Saudi Arabia. He also performed Umrah at the Kaaba in Mecca. Khan also visited the Prophet Mosque in Medina	
United Nations	New York City	21-27 September	Official visit	See also: Pakistan and the United Nations Attended the Seventy-fourth session of the United Nations General Assembly and the 2019 UN Climate Action Summit. Prior to that, Khan also attended and spoke at a high-level side events co-hosted by Pakistan and Turkey on countering hate speech and on environmental protection and poverty alleviation, co-hosted by Malaysia and Pakistan. A trilateral summit meeting of Pakistan, Malaysia and Turkey was held on the General Assembly sidelines. He met with US President Donald Trump, UK Prime Minister Boris Johnson, Italian Prime Minister Giuseppe Conte, Chinese Foreign Minister Wang Yi, Iranian President Hassan Rouhani, Russian Foreign Minister Sergey Lavrov, New Zealand Prime Minister Jacinda Ardern, Egyptian President Abdel Fattah el-Sisi, Swiss President Ueli Maurer, Indonesian Vice President Jusuf Kalla, Ethiopian President Sahle-Work Zewde, Turkish President Recep Tayyip Erdoğan, Malaysian Prime Minister Mahathir Mohamad, founder of the Kashmir Study Group Farooq Kathwari, President of the Council on Foreign Relations Richard N. Haass, President of the International Committee of the Red Cross Peter Maurer, President of the World Bank Group David Malpass, Secretary General of Amnesty International Kumi Naidoo, CEO of Uber Dara Khosrowshahi and Microsoft technical adviser Bill Gates. Prime Minister Khan attended receptions hosted by President Trump, First Lady Melania Trump and UN Secretary General António Guterres.	
China	Beijing	8-9 October	Official visit	See also: China–Pakistan relations Held talks with Chinese President Xi Jinping, and discussed issues of regional and bilateral significance. Also met Chinese Premier Li Keqiang.	
Iran	Tehran	13 October	State visit	See also: Iran-Pakistan relations Visited with the aim to promote peace and security in the region. Met with President Hassan Rouhani and Supreme Leader of Iran Ali Khamenei.	
Saudi Arabia	Riyadh, Medina	15 October	State visit	See also: Pakistan–Saudi Arabia relations Visited with the aim to promote peace and security in the region. Met with crown prince Mohammad bin Salman and King Salman of Saudi Arabia. Khan also visited the Prophet Mosque in Medina.	
Saudi Arabia	Riyadh, Medina	14 December	Official visit	See also: Pakistan–Saudi Arabia relations Khan paid respects at the Prophet grave and offered prayers at Al-Masjid an-Nabawi. Met with Crown Prince Mohammad bin Salman. PM visit is a part of regular exchanges between the leadership of the two nations. The consultations covered bilateral matters and recent developments in the regional context	
Bahrain	Manama	16 December	State visit	See also: Bahrain–Pakistan relations Khan conferred with Bahrain highest civil award also participated in Bahrain national day ceremony as Chief Guest. Met with King Hamad bin Isa Al Khalifa and Salman, Crown Prince of Bahrain.	
Switzerland	Geneva	17 December	Official visit	See also: Pakistan–Switzerland relations Participated in the first International conference on refugees. Khan articulated Pakistan's perspective, experience and contribution to the Afghan refugees. Also met with Turkish President Recep Tayyip Erdoğan on the side line.	

=== 2020 ===
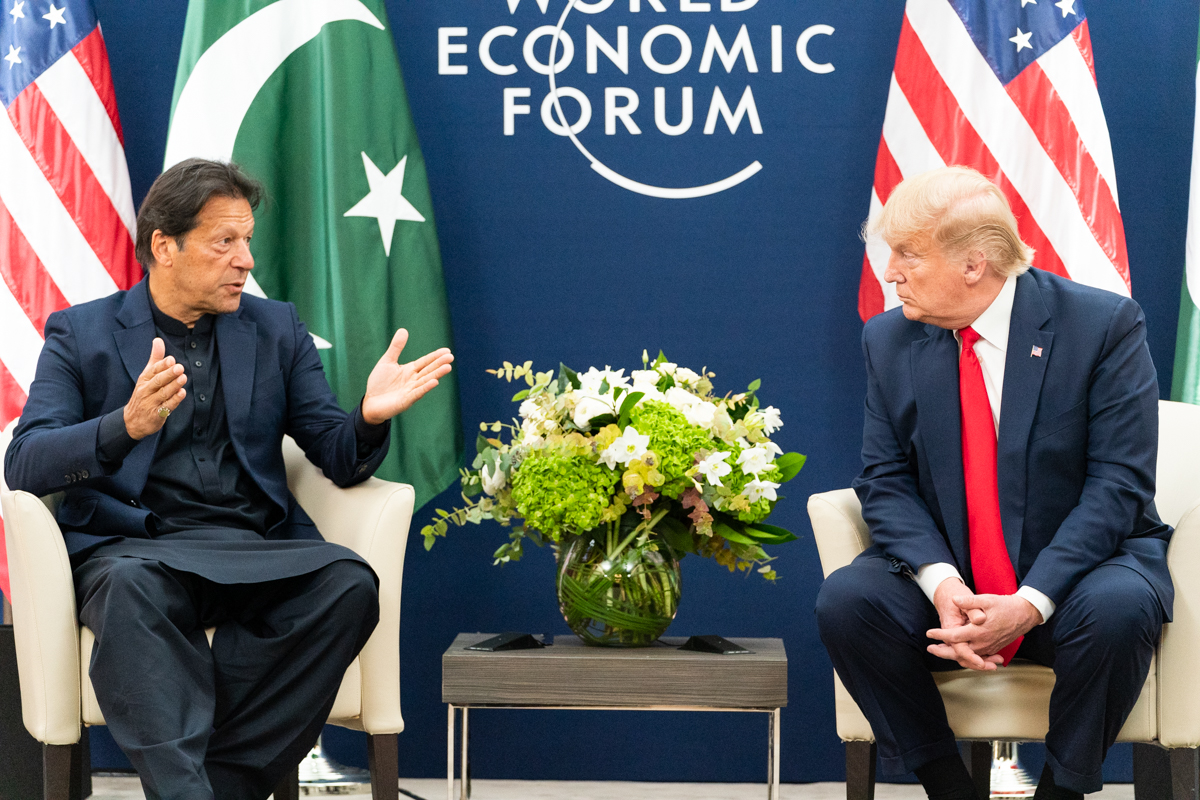
Donald J. Trump meets with the Prime Minister of the Islamic Republic of Pakistan Imran Khan on Tuesday, Jan. 21, 2020

Country	Area visited	Date (s)	Purpose (s)	Details	Ref
Switzerland	Davos	21-23 January	Official visit	See also: Pakistan–Switzerland relations Attended the 50th World Economic Forum Met with US President Donald Trump on the side line of the forum.	
Malaysia	Kuala Lumpur	3-5 February	Official visit	See also: Malaysia-Pakistan relations One to one meeting with Malaysian Prime Minister Mahathir Mohamad followed by the delegation level meeting.	
Qatar	Doha	27 February	Official visit	See also: Pakistan-Qatar relations	
Afghanistan	Kabul	19 November	Official visit	See also: Pakistan-Afghanistan relations	

=== 2021 ===
Country	Area visited	Date (s)	Purpose (s)	Details	Ref
Sri Lanka	Colombo	23-24 February	State visit	See also: Pakistan-Sri Lanka relations	
Saudi Arabia	Madina, Makkah, Jeddah	07–9 May	State visit	See also: Pakistan–Saudi Arabia relations	
Uzbekistan	Tashkent	15-16 July	Official visit	See also: Pakistan-Uzbekistan relations	
Tajikistan	Dushanbe	16-18 September	Official visit	See also: Pakistan-Tajikistan relations	
Saudi Arabia	Madina, Makkah, Jeddah	23–25 October	Official visit	See also: Pakistan–Saudi Arabia relations	

=== 2022 ===
Country	Area Visited	Dates (s)	Purpose (s)	Details	Ref
China	Beijing	4-8 February	Official visit	See also: China-Pakistan relations	
Russia	Moscow	23-25 February	Official visit	See also: Russia–Pakistan relations During the summit, the PM and Vladimir Putin reviewed the entire array of bilateral relations, including energy cooperation. They also have discussed wide-ranging exchange of views on major regional and international issues, including Islamophobia and the situation in Afghanistan.	
