= Nawaz Sharif government =

Nawaz Sharif government or Nawaz Sharif ministry may refer to:

== Pakistan federal government ==
- First Nawaz Sharif government, 1990–1993
- Second Nawaz Sharif government, 1997–1999
- Third Nawaz Sharif government, 2013–2017

== Punjab provincial government ==
- First Nawaz Sharif provincial government, 1985–1988
- Second Nawaz Sharif provincial government, 1988–1990

== See also ==
- Nawaz Sharif
- Shehbaz Sharif government (disambiguation)
