= Shehbaz Sharif government =

Shehbaz Sharif government or Shehbaz Sharif ministry may refer to:

== Pakistan federal government ==
- First Shehbaz Sharif government, 2022–2023
- Second Shehbaz Sharif government, 2024-Present

== Punjab provincial government ==
- Chief ministership of Shehbaz Sharif
  - First Shehbaz Sharif provincial government, 1997–1999
  - Second Shehbaz Sharif provincial government, 2008–2013
  - Third Shehbaz Sharif provincial government, 2013–2018

== See also ==
- Shehbaz Sharif
- Nawaz Sharif government (disambiguation)
