= List of international prime ministerial trips made by Shehbaz Sharif =

The following is a list of international prime ministerial trips made by Shehbaz Sharif during his first term as the Prime Minister of Pakistan from April 2022 to August 2023 and his second term from March 2024 to present.

A total of Rs. 1.3 billion (US$4.7 million) had been spent on Prime Minister Shehbaz Sharif and his accompanying delegations’ foreign trips in the nine months of FY22-FY23.

== First prime ministerial term ==
In his first term in office, Sharif made 24 foreign trips to 14 countries from 10 April, 2022, to 14 August, 2023.

The number of visits per country where Prime Minister Sharif travelled are:

- One visit to Azerbaijan, China, Egypt, France, Iran, Kazakhstan, Switzerland, UK, USA, Uzbekistan
- Two visits to Qatar, Saudi Arabia
- Four visits to Turkey, UAE

== 2022 ==
Country	Area Visited	Dates (s)	Purpose (s)	Details	Ref
Saudi Arabia	Madina, Makkah, Jeddah	28–30 April	Official Visit	See also: Saudi Arabia-Pakistan relations	
UAE	Abu Dhabi	30 April	Official Visit	See also: Pakistan–United Arab Emirates relations	
United Kingdom	London	11–15 May	Private visit	Met his brother, former prime minister Nawaz Sharif who is also the supreme leader of the Pakistan Muslim League (N), to discuss party and governance matters.	
UAE	Abu Dhabi	15 May	Official visit	See also: Pakistan–United Arab Emirates relations Made a stopover trip in Abu Dhabi on his way back home from London to officially condole the death of UAE's president, Khalifa bin Zayed Al Nahyan.	
Turkey	Ankara	31 May – 2 June	Official visit	See also: Pakistan–Turkey relations Meeting with Turkish president Recep Tayyip Erdogan to renew bilateral relations. A Pak-Turk Business Council meeting was also organised for businessmen and traders.	
Qatar	Doha	23–24 August	Official visit	See also: Pakistan–Qatar relations	
Uzbekistan	Samarkand	15–16 September	Working visit	Sharif met Uzbek President Shavkat Mirziyoyev, Russian President Vladimir Putin, Iran’s Ebrahim Raisi and Tajik President Emomali Rahmon on the sidelines of the Shanghai Cooperation Organisation summit.	
United Kingdom	London	17–18 September	Working visit	See also: Pakistan–United Kingdom relations Sharif attended the funeral of Britain's late monarch Queen Elizabeth II and met British PM Liz Truss along with the King of United Kingdom Charles III.	
United States United Nations	New York City	19–24 September	Working visit	See also: Pakistan and the United Nations Sharif met with French President Emmanuel Macron, Austria's Federal Chancellor Karl Nehammer, Iranian President Ebrahim Raisi, and Spanish President Pedro Sánchez on the sidelines of the 77th session of the United Nations General Assembly.	
Kazakhstan	Astana	12–13 October	Working visit	Sharif attended Conference on Interaction and Confidence-Building Measures in Asia summit.	
Saudi Arabia	Riyadh	24–25 October	Official visit	Shehbaz attended the Future Investment Initiative summit.	
China	Beijing	1–2 November	Official visit	See also: China-Pakistan relations Sharif met with China's President Xi Jinping, continues progress on CPEC.	
Egypt	Sharm-el-Sheikh	7–8 November	Working visit	Sharif joined Egyptian President and Norwegian Prime Minister to co-host the COP27.	
United Kingdom	London	9–13 November	Private visit	Met his brother, former prime minister Nawaz Sharif who is also the supreme leader of the Pakistan Muslim League (N), to discuss party and governance matters.	
Turkey	Ankara Istanbul	25–26 November	Official visit	See also: Pakistan–Turkey relations Meeting with Turkish president Recep Tayyip Erdogan to renew bilateral relations. A Pak-Turk Business Council meeting is also organised for businessmen and traders.	

== 2023 ==
Country	Area Visited	Dates (s)	Purpose (s)	Details	Ref
Switzerland	Geneva	8–10 January	Official visit	Sharif and António Guterres, the Secretary-General of the United Nations co-hosted 2023 International Conference on Climate Resilient Pakistan.	
United Arab Emirates	Abu Dhabi	12–13 January	Official visit	PM to meet UAE President with focus on advancing economic, trade and investment ties.	
Turkey	Ankara Adiyaman	16–18 February	Official visit	See also: Pakistan–Turkey relations Met with Turkish president Recep Tayyip Erdogan and visited Turkish earthquake-hit areas and victims.	
Qatar	Doha	5-6 March	Official visit	See also: Pakistan–Qatar relations To join 5th International United Nations World Conference of Developing Countries hosted by Emir of Qatar. To have an opportunity to hold a meeting session with the Pakistani diaspora. To meet with Emir of Qatar Tamim bin Hamad Al Thani at the Amiri Diwan. Exchanged views on international issues of mutual interest, paving the way for economic collaboration as well as post-flood recovery efforts in Pakistan with the donations of Qatar.	
United Kingdom	London	3-7 May	Working visit	See also: Pakistan–United Kingdom relations Sharif attended the coronation ceremony of the King of United Kingdom Charles III and also met British PM Rishi Sunak.	
Iran	Mand-Pishin marketplace, Iranian side of Pakistan-Iran border	18 May	Official visit	See also: Iran–Pakistan relations Met with President Ebrahim Raisi and inaugurated Electricity Supply Project from Iran to Gawadar.	
Turkey	Ankara, Istanbul	3–4 June	Official visit	See also: Pakistan–Turkey relations Attended the inauguration of Turkish President Recep Tayyip Erdogan and meetings with Pak-Turk Business Council besides Pakistani Diaspora in Turkey.	
Azerbaijan	Baku	14–15 June	Official visit	See also: Pakistan–Azerbaijan relations Meetings with President Ilham Aliyev and Prime Minister Ali Asadov.	
France	Paris	21–22 June	Working visit	See also: Pakistan–France relations Meetings with President Emmanuel Macron and other French officials. Attended the Summit for a New Global Financial Pact.	
United Arab Emirates	Abu Dhabi	28 July	Official visit	PM to meet UAE President Sheikh Mohammed Bin Zayed Al Nahyan for the condolence on death of his brother Sheikh Saeed bin Zayed Al Nahyan	

== Second prime ministerial term ==
During the second term in office, Shehbaz Sharif made 44 foreign trips to 22 countries since 4 March, 2024.

The number of visits per country where Prime Minister Sharif travelled are:

- One visit to Austria, Bahrain, Belarus, Kazakhstan, Russia, Bangladesh, Malaysia, Turkmenistan, UK, Uzbekistan, Kyrgyzstan
- Two visits to China, Egypt, Iran, Tajikistan, Turkey, Switzerland
- Three visits to UAE, USA
- Five visits to Azerbaijan, Qatar
- Ten visits to Saudi Arabia

== 2024 ==
Country	Area Visited	Dates (s)	Details	Ref
Saudi Arabia	Madina, Makkah, Jeddah	6–8 April	See also: Saudi Arabia-Pakistan relations Shehbaz met Crown Prince Mohammed bin Salman and also performed Umrah.	
Saudi Arabia	Riyadh	27–29 April	Sharif visited Riyadh to attend the World Economic Forum Special Meeting on Global Collaboration, Growth and Energy held from 28-29 April 2024. During his visit, Shehbaz met Crown Prince Mohammed bin Salman.	
Iran	Tehran	22 May	Shehbaz attended the memorial ceremony of the late Iranian president Ebrahim Raisi and met Iran’s supreme leader Ayatollah Ali Khamenei.	
United Arab Emirates	Abu Dhabi	23 May	Shehbaz met with the UAE President Mohamed bin Zayed Al Nahyan.	
China	Shenzhen, Beijing, Xi'an	4–8 June	See also: China–Pakistan relations Sharif met with Chinese Premier Li Qiang and China's President Xi Jinping in Beijing. Sharif also visited the historical Terracotta Army in Xi'an.	
Tajikistan	Dushanbe	2–3 July	Sharif met Tajik Prime Minister Kokhir Rasulzoda and President Emomali Rahmon while also visiting the Samanid Mausoleum.	
Kazakhstan	Astana	3—4 July	Sharif met with Russian President Vladimir Putin on the sidelines of the Shanghai Cooperation Organisation (SCO) summit and SCO Plus summit.	
United Kingdom	London	21—23 September		
United States United Nations	New York City	24—28 September	See also: Pakistan and the United Nations Sharif met with U.S. President Joe Biden, UK Prime Minister Keir Starmer, Turkish President Recep Tayyip Erdogan, Austria's Federal Chancellor Karl Nehammer, Iranian President Masoud Pezeshkian, Iraqi Prime Minister Mohammed Shia' Al Sudani, Nepali Prime Minister K.P. Sharma Oli, Bangladesh Chief Advisor Muhammad Yunus, Palestine President Mahmoud Abbas and Spanish Prime Minister Pedro Sánchez on the sidelines of the 79th session of the United Nations General Assembly.	
Saudi Arabia	Riyadh	29—30 October	Sharif attended the 8th edition of the two-day Future Investment Initiative and held a meeting with Saudi Crown Prince Mohammed bin Salman.	
Qatar	Doha	31 October — 1 November	Sharif met Qatari Prime Minister Mohammed bin Abdulrahman bin Jassim Al Thani.	
Saudi Arabia	Riyadh	10—11 November	Sharif attended the Second Joint Arab—Islamic Summit and held a meeting with the Saudi Minister for Investment Khalid A. Al-Falih.	
Azerbaijan	Baku	12—13 November	Sharif attended the COP29 summit. He held meetings with President Ilham Aliyev and Prime Minister Ali Asadov.	
Saudi Arabia	Riyadh	3–4 December	Shehbaz attended the 'One Water Summit'. He held meetings with Saudi Crown Prince Mohammed bin Salman and French President Emmanuel Macron.	
Egypt	Cairo	18–20 December	Sharif participated in the 11th D-8 Summit. He held meetings with Chief Advisor of Bangladesh Muhammad Yunus, Indonesian President Prabowo Subianto and Egyptian President Abdel Fattah el-Sisi.	

== 2025 ==
Country	Area visited	Dates (s)	Details	Ref
United Arab Emirates	Abu Dhabi, Dubai	10–11 February	Sharif was on a working visit to the UAE to participate in the World Governments Summit 2025. PM Sharif met with President Sheikh Mohamed bin Zayed Al Nahyan and IMF's MD, Kristalina Georgieva, and also had meetings with the leaders of Sri Lanka, Bosnia and Herzegovina, and the State of Kuwait.	
Azerbaijan	Baku	24–25 February	Met with President Ilham Aliyev, signed multiple MoUs. The two sides finalised the matters for Baku's $2 billion investment in Pakistan.	
Uzbekistan	Tashkent	25–26 February	PM Shehbaz met with Uzbekistan President Shavkat Mirziyoyev. They discussed "all areas of bilateral cooperation including connectivity, economic, trade, investment, energy, defence and security, regional stability, and education".	
Saudi Arabia	Medina, Mecca, Jeddah	19–22 March	Shehbaz met Crown Prince Mohammed bin Salman, discussed bilateral ties. Also performed Umrah.	
Belarus	Minsk	10–11 April	Shehbaz met President Alexander Lukashenko. PML-N Supremo Nawaz Sharif and Maryam Nawaz also accompanied him. Prime Minister Shehbaz Sharif and Belarusian President Aleksandr Lukashenko held a bilateral meeting in Minsk on Friday. They agreed to enhance cooperation in food security, agriculture, manufacturing of electric vehicles, buses and farm machinery.	
Turkey	Ankara	22–23 April	Meeting with Turkish president Recep Tayyip Erdogan to renew bilateral relations. A Pak-Turk Business Council meeting was also organised for businessmen and traders.	
Turkey	Istanbul	25–26 May	Prime Minister Shehbaz Sharif visited Turkey to thank President Erdoğan for support during tensions with India. They discussed defense, intelligence sharing, trade (targeting $5 billion), and regional stability.	
Iran	Tehran	26-27 May	Met with President Masoud Pezeshkian to strengthen ties in trade, energy, border security, and regional connectivity. Both sides pledged to promote peace in South Asia and deepen regional cooperation.	
Azerbaijan	Baku	27-28 May	Shehbaz Sharif visited Azerbaijan to express gratitude for its $2 billion investment pledge in Pakistan. He met with President Ilham Aliyev, thanks to the Azerbaijan for the support during the Conflict with India in May 2025.	
Tajikistan	Dushanbe	29-30 May	Met with President Emomali Rahmon to discuss trade, energy, regional connectivity, and security. Sharif also attended the International Conference on Glaciers' Preservation. He also thanks to the Tajiks for their support during the conflict with India in May 2025.	
Saudi Arabia	Medina, Mecca, Jeddah	5-6 June	Shehbaz met Crown Prince Mohammed bin Salman and also performed Umrah.	
United Arab Emirates	Abu Dhabi	12 June	Shehbaz met with the UAE President Mohamed bin Zayed Al Nahyan.	
Azerbaijan	Khankendi	3-4 July	Shehbaz Sharif visited Azerbaijan to attend 17th ECO Summit. Also met President of Azerbaijan Ilham Aliyev, President of Iran Masoud Pezeshkian, President of Turkey, Recep Tayyip Erdoğan.	
China	Tianjin, Beijing	August 30 - September 4	Attended 2025 Tianjin SCO summit and 2025 China Victory Day Parade. The Prime Minister held bilateral meetings with the Chinese President Xi Jinping and Premier Li Qiang, the Presidents of Russia, Iran, Turkey, Azerbaijan and Tajikistan. He also had informal meetings with the PMs of Malaysia, the President of Maldives, and the United Nations Secretary-General.	
Qatar	Doha	11 September	Prime Minister Shehbaz Sharif visited Qatar on a one-day fraternal visit to express his solidarity with the State of Qatar after the heinous and barbaric attacks by Israel on Doha earlier this week. Met with the Emir of the State of Qatar, Emir Tamim bin Hamad bin Khalifa Al Thani and other senior Qatari leaders.	
Qatar	Doha	14-15 September	Prime Minister Shehbaz Sharif will visit Qatar to attend the emergency Arab-Islamic Summit over the heinous Israeli strikes on Doha earlier this week. Sharif held informal and formal meetings with the leaders and summit representatives of Turkiye, Iran, Jordan, Egypt, Qatar, Saudi Arabia, Malaysia, the Palestinian Authority.	
Saudi Arabia	Riyadh	17-18 September	Sharif signed a Strategic Mutual Defense Agreement with MBS. They reaffirmed historic ties and exchanged warm wishes for each other's countries.	
United Kingdom	London	18-22 September	Sharif addressed the overseas Pakistani diaspora in London. Met with British business officials.	
USA	New York, Washington DC	22-26 September	Sharif attended the 80th session of the United Nations General Assembly, where he addressed the assembly on behalf of his nation on the 26th September covering climate change, the ongoing genocide in Gaza and Israel's aggression, and also the latest May tensions with India. Sharif held corridor talks with the Chancellor of Austria Christian Stocker and Federal Chancellor Karl Nehammer, Crown Prince of Kuwait Sheikh Sabah Khaled Al-Hamad Al-Mubarak, Chief Adviser of Bangladesh Dr. Muhammad Yunus, Sri Lankan President Anura Kumara Dissanayake, Emir of Qatar Sheikh Tamim bin Hamad bin Khalifa Al Thani, Jordanian King Abdullah II, Indonesian President Prabowo Subianto, US President Donald Trump, Chinese Premier Li Qiang, IMF Chief Kristalina Georgieva, World Bank Group President Ajay Banga, and UN Chief Antonio Guterres, and more. Meanwhile, the FM met with seniors from Germany, Costa Rica, Belgium, Bahrain, UK, Slovenia, Lithuania, Hungary, and more. Sharif also attended a climate summit and travelled to Washington DC to meet with US President Donald Trump, Vice President JD Vance, and Secretary of State Marco Rubio at the White House.	
Malaysia	Kuala Lumpur	5-7 October	Sharif embarked on a two-day official visit to Malaysia and met with Malaysian President Anwar Ibrahim and key seniors. Agreed upon strengthening bilateral relations and cooperation in various industries such as halal meat, rice, and more.	
Egypt	Sharm-el-Sheikh	13 October	2025 Gaza peace summit Attended the Gaza Peace Summit upon invitation of President of Egypt and the USA. Met with US President Donald Trump, and Egyptian President Abdel Fatteh El- Sisi and the King of Jordan. Held informal meeting with President of Azerbaijan and PM of Armenia.	
Saudi Arabia	Riyadh	29 October	Attend the ninth Future Investment Initiative (FII) Forum, the annual investment gathering often dubbed "Davos in the Desert".	
Azerbaijan	Baku	7-8 November	PM Shehbaz Sharif met with Azerbaijan's President Ilham Aliyev	
Bahrain	Manama	26-27 November	PM Shehbaz met with Bahraini King Hamad bin Isa Al Khalifa and had meetings with the leadership to boost cooperation between Bahrain and Pakistan.	
Turkmenistan	Ashgabat	11-12 December	PM Shehbaz attended an international forum, and meet with the President of Turkmenistan.	

== 2026 ==
Country	Area visited	Dates (s)	Details	Ref
Switzerland	Davos	20-22 January	PM Shehbaz attended World Economic Forum meeting in Davos, and signed a charter or agreement to formally establish US President Trump's Board of Peace.	
Austria	Vienna	15-16 February	PM Shehbaz lands in Vienna on official visit. He meets with Austrian Chancellor Christian Stocker. It's the first visit by a Pakistani PM to Austria since 1992.	
USA	Washington DC	18-20 February	PM Shehbaz lands in Washington DC upon the invitation of US President Donald Trump. He will be attending the inaugural summit of the Board of Peace	
Qatar	Doha	23-24 February	PM Shehbaz lands in Qatar, and meets with Qatari business leaders and Qatari Emir Sheikh Tamim bin Hamad Al Thani	
Saudi Arabia	Jeddah	12 March	Met with Crown Prince Mohammed bin Salman	
Saudi Arabia	Jeddah	15-16 April	Met with Crown Prince Mohammed bin Salman and discussed Middle East Crisis.	
Qatar	Doha	16-17 April	PM Shehbaz lands in Qatar, and meets with Qatari Emir Sheikh Tamim bin Hamad Al Thani and discussed Middle East Crisis.	
Turkey	Ankara	17–18 April	Meeting with Turkish president Recep Tayyip Erdogan. Also attended 5th Antalya Diplomacy Forum.	
China	Tianjin, Beijing	May 22 - May 26	The Prime Minister held bilateral meetings with the Chinese President Xi Jinping and Premier Li Qiang. He also joined events marking the 75th anniversary of Pakistan–China diplomatic relations. PM Shehbaz gave an address during a special ceremony attended by senior Chinese leadership, including Vice President Han Zheng, members of the Pakistani delegation, and other dignitaries. The prime minister highlighted the historic depth and resilience of bilateral ties.He also had informal meetings with the business community of China and Pakistani Diaspora living there.	
Switzerland	Bürgenstock	June 21-22	PM Shehbaz engaged in talks with a delegation of Iran and United States of America after the signing of the Islamabad Memorandum.	
Iran	Tehran	3-4 July	Attended the state funeral of Supreme Leader Ali Khamenei. Also met with President Masoud Pezeshkian to strengthen ties in trade, energy, border security, and regional connectivity. Both sides pledged to promote peace in South Asia and deepen regional cooperation.	
Turkey	Istanbul	4–5 July	Prime Minister Shehbaz Sharif visited Turkey meet President Erdoğan. They discussed defense, intelligence sharing, trade (targeting $5 billion), and regional stability.	
Qatar	Doha	14 July	PM Shehbaz lands in Qatar with his brother former Prime Minister Nawaz Sharif. Both met with Qatari Emir Sheikh Tamim bin Hamad Al Thani to offer the condolence on demise of his father Shiekh Hamad bin Khalifa Al Thani.	
Saudi Arabia	Jeddah, Makkah, Medina	6—8 August	The Mecca Defence Alliance was signed by Sharif, Saudi Crown Prince Mohammad bin Salman, and Turkiye’s President Recep Tayyip Erdogan.	
Kyrgyzstan	Bishkek	1–2 September	PM Shehbaz attended 2026 Bishkek SCO summit	
United Kingdom	London	20-22 September	PM Sharif addressed the overseas Pakistani diaspora in London.	
USA	New York, Washington DC	22-26 September	PM Sharif reached New York to attend the 81th session of the United Nations General Assembly.	
Turkey	Antalya	11-13 November	Sharif is scheduled to attend the 2026 United Nations Climate Change Conference.	

== Future trips ==
Country	Location	Date	Details
Switzerland	Davos	January 2027	Sharif is scheduled to attend the Davos Forum.
Azerbaijan	Baku	23-24 June 2027	Sharif is scheduled to attend the 16th OIC summit.

== See also ==
- Foreign relations of Pakistan
