= Chief ministership of Shehbaz Sharif =

Government position for the Punjab, Pakistan

Shehbaz Sharif
- شہباز شریف
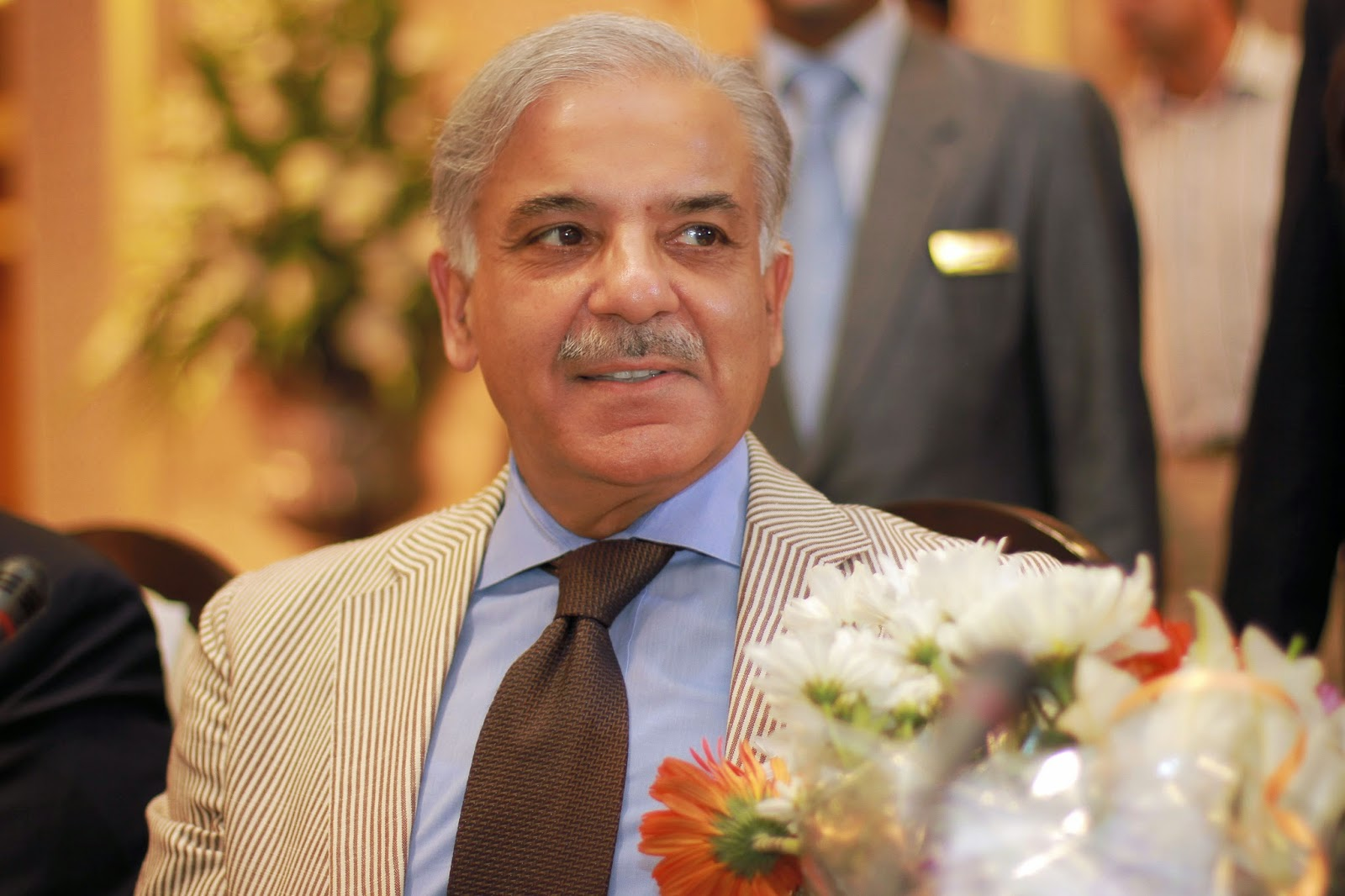
- Mian Shahbaz Sharif

Chief Minister of Punjab
- In office 8 June 2013 – 8 June 2018
- Governor: Chaudhry Mohammad Sarwar; Malik Muhammad Rafique Rajwana
- Preceded by: Najam Sethi (Caretaker)
- Succeeded by: Hasan Askari Rizvi (Caretaker)
- Majority: Pakistan Muslim League (N)
- In office 8 June 2008 – 26 March 2013
- Governor: Makhdoom Ahmed Mehmood; Latif Khosa; Salmaan Taseer
- Preceded by: Dost Muhammad Khosa
- Succeeded by: Najam Sethi (Caretaker)
- In office 20 February 1997 – 12 October 1999
- Governor: Shahid Hamid; Zulfiqar Ali Khosa
- Preceded by: Mian Muhammad Afzal Hayat (Caretaker)
- Succeeded by: Chaudhry Pervaiz Elahi

Shehbaz Sharif served the longest tenure in history as chief minister of Punjab spanning over 11 years of rule. His tenures involved the 1997 Nawaz Government, the 2008 Pakistan Peoples Party's regime and the 2013 PML-N's rule. His prominent contribution involves infrastructure development, transit projects and power plants. He has developed flyovers, road infrastructures, transit services and power projects. He is best known for his dedication, working speed, ability to execute mega projects and quick actions. However, he is also heavily criticised over lack of priorities, spending development funds mostly in Lahore and large cities, keeping major power and assignments within himself, nepotism, conflict of interests, and misuse of authority by opposition parties.

His vision in transit system involves Lahore Metrobus, Rawalpindi-Islamabad Metrobus, Multan Metrobus and Orange Line (Lahore Metro), several flyovers and road projects majorly in larger cities especially Lahore. His main work in education includes, Danish School, Punjab Educational Endowment Fund and the Chief Minister Laptop Scheme. His electric power initiates include, Nandipur Power Project, Quaid-e-Azam Solar Park and other projects. To maintain security and enforce law and order, he started the Dolphin Force and the Safe Cities Project. He had done some tremendous work during the dengue outbreak in Punjab and capped it successfully within a short period of time. However, Shehbaz Sharif also remained surrounded with several controversies including Model town incident, scam, and corruption probes over development projects.

== Tenure of Chief Ministership ==
The chief ministership of Shehbaz Sharif began on 20 February 1997, with formation of majority provincial government in the Punjab, Pakistan. This occurred upon dismissal of the government by-then President Leghari after alleged corruption and abuse of power, which was two years earlier than 5-year tenure. After the 1997 Pakistani general election, Sharif became 9th Chief Minister of Punjab. His first tenure started on 20 February 1997 and ended on 12 October 1999 with 1999 Pakistani coup d'état.

Sharif again became chief minister of Punjab on 8 June 2008 after his fourth win from Bhakkar constituency in by-polls held in June 2008 and subsequently elected chief minister unopposed after securing 265 votes in the 371-members provincial assembly. After the 2013 general election, Sharif remained Chief Minister of Punjab after securing 214 seats out of 372.

No.	Regime	Election	Term of office		
1	Nawaz Government 1997 (1997–1999)	1997 Pakistani general election	20 February 1997	12 October 1999	2 years, 234 days
2	Pakistan Peoples Party 2008 (2008–2012)	2008 Pakistani general election	11 April 2008	8 June 2008	58 days
3	Pakistan Peoples Party 2008 (2008–2012)	2008 Pakistani general election	30 March 2009	26 March 2013	3 years, 361 days
4	Pakistan Muslim League (N) 2013 (2013–2018)	Pakistani general election, 2013	23 June 2013	7 June 2018	4 years, 349 days

=== First term (1997–99) ===
During his first tenure as chief minister of Punjab, he focused on health, education, agriculture, and industrial sectors.

=== Second and third term (2008–13) ===
During election 2008 Pakistani general election obtained 59 seats out of total 296 as compared to 45 seats of Pakistan peoples Party. During this tenure Shahbaz Shareef initiated "Sasti Roti scheme" (bread on subsidised rates), disbursed laptop among students, and other key initiatives.

=== Third term (2013–2018) ===
Election 2013 marked landslide victory for Pakistan Muslim League (Nawaz) securing 214 seats in Punjab Assembly. Shehbaz Sharif was selected 17th chief minister and fourth time in Punjab. The fourth term continued major policies from the third tenure, including mass transportation systems in Punjab. Shehbaz Sharif initiated several power projects during his fourth tenure, started Lahore Waste Management Company, and initiated numerous health and education projects.

== Policies ==
=== Mass transportation ===
During his third tenure, he initiated a rapid urban transportation project in Lahore namely Lahore Metrobus. The project started operating in 2013 and has 27 stations along a 27 km corridor that stretches from Shahdara to Gajumata. He started two further metro networks in Rawalpindi, Rawalpindi-Islamabad Metrobus and in Multan Metrobus under China-Pakistan Economic Corridor. Shahbaz Shareef also started the metro railway system in Lahore commonly known as Orange Line (Lahore Metro). The first phase of the project was started in October 2015, while in October 2016, Phase 2 of the project was started. The project was inaugurated on 26 October 2020, by Chief minister Usman Buzdar though most of the work was completed in the fourth tenure of Shahbaz Shareef.

=== Energy ===
Shahbaz Shareef's tenure marked key improvements in energy projects in installed capacity under China-Pakistan economic corridor. The projects include 400MW Quaid-e-Azam Solar Park, 425 MW Nandipur Power Project, 1,223MW Balloki Power Plant (RLNG based), 1,230MW Haveli Bahadur Shah Power Plant (LNG based) and 1320 Megawatt Sahiwal Coal Power Project.

== See also ==
- Premiership of Shehbaz Sharif
