= EVM Pilot Project =

Electronic Voting Machine Pilot Project in Pakistan

- Type: Electronic Voting Machine
- Industry: Voting technology
- Headquarters: Pakistan

EVM Pilot Project was an under process Electronic Voting Machine for the forthcoming general elections in Pakistan and giving the right to vote to Pakistanis living abroad.

The ruling party had already passed the bill in the National Assembly on the basis of majority in a joint session.

== Elections (Amendment) Act, 2021 ==
On 17 November 2021, Pakistan's National Assembly under Imran Khan's tenure passed "Elections (Amendment) Act, 2021" with a total of 221 votes against the opposition parties’ 203 votes, with motivation to counter vote-rigging and corruption. The bill gave voting rights to overseas Pakistanis for the first time via an online voting system.

== Reversal ==
After Imran Khan's successful ouster in 2022, the new government rapidly passed the "Election (Amendment) Act, 2022", which reversed the introduction of EVMs.

== Controversy ==
Opposition parties had stated they will not run in the elections, saying the use of electronic voting machines is tantamount to rigging the upcoming elections.

The Election Commission also expressed its concerns over the use of this machine and had submitted 37 points in this regard in writing to the Standing Committee.
