= United Nations Security Council Resolution 647 =

UN Security Council Resolution 647
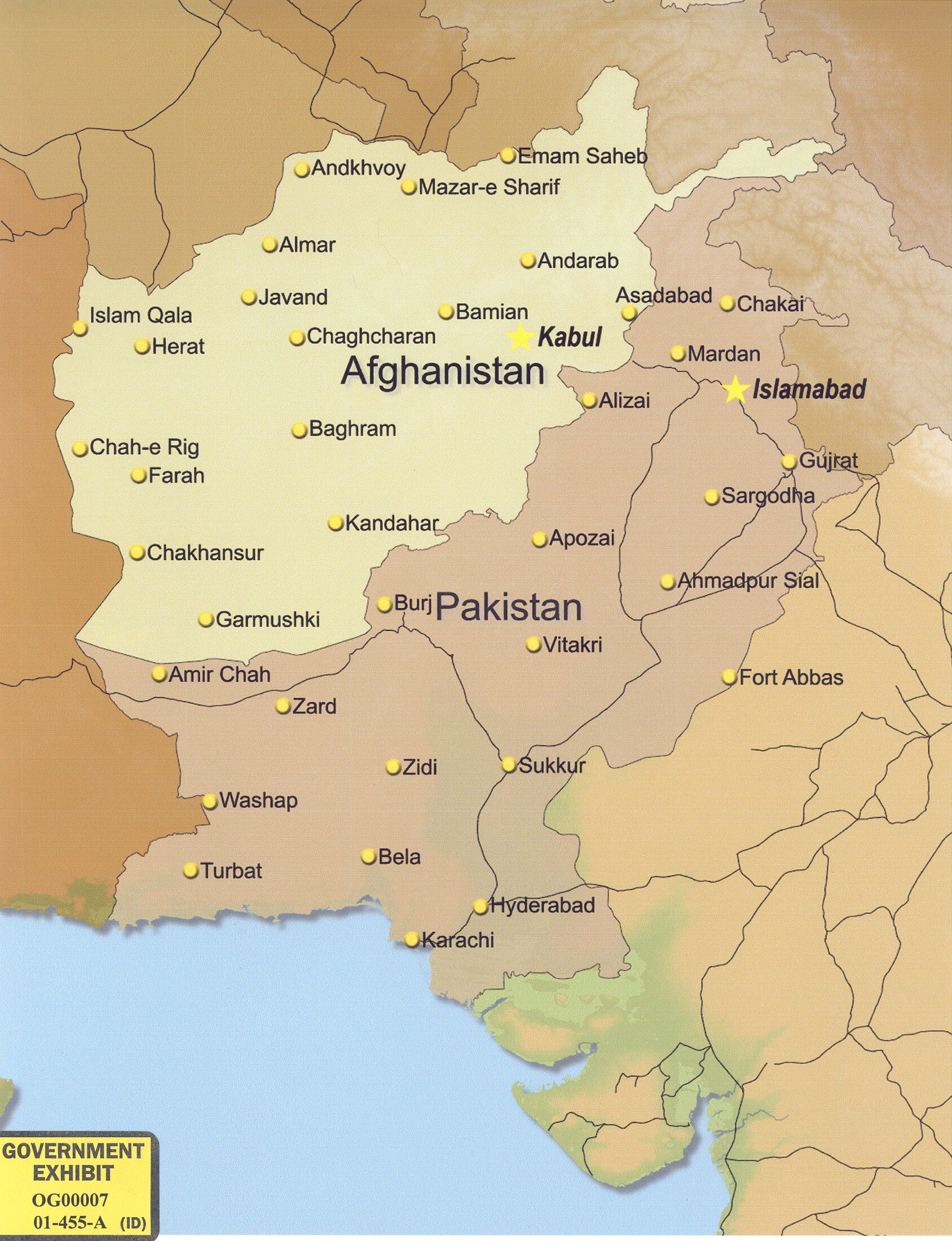
- Afghanistan and Pakistan
- Date: 11 January 1990
- Meeting no.: 2,904
- Code: S/RES/647 (Document)
- Subject: Afghanistan–Pakistan
- Voting summary: 15 voted for; None voted against; None abstained
- Result: Adopted

Security Council composition
- Permanent members: China; France; Soviet Union; United Kingdom; United States
- Non-permanent members: Canada; Colombia; Côte d'Ivoire; Cuba; Ethiopia; Finland; Malaysia; Romania; South Yemen; Zaire

United Nations Security Council resolution 647, adopted unanimously on 11 January 1990, after recalling Resolution 622 (1988) and a letter by the Secretary-General concerning the settlement of the situation in Afghanistan, the Council endorsed the letter's proposals regarding the United Nations Good Offices Mission in Afghanistan and Pakistan.

The Council then extended the mandate of the Mission for two months, until 15 March 1990, in accordance with the recommendations of the Secretary-General Javier Pérez de Cuéllar, and requested him to keep the Council updated on developments in the region.

== See also ==
- Afghanistan–Pakistan relations
- List of United Nations Security Council Resolutions 601 to 700 (1987–1991)
- Soviet–Afghan War
