= Pakistan and the United Nations =

Islamic Republic of Pakistan

United Nations membership
- Represented by: Dominion of Pakistan (1947–1956); Islamic Republic of Pakistan (1956–present)
- Membership: Full member
- Since: 30 September 1947
- UNSC seat: non-permanent

Pakistan officially joined the United Nations (UN) on 30 September 1947 just over a month after it came into existence. It is also one of the countries which has had a diplomat, Muhammad Zafarullah Khan, serve a term as the President of the United Nations General Assembly.

== Representation ==
Pakistan maintains a permanent mission to the UN, which is currently headed by Ambassador Munir Akram in New York. There is a second mission based at the UNO office in Geneva, Switzerland.

== Pakistan in UN Agencies ==
Pakistan participates in all of the UN's specialized agencies to reduce poverty, emergency response, and climate resilience. These include: United Nations Development program (UNDP), the World Food Programme (WFP), the World Health Organization (WHO), the United Nations International Children's Emergency Fund (UNICEF), the United Nations Educational, Scientific and Cultural Organization (UNESCO), UN International Fund for Agricultural Development (IFAD), the United Nations High Commission for refugees (UNHCR), and UN Habitat.

== Peacekeeping ==
The Pakistani military has played a key role in the UN's peacekeeping programme in different parts of the world, most prominently in Somalia, Sierra Leone, Bosnia, Congo and Liberia. The first time that Pakistani troops participated in a UN peacekeeping mission was in Congo in 1960. Pakistani troops have served in 29 countries so far, in a total of 46 UN peacekeeping missions. 168 Pakistani soldiers have been martyred whilst partaking in peacekeeping missions. As of 2009, Pakistan stood as the largest contributor of troops to United Nations peacekeeping missions in the world, and was followed by Bangladesh and India.

== Politics ==
=== Pakistan's Mission ===
The international community considers The state of Jammu and Kashmir divided into three parts occupied by India, Pakistan and a part by China. In June 1947, Sir Cyril Radcliffe set up 2 Boundary Commissions to"demarcate the boundaries of the two parts of the Punjab based on ascertaining the contiguous majority areas of Muslims and non-Muslims. In doing so, it will also take into account other factors."At the time, Jammu and Kasmir had 4 million inhabitants, the majority, Muslim, with the Maharaja being Hindu. In September 1947, he started a campaign to drive many Afghan Mujahideen sent by Pakistan, for the sole purpose of destabilization, out of Kashmir. over 200,00 fled and finally, the Muslims rose in rebellion. The Maharaja initially fought back but appealed for assistance to the Governor-General Louis Mountbatten, who agreed on the condition that the ruler accede to India. Hari Singh signed the Instrument of Accession on 26 October 1947, which was accepted by the Governor General of India the next day. Once the Instrument of Accession was signed, Indian soldiers entered Kashmir with orders to evict the rebels. India took the matter to the United Nations. The UN resolution asked Pakistan to pull its Army out from Kashmir. Still, it allowed India to leave only the minimum number of troops needed to keep civil order so that a referendum could be held under UN observation. After the required withdrawal of Pakistani troops in Kashmir (Azad Kashmir and Gilgit Baltistan) did not occur for several years Jammu & Kashmir National Conference which was the largest political party in the state recommended convening the constituent assembly in a resolution passed on 27 October 1950.[7] On 1 May 1951 Karan Singh then Head of state of Jammu and Kashmir issued a proclamation directing the formation of this assembly. The assembly was to be constituted of elected representatives of the people of the state. For purposes of this election, the state was divided into constituencies containing a population of 40,000 or as near thereto as possible each electing one member.[8] The United Nations Security Council stated in its resolution 91 dated 30 March 1951 that it would not consider elections held only in Indian-administered Kashmir to be a substitute for a free and impartial plebiscite including the people of the entire state of Jammu and Kashmir.[7]

However, the 1951 elections were said to be rigged. Polls were conducted in Indian administered Kashmir in August–September 1951. There were no women registered as voters in the 1951 Jammu and Kashmir elections. But there was one woman who contested and lost her deposit.[9] Jammu & Kashmir National Conference won 75 seats under the leadership of Sheikh Abdullah.[10][11] On 31 October 1951, he addressed the assembly for the first time and called on it to frame the state constitution and to give a 'reasoned conclusion regarding accession'. On 15 February 1954 the assembly members who were present cast a unanimous vote ratifying the state's accession to India.[13][14] Constitution was drafted which came into force on 26 January 1957. Part II, section (3) of the constitution states 'The State of Jammu and Kashmir is and shall be an integral part of the Union of India'.In 1956 the Constituent Assembly finalized its constitution, which declared the former Princely State of Jammu and Kashmir to be 'an integral part of the Union of India'. Elections were held the next year for a Legislative Assembly. This section cannot be legally amended as per provisions of Part XII of the constitution. The United Nations Military Observer Group in India and Pakistan (UNMOGIP) was deployed to supervise the ceasefire between India and Pakistan. UNMOGIP's functions were to investigate complaints of ceasefire violations and submit findings to each party and the U.N. Secretary-General.

=== Kashmir conflict ===
The UN remains a keen observer of the Kashmir conflict between Pakistan and India, centering on the disputed state of Jammu and Kashmir. Since the transfer of power to both countries in 1947 of the divided territory, the UN has played an extensive role in regulating and monitoring the dispute.

=== UN Security Council resolutions ===
- Resolution 29, admission of Pakistan (along with North Yemen) into the UN.
- Resolution 38, the question of India-Pakistan.
- Resolution 47, to help the governments of India and Pakistan restore peace and order to the region and prepare for a referendum to decide the fate of Kashmir.
- Resolution 622 & 647, situation in Afghanistan and establishment of UNGOMAP.
- Resolution 1172, condemnation of Indian and Pakistani nuclear tests.

== See also ==
- United Nations Good Offices Mission in Afghanistan and Pakistan
- United Nations peacekeeping missions involving Pakistan
