= Pakistanis in Qatar =

Total population
- 300,000 (Oct 2025)

Regions with significant populations
- Doha · Mesaieed · Wakra · Al Khor

Languages
- Sindhi · Arabic · Urdu . Balochi · Western Punjabi · Pashto · Persian · Saraiki ·

Religion
- Islam, Hinduism, Christianity

Related ethnic groups
- Blochs · Afghans · Punjabis · Pashtuns · Persians · Arab Pakistanis · Sindhis · British Pakistanis

Pakistanis in Qatar are citizens of Pakistan and holders of Pakistani passports.

== History ==
The presence of Pakistanis in Qatar can be traced back to the 1940s when early community members arrived and settled. Early Pakistanis were initially professionals mainly in the services sector.

== Demographics ==
Pakistani professionals serve in the fields of petroleum, construction, banking, finance, education, engineering, medicine, social work, and beyond.

=== Pakistani Youth in Qatar ===
A large number of Pakistani youth in Qatar play a role in business, sports, and government as well as private sectors. Mr. Mohammad Shahbaz Ali, an entrepreneur from Jhelum, (Pakistan) and youth wing president (Pml-n Qatar) a Leading Political Party of Pakistan.

== Education ==
=== Pakistan Education Centre (PEC) ===
One of the early expatriate schools, it was formed in 1967 then affiliated with Lahore Board of Higher Secondary School Examinations. Led by Dr. Abdul Qawi, active & leading Pakistani community members first started this school in Maguvilina District of Doha. On a decision by the Pakistan Ministry of Foreign Affairs in 1978, some schools run by Pakistani community members were taken over by the Pakistan Embassy. Since then. Pakistan Education Center (Pakistani School) is run by Pakistan ambassador with the help of a Board of Governors. The current school premises were given to the Pakistani community by the Government of Qatar. These are the first ever premises given to any expatriate community and were inaugurated in 1985 by the then president of Pakistan, General Muhammad Zia-ul-Haq. Pakistani School name was renamed as PEC in 1985. The school is affiliated to the Federal Board of Intermediate and Secondary Education (FBISE), Islamabad, Pakistan. All Pakistani schools formed in Doha, Qatar were established by experienced Pakistani nationals who have worked in Pakistan.

PEC, offers education from kindergarten right up to senior high school and Intermediate levels. It has a separate wing for the Cambridge Education System, started in September 2013. The dignitaries who have visited PEC include General Mohammad Zia Ul Haq, then President of Pakistan, in 1985; Sheikh Hamad Bin Khalifa AlThani, then Crown Prince of State of Qatar, in 1992; Pakistani Prime Minister Mohammad Nawaz Sharif in 1992; and Prime Minister Yousuf Raza Gillani in February 2012.

=== Pak Shama School (PSS) ===
The school was founded in 1964 by Edward Sardar & his wife (both from Sialkot) under affiliation with Lahore Board of Higher Secondary Education. It is the first expatriate school in Qatar and is presently affiliated to the Federal Board of Intermediate and Secondary Education in Islamabad, Pakistan. In addition to Higher Secondary Education system, the school has Cambridge Education System facilities for interested students.

Shahbaz Ali Khan completed his college education from this school. He was amongst the toppers and also participated in different sports and proved himself.

=== Bright Future International School (BFIS) ===
Formerly known as Bright Future Pakistani International School (BFIS), the school was inaugurated in 1996. It is affiliated with Federal Board of Intermediate & Secondary Education Islamabad, and also have facilities for Cambridge Education System. The school offers classes from nursery to college level.

== Sports ==
=== Qatar Cricket Association ===
In 1980, 12 cricket teams gathered and formed the Qatar Cricket Association. M. A. Shahid (Then working with Fardan Exchange) was chosen as its first & founder President and Saifuddin Khalid as General Secretary. In 1996, the Youth & Sports General Authority of Qatar via Resolution No.13/1996 announced His Highness Shaikh Hamad Bin Jassim Bin Jaber Al Thani - Prime Minister of Qatar as the chairman of the executive board and Fahad Hussain Al Fardan as vice chairman. In June 1999, the QCA was accepted as an affiliate member with ICC and an associate member with the Asian Cricket Council. Tamoor Sajjad of QCA made its record in ACC tournaments with the highest runs in Under-14 at Malaysia and then in Thailand for Under 17 ACC Tournaments.

=== Mesaieed Hockey Club ===
The club was established in Oct 2011, composed of Pakistani players from various companies. Currently led by Mr Muhammad Saifullah Khan as captain.

- Waleed Hamzah - football player (Al-Arabi forward). He was awarded the Asian Young Footballer of the Year by the Asian Football Confederation (AFC) in 1999. He played for Qatar at the 1999 FIFA U-17 World Championship, New Zealand and the 2004 AFC Asian Cup. He was signed to Al Wakrah on May 26, 2011.

== See also ==
- Pakistan–Qatar relations
- Pakistani diaspora
- Ethnic groups in Qatar
