= First premiership of Shehbaz Sharif =

Government of Pakistan from 2022-2023

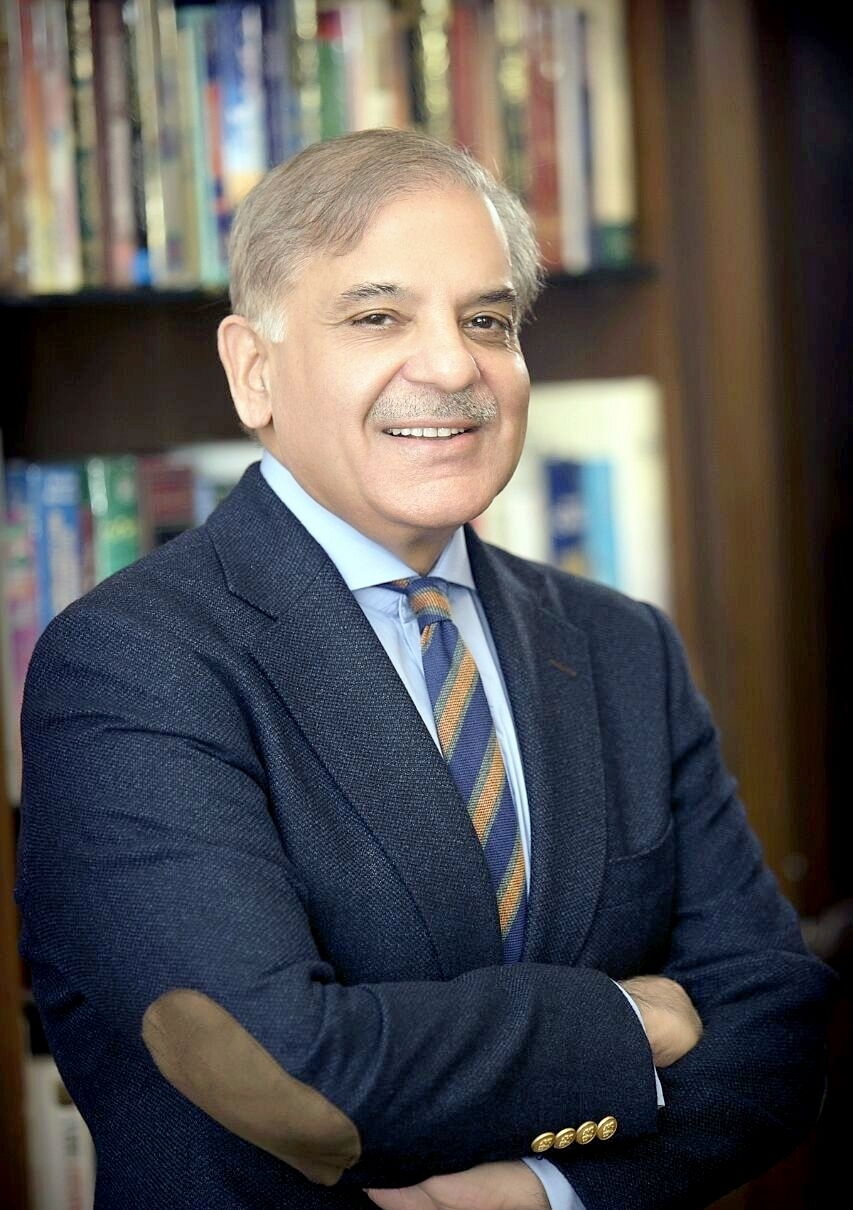
- Premiership of Shehbaz Sharif
- President: Arif Alvi (2022-24); Asif Ali Zardari; (2024-Present)
- Party: Pakistan Muslim League (N)
- Seat: Prime Minister's Office
- First term 11 April 2022 – 14 August 2023
- Cabinet: First Cabinet
- Election: 2022

The premiership of Shehbaz Sharif began on 11 April, 2022 after he was nominated as a candidate for Prime Minister of Pakistan by opposition parties following a vote of no confidence in then-Prime Minister Imran Khan during the 2022 Pakistani constitutional crisis. He was sworn in as prime minister by Senate Chairman Sadiq Sanjrani while acting as president on behalf of Arif Alvi. Sharif remained in office until 14 August 2023, when he stepped down for a caretaker government to participate in the 2024 general election.

== Accession ==
After the 2022 Pakistan economic crisis led to political instability, the struggle was also joined by several dissident members of Khan's own party, Pakistan Tehreek-e-Insaf (PTI). On 10 April 2022, the coalition succeeded in ousting Khan through a no-confidence motion, after which the Pakistan Democratic Movement formed its own government, choosing the opposition leader Shehbaz Sharif as the country's prime minister.

== Economic policy ==
The new government was faced with multiple economic challenges upon formation, mainly relating to the completion of the $6 billion IMF bailout program approved during Imran Khan's tenure. The government decided not to remove fuel and power subsidies imposed by Imran Khan during the last days of his tenure, viewing such a move as politically damaging to the new government. This was opposed by the Finance Ministry on the grounds that it could jeopardize the IMF program and increase the fiscal deficit.

=== PM's Kissan Package ===
Following wide-spread flooding and farmer protests led by the Pakistan Kissan Ittehad in 2022, Shehbaz Sharif announced a Rs. 1.8 trillion Kisan Package. The package included the following measures;

- Rs. 5 billion for flood-hit farmer loans
- Produce Index Unit (PIU) value increased to Rs. 10,000 for agro-loans
- Rs. 10 billion for agricultural small and medium enterprises (SMEs)
- GoP import program of 5-year-old, second-hand tractors
  - 50% rebate on duty for importing 5-year-old, second-hand tractors
  - 36% rebate on duty for importing 3-year-old tractors
  - Duty on completely knocked down (CKD) parts reduced from 35% to 15%
- Subsidy on Di-ammonium phosphate (DAP), Rs. 11,250 per bag
- Distribution of 1.2 million bags of wheat seeds (Rs13.20 billion for program)
- GoP import program of 500,000 tons of urea
  - Rs. 30 billion subsidy program on urea
- GoP import program of 1.6 million tons of wheat
- DISCO and K-Electric private agro-consumers provided Rs3.60/kWh decrease
- Tubewell electricity tariff decreased by Rs3.60/kWh

The State Bank of Pakistan has financed the following measures of the "PM’s Kissan Package;"

- Markup Waiver Scheme (MWS): subsistence farmers with "outstanding" debts of up to Rs 500,000 per loan had their mark-up's waived. Under the MWS banks waived Rs 2.96 billion.
- GoP Markup Subsidy Scheme (GMSS): Rs. 10.05 billion outlaid to 43,465 borrowers with debts of Rs. 500,000
- Interest Free Loans and Risk Sharing Scheme for Landless Farmers (IF&RSLF): Upton Rs. 200,000 in interest free loans, Rs. 5.8 billion outlaid to 47,425 borrowers.
- Markup Subsidy and Risk Sharing Scheme for Farm Mechanization (MSRSSFM): Loans up to Rs. 30 million for purchase of "tractors, threshers, combined harvesters, planters etc." The scheme was extended by Govt to June 30, 2024.
- PM’s Youth Business and Agriculture Loan Scheme (PMYB&ALS): Loan Scheme, Rs 26.8 billion disbursed by March 31, 2024

Despite a subsidy on DAP and Urea fertilizers, an inter-ministerial meeting of the Kissan Package found that their use had declined due to continued increases in prices and decreases in supply.

== Foreign policy ==
The government immediately sought to mend ties with the United States that were strained by Imran Khan's Lettergate controversy, despite Washington's increasing prioritization of India over Pakistan in its foreign policy. Experts believed the goal of this was to balance relations between the US and China, while also prioritising CPEC-related cooperation with China. However, Pakistan has only received a limited response from the Biden administration, the United States and India have also demanded that Pakistan stop cross-border terrorist activities.

== Political crisis ==
2022–2023 Pakistan political unrest continues, and clashes intensify after arrest of former PM Imran Khan. Following the unrest, the Pakistani government supported the transfer of protesters to court-martial. The Economist Intelligence Unit (EIU) downgraded Pakistan from a 'hybrid regime' to an 'authoritarian regime', in its Democracy Index 2023.

== See also ==
- First Shehbaz Sharif Government
- Second Shehbaz Sharif Government
- Chief Ministership of Shehbaz Sharif
- List of international prime ministerial trips made by Shehbaz Sharif
