= Gwadar Oil City =

- Industry: Oil and gas
- Headquarters: Gwadar, Balochistan, Pakistan
- Products: Petroleum products
- Services: Refining and processing

Gwadar Oil City is a proposed mega oil city that will be established on 88,000 acres of land in the Gwadar district, Balochistan, Pakistan. Its primary objective is to create a substantial oil city intended for the refining and processing of petroleum products, predominantly sourced from the Persian Gulf area. The refined products will serve both regional and local needs. The financial commitment for this venture is projected to range between $10-12 billion, and the establishment of the oil city will be undertaken by a Saudi enterprise.

== History ==
The preparation and design phases for Pakistan's most extensive oil city, slated to accommodate the significant $10 billion Aramco Oil Refinery endeavor. This initiative is situated in the southwestern Balochistan province. During the visit of Saudi Crown Prince Mohammed bin Salman in 2019, Saudi Arabia and Pakistan inked seven investment agreements worth $21 billion. Among these agreements was the long-term undertaking of the Aramco oil refinery project. The Aramco Oil Refinery, estimated at $10 billion and endowed with an oil refining capacity ranging from 250,000 to 300,000 barrels per day, is anticipated to require a span of 5 to 6 years from its inception to the point of operational commencement.

Apart from the involvement of Saudi Arabia, there has been keen interest from Chinese enterprises to establish refineries within the Gwadar Oil City. China's East Sea Group Limited has unveiled intentions to commit $4.5 billion for the establishment of a refinery with an annual oil processing capacity of 8 million tons in Gwadar. This refinery project holds the promise of furnishing Pakistan with considerable storage capacity, allowing for the retention of reserves over extended periods, thereby contributing to the conservation of foreign exchange.
