= First Nawaz Sharif provincial government =

Provincial Govt in Punjab, Pakistan (1985–88)

- Cabinet of Punjab, Pakistan
- Date formed: 5 April 1985
- Date dissolved: 30 May 1988

People and organisations
- Head of state: Muhammad Zia-ul-Haq
- Head of government: Muhammad Khan Junejo
- Member party: Pakistan Muslim League
- Status in legislature: Majority

History
- Predecessor: Qureshi provincial government
- Successor: Second Nawaz Sharif provincial government

The First Nawaz Sharif provincial government was formed by Nawaz Sharif in April 1985 to begin a new government following the 1985 Pakistani general election. It was dissolved on 30 May 1988.

== Cabinet ==
=== Ministers ===
Following were the members of the cabinet:

- Ch Abdul Ghafoor (PP-229 – Bahawalnagar) — Agriculture, Law and Parliamentary Affairs
- Ch Muhammad Iqbal (PP-137 – Gujranwala) — Revenue, Relief & Consolidations
- Ch Mumtaz Hussain (PP-201 – Sahiwal) — Education, Finance, Excise and Taxation
- Chaudhry Pervaiz Elahi (PP-28 – Gujrat) — Local Government and Rural Development
- Makhdoom Altaf Ahmed (PP-236 – Rahim Yar Khan) — Finance (Additional charge Excise and Taxation)
- Malik Khuda Bakhsh Khan Tiwana (PP-39 – Khushab) — Auqaf, Local Government and Rural Development
- Malik Saleem Iqbal (PP-16 – Chakwal) — Co-operatives, Fisheries and Wildlife
- Mehr Ghulam Dastgir Lak (PP-43 – Sargodha) — Food Department
- Shaheen Atiq-ur-Rehman (Women Seat) — Social Welfare & Women's Division
- Abdul Qayyum Awan (PP-69 – Faisalabad) — Labour, Jails, Zakat and Usher
- Abdul Razzaq (PP-160 – Khanewal) — Irrigation and Power
- Ghulam Haider Wyne (PP-161 – Khanewal) — Industries & Mineral Development, Planning and Development and Education
- Muhammad Arshad Khan Lodhi (PP-204 – Sahiwal) — Colonies, Revenue and Relief, Consolidation, Live Stock and Dairy Development
- Saeed Ahmed Khan Manais (PP-178 – Vehari) — Communication and Works, Food and Transport
- Saeed Ahmed Qureshi (PP-169 – Multan) — Zakat and Ushr
- Raja Iqbal Mehdi (PP-20 – Jhelum) — Forestry, Wildlife & Fisheries.
- Sardar Arif Rashid (PP-109 – Lahore) — Agriculture, Irrigation and Power, Forestry, Tourism and Culture
- Syed Afzaal Ali Shah (PP-216 – Okara) — Health, Communication and Works
- Syeda Sajida Nayyar Abidi (PP-142 – Sialkot) — Livestock & Dairy Development
- Raja Khalique Ullah Khan (PP-129 – Gujranwala), Law & Parliamentary Affairs
