= Lahore Waste Management Company =

- Formation: March 19, 2010; 16 years ago
- Founder: Local Government
- Purpose: Waste collection, transportation, recovery, treatment, disposal
- Location: Lahore, Pakistan
- Region served: Punjab, Pakistan
- Services: Solid Waste Management
- Key people: Sheryar Arif Khan (CEO)
- Parent organization: Suthra Punjab
- Website: www.lwmc.com.pk

Lahore Waste Management Company (LWMC) is a Public organization in Lahore, that is responible for sanitation and solid waste management reforms in Lahore, Sheikhupura, Nankana and Muridke.

== History ==
The Lahore Waste Management Company (LWMC) was established by the City District Government Lahore (CDGL) under Section 42 of the Companies Ordinance 1984 on 19 March 2010. The company is governed by a Board of Directors (BOD), which is headed by a Chairman. Following its establishment, a Services and Assets Management Agreement (SAAMA) was signed between CDGL and LWMC, transferring all functions and assets of the Solid Waste Management (SWM) department of CDGL and the Tehsil Municipal Administrations (TMAs) to LWMC.

LWMC's primary objective is to develop an integrated system for solid waste management, ensuring efficient collection, transportation, recovery, treatment, and disposal of waste generated within Lahore. To enhance operational efficiency, the company has recruited experienced professionals from various disciplines.

== Allegations of harsh working conditions for employees ==
Hundreds of sanitary workers accused the company's management of imposing harsh working conditions. These include deducting from wages for leaves taken and breaks taken for meals, overtime work and holiday work without payment and considering late attendance as not reporting to work. The company have also introduced a new attendance system where attendance of the sanitary workers are marked by photographing them. Photographs were also taken end of the day to sign off the workers. The photographs are often taken in public forcing the workers to pose for the camera, a practice that is especially opposed by female workers, using Android devices.

The management have rejected the allegations of the workers who demonstrated against the company on May 15, 2014 calling that they are "uneducated" and "hoodlums and riffraff."
