= Second Nawaz Sharif provincial government =

Pakistani provincial administration

First Nawaz Sharif provincial government
- Cabinet of Punjab, Pakistan
- Date formed: 30 November 1988
- Date dissolved: 6 August 1990

People and organisations
- Head of government: Benazir Bhutto
- Member party: Islami Jamhoori Ittehad
- Status in legislature: Majority

History
- Predecessor: First Nawaz Sharif provincial government
- Successor: Wyne provincial government

The Second Nawaz Sharif provincial government was formed by Nawaz Sharif in November 1988 to begin a new government following the 1988 Pakistani general election. It was dissolved on 6 August 1990.

== Cabinet ==
=== Ministers ===
Following were the members of the cabinet:

- Al-Haj Rana Phool Muhammad Khan (PP-149 – Kasur) — Cooperatives
- Ch Akhtar Ali (PP-104 – Sialkot) — Communication and Works– IJI
- Ch Muhammad Iqbal (PP-85 – Gujranwala) — Information
- Ch Muhammad Riaz (PP-10 – Rawalpindi) — Social Welfare– IJI
- Ch Parvez Elahi (PP-94 – Gujrat) — Local Government & Rural Development
- Dr Muhammad Afzal Eiaz (PP-1 – Rawalpindi) — Transport– IJI
- Makhdoom Ali Raza Shah (PP-72 – Toba Tek Singh) – PPP
- Shah Mahmood Qureshi (PP-166 – Multan) — Planning and Development
- Malik Ghulam Muhammad Noor Rabbani Khar (PP-212 – Muzaffargarh) — Wildlife and Fisheries
- Malik Salim Iqbal (PP-19 – Chakwal) — Health
- Khan Gul Hamid Khan Rokhri (PP-37 – Mianwali) — Food – IJI
- Muhammad Arshad Khan Lodhi (PP-182 – Sahiwal) — Revenue
- Saeed Ahmad Khan Manais (PP-193 – Vehari) — Agriculture– IJI
- Saeed Akbar Khan (PP-40 – Bhakkar) — Livestock and Dairy Development
- Qari Saeed-ur-Rehman (PP-13 – Attock) — Zakat & Ushr– IJI
- Raja Ashfaq Sarwar Khan (PP-8 – Rawalpindi) — Labour– IJI
- Sardar Amjad Hameed Khan Dasti (PP-211 – Muzaffargarh) — Finance
- Sardar Muhammad Arif Nakai (PP-150 – Kasur) — Industries and Mineral Development
- Sardar Nasrullah Khan Dreshak (PP-205 – Rajanpur) — Irrigation/Law & Parliamentary Affairs– IJI
- Zulfiqar Ali Khan Khosa (PP-201 – D.G.Khan) — Education, Finance, IJI
- Syed Afzaal Ali Shah (PP-158 – Okara) — Housing, Physical and Environmental Planning
- Syed Ahmad Mahmood (PP-238 – Rahim Yar Khan) — Excise & Taxation– IND
