= Pakistan–Saudi Arabia relations =

- Pakistan: Saudi Arabia

Diplomatic mission
- Pakistani embassy, Riyadh: Saudi Arabian embassy, Islamabad

Pakistan and Saudi Arabia established relations in 1947. Both countries are close allies, frequently described by analysts as constituting a special relationship. Pakistan has an embassy in Riyadh and a consulate-general in Jeddah while Saudi Arabia has an embassy in Islamabad and a consulate-general in Karachi.

Saudi Arabia historically supported Pakistan in the India–Pakistan wars and conflicts in the 1960s and 1970s; however, Saudi Arabia has relatively recently shifted towards a policy of neutrality in the conflict due to stronger ties with India. Saudi Arabia has also repeatedly rejected Pakistani requests to support Pakistan and condemn India on the Kashmir conflict. Pakistan–Saudi Arabia relations also deteriorated in 2015 when Pakistan refused to support the Saudi-led intervention in the Yemen civil war.

However, relations between the two states were greatly strengthened after the mutual defence pact in September 2025. In August 2026, Pakistan signed the Mecca Defence Alliance along with Turkey and Saudi Arabia. Pakistan also assumed the role of a guardian of Saudi Arabia against any external or internal threat.

== History ==
Saudi Arabia and Pakistan have sought to develop extensive commercial, cultural, religious, political, and strategic relations since the independence of Pakistan in 1947. Pakistan affirms its relationship with Saudi Arabia as their most "important and bilateral partnership" in the current foreign policy of Pakistan, working and seeking to develop closer bilateral ties with Saudi Arabia, the largest country on the Arabian Peninsula and host to the two holiest cities of Islam, Mecca and Medina and the destination of Muslim pilgrims from across the world.

According to a Pew Research Center survey, Pakistanis hold the most favorable perception of Saudi Arabians in the world, with 9 of 10 respondents viewing Saudi Arabia favorably. The kingdom has often tried to further enhance its relations with Pakistan by giving it gifts and loans. Often these are gifts with symbolic religious value. For example, in 2014 Saudi Arabia gave Pakistan 200 tonnes of dates as a gesture of friendship.

The Saudi Crown Prince, Muhammad bin Salman, visited Pakistan in February 2019. Pakistan was the first stop of the Crown Prince's journey to Pakistan and India. While there, the Crown Prince received a gold-plated submachine gun from members of the Pakistani Senate. The most important part of the visit was to sign an agreement to establish a $10 billion refinery and petrochemicals complex in Gwadar.

In June 2025, Prime Minister Shehbaz Sharif of Pakistan thanked Mohammed bin Salman for his role in helping reduce tensions between Pakistan and India. The acknowledgment came during Sharif's official two-day visit to Saudi Arabia, where he was accompanied by key members of his delegation, including the Chief of Army Staff, Asim Munir, the Deputy Prime Minister, Ishaq Dar, and several federal ministers. During the visit, which coincided with the final rituals of the Hajj pilgrimage, the Pakistani delegation also performed umrah in Mecca. According to a press release issued by the Prime Minister’s Office, Sharif met Crown Prince Mohammed Bin Salman in Mecca, where regional peace and bilateral cooperation were discussed. In September 2025, the two countries signed the Strategic Mutual Defence Agreement, according to which a military attack against one would be considered an aggression against both. Rabia Akhtar, a researcher at the Belfer Center at Harvard University, has questioned the assumption that the pact means a clear commitment to mutual defense. She noted that Pakistan refused to join the Saudi-led intervention in Yemen despite the Kingdom's requests, as Islamabad claimed neutrality and that domestic interests would precede any pact.

== Cultural relations ==
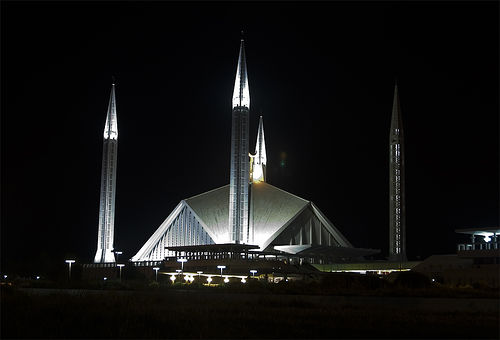
Faisal Mosque in Pakistan is named after King Faisal of Saudi Arabia, who supported and financed the construction of the mosque.

Saudi Arabia has also provided extensive religious and educational aid to Pakistan, being a major contributor to the construction of mosques and madrassas (religious schools) across Pakistan, including the Faisal Mosque in Islamabad, named after King Faisal of Saudi Arabia. The major Pakistani city of Lyallpur was also renamed Faisalabad in honor of King Faisal in 1977. Since 1980, the number of religious schools increased from 800 to 27000 in 1997 and all are funded by Saudi Arabia. The schools serve as nurseries for teenagers and younger children (giving religious and moral education) from Pakistan, Syria, Afghanistan, Iran, Russia, Yemen etc.

Saudi Arabia was a major supporter of the "Islamisation" programme of the military ruler Gen. Muhammad Zia-ul-Haq in the 1970s.

In 2006, King Abdullah of Saudi Arabia was awarded the Nishan-e-Pakistan, the highest civilian decoration of Pakistan.

In 2011, the Saudi-funded Islamic channel called Paigham TV was inaugurated by Abdul Rahman Al-Sudais in Urdu and later in Pashto in 2014.

== Political relations ==
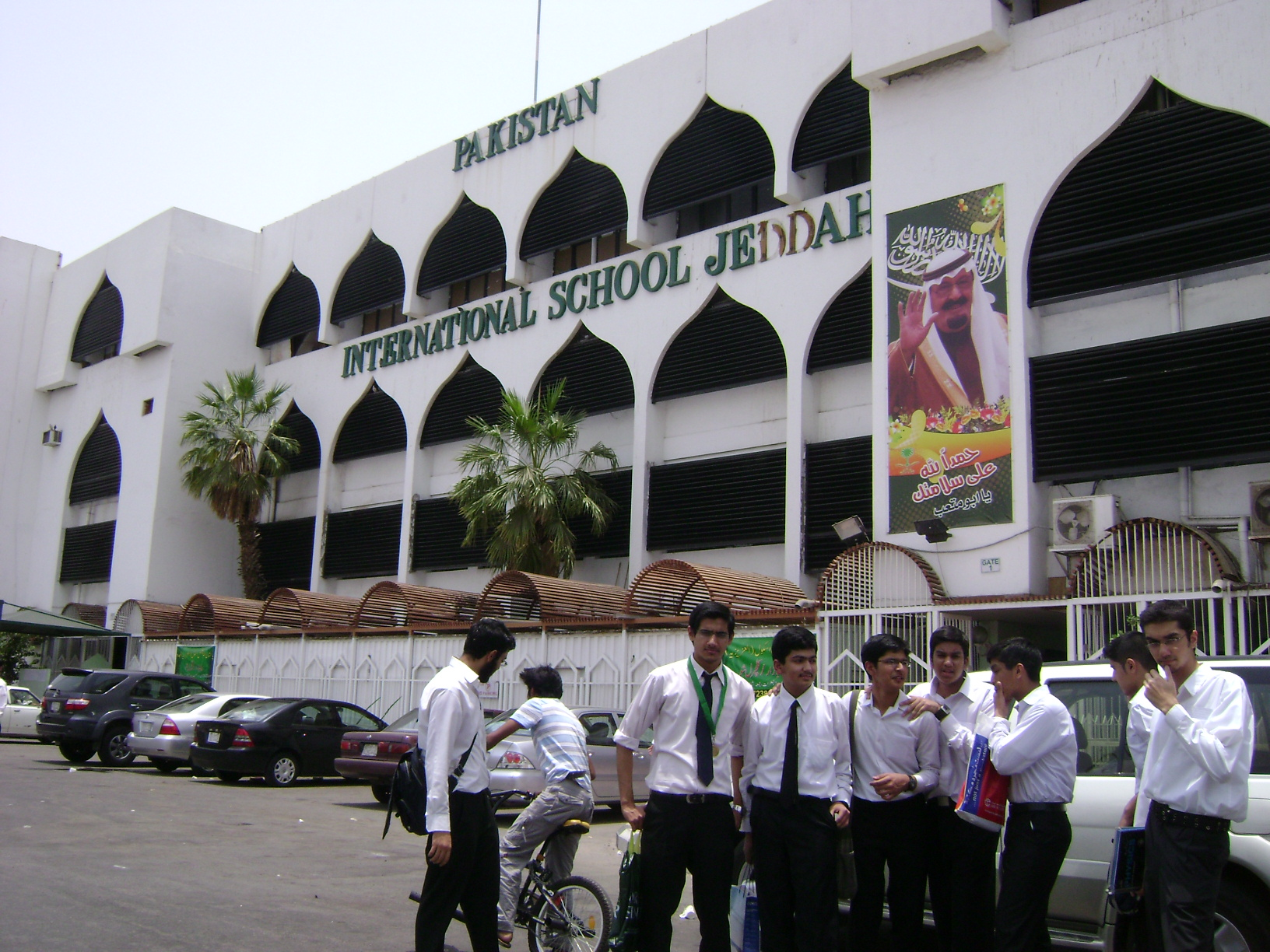
Pakistan International School, Jeddah

Since 1947, various Pakistani political parties have received Saudi funding.

=== India–Pakistan wars ===
Saudi Arabia supported Pakistan during the India–Pakistan war of 1965 and during the concurrent Bangladesh Liberation War and the India–Pakistan war of 1971.

However, Saudi Arabia later changed its stance from supporting to Pakistan to adopting a policy of neutrality in the 2019 India–Pakistan border skirmishes. Saudi Arabia also refrained from taking a side in the Kashmir conflict in 2019, despite Pakistan's request for Saudi to condemn the Indian revocation of the special status of Jammu and Kashmir. In 2020, Saudi Arabia again rejected Pakistani requests on the Kashmir conflict.

=== Afghan war ===
With Pakistan, it provided extensive financial and political support to the Afghan mujahideen fighting in the Soviet–Afghan War in the 1980s as part of Operation Cyclone. During the 1990–1991 Gulf War, Pakistan sent troops to protect the Islamic holy sites in Saudi Arabia, but strains developed when some Pakistani politicians and Gen. Mirza Aslam Beg, the then-chief of staff of the Pakistani army openly expressed support for Saddam Hussein's regime in Iraq and its invasion of Kuwait.

=== Gulf war ===
Along with the United Arab Emirates, Saudi Arabia and Pakistan were the only states to recognise Taliban rule in Afghanistan.

In May 1998, Saudi Arabia was the only country that was taken in complete confidence by Prime minister Nawaz Sharif on Pakistan's decision on performing atomic test in weapon-testing laboratories-III (WTL-III) in the region of the Chagai Hills. After he ordered the atomic tests (see codenames: Chagai-I and Chagai-II), Saudi Arabia, along with United Arab Emirates, were the only countries who backed Pakistan and congratulated the country for making the "bold decision". Furthermore, Saudi Arabia promised to supply 50,000 barrels per day of free oil to help Pakistan cope with likely economic sanctions in the aftermath.

=== Yemeni civil war ===
Pakistani defense minister Khawaja Asif warned on 9 September that the Houthi attacks on Saudi Arabia could activate the pact. Pakistan said on 10 September that there were no talks regarding military actions, but that the country would act "when the time comes." A condemnation of the Houthi attacks was made by Pakistani Prime Minister Shehbaz Sharif on 13 September, the Saudi Press Agency reported. Pakistan's DG ISPR Ahmed Sharif Chaudhry stated that Pakistan "stands with Saudi Arabia".

== Economic relations ==
Saudi Arabia is the largest source of petroleum for Pakistan. It also supplies extensive financial aid to Pakistan and remittance from Pakistani migrants in Saudi Arabia is also a major source of foreign currency for Pakistan. In recent years, both countries have exchanged high-level delegations and developed plans to expand bilateral cooperation in trade, education, real estate, tourism, information technology, communications and agriculture. Saudi Arabia is aiding the development of trade relations with Pakistan through the Gulf Cooperation Council, with which Pakistan is negotiating a free trade agreement; the volume of trade between Pakistan and GCC member states in 2006 stood at US$11 billion. Financial co-operation includes $3 billion in aid and loans, of which $1.5 billion was deposited in Pakistan's central bank.

In 2018 Saudi Arabia agreed to establish an oil refinery at Gwadar, with a proposed capacity of 500,000 barrels per day. In 2019, Saudi Arabia paid $20 billion to finance developmental projects in Pakistan. However, Saudi Arabia had to end the loan and oil supply deal including forcing Pakistan to repay $1 billion loan, amidst the latter's criticism that the Saudi Arabia led Organisation of Islamic Cooperation (OIC) was not doing enough to pressure India on the Kashmir issue. In 2023, Saudi Arabia and Pakistan signed a MEMO to build the oil refinery in Gwadar. It will be one of the biggest in Pakistan.

During Pakistan's economic crisis 2022–2023, Saudi Arabia demanded that Pakistan carry out sweeping economic reforms first to realize the IMF's package, otherwise it would not provide assistance as before.

=== Pakistani expats ===
Saudi Arabia remains a major destination for immigration amongst Pakistanis, the number of whom living in Saudi Arabia stands between 2 million (see Pakistanis in Saudi Arabia), making the Saudi Arabia's second-largest migrant community.

The Pakistani diaspora living in Saudi Arabia sends back remittances of 5.8 billion dollars back to Pakistan. However, many are poor laborers who are exploited by recruiters and agencies, and some are forced, coerced, or duped into drug smuggling. Leading to Saudi Arabia having some of the largest numbers of Pakistanis in their jail, which led to previous Prime Minister Imran Khan raising the issue with the Saudis.

However, Pakistani officials rarely visit these prisons, unlike officials from other countries. Though Saudi Arabia and Pakistan share friendly relations, the Saudi government shows apathy towards the treatment of Pakistani migrants. The Saudi government violated the Vienna Convention on Consular Relations since they are supposed to inform Pakistani officials when they arrest Pakistani citizens. Also, Pakistani relatives have little contact with the arrested Pakistani prisoners or prison officials retrieve the bodies after an execution. Pakistanis face poor treatment from their supervisors, which results in grievance for diaspora population, with some complaints starting right from the airport.

== Energy relations ==
=== Petroleum ===
In February 2019, Saudi Arabia's Saudi Aramco and SABIC announced to set up a US$10 billion oil refinery and petrochemical industry in Pakistan's deepwater port of Gwadar, Balochistan. It would also help refine and store imported oil for onward transportation to China and develop fuel supply chain for the landlocked Central Asian states. Fuel transportation to China through Pakistan would take just 7 days as opposed to the western route through Indian Ocean which takes almost 40 days.

=== Mining ===
Saudi Arabia is thought to possibly invest in Reko Diq Mine. It is a large copper mine located in the west of Pakistan in Balochistan. Reko Diq represents one of the largest copper reserves in Pakistan and in the world having estimated reserves of 5.9 billion tonnes of ore grading 0.41% copper. The mine also has gold mining reserves amounting to 41.5 million oz.

== Security relations ==
Pakistan maintains close military ties with Saudi Arabia, providing extensive support, arms, and training for the Saudi armed forces. Since the 1970s, Pakistani soldiers have been stationed in Saudi Arabia to protect the Kingdom. Pakistan has also been providing training to Saudi soldiers and pilots. Fighter Pilots of the Pakistan Air Force flew aircraft of the Royal Saudi Air Force during the Al-Wadiah War between Saudi Arabia and South Yemen in 1969, and Pakistan Army Corps of Engineers built Saudi fortifications along its border with Yemen.

It is also speculated that Saudi Arabia secretly funded Pakistan's atomic bomb programme and seeks to purchase atomic weapons from Pakistan to enable it to counteract possible threats from arsenals of the weapons of mass destruction possessed by Iran, Iraq and Israel. Both nations have received high-level delegations of scientists, government and Saudi military experts of seeking to study the development of a Saudi nuclear programme. Pakistan also formed a key intermediary in the Al-Yamamah arms deal with the United Kingdom.

According to Bruno Tertrais, a researcher for the EU Non-Proliferation Consortium, during informal discussions held in 2005 former Pakistan National Command Authority officials said that deploying Pakistan nuclear warheads in Saudi Arabia would be "worse than the Cuban missile crisis." Tertrais concluded that there is no hard evidence in the public domain of any nuclear cooperation between the two countries.

=== Strategic Mutual Defence Agreement ===
In September 2025, the two countries signed a mutual defense pact that treated an attack on either country as an attack on both. One anonymous Saudi official told Reuters that Pakistan will provide a nuclear umbrella to Saudi Arabia, saying "This is a comprehensive defensive agreement that encompasses all military means." However, specialists doubt that the pact includes the provision of a nuclear umbrella to Saudi Arabia, as it is not explicitly mentioned in the text or Pakistan's military doctrine. Tim Willasey-Wilsey, a researcher at RUSI, mentions that Riyadh would have to consider that Pakistan would consider several other factors before lending Riyadh a nuclear device.

=== Makkah Defence Alliance ===
On 7 August 2026, Pakistan, Saudi Arabia and Türkiye signed the Mecca Defence Alliance in Mecca, Saudi Arabia. The agreement was signed by Pakistani Prime Minister Shehbaz Sharif, Saudi Crown Prince and Prime Minister Mohammed bin Salman, and Turkish President Recep Tayyip Erdoğan. It established a framework for trilateral defence cooperation and mutual security. Under the agreement, an armed attack against any one of the three countries is to be regarded as an attack against all three. The agreement is intended to strengthen collective deterrence and defence cooperation among the three states. It does not, however, specify an automatic military response or establish an integrated military command comparable to that of NATO.

The agreement was concluded amid heightened security tensions in the Middle East and followed an expansion of Strategic Mutual Defence Agreement between Pakistan and Saudi Arabia. Pakistan had previously deployed fighter and support aircraft to Saudi Arabia in April 2026 under a bilateral strategic joint defence agreement. Pakistani officials described the trilateral agreement as defensive in nature and said it could remain open to participation by other countries. The agreement has been compared by some commentators with NATO's collective-defence principle, although analysts have noted differences in the three countries' strategic priorities and military structures. The agreement also marked an expansion of Pakistan and Saudi Arabia defence relations beyond their established bilateral cooperation.

=== Military procurement ===
Saudi Arabia is an importer of Pakistani arms and has purchased small and medium conventional weaponry worth millions of US dollars. Saudi Arabia has also negotiated the purchase of Pakistani ballistic missiles capable of carrying nuclear warheads.

On 2 April 2014, Pakistan Today reported that Pakistan would sell JF-17 Thunder jets to Saudi Arabia after the kingdom gave a grant of $1.5 billion to Pakistan in early 2014.

In 2016, Pakistan Ordnance Factories (POF) secured an export order worth US$81 million to Saudi Arabia.

=== Pakistani troops in Saudi Arabia ===
In the 1970s and 1980s, during the Iran–Iraq War approximately ~20,000 Pakistani soldiers were stationed in the kingdom. Between 1982 and 1987, Pakistan stationed approximately 20,000 servicemen in Saudi Arabia to defend Islamic holy sites. There are reportedly approximately 70,000 Pakistani servicemen serving in the military of Saudi Arabia.

In February 2018, Pakistan announced that it would be sending troops to Saudi Arabia on a "training and advise mission" but rejected a request from Saudi Arabia to contribute troops to the Saudi-led intervention in Yemen.

In April 2026, following the start of the 2026 Iran war, Pakistan deployed 13,000 troops and fighter jets to Saudi Arabia, in order to enhance joint military coordination and improve operational readiness.

== See also ==
- Foreign relations of Pakistan
- Foreign relations of Saudi Arabia
- Saudabad, Karachi
- Iran–Saudi Arabia proxy war
- International propagation of the Salafi movement and Wahhabism
- Pakistanis in Saudi Arabia
