= First Shehbaz Sharif provincial government =

Former Pakistani cabinet

- Cabinet of Punjab, Pakistan
- Date formed: 1997
- Date dissolved: 1999

People and organisations
- Head of state: Muhammad Rafiq Tarar
- Head of government: Shehbaz Sharif
- Member party: Pakistan Muslim League (N)
- Status in legislature: Majority

The First Shehbaz Sharif provincial government was formed by Shehbaz Sharif in 1997 to begin a new government following the 1997 Pakistani general election.

== Cabinet ==
=== Ministers ===
Following were the members of cabinet:

- Brig (Retd) Zulfiqar Ahmed Dhilloun (PP-134 – Sheikhupura) - PML(N) - Education
- Ch Muhammad Afzal Sahi (PP-54 – Faisalabad) - PML(N) - Communication & Works (1998-1999)
- Ch Muhammad Iqbal (PP-85 – Gujranwala) - PML(N)- Irrigation & Power
- Ch Muhammad Riaz (PP-10 – Rawalpindi) - PML(N) - Cooperatives
- Ch Shaukat Dawood (PP-239 – Rahim Yar Khan) - PML(N) - Revenue
- Muhammad Iqbal Khan Khakwani (PP-160 – Multan) - PML(N) - Food
- Haji Irfan Ahmed Khan Daha (PP-177 – Khanewal) - PML(N) - Transport
- Malik Saleem Iqbal (PP-19 – Chakwal) - PML(N) - Forest, Fisheries, Wildlife and Tourism
- Mian Meraj Din (PP-120 – Lahore) - PML(N)- Excise & Taxation
- Ijaz Ahmed Sheikh (PP-102 – Sialkot) - PML(N) - Labour and Manpower
- Muhammad Arshad Khan Lodhi (PP-182 – Sahiwal) - PML(N) - Industries & Mineral Development
- Muhammad Basharat Raja (PP-4 – Rawalpindi) - PML(N) - Law & Parliamentary Affairs (Additional Charge – Information, Culture and Youth Affairs)
- Pir Syed Muhammad Binyamin Rizvi (PP-99 – Mandi Baha-ud-Din) - PML(N) - Social Welfare, Women Development and Bait-ul-Maal
- Raja Ishfaq Sarwar (PP-8 – Rawalpindi) - PML(N) - Health
- Rana Muhammad Iqbal Khan (PP-149 – Kasur) - PML(N) - Livestock & Dairy Development
- Sahibzada Haji Muhammad Fazal Karim (PP-56 – Faisalabad) - PML(N) -

Auqaf

- Sardar Zulfiqar Ali Khan Khosa (PP-201 – D.G. Khan) - PML(N)- Communication & Works
- Syed Afzaal Ali Shah Gillani (PP-158 – Okara) - PML(N) - Housing & Physical Planning
