= Geneva Accords (1988) =

Agreement that began Soviet withdrawal from Afghanistan

- Signed: 14 April 1988
- Location: Geneva, Switzerland
- Parties: Afghanistan; Pakistan; Soviet Union; United States

The Geneva Accords were the agreements on the settlement of the situation relating to Afghanistan, were signed on 14 April 1988 at the Geneva headquarters of the United Nations, between Afghanistan and Pakistan, with the United States and the Soviet Union serving as guarantors.

The accords consisted of several instruments: a bilateral agreement between the Islamic Republic of Pakistan and the Republic of Afghanistan on the principles of mutual relations, in particular on non-interference and non-intervention; a declaration on international guarantees, signed by the Soviet Union and the United States; a bilateral agreement between Pakistan and Afghanistan on the voluntary return of Afghan refugees; and an agreement on the interrelationships for the settlement of the situation relating to Afghanistan, signed by Pakistan and Afghanistan and witnessed by the Soviet Union and the United States.

The agreements also contained provisions for the timetable of the withdrawal of Soviet troops from Afghanistan. It officially began on 15 May 1988 and ended by 15 February 1989, thus putting an end to a nine-year-long Soviet occupation and Soviet–Afghan War.

The United States reneged on an agreement it had made, with White House clearance, albeit aloofness, in December 1985 to stop the supply of arms to the mujahideen through Pakistan once the Soviet withdrawal was complete. Mikhail Gorbachev felt betrayed, but the Soviet Union was determined to withdraw and so the accords were supplanted with a contradictory "understanding" that the arms supply would continue.

The Afghan resistance, or mujahideen, were neither party to the negotiations nor to the Geneva accords and so refused to accept the terms of the agreement. As a result, the civil war continued after the completion of the Soviet withdrawal. The Soviet-backed regime of Mohammad Najibullah failed to win popular support, territory, or international recognition but was able to remain in power until 1992, when it collapsed and was overrun by the mujahideen.

== See also ==
- United Nations Good Offices Mission in Afghanistan and Pakistan
- Afghan peace process
- Doha Agreement (2020)
- Peshawar Accord
