= United Nations Security Council Resolution 622 =

UN Security Council Resolution 622
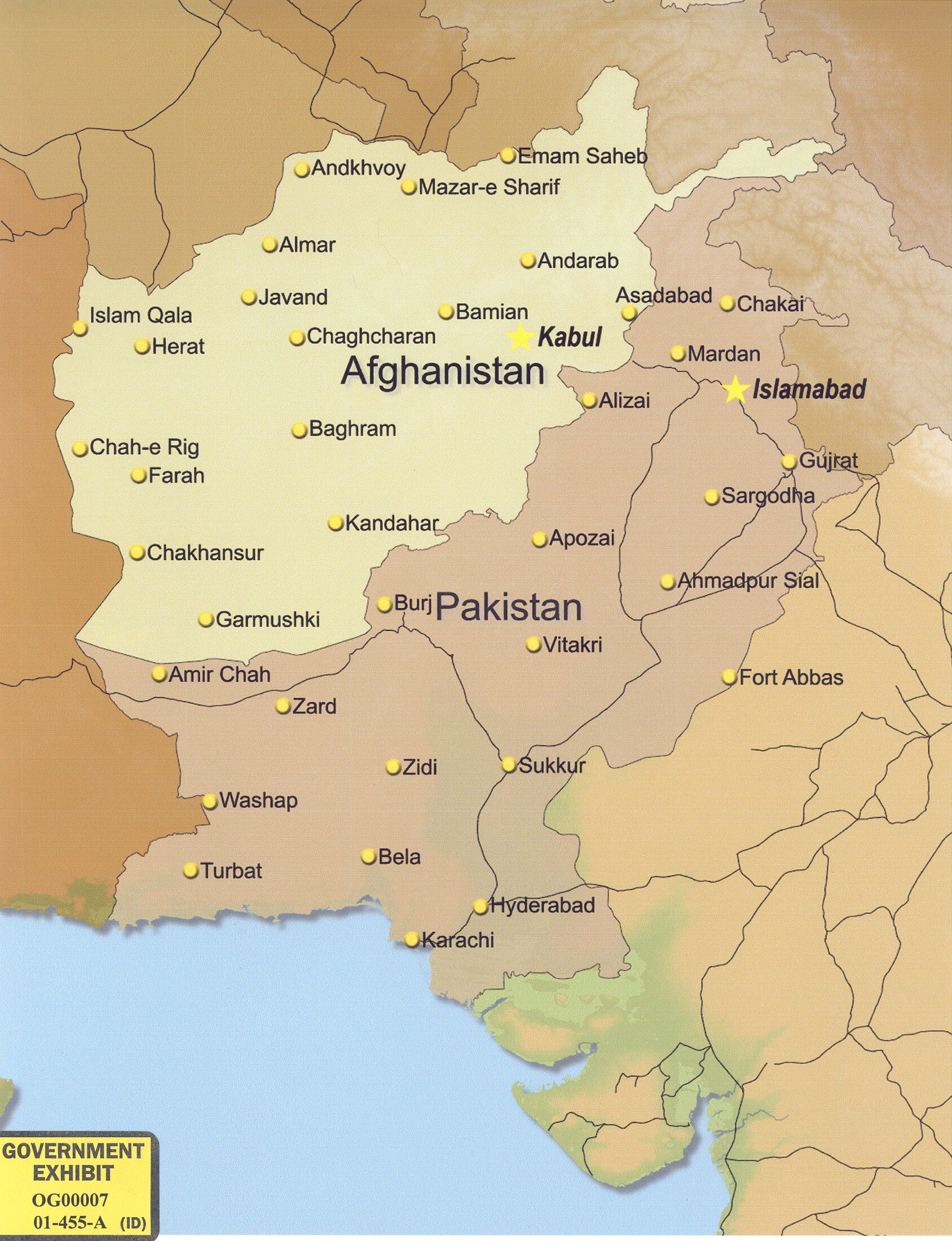
- Afghanistan and Pakistan
- Date: 31 October 1988
- Meeting no.: 2,828
- Code: S/RES/622 (Document)
- Subject: Afghanistan-Pakistan
- Voting summary: 15 voted for; None voted against; None abstained
- Result: Adopted

Security Council composition
- Permanent members: China; France; Soviet Union; United Kingdom; United States
- Non-permanent members: Algeria; Argentina; Brazil; Italy; Japan; Nepal; Senegal; West Germany; Yugoslavia; Zambia

United Nations Security Council resolution 622, adopted unanimously on 20 September 1988, after noting the Geneva Accords agreement signed on 14 April 1988, the Council confirmed the agreement to the measures in the letters of the Secretary-General concerning the settlement of the situation in Afghanistan.

The Council therefore confirmed the establishment of the United Nations Good Offices Mission in Afghanistan and Pakistan in May 1988 and made provisions for a temporary dispatch of 50 military officers to assist in the mission as requested by the Secretary-General. It also required the Secretary-General to keep the Council updated on progress in the region.

== See also ==
- List of United Nations Security Council Resolutions 601 to 700 (1987–1991)
- Soviet–Afghan War
