= Punjab Educational Endowment Fund =

- Company type: Non-Profit Organization for Poor Students of Pakistan
- Founded: 2008
- Founder: Shahbaz Sharif
- Headquarters: Lahore, Pakistan
- Area served: Pakistan
- Key people: Dr. Muhammad Amjad Saqib (Chairman)
- Website: www.peef.org.pk

The Punjab Educational Endowment Fund (PEEF) is a flagship initiative of Government of the Punjab, launched in 2008 under the leadership of then Chief Minister Shahbaz Sharif. Designed to support high-achieving yet financially disadvantaged students, PEEF provides merit and need-based scholarships to enable access to quality education.

To ensure transparency, efficiency, and autonomy in its operations, PEEF is registered under Section 42 of the Companies Act, 2017. The organization was officially incorporated on December 31, 2008, with an initial endowment of PKR 2 billion. Over time, the endowment fund has grown significantly and now exceeds PKR 17 billion. Notably, only the investment proceeds from this fund are used to award scholarships, preserving the principal amount for long-term sustainability.

PEEF’s core mission is to create equal educational opportunities for talented students who lack financial resources. The program aims to uplift underprivileged youth by providing them the means to excel academically and contribute meaningfully to society.

Key Objectives:

♦ Provide scholarships to talented and deserving students, primarily from Punjab, to bridge the gap between privileged and underprivileged youth.

♦ Develop a critical mass of educated and skilled individuals for national development.

♦ Identify and support the most marginalized students through dedicated quotas.

Extend support to high-performing students across Pakistan, including regions like Azad Jammu & Kashmir (AJ&K), Gilgit-Baltistan (GB), FATA (the Merged Districts), and the Islamabad Capital Territory (ICT), as well as students enrolled in PBTE-affiliated institutions.

Since its inception in 2009, PEEF has awarded over 475,000 scholarships, disbursing more than PKR 30.25 billion to empower the youth through education.

== Head office ==
The organization is located in capital of Pakistani Punjab, Lahore, Pakistan following the postal address 33, Civic Centre, Sabzazar; Lahore - 54780

== Members of General Body ==
- Dr. Muhammad Amjad Saqib (Chairman)
- Dr. Muhammad Ajmal Khan (Vice Chairman)
- Muzaffar ul Haq Hashmi (CEO)

== Registration ==
PEEF is registered with:

- Securities and Exchange Commission of Pakistan under Section 42 of Companies Act, 2017
- Federal Board of Revenue under section 10 of Finance Act 2001.
