= Pakistan–Switzerland relations =

- Pakistan: Switzerland

Pakistan and Switzerland maintain a bilateral relationship. Pakistan has an embassy in Bern, whereas Switzerland has embassy in Islamabad and a Consulate-General in Karachi.

== Bilateral agreements ==
Pakistan and Switzerland have signed several agreements, which include an agreement on the reciprocal promotion and protection of investments, the avoidance of double taxation, air traffic, technical and scientific cooperation.

== Economic relations ==
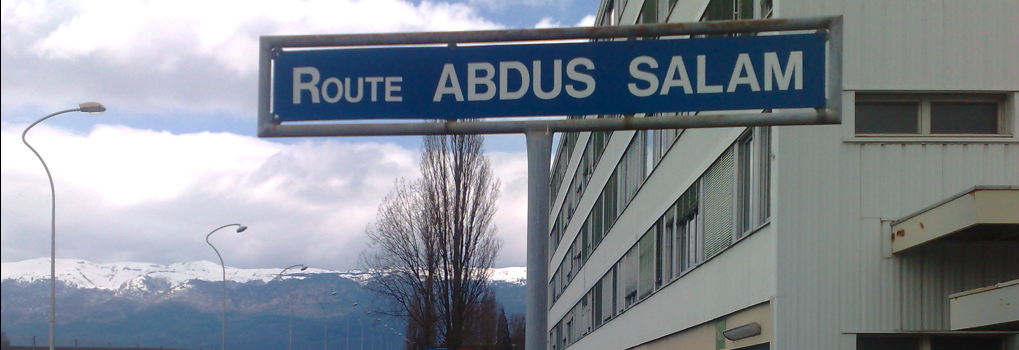
The road named after Pakistani scientist Abdus Salam in CERN, Geneva

Both countries share over six decades of friendship, and have cooperated closely in several fields. Switzerland ranks fifth in terms of foreign direct investment (FDI) in Pakistan and a reliable trading partner, the Swiss-based multinational companies have invested 1.2 billion dollars in Pakistan, in various sectors including food processing, pharmaceuticals, chemicals, machinery and engineering, banking. thus providing jobs for over 10,000 Pakistanis. Recently, the Swiss Business Council has also opened in Karachi. Switzerland has been a keen observer at meetings of the Friends of Pakistan. Currently, there are a small number of Pakistani scientists who work at CERN in Geneva.

== Swiss Pakistanis ==
Pakistanis form one of the largest immigrant communities in Switzerland, numbering about 3,000, living predominantly in Zurich, Basel and Bern.

== Baluchistan posters ==
In September 2017, posters stating "Free Baluchistan" were advertised in parts of Geneva. The posters appeared to be sponsored by Balochistan House, a group of exiled Baloch separatists, with proved ties to the Balochistan Liberation Army (BLA). The BLA is banned as a terrorist organisation by Pakistan, the United Kingdom, United States and others. The posters drew sharp condemnation and rebuke from Islamabad, which summoned the Swiss ambassador to lodge a protest and urged authorities there to investigate the incident, take action against the accomplices, and prevent a recurrence. Pakistan's Permanent Representative to the United Nations in Geneva, Farukh Amil, in a letter to Swiss authorities added that the "use of Swiss soil by terrorists and violent secessionists for nefarious designs against Pakistan and its 200 million people is totally unacceptable" and was a matter of "grave concern".

== See also ==
- Foreign relations of Pakistan
- Foreign relations of Switzerland
- Kidnapping of Swiss tourists in Balochistan
