= Pakistan–Qatar relations =

- Pakistan: Qatar

Diplomatic mission
- Embassy of Pakistan, Doha: Embassy of Qatar, Islamabad

Envoy
- Pakistan Ambassador to Qatar Lt General (R) Muhammad Amir: Ambassador of Qatar to Pakistan Ali bin Mubarak Al Khater

Pakistan–Qatar relations refer to the bilateral links between the Islamic Republic of Pakistan and the State of Qatar. Pakistan has an embassy in Doha; Qatar maintains an embassy in Islamabad and a consulate-general in Karachi. Relations between the two are shaped by Pakistan's generally close relations with the Arab world. Like other nearby gulf states, there is a large Pakistani community in Qatar which numbers over 150 000. They work in diverse fields and send remittances each year. During the 2010 Pakistan floods, Qatar provided timely assistance to the country. After the British left, Pakistan originally called for the territory to be merged into with the Trucial States of the United Arab Emirates, which it had recognized in the same year. Despite this, diplomatic relations between the two were established.

== Economic relations ==
A deal was signed by the two countries' governments in December 2015 in which Qatar agreed to supply Pakistan with $16 billion of LNG over a lengthy period.

Despite the ongoing economic and diplomatic embargo imposed on Qatar, its trade relations with Pakistan remained unaffected. In 2018, trade between the two countries flourished and grew over 230 percent to $2.6 billion.

In June 2019, Qatar announced to invest $3 billion in Pakistan, in the form of deposits and direct investments. The economic partnership between both the countries is expected to reach $9 billion once the investment is done.

In 2021, the Qatari government announced conditional arrival visas for Pakistani nationals. A number of prerequisites that matched the one month arrival visa retirements allows Pakistani citizens entry to Qatar on arrival visas.

=== Participation at 2022 World Cup ===
In 2022, the Pakistani government announced its agreement with the royal family of Qatar for the possible hiring and deployment of Pakistan Army troops to provide security for the 2022 World Cup.

There was widely news reported labour abuse in the construction of the stadium and no workers rights many in other countries.

== COVID-19 pandemic ==
During the COVID-19 pandemic, Qatar provided urgent medical assistance to Pakistan including testing kits, oxygen devices and food.

== Event of the Arab countries cutting ties ==
On 5 June 2017, 5 Arab countries: Saudi Arabia, Egypt, Yemen, UAE and Bahrain cut ties with Qatar. Pakistan has stated that "At the moment there is nothing on Qatar issue, (we) will issue a statement if some development takes place," -Nafees Zakaria, spokesman of Pakistan's Foreign Ministry. Pakistan was unsure who to support in the issue.

== 2022 Pakistan floods ==
After the 2022 Pakistan floods, Qatar established an air bridge with the Qatari Emiri Air Force and sent urgent aid to Pakistan including food, tents and hygiene kits.

== Resident diplomatic missions ==
- Pakistan has an embassy in Doha.
- Qatar has an embassy in Islamabad and a consulate-general in Karachi.

== See also ==
- Foreign relations of Pakistan
- Foreign relations of Qatar
- Pakistanis in Qatar
