= United Nations Good Offices Mission in Afghanistan and Pakistan =

United Nations Good Offices Mission in Afghanistan and Pakistan (UNGOMAP) was established in May 1988, during the Soviet–Afghan War, to assist in ensuring the implementation of the agreements on the settlement of the situation relating to Afghanistan and investigate and report possible violations of any of the provisions of the agreements. The United Nations Security Council confirmed its establishment in Resolution 622 (1988).

By 15 August 1988, the Soviet military withdrew nearly 50 percent of its troops (some 50,000 men) from Afghanistan, evacuating 10 main garrisons and handing them over to the Afghan armed forces. Another 8 garrisons remained under Soviet control until the end of the pullout on 15 February 1989.

UNGOMAP received numerous complaints from both Afghanistan and Pakistan of alleged violations of the Geneva Accords. Afghanistan alleged political activities and propaganda hostile to the Government of Afghanistan taking place in Pakistan, border crossings of men and materiel from Pakistan to Afghanistan, cross-border firings, acts of sabotage, rocket attacks on major urban centres, violations of Afghan airspace by Pakistan aircraft, the continued presence in Pakistan of training camps and arms depots for Afghan opposition groups, and direct involvement by Pakistan military personnel inside Afghanistan, as well as restrictions placed on refugees who wished to return to Afghanistan. Pakistan's complaints included allegations of political activities and propaganda hostile to the Government of Pakistan, bombings and violations of its airspace by Afghan aircraft, acts of sabotage and cross-border firings, including the use of SCUD missiles against Pakistan territory.

UNGOMAP made every effort to investigate complaints lodged by the two parties. However, a number of difficulties hampered the effectiveness of the work of the Mission's inspection teams. These included the rough nature of the terrain, the time which lapsed before many of the alleged incidents were reported, and the security conditions prevailing in the area of operation.

UNGOMAP also maintained close cooperation with the United Nations High Commissioner for Refugees (UNHCR). In particular, it was ready to monitor the situation inside Afghanistan and inform UNHCR of the safety conditions necessary for the return and resettlement of refugees. Up to 5 million refugees were estimated to be living in Pakistan and Iran. However, because the fighting in Afghanistan continued, conditions remained unstable and only a limited number of refugees returned to Afghanistan.

UNGOMAP's mandate formally ended on 15 March 1990.
