= List of members of the 12th National Assembly of Pakistan =

12th National Assembly
←	11th National Assembly	13th National Assembly	→
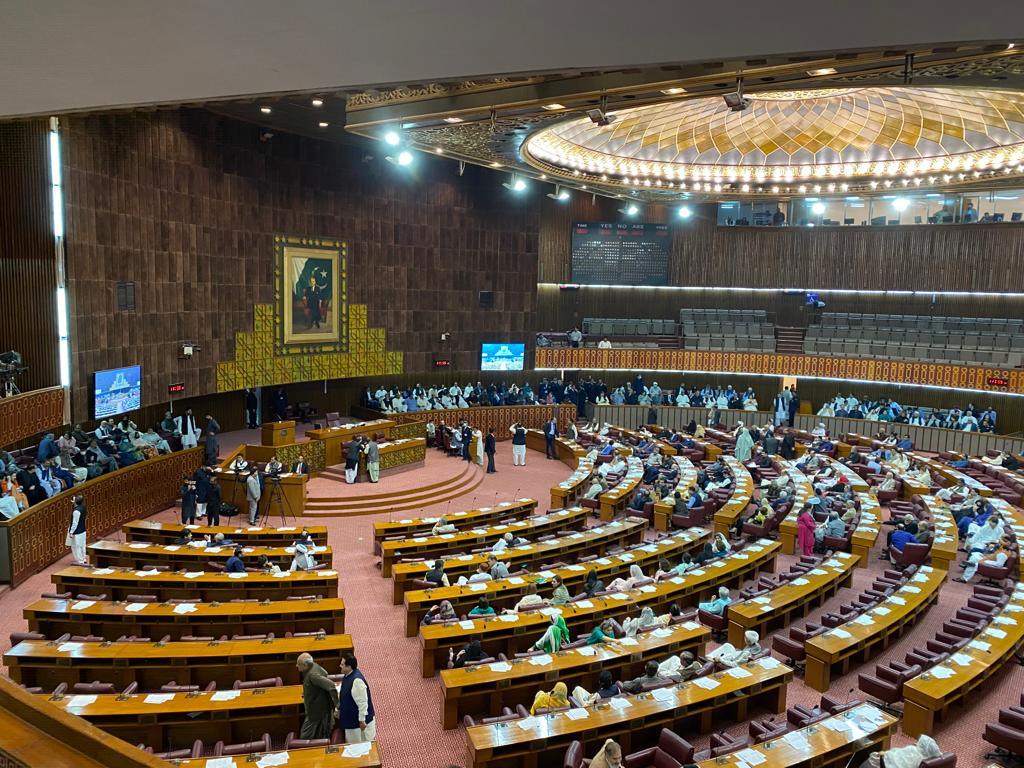

Overview
- Legislative body: National Assembly of Pakistan
- Jurisdiction: Pakistan
- Meeting place: Parliament House, Islamabad-44030
- Term: 2002 – 2007
- Election: 2002 Pakistani general election
- Government: Government of Pakistan
- Website: Official website

National Assembly of Pakistan
- Members: 342
- Speaker: Chaudhry Amir Hussain
- Prime Minister: Zafarullah Khan Jamali; Shujaat Hussain; Shaukat Aziz
- Leader of the Opposition: Fazal-ur-Rehman
- President: Pervez Musharraf

The 12th Parliament of Pakistan was the unicameral legislature of Pakistan formed after the 11th Parliament of Pakistan. There were 342 Members of Parliament, including 56 for Women and 10 for Minorities.

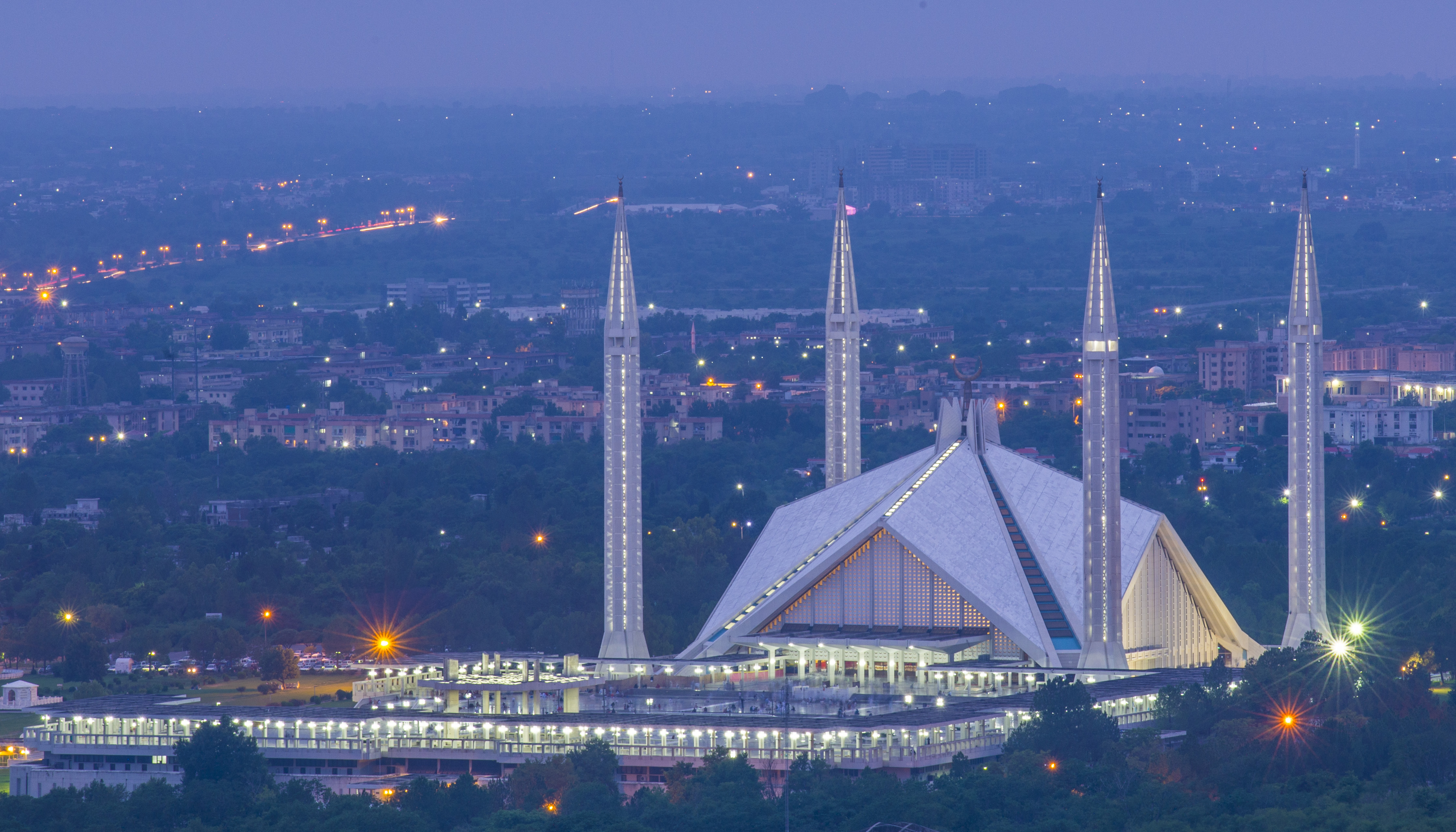
Islamabad

== Khyber Pakhtunkhwa ==
1. Shabbir Ahmed Khan
2. Maulana Rehmatullah Khalil
3. Qari Fayaz-ur-Rehman Alvi
4. Shabir Hussain Awan
5. Qazi Hussain Ahmed
6. Maulana Hamidul-Haq Haqqani
7. Maulana Muhammad Gohar Shah
8. Aftab Ahmad Khan Sherpao
9. Maulana Shujaul-Mulk
10. Moulana Mohammad Qasim
11. Ata-ur-Rahman
12. Muhammad Usman
13. Maulana Khalil Ahmad
14. Mufti Ibrar Sultan
15. Maulana Shah Abdul Aziz
16. Akhunzada Muhammad Sadiq
17. Amanullah Khan Jadoon
18. Sardar Muhammad Yaqub
19. Omar Ayub
20. Sardar Shah Jahan Yousaf
21. Maulana Abdul Malik
22. Qari Muhammad Yousaf
23. Maulvi Abdul Halim Khan
24. Maulana Fazalur-Rehman
25. Atta-ur-Rehman
26. Maulana Syed Nasib Ali Shah
27. Maulana Amanullah Khan
28. Sher Akbar Khan
29. Qari Abdul Bais Siddiqui
30. Fazle Subhan
31. Amir Muqam
32. Maulana Abdul Akbar Chitrali
33. Maulana Asadullah
34. Maulana Ahmad Ghafoor

== FATA ==
1. Maulana Ghulam Muhammad Sadiq
2. Syed Javed Hussain
3. Munir Khan Orakzai
4. Syed Ghazi Gulab Jamal
5. Maulana Syed Nek Zaman
6. Maulana Abdul Malik Wazir
7. Maulana Mohammad Merajuddin
8. Sheikh Alhadees Maulana Muhammad Sadiq
9. Sahibzada Haroon Rashid
10. Muhammad Noor- ul-Haq Qadri
11. Maulana Khalilur-Rehman Afridi
12. Naseem Gul Afridi

== Islamabad ==
1. Mian Muhammad Aslam
2. Syed Nayyar Hussain Bokhari

== Punjab ==
1. Ghulam Murtaza Satti
2. Raja Pervez Ashraf
3. Nisar Ali Khan
4. Ghulam Sarwar Khan
5. Zammurd Khan
6. Sheikh Rashid Ahmed
7. Muhammad Hanif Abbasi
8. Malik Amin Aslam Khan
9. Malik Allah Yar Khan
10. Shaukat Aziz
11. Tahir Iqbal
12. Muhammad Faez Tamman
13. Ch. Shahbaz Hussain
14. Raja Muhammad Asad Khan
15. Inam ul Haq Piracha
16. Ch. Ghias Ahmed Mela
17. Tasneem Ahmed Qureshi
18. Anwar Ali Cheema
19. Mazhar Ahmed Qureshi
20. Sumaira Malik
21. Malik Muhammad Saifullah Tiwana
22. Imran Khan
23. Sher Afghan Khan Niazi
24. Muhammad Sanaullah Khan Mastikhel
25. Rashid Akbar Khan
26. Ghulam Rasool Sahi
27. Muhammad Wasi Zafar
28. Muhammad Asim Nazir
29. Rajab Ali Khan Baloch
30. Rana Asif Tauseef
31. Nisar Ahmed
32. Muhammad Fazal Karim
33. Mushtaaq Ali Cheema
34. Abid Sher Ali
35. Raja Nadir Pervaiz Khan
36. Muhammad Tahir Shah
37. Ghulam Bibi Bharwana
38. Faisal Saleh Hayat
39. Sheikh Waqqas Akram
40. Saima Akhtar Bharwana
41. Muhammad Mehboob Sultan
42. Amjad Ali Warriach
43. Mian Muhammad Farhan Latif
44. Riaz Fatyana
45. Ch. Imranullah
46. Qazi Hamidullah Khan
47. Shahid Akram Bhinder
48. Imtiaz Safdar Warriach
49. Rana Omer Nazir Ahmed Khan
50. Ch. Ahmad Raza
51. Ch. Bilal Ejaz
52. Hamid Nasir Chattha
53. Mehdi Hassan Bhatti
54. Ch. Liaqat Abbas
55. Ch. Wajahat Hussain
56. Ch. Shujaat Hussain
57. Qamar Zaman Kaira
58. Rehman Naseer Chaudhry
59. Aijaz Ahmed Chaudhry
60. Zulfiqar Ali Gondal
61. Khawaja Muhammad Asif
62. Ch. Amir Hussain
63. Umar Ahmad Ghuman
64. Ali Asjid Malhi
65. Zahid Hamid
66. Muhammad Nasir Khan
67. Danial Aziz Chaudhry
68. Riffat Javaid Kahlon
69. Hafiz Salman Butt
70. Khawaja Saad Rafique
71. Mohammad Pervaiz Malik
72. Farid Ahmad Paracha
73. Sardar Ayaz Sadiq
74. Muhammad Javed Hashmi
75. Aitzaz Ahsan
76. Hamayun Akhtar Khan
77. Liaqat Baloch
78. Tahir-ul-Qadri
79. Zaheer Abbas Khokhar
80. Habibullah Warraich
81. Samina Khalid Ghurki
82. Zulfiqar Ahmed Dhillon
83. Mian Jalil Ahmad
84. Muhammad Saeed Virk
85. Khurram Munawar Manj
86. Mian Shamim Haider
87. Bilal Ahmed Virk
88. Rai Mansab Ali Khan
89. Sardar Tufail Ahmed Khan
90. Ch. Manzoor Ahmed
91. Mian Khursheed Mahmud Kasuri
92. Sardar Muhammad Asif Nakai
93. Sardar Talib Hassan Nakai
94. Rai Muhammad Aslam Kharal
95. Rao Sikandar Iqbal
96. Syed Gulzar Sibtain Shah
97. Rao Muhammad Ajmal Khan
98. Rubina Shaheen Wattoo
99. Shah Mahmood Qureshi
100. Malik Liaquat Ali Dogar
101. Rana Mahmoodul-Hassan
102. Sikandar Hayat Khan Bosan
103. Syed Asad Murtaza Gillani
104. Syed Jafar Hussain Bukhari
105. Nawab Aman Ullah Khan
106. Muhammad Akhtar Khan Kanju
107. Muhammad Raza Hayat Hiraj
108. Hamid Yar Hiraj
109. Pir Muhammad Aslam Bodla
110. Ghulam Murtaza Maitla
111. Ch. Nouraiz Shakoor Khan
112. Rana Tariq Javed
113. Rai Aziz Ullah Khan
114. Saeed Ahmed Chaudhry
115. Pir Muhammad Shah Khaggah
116. Ahmed Raza Maneka
117. Junaid Mumtaz Joya
118. Ch. Nazir Ahmed Jatt
119. Ishaq Khan Khakwani
120. Aftab Ahmed Khan Khiachi
121. Azhar Ahmed Khan
122. Khawaja Sheraz Mahmood
123. Sardar Farooq Ahmed Khan
124. Awais Ahmad Khan
125. Sardar Muhammad Jaffar Khan
126. Muhammad Nasrullah Khan
127. Khalida Mohsin Ali Qureshi
128. Hina Rabbani Khar
129. Muhammad Shahid Jamil Qureshi
130. Makhdumzada Basti Bokhari
131. Abdul Qayyum Khan Jatoi
132. Sardar Bahadur Ahmed Khan
133. Malik Niaz Ahmed Jakhar
134. Makhdoom Syed Ali Hassan Gilani
135. Aamir Yar Malik
136. Muhammad Farooq Azam Malik
137. Riaz Hussain Pirzada
138. Syed Tasneem Nawaz Gardezi
139. Syed Muhammad Asghar Shah
140. Mian Mumtaz Matyana
141. Tahir Bashir Cheema
142. Muhammad Ijaz- ul-Haq
143. Syed Ahmad Alam Anwar
144. Tanvir Hussain Syed
145. Makhdoom Khusro Bakhtyar
146. Jehangir Khan Tareen
147. Zafar Iqbal Warraich
148. Rais Munir Ahmed
149. Muhammad Aftab

== Sindh ==
1. Khurshid Shah
2. Abdul Mujeeb Pirzada
3. Khalid Ahmed Khan Lund
4. Ali Nawaz Mahar
5. Muhammad Ibrahim Jatoi
6. Ghous Bux Khan Mahar
7. Muhammad Anwar Bughio
8. Hizbullah Bughio
9. Khalid Iqbal Memon
10. Shahid Hussain Bhutto
11. Aijaz Hussain Jakhrani
12. Hazar Khan Bijarani
13. Salim Jan Khan Mazari
14. Abdul Ghaffar Khan Jatoi
15. Syed Zafar Ali Shah
16. Azra Fazal Pechuho
17. Syed Ghulam Mustafa Shah
18. Manzoor Wassan
19. Syed Javed Ali Shah Jillani
20. Fazal Ali Shah
21. Makhdoom Amin Fahim
22. Khalid Wahab
23. Abul Khair Mohammad Zubair
24. Syed Amir Ali Shah Jamote
25. Naveed Qamar
26. Shamshad Sattar Bachani
27. Ghulam Ali Nizamani
28. Fahmida Mirza
29. Aftab Hussain Shah Jillani
30. Syed Qurban Ali Shah
31. Nawab Muhammad Yousuf
32. Arbab Zakaullah
33. Ghulam Hyder Samejo
34. Abdul Ghani Talpur
35. Rafiq Ahmed Jamali
36. Liaquat Ali Jatoi
37. Khuda Bux Nizamani
38. Abdul Quddus Rajar
39. Liaquat Ali Marri
40. Syed Ayaz Ali Shah Sheerazi
41. Muhammad Ali Malkani
42. Hakim Qari Gul Rehman
43. Abid Ali Umang
44. Laeeque Khan
45. Abdul Kadir Khanzada
46. Abdul Waseem
47. Haider Abbas Rizvi
48. Kunwar Khalid Yunus
49. Nisar Ahmed Panhwar
50. Israr- ul-Ebad Khan
51. Nabil Gabol
52. Aamir Liaquat Hussain
53. Abdus Sattar Afghani
54. Syed Safwanullah
55. Muhammad Hussain Mehanti
56. Asadullah Bhutto
57. Nawab Mirza
58. Farooq Sattar
59. Iqbal Muhammad Ali Khan
60. Muhammad Shamim Siddiqui
61. Sher Muhammad Baloch

== Balochistan ==
1. Fazal Ahmed Ghazi
2. Molvi Noor Muhammad
3. Hafiz Hussain Ahmed
4. Gul Muhammad Dummar
5. Mahmood Khan Achakzai
6. Sardar Muhammad Yaqoob Khan Nasir
7. Muhammad Khan Sherani
8. Mir Haider Bughti
9. Mir Zafrullah Khan Jamali
10. Yar Muhammad Rind
11. Abdul Ghafoor Haidri
12. Abdul Rauf Mengal
13. Abdul Qadir Jamaluddin
14. Maulana Rehmatullah Baluch
15. Zobaida Jalal

== Women ==
Region	Constituency	Political party	Member
Punjab	Reserved seats for women	Pakistan Muslim League (Q)	Mehnaz Raffi
Punjab	Reserved seats for women	Pakistan Muslim League (Q)	Hijra Tariq Aziz
Punjab	Reserved seats for women	Pakistan Muslim League (Q)	Tanzila Aamir Cheema
Punjab	Reserved seats for women	Pakistan Muslim League (Q)	Donya Aziz
Punjab	Reserved seats for women	Pakistan Muslim League (Q)	Kashmala Tariq
Punjab	Reserved seats for women	Pakistan Muslim League (Q)	Saira Tariq
Punjab	Reserved seats for women	Pakistan Muslim League (Q)	Riffat Amjad
Punjab	Reserved seats for women	Pakistan Muslim League (Q)	Attiya Inayatullah
Punjab	Reserved seats for women	Pakistan Muslim League (Q)	Bushra Rahman
Punjab	Reserved seats for women	Pakistan Muslim League (Q)	Farzeen Ahmed
Punjab	Reserved seats for women	Pakistan Muslim League (Q)	Shahzadi Umerzadi Tiwana
Punjab	Reserved seats for women	Pakistan Muslim League (Q)	Raheela Yahya Munawar
Punjab	Reserved seats for women	Pakistan Muslim League (Q)	Asiya Azeem
Punjab	Reserved seats for women	Pakistan Muslim League (Q)	Firdous Ashiq Awan
Punjab	Reserved seats for women	Pakistan Muslim League (Q)	Begum Tehmina Dasti
Punjab	Reserved seats for women	Pakistan Muslim League (Q)	Onaza Ehsan
Punjab	Reserved seats for women	Pakistan Muslim League (Q)	Bushra Anwar Sipra
Punjab	Reserved seats for women	Pakistan Muslim League (Q)	Rozina Tufail
Punjab	Reserved seats for women	Pakistan Muslim League (Q)	Tahira Asif
Punjab	Reserved seats for women	Pakistan Peoples Party	Naheed Khan
Punjab	Reserved seats for women	Pakistan Peoples Party	Belum Hasnain
Punjab	Reserved seats for women	Pakistan Peoples Party	Shakeela Khanam Rashid
Punjab	Reserved seats for women	Pakistan Peoples Party	Fouzia Habib
Punjab	Reserved seats for women	Pakistan Peoples Party	Mehreen Anwar Raja
Punjab	Reserved seats for women	Pakistan Peoples Party	Yasmeen Rehman
Punjab	Reserved seats for women	Pakistan Peoples Party	Shahnaz Sheikh
Punjab	Reserved seats for women	Pakistan Peoples Party	Rukhsana Bangash
Punjab	Reserved seats for women	Pakistan Peoples Party	Nasim Akhtar
Punjab	Reserved seats for women	Muttahida Majlis-e-Amal	Samia Raheel Qazi
Punjab	Reserved seats for women	Pakistan Muslim League (N)	Mamoona Hashmi
Punjab	Reserved seats for women	Pakistan Muslim League (N)	Begum Ishrat Ashraf
Punjab	Reserved seats for women	Pakistan Muslim League (N)	Tehmina Daultana
Punjab	Reserved seats for women	Pakistan Muslim League (J)	Begum Rehana Aleem
Punjab	Reserved seats for women		Meena Ehsan Leghari
Punjab	Reserved seats for women		Ayla Malik
Sindh	Reserved seats for women	Pakistan Muslim League (Q)	Faiza Junejo
Sindh	Reserved seats for women	Pakistan Peoples Party	Sherry Rehman
Sindh	Reserved seats for women	Pakistan Peoples Party	Ruqia Khanum Soomro
Sindh	Reserved seats for women	Pakistan Peoples Party	Fauzia Wahab
Sindh	Reserved seats for women	Pakistan Peoples Party	Rubina Saddat Qaimkhani
Sindh	Reserved seats for women	Pakistan Peoples Party	Nafisa Munawar
Sindh	Reserved seats for women	Pakistan Peoples Party	Shagufta Jumani
Sindh	Reserved seats for women	Muttahida Majlis-e-Amal	Farida Ahmed
Sindh	Reserved seats for women	Muttahida Majlis-e-Amal	Aisha Munawar
Sindh	Reserved seats for women	Muttahida Qaumi Movement	Shamim Akhtar
Sindh	Reserved seats for women	Muttahida Qaumi Movement	Afsar Begum
Sindh	Reserved seats for women	Muttahida Qaumi Movement	Shabina Talat
Sindh	Reserved seats for women		Gul-e-Farkhanda
Sindh	Reserved seats for women	Pakistan Muslim League (F)	Madam Khurshid Afghan
Khyber Pakhtunkhwa	Reserved seats for women	Pakistan Muslim League (Q)	Zeb Gohar Ayub
Khyber Pakhtunkhwa	Reserved seats for women	Muttahida Majlis-e-Amal	Sayyeda Farhana Khalid Banoori
Khyber Pakhtunkhwa	Reserved seats for women	Muttahida Majlis-e-Amal	Razia Aziz
Khyber Pakhtunkhwa	Reserved seats for women	Muttahida Majlis-e-Amal	Nayyer Sultana
Khyber Pakhtunkhwa	Reserved seats for women	Muttahida Majlis-e-Amal	Jamila Ahmed
Khyber Pakhtunkhwa	Reserved seats for women	Muttahida Majlis-e-Amal	Ambareen Naeem
Khyber Pakhtunkhwa	Reserved seats for women	Muttahida Majlis-e-Amal	Inayat Begum
Khyber Pakhtunkhwa	Reserved seats for women	Muttahida Majlis-e-Amal	Shahida Akhtar Ali
Balochistan	Reserved seats for women	Pakistan Muslim League (Q)	Noor Jehan Panezai
Balochistan	Reserved seats for women	Muttahida Majlis-e-Amal	Imrana Khawar
Balochistan	Reserved seats for women	Muttahida Majlis-e-Amal	Bilqees Saif

== Minorities ==
1. Akram Masih Gill
2. Ch. Haroon Qaiser
3. Gayan Chand Singh
4. M.P. Bhandara
5. Mushtaq Victor
6. Ramesh Lal
7. Pervaiz Masih
8. Asiya Nasir
9. Krishan Bheel
10. Dev Das

== See also ==
- List of members of the 1st National Assembly of Pakistan
- List of members of the 2nd National Assembly of Pakistan
- List of members of the 3rd National Assembly of Pakistan
- List of members of the 4th National Assembly of Pakistan
- List of members of the 5th National Assembly of Pakistan
- List of members of the 6th National Assembly of Pakistan
- List of members of the 7th National Assembly of Pakistan
- List of members of the 8th National Assembly of Pakistan
- List of members of the 9th National Assembly of Pakistan
- List of members of the 10th National Assembly of Pakistan
- List of members of the 11th National Assembly of Pakistan
- List of members of the 12th National Assembly of Pakistan
- List of members of the 13th National Assembly of Pakistan
- List of members of the 14th National Assembly of Pakistan
- List of members of the 15th National Assembly of Pakistan
