= List of members of the 10th National Assembly of Pakistan =

10th National Assembly
| ← | 9th National Assembly | 11th National Assembly | → |
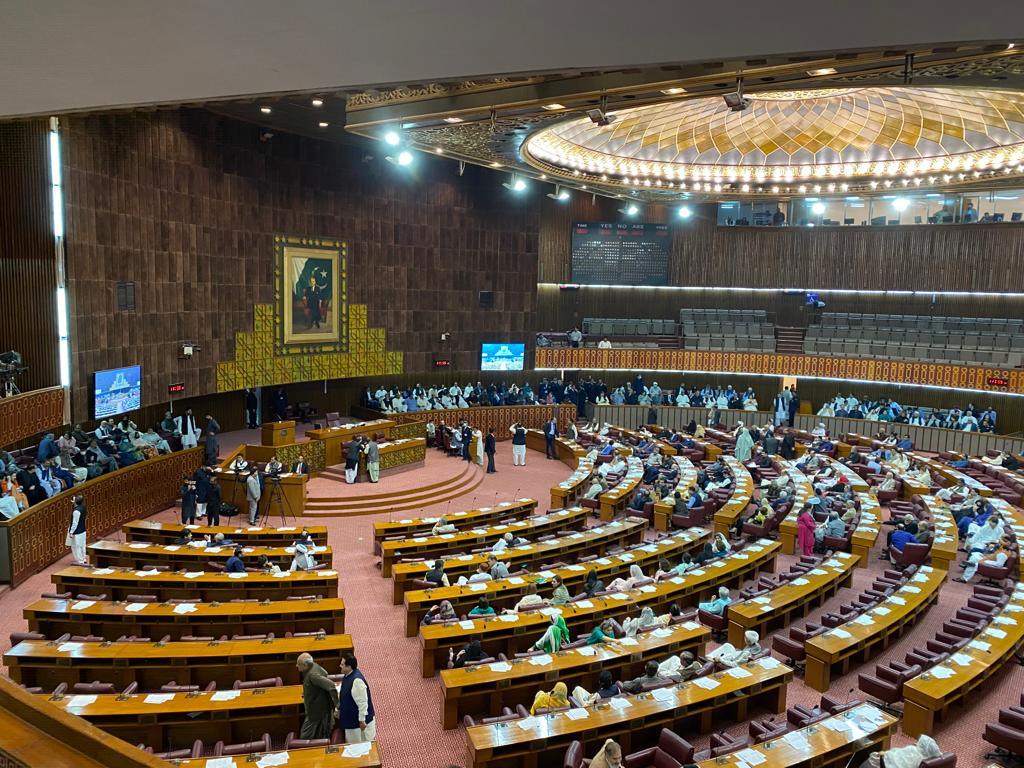

Overview
- Legislative body: National Assembly of Pakistan
- Jurisdiction: Pakistan
- Meeting place: Parliament House, Islamabad-44030
- Term: 1993 – 1996
- Election: 1993 Pakistani general election
- Government: Government of Pakistan
- Website: Official website

National Assembly of Pakistan
- Members: 217
- Speaker: Yusuf Raza Gilani
- Prime Minister: Benazir Bhutto
- Leader of the Opposition: Nawaz Sharif
- President: Farooq Leghari

| Party | Seats | Party | Seats |
| PML (N) | 73 | PML(J) | 6 |
| PPP | 89 | IJM | 4 |
| ANP | 3 | PIF | 3 |
| MDM | 2 | PMAP | 3 |
| JWP | 2 | NDA | 1 |
| PKQP | 1 | BNM(H) | 1 |
| NPP | 1 | BNM(M) | 1 |
| IND | 16 | Minority | 10 |
| Others | 0 | Vacant | 1 |
| Total = 217 | | | |

The 10th National Assembly of Pakistan was the legislature of Pakistan following the 1993 general election of members of parliament (MPs) or Member of the National Assembly of Pakistan (MNA) to the National Assembly of Pakistan, the lower house of the bicameral Majlis-e-Shura.

For 10th National Assembly, Pakistan held general elections to choose the members of the National Assembly on October 6, 1993. Elections were held following the resignations of President Ghulam Ishaq Khan and Prime Minister Nawaz Sharif in order to end a power conflict. Moeenuddin Ahmad Qureshi's caretaker administration oversaw the elections. The Pakistan Peoples Party (PPP) won the most seats despite receiving more votes than the Pakistan Muslim League (N) (PML (N)). Benazir Bhutto was elected to a second non-consecutive term as prime minister after gaining the support of small parties and independents and voter turnout was 40%.

After formation of government, the 10th National Assembly of Pakistan elected Syed Yousaf Raza Gillani for the Speaker of National Assembly of Pakistan from 17 October 1993 to 6 February 1997. On October 19, 1993, Mohtarma Benizar Bhutto took the oath of office as Pakistan's prime minister and on November 5, 1996, President Farooq Ahmad Khan Laghari dissolved the assembly on charges of economic mismanagement, corruption, failure on the law-and-order.

== Members ==
Note: The election constituencies from the general election of 1993 are listed below, they do not link to the most recent election constituencies because they have been completely altered.

| Region | Constituency | Member | Political party | Assumed office | Ref |
|---|---|---|---|---|---|
| KPK | NA-1 (Peshawar-I) | Zafar Ali Shah | PPP | 15 October 1993 | |
| KPK | NA-2 (Peshawar-II) | Arbab M. Jahangir Khan | PPP | 15 October 1993 | |
| KPK | NA-3 (Peshawar-III) | Arbab M. Zahir | ANP | 15 October 1993 | |
| KPK | NA-4 (Peshawar-IV) | Nasirullah Khan Babar | PPP | 15 October 1993 | |
| KPK | NA-5 (Charsadda) | Asfand Yar Wali | ANP | 15 October 1993 | |
| KPK | NA-6 (Mardan-I) | Khanzada Khan | PPP | 15 October 1993 | |
| KPK | NA-7 (Mardan-II) | Haji M. Yaqoob | PPP | 15 October 1993 | |
| KPK | NA-8 (Swabi) | Qazi Maulana Fazlullah | IJM | 15 October 1993 | |
| KPK | NA-9 (Kohat) | Syed Iftikhar Hussain Gillani | PML (N) | 15 October 1993 | |
| KPK | NA-10 (Karak) | Maulana Shaheed Ahmed | MDM | 15 October 1993 | |
| KPK | NA-11 (Abbottabad-I) | Sardar Mahtab Ahmed Khan | PML (N) | 15 October 1993 | |
| KPK | NA-12 (Abbottabad-II) | Mian M. Nawaz Sharif | PML (N) | 15 October 1993 | |
| KPK | NA-13 (Abbottabad-III) | Gohar Ayub Khan | PML (N) | 15 October 1993 | |
| KPK | NA-14 (Mansehra-I) | Sardar M. Yousuf | PML (N) | 15 October 1993 | |
| KPK | NA-15 (Mansehra-II) | Nawabzada Salahuddin Saeed | PML (N) | 15 October 1993 | |
| KPK | NA-16 (Mansehra-III) | M. Nawaz Khan Allai | PML (N) | 15 October 1993 | |
| KPK | NA-17 (Kohistan) | Malik Said Ahmed | Independent | 15 October 1993 | |
| KPK | NA-18 (Dera Ismail Khan) | Maulana Fazlur Rehman | IJM | 15 October 1993 | |
| KPK | NA-19 (Bannu-I) | Syed Abbas Shah | PML (N) | 15 October 1993 | |
| KPK | NA-20 (Bannu-II) | Haji M. Kabir Khan | PML (N) | 15 October 1993 | |
| KPK | NA-21 (Swat-I) | Mian Gul Aurangzeb | PML (N) | 15 October 1993 | |
| KPK | NA-22 (Swat-II) | M. Afzal Khan | PKQP | 15 October 1993 | |
| KPK | NA-23 (Swat-III) | Abdul Mateen Khan | ANP | 15 October 1993 | |
| KPK | NA-24 (Chitral) | Maulana Abdul Rahim | PIF | 15 October 1993 | |
| KPK | NA-25 (Dir) | Sahibzada Fatehullah | PIF | 15 October 1993 | |
| KPK | NA-26 (Malakand) | Malik Muzafar Khan | PPP | 15 October 1993 | |
| KPK | NA-27 (FATA-I) | Haji Baroz Khan | Independent | 15 October 1993 | |
| KPK | NA-28 (FATA-II) | Malik Zulfiqar Ali Chamkani | Independent | 15 October 1993 | |
| KPK | NA-29 (FATA-III) | Al-Haj M. Afzal | Independent | 15 October 1993 | |
| KPK | NA-30 (FATA-IV) | Haji Arsala Khan | Independent | 15 October 1993 | |
| KPK | NA-31 (FATA-V) | Abdul Qayyum Khan | Independent | 15 October 1993 | |
| KPK | NA-32 (FATA-VI) | Bismillah Khan | Independent | 15 October 1993 | |
| KPK | NA-33 (FATA-VII) | Haji M. Shah Afridi | Independent | 15 October 1993 | |
| KPK | NA-34 (FATA-VIII) | Malik M. Aslam Khan Afridi | Independent | 15 October 1993 | |
| Islamabad | NA-35 (Islamabad-I) | M. Nawaz Khokhar | PML (N) | 15 October 1993 | |
| Punjab | NA-36 (Rawalpindi-I) | Shahid Khaqan Abbassi | PML (N) | 15 October 1993 | |
| Punjab | NA-37 (Rawalpindi-II) | * Ch. M. Riaz (Note: Vacated the seat.) | PML (N) | 15 October 1993 | |
| Punjab | NA-38 (Rawalpindi-III) | Shaikh Rasheed Ahmed | PML (N) | 15 October 1993 | |
| Punjab | NA-39 (Rawalpindi-IV) | Muhammad Ijaz-ul-Haq | PML (N) | 15 October 1993 | |
| Punjab | NA-40 (Rawalpindi-V) | Nisar Ali Khan | PML (N) | 15 October 1993 | |
| Punjab | NA-41 (Attock-I) | Shaikh Aftab Ahmed | PML (N) | 15 October 1993 | |
| Punjab | NA-42 (Attock-II) | Malik Lal Khan | PML (N) | 15 October 1993 | |
| Punjab | NA-43 (Chakwal-I) | Lt. Gen. (R) Malik Abdul Majeed | PML (N) | 15 October 1993 | |
| Punjab | NA-44 (Chakwal-II) | Sardar Mumtaz Khan Tamman | PPP | 15 October 1993 | |
| Punjab | NA-45 (Jhelum-I) | Raja Muhammad Afzal Khan | PML (N) | 15 October 1993 | |
| Punjab | NA-46 (Jhelum-II) | Nawabzada Iqbal Mehdi | PML (N) | 15 October 1993 | |
| Punjab | NA-47 (Sargodha-I) | Ghulam Hussain Cheema | PML (N) | 15 October 1993 | |
| Punjab | NA-48 (Sargodha-II) | Liaqat Hayat Badrana | PPP | 15 October 1993 | |
| Punjab | NA-49 (Sargodha-III) | Mahar Ahmed Zia-ur-Rehman Lak | PML (N) | 15 October 1993 | |
| Punjab | NA-50 (Sargodha-IV) | Anwar Ali Cheema | PML (N) | 15 October 1993 | |
| Punjab | NA-51 (Khushab-I) | M. Naeem Khan | PML (N) | 15 October 1993 | |
| Punjab | NA-52 (Khushab-II) | Sardar Shuja M. Khan Baloch | PML (N) | 15 October 1993 | |
| Punjab | NA-53 (Mianwali-I) | Obaid-ullah Khan Shadi Khel | Independent | 15 October 1993 | |
| Punjab | NA-54 (Mianwali-II) | Dr. Sher Afgan Khan Niazi | IND | 15 October 1993 | |
| Punjab | NA-55 (Bhakkar-I) | M. Zafar-ullah Khan | PML(N) | 15 October 1993 | |
| Punjab | NA-56 (Bhakkar-II) | Rashid Akbar Khan | Independent | 15 October 1993 | |
| Punjab | NA-57 (Faisalabad-I) | Rana Zahid Tuseef | PML (N) | 15 October 1993 | |
| Punjab | NA-58 (Faisalabad-II) | Rai Arif Hussain | PPP | 15 October 1993 | |
| Punjab | NA-59 (Faisalabad-III) | Khan Shahadat Ali Khan | PPP | 15 October 1993 | |
| Punjab | NA-60 (Faisalabad-IV) | Shahid Nazir Ahmed | PPP | 15 October 1993 | |
| Punjab | NA-61 (Faisalabad-V) | Ch. Muhammad Ilyas | PPP | 15 October 1993 | |
| Punjab | NA-62 (Faisalabad-VI) | Sardar Dildar Ahmed Cheema | PPP | 15 October 1993 | |
| Punjab | NA-63 (Faisalabad-VII) | Muhammad Akram Ansari | PML (N) | 15 October 1993 | |
| Punjab | NA-64 (Faisalabad-VIII) | Sher Ali | PML (N) | 15 October 1993 | |
| Punjab | NA-65 (Faisalabad-IX) | Mian Amjad Yasin | PML (N) | 15 October 1993 | |
| Punjab | NA-66 (Jhang-I) | Sardarzada Zafar Abbas Syed, | PPP | 15 October 1993 | |
| Punjab | NA-67 (Jhang-II) | Syed Asad Hayat | PPP | 15 October 1993 | |
| Punjab | NA-68 (Jhang-III) | Maulana M. Azam Tariq | MDM | 15 October 1993 | |
| Punjab | NA-69 (Jhang-IV) | Syed Faisal Saleh Hayat | PPP | 15 October 1993 | |
| Punjab | NA-70 (Jhang-V) | Sahibzada M. Nazir Sultan | PPP | 15 October 1993 | |
| Punjab | NA-71 (Toba Tek Singh-I) | Khalid Ahmed Khan Kharl | PPP | 15 October 1993 | |
| Punjab | NA-72 (Toba Tek Singh-II) | Ch. M. Ishfaq | PPP | 15 October 1993 | |
| Punjab | NA-73 (Toba Tek Singh-III) | Mr. Hamza | PML (N) | 15 October 1993 | |
| Punjab | NA-74 (Gujranwala-I) | Hamid Nasir Chatha | PML(J) | 15 October 1993 | |
| Punjab | NA-75 (Gujranwala-II) | Ch. Mehdi Hasan Bhatti | PPP | 15 October 1993 | |
| Punjab | NA-76 (Gujranwala-III) | Ghulam Dastgir Khan | PML (N) | 15 October 1993 | |
| Punjab | NA-77 (Gujranwala-IV) | Brig (R) M.Asghar | PML(J) | 15 October 1993 | |
| Punjab | NA-78 (Gujranwala-V) | Ch. M. Abdullah Virk | PPP | 15 October 1993 | |
| Punjab | NA-79 (Gujranwala-VI) | Ch.Ijaz Ahmed | PML (N) | 15 October 1993 | |
| Punjab | NA-80 (Gujrat-I) | Nawabzada Ghazanfar Ali Gul | PPP | 15 October 1993 | |
| Punjab | NA-81 (Gujrat-II) | Ch. Ahmad Mukhtar | PPP | 15 October 1993 | |
| Punjab | NA-82 (Gujrat-III) | Haji M. Asghar Kaira | PPP | 15 October 1993 | |
| Punjab | NA-83 (Gujrat-IV) | Zafarullah Tarar | PPP | 15 October 1993 | |
| Punjab | NA-84 (Gujrat-V) | Nazar M. Gondal | PPP | 15 October 1993 | |
| Punjab | NA-85 (Sialkot-I) | Khawaja M. Asif | PML (N) | 15 October 1993 | |
| Punjab | NA-86 (Sialkot-II) | Ch. Akhtar Ali Viryo | PML(J) | 15 October 1993 | |
| Punjab | NA-87 (Sialkot-III) | Syed Iftikhar-ul-Hassan Shah | PML (N) | 15 October 1993 | |
| Punjab | NA-88 (Sialkot-IV) | Ch. Abdul Sattar Viryo | PML(J) | 15 October 1993 | |
| Punjab | NA-89 (Sialkot-V) | Ch. M. Sarwar Khan | PML (N) | 15 October 1993 | |
| Punjab | NA-90 (Sialkot-VI) | Ahsan Iqbal | PML (N) | 15 October 1993 | |
| Punjab | NA-91 (Sialkot-VII) | M. Ishfaq Taj | PML(N) | 15 October 1993 | |
| Punjab | NA-92 (Lahore-I) | *Nawaz Sharif (Note: Vacated the seat for By-election.) | PML (N) | 15 October 1993 | |
| Punjab | NA-93 (Lahore-II) | Humayun Akhtar Khan | PML (N) | 15 October 1993 | |
| Punjab | NA-94 (Lahore-III) | Mian Abdul Waheed | PML (N) | 15 October 1993 | |
| Punjab | NA-95 (Lahore-IV) | *Nawaz Sharif | PML (N) | 15 October 1993 | |
| Punjab | NA-96 (Lahore-V) | *Nawaz Sharif | PML (N) | 15 October 1993 | |
| Punjab | NA-97 (Lahore-VI) | Tariq Badar-udDin Bandey | PML (N) | 15 October 1993 | |
| Punjab | NA-98 (Lahore-VII) | Mian M. Munir | PML (N) | 15 October 1993 | |
| Punjab | NA-99 (Lahore-VIII) | Mehr Zulfiqar Ali | PML (N) | 15 October 1993 | |
| Punjab | NA-100 (Lahore-IX) | Ch. Khalid Javed Ghurki | PPP | 15 October 1993 | |
| Punjab | NA-101 (Sheikhupura-I) | Nisar Ahmed Pannoun | PPP | 15 October 1993 | |
| Punjab | NA-102 (Sheikhupura-II) | Haji Munawwar Hussain Manj | PPP | 15 October 1993 | |
| Punjab | NA-103 (Sheikhupura-III) | Ch. M. Barjees Tahir | PML (N) | 15 October 1993 | |
| Punjab | NA-104 (Sheikhupura-IV) | Ch.Tawakkal-ullah Virk | PPP | 15 October 1993 | |
| Punjab | NA-105 (Sheikhupura-V) | Rai Bashir Ahmed Khan Bhatti | PPP | 15 October 1993 | |
| Punjab | NA-106 (Kasur-I) | Sardar Asif Ahmed Ali | PML(J) | 15 October 1993 | |
| Punjab | NA-107 (Kasur-II) | Rao M. Khizar Hayat | PML (N) | 15 October 1993 | |
| Punjab | NA-108 (Kasur-III) | Sardar Talib Hassan | PML (N) | 15 October 1993 | |
| Punjab | NA-109 (Kasur-IV) | Sardar M. Ashiq Dogar | PPP | 15 October 1993 | |
| Punjab | NA-110 (Okara-I) | Rao Sikandar Iqba | PPP | 15 October 1993 | |
| Punjab | NA-111 (Okara-II) | *Shafqat Abbas Rubera | PPP | 15 October 1993 | |
| Punjab | NA-112 (Okara-III) | Rao Qaiser Ali Khan | PML (N) | 15 October 1993 | |
| Punjab | NA-113 (Okara-IV) | Mian M. Yasin Khan Wattoo | PML (N) | 15 October 1993 | |
| Punjab | NA-114 (Multan-I) | Syed Yousuf Raza Gillani | PPP | 15 October 1993 | |
| Punjab | NA-115 (Multan-II) | Haji M. Boota | PML (N) | 15 October 1993 | |
| Punjab | NA-116 (Multan-III) | Shaikh M. Tahir Rasheed | PML (N) | 15 October 1993 | |
| Punjab | NA-117 (Multan-IV) | Rana Mumtaz Ahmed Noon | PPP | 15 October 1993 | |
| Punjab | NA-118 (Multan-V) | Mirza M. Nasir Baig | PPP | 15 October 1993 | |
| Punjab | NA-119 (Multan-VI) | Syed Javaid Ali Shah | PML (N) | 15 October 1993 | |
| Punjab | NA-120 (Khanewal-I) | Shah Mahmood Qureshi | PPP | 15 October 1993 | |
| Punjab | NA-121 (Khanewal-II) | Mehr M. Iqbal Hiraj | PPP | 15 October 1993 | |
| Punjab | NA-122 (Khanewal-III) | Aftab Ahmed Khan Daha | PML (N) | 15 October 1993 | |
| Punjab | NA-123 (Khanewal-IV) | Pir M. Aslam Bodla | PPP | 15 October 1993 | |
| Punjab | NA-124 (Sahiwal-I) | Ch. Nouraiz Shakoor Kha | PPP | 15 October 1993 | |
| Punjab | NA-125 (Sahiwal-II) | Mehr Ghulam Farid Kathia | PPP | 15 October 1993 | |
| Punjab | NA-126 (Sahiwal-III) | Mrs. Shahnaz Javed | PPP | 15 October 1993 | |
| Punjab | NA-127 (Sahiwal-IV) | Mian M. Amjad Joyia | PPP | 15 October 1993 | |
| Punjab | NA-128 (Sahiwal-V) | Rao M. Hashim Khan | PPP | 15 October 1993 | |
| Punjab | NA-129 (Vehari-I) | Noor M. Khan Bhaba | PPP | 15 October 1993 | |
| Punjab | NA-130 (Vehari-II) | Ms. Tehmina Daultana | PML (N) | 15 October 1993 | |
| Punjab | NA-131 (Vehari-III) | Ch. Qurban Ali Chohan | PPP | 15 October 1993 | |
| Punjab | NA-132 (D G Khan-I) | Khawaja Kamalud-Din Anwar | PPP | 15 October 1993 | |
| Punjab | NA-133 (D G Khan-II) | Mansoor Ahmed Khan Leghari | PPP | 15 October 1993 | |
| Punjab | NA-134 (Rajanpur) | Mir Balakh Sher Mazari | Independent | 15 October 1993 | |
| Punjab | NA-135 (Muzaffargarh-I) | Sardar Abdul Qayyum Khan Jatoi | PML (N) | 15 October 1993 | |
| Punjab | NA-136 (Muzaffargarh-II) | Nawabzada Nasrullah Khan | NDA | 15 October 1993 | |
| Punjab | NA-137 (Muzaffargarh-III) | *Malik Ghulam Mustafa Khar | PPP | 15 October 1993 | |
| Punjab | NA-138 (Muzaffargarh-IV) | Malik Ghulam Mustafa Khar | PPP | 15 October 1993 | |
| Punjab | NA-139 (Layyah-I) | Malik Niaz Ahmed Jakhar | PPP | 15 October 1993 | |
| Punjab | NA-140 (Layyah-II) | M. Jahangir Khan | PPP | 15 October 1993 | |
| Punjab | NA-141 (Bahawalpur-I) | Nawab Salahuddin | PML (N) | 15 October 1993 | |
| Punjab | NA-142 (Bahawalpur-II) | Sahibzada Farooq Anwar Abbasi | PML (N) | 15 October 1993 | |
| Punjab | NA-143 (Bahawalpur-III) | Mian Riaz Hussain Pirzada | PPP | 15 October 1993 | |
| Punjab | NA-144 (Bahawalnagar-I) | Mian Abdul Sattar Lalika | PML (N) | 15 October 1993 | |
| Punjab | NA-145 (Bahawalnagar-II) | Mian Mumtaz Ahmed Matiana | PPP | 15 October 1993 | |
| Punjab | NA-146 (Bahawalnagar-III) | Ch. Ali Akbar Wains | PPP | 15 October 1993 | |
| Punjab | NA-147 (Rahim Yar Khan-I) | Makhdoom Ahmed Alam Anwar | PPP | 15 October 1993 | |
| Punjab | NA-148 (Rahim Yar Khan-II) | Makhdoom Shahab-ud-Din | PPP | 15 October 1993 | |
| Punjab | NA-149 (Rahim Yar Khan-III) | Ch. Jaffar Iqbal | PML (N) | 15 October 1993 | |
| Punjab | NA-150 (Rahim Yar Khan-IV) | Makhdoom Ahmed Mehmud | PML (N) | 15 October 1993 | |
| Sindh | NA-151 (Sukkur-I) | Syed Khurshed Ahmed Shah | PPP | 15 October 1993 | |
| Sindh | NA-152 (Sukkur-II) | Ali M. Khan Mahar | PPP | 15 October 1993 | |
| Sindh | NA-153 (Sukkur-III) | Khalid Ahmed Khan Lund | PPP | 15 October 1993 | |
| Sindh | NA-154 (Shikarpur-I) | Aftab Shahban Mirani | PPP | 15 October 1993 | |
| Sindh | NA-155 (Shikarpur-II) | Altaf Ali Bhayo | PPP | 15 October 1993 | |
| Sindh | NA-156 (Jacobabad-I) | Mir Ahmed Nawaz Jakhrani | PPP | 15 October 1993 | |
| Sindh | NA-157 (Jacobabad-I) | Mir Mehran Khan Bijrani | PPP | 15 October 1993 | |
| Sindh | NA-158 (Nawabshah-I) | Ghulam Mustafa Khan Jatoi | NPP | 15 October 1993 | |
| Sindh | NA-159 (Nawabshah-II) | Syed Zafar Ali Shah | PPP | 15 October 1993 | |
| Sindh | NA-160 (Nawabshah-III) | Asif Ali Zardari | PPP | 15 October 1993 | |
| Sindh | NA-161 (Nawabshah-IV) | Hakim Ali Zardari | PPP | 15 October 1993 | |
| Sindh | NA-162 (Khairpur-I) | Manzoor Hussain Wasan | PPP | 15 October 1993 | |
| Sindh | NA-163 (Khairpur-II) | Pir Syed Abdul Qadir Shah Jillani | PPP | 15 October 1993 | |
| Sindh | NA-164 (Larkana-I) | Begum Nusrat Bhutto | PPP | 15 October 1993 | |
| Sindh | NA-165 (Larkana-II) | Shabbir Ahmed Khan Chandio | PPP | 15 October 1993 | |
| Sindh | NA-166 (Larkana-III) | Mrs. Benazir Bhutto | PPP | 15 October 1993 | |
| Sindh | NA-167 (Hyderabad-I) | Makhdoom M. Amin Faheem | PPP | 15 October 1993 | |
| Sindh | NA-168 (Hyderabad-II) | Sahibzada Shabbir Hasan Ansari | PML(N) | 15 October 1993 | |
| Sindh | NA-169 (Hyderabad-III) | Qazi Asad Abid | PPP | 15 October 1993 | |
| Sindh | NA-170 (Hyderabad-IV) | Syed Naveed Qamar | PPP | 15 October 1993 | |
| Sindh | NA-171 (Hyderabad-V) | Abdul Sattar Bachani | PPP | 15 October 1993 | |
| Sindh | NA-172 (Badin-I) | Abdul Sattar Leghari | PPP | 15 October 1993 | |
| Sindh | NA-173 (Badin-II) | Zulfiqar Ali Mirza | PPP | 15 October 1993 | |
| Sindh | NA-174 (Tharparkar-I) | Pir Aftab Hussain Jillani | PPP | 15 October 1993 | |
| Sindh | NA-175 (Tharparkar-II) | Nawab M. Yoursaf Talpur | PPP | 15 October 1993 | |
| Sindh | NA-176 (Tharparkar-III) | Dr. Arbab Ghulam Rahim | PPP | 15 October 1993 | |
| Sindh | NA-177 (Dadu-I) | Malik Asad Sikandar | PPP | 15 October 1993 | |
| Sindh | NA-178 (Dadu-II) | M. Bux Jamali | PPP | 15 October 1993 | |
| Sindh | NA-179 (Dadu-III) | Rafiq Ahmed Mahesar | PPP | 15 October 1993 | |
| Sindh | NA-180 (Sanghar-I) | Haji Khda Bux Rajar | PML(N) | 15 October 1993 | |
| Sindh | NA-181 (Sanghar-II) | Fida Hussain Derro | PPP | 15 October 1993 | |
| Sindh | NA-182 (Thatta-I) | Baboo Ghulam Hussain | PPP | 15 October 1993 | |
| Sindh | NA-183 (Thatta-II) | Syed Shafqat Hussain Shah | Independent | 15 October 1993 | |
| Sindh | NA-184 (Karachi West-I) | Mian Ejaz Ahmed Shafi | PML (N) | 15 October 1993 | |
| Sindh | NA-185 (Karachi West-II) | M. Afaque Khan Shahid | PPP | 15 October 1993 | |
| Sindh | NA-186 (Karachi Central-I) | Dost M. Faizi | PML(N) | 15 October 1993 | |
| Sindh | NA-187 (Karachi Central-II) | Hafiz M. Taqi | PML(N) | 15 October 1993 | |
| Sindh | NA-188 (Karachi Central-III) | Muzaffar Ahmed Hashmi | PIF | 15 October 1993 | |
| Sindh | NA-189 (Karachi South-I) | Waja Ahmed Karim Dad Boluch | PPP | 15 October 1993 | |
| Sindh | NA-190 (Karachi South-II) | Abdul Aziz Memon | PPP | 15 October 1993 | |
| Sindh | NA-191 (Karachi South-III) | Capt. Haleem Ahmed Siddiqui | PML (N) | 15 October 1993 | |
| Sindh | NA-192 (Karachi East-I) | Zuhair Akram Nadeem | PML(N) | 15 October 1993 | |
| Sindh | NA-193 (Karachi East-II) | Abu Bakar Shaikhani | PML(N) | 15 October 1993 | |
| Sindh | NA-194 (Karachi East-III) | Haji Muzafar Ali Shujra | PPP | 15 October 1993 | |
| Sindh | NA-195 (Karachi East-IV) | Prof. N.D. Khan | PPP | 15 October 1993 | |
| Sindh | NA-196 (Karachi East-V) | Sher M. Baluch | PPP | 15 October 1993 | |
| Balochistan | NA-197 (Quetta) | Mehmood Khan Achakzai | PMAP | 15 October 1993 | |
| Balochistan | NA-198 (Pishin) | *Mehmood Khan Achakzai | PMAP | 15 October 1993 | |
| Balochistan | NA-199 (Loralai) | Haji Gul M. Haji Doomar | IJM | 15 October 1993 | |
| Balochistan | NA-200 (Zhob) | Nawab M. Ayyaz Khan Jogezai | PMAP | 15 October 1993 | |
| Balochistan | NA-201 (Kachhi) | Yar Muhammad Rind | JWP | 15 October 1993 | |
| Balochistan | NA-202 (Sibbi, Kohlu, Dera Bugti, Ziarat) | Nawab M. Akbar Khan Bugti | JWP | 15 October 1993 | |
| Balochistan | NA-203 (Jaffarabad) | Mir Faridullah Khan Jamali | Independent | 15 October 1993 | |
| Balochistan | NA-204 (Kalat, Kharan) | Abdul Ghafoor Haideri | IJM | 15 October 1993 | |
| Balochistan | NA-205 (Khuzdar) | M. Ayub Jattak | BNM(M) | 15 October 1993 | |
| Balochistan | NA-206 (Lasbela, Gwadar) | Ghulam Akbar | PPP | 15 October 1993 | |
| Balochistan | NA-207 (Turbat, Panjgur) | Dr. M. Yaseen Baloch | BNM(H) | 15 October 1993 | |

== Minorities indirectly elected ==
The 10th National Assembly of Pakistan's minority members who were chosen indirectly are listed below.

| Region | Member | Community | Ref. |
|---|---|---|---|
| Islamabad | Julius Salik | Christian | |
| Punjab | George Clement | Christian | |
| Punjab | Tariq Christopher Qaiser | Christian | |
| Punjab | Bishop Rufin Julius | Christian | |
| Sindh | Khatumal Jeewan | Hindu/Scheduled Castes | |
| Sindh | Rana Chandar Singh | Hindu/Scheduled Castes | |
| Sindh | Kishin Chand Parwani | Hindu/Scheduled Castes | |
| Sindh | Moti Ram Malani | Hindu/Scheduled Castes | |
| Punjab | Yezdiar H. Kaikobad | Parsi/Sikh/Buddhists and others | |
| Punjab | Bashir ud din Khalid | Ahmadi | |

== Membership changes ==
| Region | Constituency | Member | Political party | Note | Ref. |
|---|---|---|---|---|---|
| Punjab | NA-37 (Rawalpindi-II) | Nadir Pervez Khan | PML (N) | Elected after seat vacated by Ch. M. Riaz | |
| Punjab | NA-92 (Lahore-I) | Abbas Sharif | PML (N) | Elected after seat vacated by Nawaz Sharif | |
| Punjab | NA-95 (Lahore-IV) | M. Ishaq Dar | PML (N) | Elected after seat vacated by Nawaz Sharif | |
| Punjab | NA-96 (Lahore-V) | Javed Hashmi | PML (N) | Elected after seat vacated by Nawaz Sharif | |
| Punjab | NA-111 (Okara-II) | Aslam Khan Kharl | PPP | Elected after seat vacated by Shafqat Abbas Rubera | |
| Punjab | NA-137 (Muzaffargarh-III) | Ghulam Arbi Khar | PPP | Elected after seat vacated by Ghulam Mustafa Khar | |
| Balochistan | NA-198 (Pishin) | Hamid Achakzai | PMAP | Elected after seat vacated by Mehmood Achakzai | |

== See also ==
- List of members of the 1st National Assembly of Pakistan
- List of members of the 2nd National Assembly of Pakistan
- List of members of the 3rd National Assembly of Pakistan
- List of members of the 4th National Assembly of Pakistan
- List of members of the 5th National Assembly of Pakistan
- List of members of the 6th National Assembly of Pakistan
- List of members of the 7th National Assembly of Pakistan
- List of members of the 8th National Assembly of Pakistan
- List of members of the 9th National Assembly of Pakistan
- List of members of the 10th National Assembly of Pakistan
- List of members of the 11th National Assembly of Pakistan
- List of members of the 12th National Assembly of Pakistan
- List of members of the 13th National Assembly of Pakistan
- List of members of the 14th National Assembly of Pakistan
- List of members of the 15th National Assembly of Pakistan
