= Malik Aamir Dogar =

Pakistani politician

- ملک عامر ڈوگر
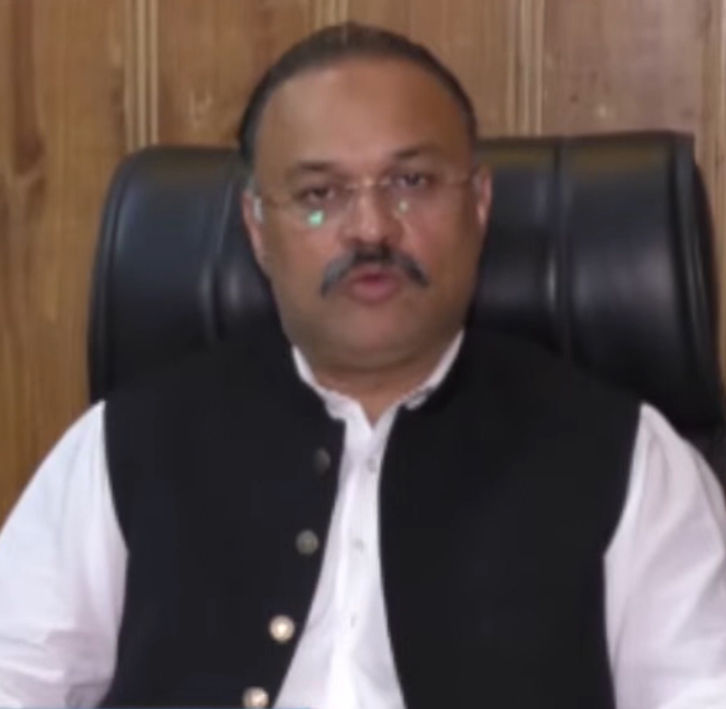

Special Assistant to the Prime Minister on Political Affairs
- In office 13 November 2020 – 10 April 2022
- President: Arif Alvi
- Prime Minister: Imran Khan

Chairman Non-Ministerial Standing Committee on Government Assurances
- In office 13 February 2019 – 10 April 2022

Member of the National Assembly of Pakistan
- Incumbent
- Assumed office 29 February 2024
- Constituency: NA-149 Multan-II
- In office 13 August 2018 – 17 January 2023
- Constituency: NA-149 (Multan-II)
- In office 27 October 2014 – 31 May 2018
- Constituency: NA-149 Multan-II

Member of the Provincial Assembly of Punjab
- In office 2008–2013
- Constituency: PP-198 (Multan-V)

Mayor of Multan
- In office 2002–2005

Personal details
- Born: 1 January 1972 (age 54) Multan, Punjab, Pakistan
- Party: PTI (2018-present)
- Other political affiliations: PPP (2008-2014)

Malik Muhammad Amir Dogar (Urdu: ملک محمد عامر ڈوگر; born 1 January 1972) is a Pakistani politician who has been a member of the National Assembly of Pakistan since February 2024 and previously served in this position from August 2018 till January 2023 and from October 2014 to May 2018. He was also a member of the Provincial Assembly of the Punjab from 2008 to 2013.He has been criticized for his secret ties with the establishment.

== Early life and education ==
He was born on 1 January 1972 in Multan. His father was Senator Malik Salah-ud-Din Dogar.

He has the degree of Master of Arts in Political Science and a Bachelor of Laws. from BZU University.

== Political career ==
He was elected to the Provincial Assembly of the Punjab as a candidate of Pakistan Peoples Party (PPP) from Constituency PP-198 (Multan-V) in the 2008 Pakistani general election. He received 24,908 votes and defeated Peerzada Mian Shahzad Maqbool Bhutta.

He ran for the seat of the National Assembly of Pakistan as a candidate of PPP from Constituency NA-149 (Multan-II) in the 2013 Pakistani general election but was unsuccessful. He received 20,719 votes and lost the seat to Javed Hashmi.

He was elected to the National Assembly as an independent candidate backed by the Pakistan Tehreek-e-Insaf (PTI) from Constituency NA-149 (Multan-II) in by-elections held in 2014. He received 57,972 votes and defeated Javed Hashmi.

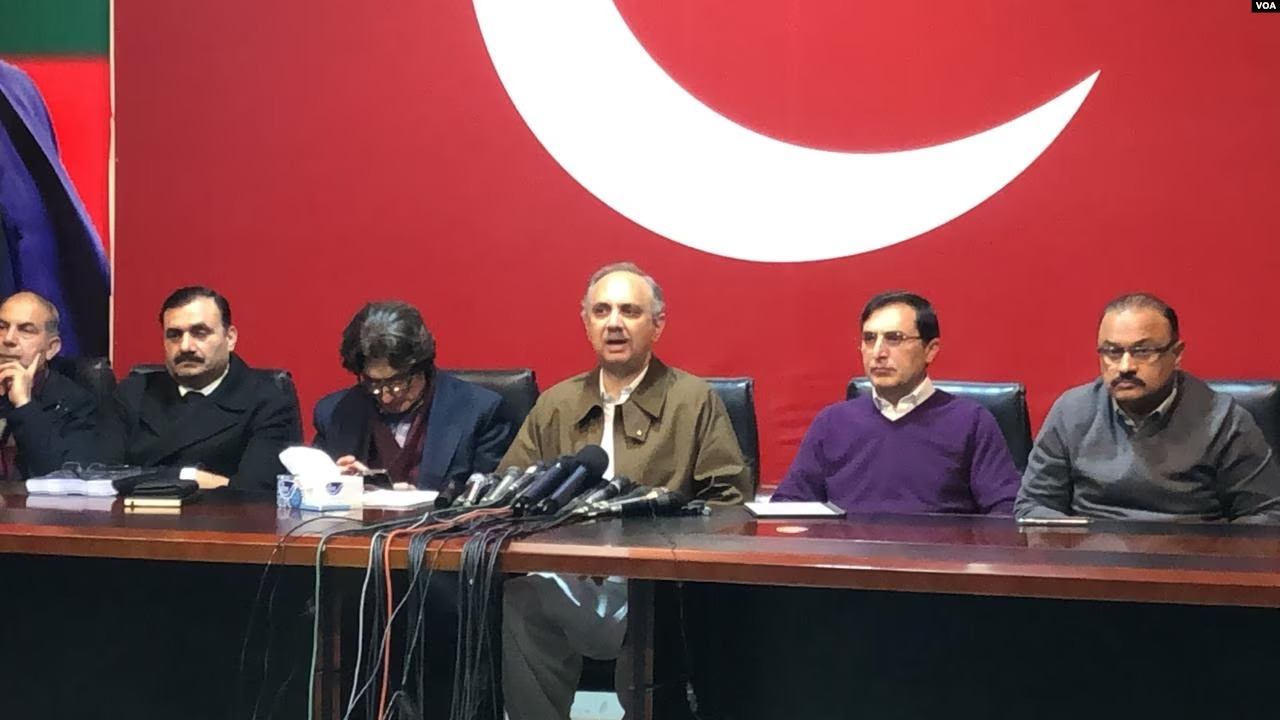
Aamir Dogar (rightmost) at a February 2024 press conference of the Pakistan Tehreek-e-Insaf.

He was re-elected to the National Assembly as a candidate of PTI from Constituency NA-155 (Multan-II) in the 2018 Pakistani general election.

He was re-elected to the National Assembly from NA-149 Multan-II as an independent candidate supported by PTI in the 2024 Pakistani general election. He received 143,692 votes and defeated Jahangir Tareen, the leader of Istehkam-e-Pakistan Party (IPP). After his election, alongside other PTI-supported MNAs, he joined the Sunni Ittehad Council (SIC).

He ran for the position of Speaker of the National Assembly as a candidate of SIC, but was unsuccessful. He received 91 votes and was defeated by Ayaz Sadiq of the Pakistan Muslim League (N), who received 199 votes.
