= 12th National Assembly =

12th National Assembly may refer to:

- 12th National Assembly of France
- 12th National Assembly of Pakistan
- 12th National Assembly of South Korea
