= NA-149 Multan-II =

Constituency of the National Assembly of Pakistan

- Constituency for the National Assembly of Pakistan
- Region: Multan City area of Multan District
- Electorate: 265,943

Current constituency
- Party: Pakistan Tehreek-e-Insaf
- Member: Malik Aamir Dogar
- Created from: NA-155 Multan-II

NA-149 Multan-II (این اے-۱۴۹،ملتان-۲) is a constituency for the National Assembly of Pakistan.

== Election 2002 ==
General elections were held on 10 October 2002. Malik Liaqat Ali Dogar of PPP won by 31,085 votes.

General election 2002: NA-149 Multan-II
Party	Candidate	Votes	%	±%
PPP	Malik Liaquat Ali Dogar	31,085	35.70	
MMA	Sheikh Khizar Hayat	19,867	22.81	
PML(N)	Muhammad Iqbal Khan Khakwani	18,763	21.55	
PML(Q)	Muhammad Khalid Khan Khakwani	16,276	18.69	
Others	Others (five candidates)	1,092	1.25	
Turnout		88,251	27.85	
Total valid votes		87,083	98.68	
Rejected ballots		1,168	1.32	
Majority		11,218	12.89	
Registered electors		316,900		

== Election 2008 ==
General elections were held on 18 February 2008. Javed Hashmi of PML-N won by 70,864 votes.

General election 2008: NA-149 Multan-II
Party	Candidate	Votes	%	±%
PML(N)	Javed Hashmi	70,864	55.37	
PPP	Malik Salah-Ud-Din Dogar	45,645	35.67	
PML(Q)	Sheikh Tariq Rasheed	10,810	8.45	
Others	Others (three candidates)	655	0.51	
Turnout		129,531	30.32	
Total valid votes		127,974	98.80	
Rejected ballots		1,557	1.20	
Majority		25,219	19.70	
Registered electors		427,253		
PML(N) gain from PPP				

== By-Election 2012 ==
By-Election 2012: NA-149 Multan-II
Party	Candidate	Votes	%	±%
PML(N)	Sheikh Muhammad Tariq Rasheed	37,143	58.09	
PPP	Malik Liaqat Ali Dogar	24,531	38.37	
Independent	Professor Muhammad Amjad Khan	1,664	2.60	
Others	Others (six candidates)	602	0.94	
Turnout		65,545	16.28	
Total valid votes		63,940	97.55	
Rejected ballots		1,605	2.45	
Majority		12,612	19.72	
Registered electors		402,621		
PML(N) hold				

== Election 2013 ==
General elections were held on 11 May 2013. Javed Hashmi of Pakistan Tehreek-e-Insaf won by 83,640 votes and became the member of National Assembly.

General election 2013: NA-149 Multan-II
Party	Candidate	Votes	%	±%
PTI	Javed Hashmi	83,640	44.53	
PML(N)	Sheikh Tariq Rasheed	73,898	39.35	
PPP	Malik Aamir Dogar	20,719	11.03	
Others	Others (ten candidates)	9,556	5.09	
Turnout		189,791	56.15	
Total valid votes		187,813	98.96	
Rejected ballots		1,978	1.04	
Majority		9,742	5.18	
Registered electors		338,005		
PTI gain from PML(N)				

== By-election 2014 ==
After Javed Hashmi's resignation from National Assembly, by election for this vacant seat were held on 16 October 2014. Javed Hashmi as an independent candidate with support from PML-N lost to Amir Dogar, also an independent candidate with Pakistan Tehreek-e-Insaf's backing.

By-election 2014: NA-149 Multan-II
Party	Candidate	Votes	%	±%
Independent	Malik Aamir Dogar	52,321	52.52	
Independent	Javed Hashmi	38,393	38.54	
Others	Others (sixteen candidates)	8,902	8.94	
Turnout		100,296	29.67	
Total valid votes		99,616	99.32	
Rejected ballots		680	0.68	
Majority		13,928	13.98	
Registered electors		338,005		
Independent gain from PTI				

== Election 2018 ==
General elections were held on 25 July 2018.

General election 2018: NA-155 Multan-II
Party	Candidate	Votes	%	±%
PTI	Malik Aamir Dogar	135,872	57.38	
PML(N)	Sheikh Tariq Rasheed	78,861	33.30	
TLP	Muhammad Ayoub	5,590	2.36	
Others	Others (thirteen candidates)	14,320	6.05	
Turnout		239,343	49.27	
Total valid votes		236,798	98.94	
Rejected ballots		2,722	1.06	
Majority		54,856	23.17	
Registered electors		485,810		

== Election 2024 ==
General elections were held on 8 February 2024. Malik Aamir Dogar won the election with 143,692 votes.

General election 2024: NA-149 Multan-II
Party	Candidate	Votes	%	±%
PTI	Malik Aamir Dogar (Note: Filed nomination papers as PTI candidate but ECP allowed him to run as an independent)	143,692	61.58	▲4.20
IPP	Jahangir Tareen	50,175	21.50	
PPP	Rizwan Ahmed Makki Haans	14,662	6.28	
TLP	Zahid Hameed Gujjar	10,659	4.57	▲2.21
Others	Others (fourteen candidates)	14,148	6.06	
Turnout		236,178	43.78	▼5.49
Total valid votes		233,336	98.80	
Rejected ballots		2,842	1.20	
Majority		93,517	40.08	▲16.91
Registered electors		539,446		

== See also ==
- NA-148 Multan-I
- NA-150 Multan-III
