= NA-106 Toba Tek Singh-II =

Constituency of the National Assembly of Pakistan

- Constituency for the National Assembly of Pakistan
- Region: Toba Tek Singh Tehsil (partly) including Toba Tek Singh city and Pirmahal Tehsil (partly) of Toba Tek Singh District
- Electorate: 552,626

Current constituency
- Party: Pakistan Muslim League (N)
- Member: Muhammad Junaid Anwar Chaudhry
- Created from: NA-93 Toba Tek Singh-II

NA-106 Toba Tek Singh-II (این اے-106، ٹوبہ ٹيک سنگھ-٢) is a constituency for the National Assembly of Pakistan. All political parties operate in this City. This city is located in Central Punjab and is considered one of the most educated and talented cities of Pakistan due to literacy rate and its geography.

== Members of Parliament ==
=== 2018–2023: NA-112 Toba Tek Singh-II ===
Election	Member	Party
2018	Muhammad Junaid Anwar Chaudhry	PML (N)

=== 2024–present: NA-106 Toba Tek Singh-II ===
Election	Member	Party
2024	Muhammad Junaid Anwar Chaudhry	PML (N)

== Election 2002 ==
General elections were held on 10 October 2002. Muhammad Farhan Latif an independent candidate won by 81,607 votes.

General election 2002: NA-93 Toba Tek Singh-II
Party	Candidate	Votes	%	±%
Independent	Muhammad Farhan Latif	81,607	51.85	
PPP	Hafizullah Ishaq	50,597	32.15	
MMA	Dr. Zahid Sattar	23,355	14.84	
Others	Others (three candidates)	1,841	1.16	
Turnout		160,778	51.97	
Total valid votes		157,400	97.90	
Rejected ballots		3,378	2.10	
Majority		31,010	19.70	
Registered electors		309,393		

== Election 2008 ==
General elections were held on 18 February 2008. Mohammad Junaid Anwar Chaudhry of PML-N won by 84,061 votes.

General election 2008: NA-93 Toba Tek Singh-II
Party	Candidate	Votes	%	±%
PML(N)	Muhammad Junaid Anwar Chaudhry	84,061	49.54	
PML(Q)	Mian Muhammad Kashif Ashfaq	64,287	37.88	
PPP	Hafeez-Ullah Ishaq	17,994	10.60	
Others	Others (four candidates)	3,348	1.98	
Turnout		174,886	60.47	
Total valid votes		169,690	97.03	
Rejected ballots		5,196	2.97	
Majority		19,774	11.66	
Registered electors		289,211		
PML(N) gain from Independent				

== Election 2013 ==
General elections were held on 11 May 2013. Mohammad Junaid Anwar Chaudhry of PML-N won by 117,534 votes and became the member of National Assembly.

General election 2013: NA-93 Toba Tek Singh-II
Party	Candidate	Votes	%	±%
PML(N)	Muhammad Junaid Anwar Chaudhry	117,534	52.99	
PTI	Chaudhry Muhammad Ashfaq	95,490	43.05	
Others	Others (twelve candidates)	8,793	3.96	
Turnout		227,612	64.51	
Total valid votes		221,817	97.45	
Rejected ballots		5,795	2.55	
Majority		22,044	9.94	
Registered electors		352,845		
PML(N) hold				

== Election 2018 ==
General elections were held on 25 July 2018.

General election 2018: NA-112 Toba Tek Singh-II
Party	Candidate	Votes	%	±%
PML(N)	Muhammad Junaid Anwar Chaudhry	125,303	45.94	
PTI	Chaudhry Muhammad Ashfaq	121,031	44.37	
Others	Others (thirteen candidates)	26,417	9.69	
Turnout		278,234	59.22	
Total valid votes		272,751	98.03	
Rejected ballots		5,483	1.97	
Majority		4,272	1.57	
Registered electors		469,863		
PML(N) hold		Swing	N/A	

== Election 2024 ==
General elections were held on 8 February 2024. Muhammad Junaid Anwar Chaudhry won the election with 137,779 votes.

General election 2024: NA-106 Toba Tek Singh-II
Party	Candidate	Votes	%	±%
PML(N)	Muhammad Junaid Anwar Chaudhry	137,779	44.92	▼1.02
PTI	Khalid Nawaz (Note: Filed nomination papers as PTI candidate but ECP allowed him to run as an independent)	137,105	44.70	▲0.33
Others	Others (fourteen candidates)	31,833	10.38	
Turnout		313,884	56.80	▼2.42
Total valid votes		306,717	97.72	
Rejected ballots		7,167	2.28	
Majority		674	0.22	▼1.35
Registered electors		552,626		
PML(N) hold		Swing	N/A	

== See also ==
- NA-105 Toba Tek Singh-I
- NA-107 Toba Tek Singh-III
