= Tahir Rasheed =

Tahir Rasheed may refer to:

- Sheikh Muhammad Tahir Rasheed, Pakistani politician
- Tahir Rasheed (cricketer), Pakistani first class cricketer
