= Bilal Khan (judge) =

Muhammad Bilal Khan محمد بلال خان

2nd Chief Justice Islamabad High Court
- In office March 7, 2009 – July 31, 2009
- Nominated by: Asif Ali Zardari
- Preceded by: Sardar Muhammad Aslam
- Succeeded by: none (High Court dissolved)

Justice Lahore High Court
- In office September 3, 2003 – Present ( Between March 7, 2009 - July 31, 2009 was at now dissolved IHC)
- Nominated by: Pervez Musharraf

Personal details
- Born: May 12, 1949 (age 77) Peshawar, Khyber Pakhtunkhwa, Pakistan

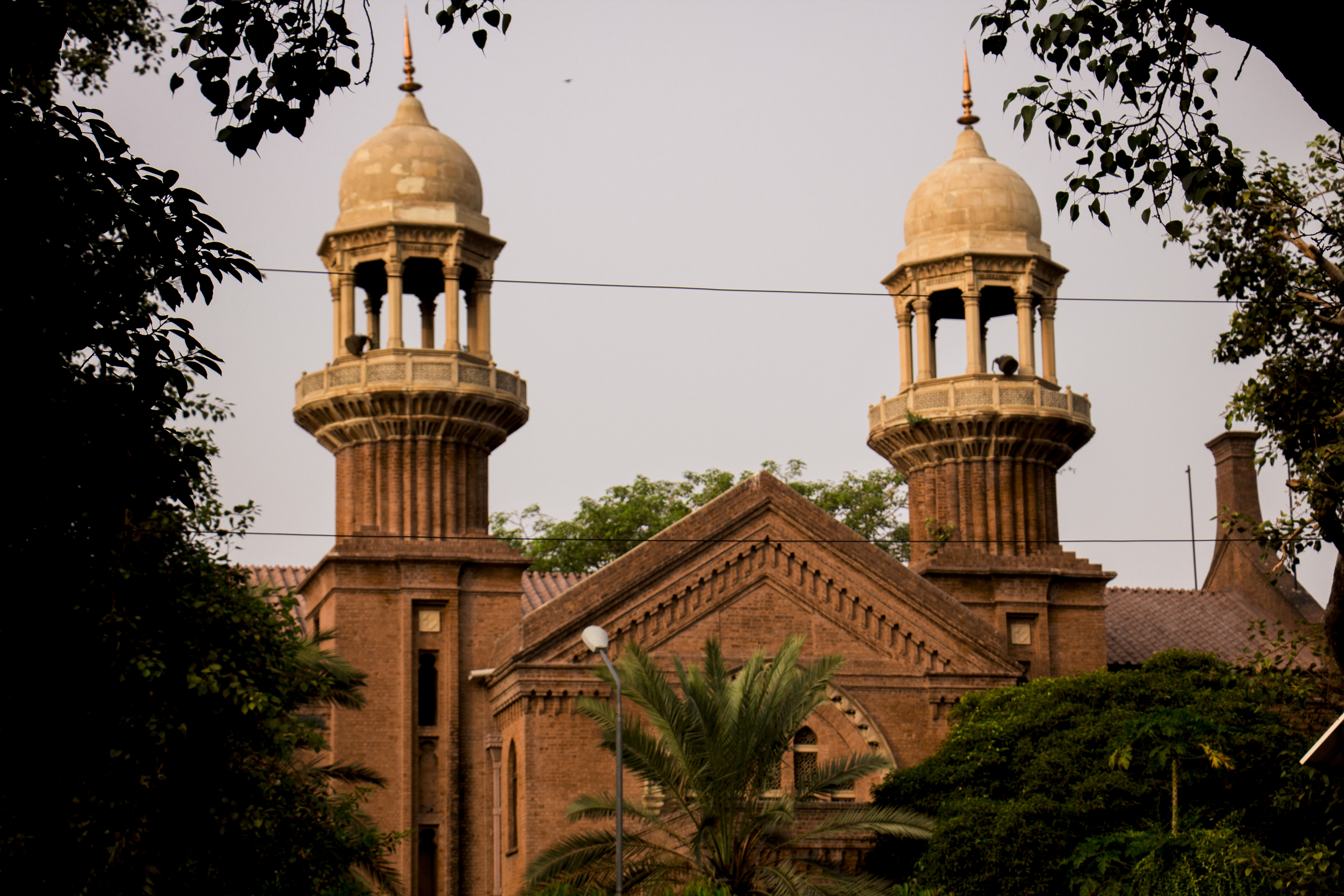
Lahore High Court

Muhammad Bilal Khan (Urdu: محمد بلال خان) was a judge of in the Lahore High Court in Pakistan.

== Career ==
Khan was a practicing lawyer before the Supreme Court of Pakistan and the Lahore High Court. He was appointed additional Advocate General of Punjab and worked in that position for almost four years.

Khan was appointed judge to the Lahore High Court on September 3, 2003, and remained in that position until March 6, 2009. On March 7, 2008, President Asif Ali Zardari appointed him as the second Chief Justice of the Islamabad High Court, succeeding Sardar Muhammad Aslam.

On July 31, 2009, a 14-person panel of the Supreme Court of Pakistan declared the creation of the Islamabad High Court unconstitutional. Khan was sent back as a judge of the Lahore High Court. Since he had taken oath under the 2007 Provisional Constitutional Order (see below), in contravention of a decision of a 7-judge panel of the Supreme Court, his case was referred to the Supreme Judicial Council of Pakistan.

== Controversies ==
=== PCO Oath ===
On November 3, 2007, the Chief of Staff of the Pakistani Army declared a state of emergency and issued a Provisional Constitutional Order (PCO). A 7-person panel of the Supreme Court issued an order declaring the state of emergency illegal and prohibiting all judges from taking oath under the PCO. Justice Khan was a sitting judge in Lahore High Court and chose to take a new oath under the PCO on November 3, 2007. Others of the 31 judges who took oath with him were Syed Zahid Hussain Bokhari, Nasim Sikandar, Khalid Alvi, Sakhi Hussain Bokhari, Muzammal Khan, Fazal-e-Miran Chohan, Syed Shabbar Raza Rizvi, Hamid Ali Shah, Tariq Shamim, Syed Asghar Haider, Hasnaat Ahmad Khan and Lahore High Court Chief Justice Iftikhar Hussain Chaudhry.

On July 31, 2009, a 14-person panel of the Supreme Court held that the PCO of November 3, 2007 was illegal. On November 2, 2007, they referred to the Supreme Judicial Council the cases of all judges who were members of the higher judiciary following talking oath of office under the PCO.

=== Land Allotment ===
According to a list presented to the National Assembly of Pakistan by the Federal Government Employees Foundation through the then-Housing Minister Syed Safwanullah on April 27, 2007, Khan was one of the 61 high court judges who were allotted plots in Sector G-14 of Islamabad.

=== Disqualification of Nawaz Sharif ===
On June 22, 2008, a three-member Lahore High Court bench that included Bilal Khan, Justice Abdul Shakoor Paracha and Justice Syed Shabbar Raza Rizvi, handed down a unanimous decision, disqualifying former prime minister Nawaz Sharif from contesting a by-election. The Court last ruled that Sharif was ineligible to run in an upcoming parliamentary by-elections because he had been convicted of a crime. The Sharif brothers had refused to appear before the court and defend themselves, declaring that they did not recognize the authority of "PCO judges".

=== Relations with underground ===
In the judicial system of Pakistan, the Supreme Judicial Council is mandated to check misconduct, moral degradation and corruption in the higher echelons of the judiciary. For the first time in the country's history, the Supreme Judicial Council has initiated suo motu proceedings against Khan over allegations of involvement in murky activities, including connections with the crime underworld.

Legal offices
Preceded by Sardar Muhammad Aslam	Chief Justice of Islamabad High Court; March 7, 2009 – July 31, 2009	Succeeded by Iqbal Hameed -ur-Rehman
