= Mian Farhan Latif =

Pakistani politician

Mian Farhan Latif MNA

Member of the National Assembly of Pakistan
- In office 2002–2007

Personal details
- Party: Pakistan Muslim League
- Parent: Mian Muhammad Latif (father)

Mian Farhan Latif is a Pakistani politician who had been a member of the National Assembly of Pakistan between 2002 and 2007. He is a son of Pakistani industrialist Mian Muhammad Latif who is the founder of Chenab Group.
