= Muhammad Aslam (judge) =

Pakistani judge (1947–2020)

Sardar Muhammad Aslam سردار محمد اسلم

Justice Supreme Court of Pakistan
- In office 7 March 2009 – 9 March 2012
- Nominated by: Asif Ali Zardari

1st Chief Justice Islamabad High Court
- In office 7 February 2008 – 6 March 2009
- Nominated by: Pervez Musharraf
- Preceded by: None
- Succeeded by: M.Bilal Khan

Associate Justice of Lahore High Court
- In office 3 September 2003 – 6 February 2008
- Nominated by: Pervez Musharraf

Personal details
- Born: 10 March 1947 British Indian Empire
- Died: 20 July 2020 (aged 73) Rawalpindi, Pakistan
- Cause of death: COVID-19
- Resting place: Kahuta

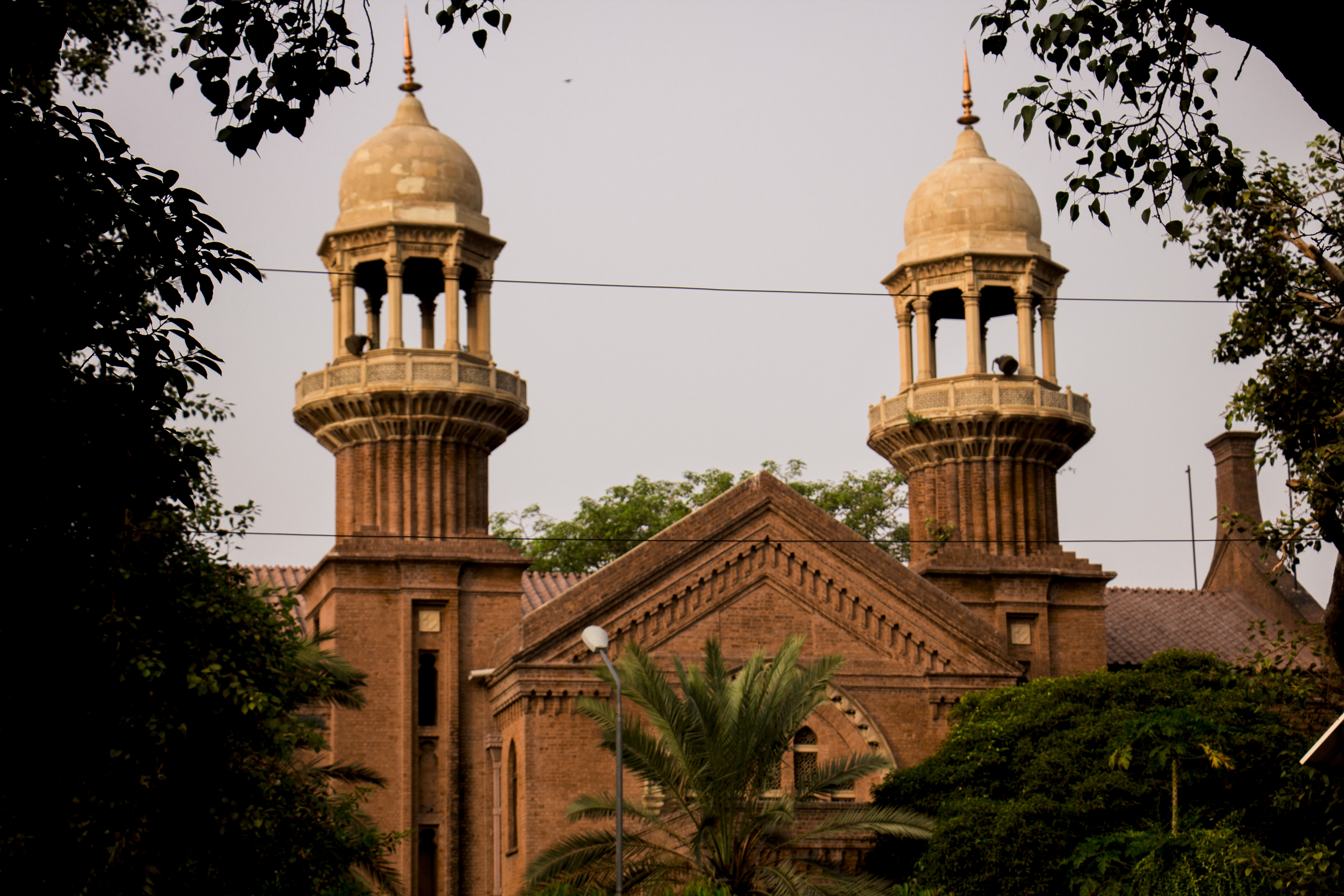
Lahore High Court

Sardar Muhammad Aslam (Urdu: سردار محمد اسلم) (10 March 1947 – 20 July 2020) was a Pakistani jurist, lawyer, and judge of the Lahore High Court. He was also a justice of the Supreme Court of Pakistan and a former chief justice of the Islamabad High Court. However, as result of Constitution Petition No. 09 of 2009 and Constitution Petition No. 08 of 2009 in the Supreme Court of Pakistan, on 31 July 2009, the court held his elevation to the Supreme Court as unconstitutional, and void ab initio. Through the same decision, the institution of the Islamabad High Court was held as unconstitutional and of no legal effect.

== Education ==
Aslam held a master's degree in arts (M.A.) and a Bachelor of Laws (LL.B.).

== Career ==
Aslam started his legal practice as an advocate in 1973. He enrolled as an advocate before the High Court in 1976 and enrolled as an advocate before the Supreme Court in 1982. He was appointed a deputy attorney general in 2001.

Aslam was appointed an additional judge of Lahore High Court on 3 September 2003 and confirmed as a judge in 2004. He remained on the bench of the Lahore High Court until 6 February 2008. He was then made the first chief justice of a newly created Islamabad High Court. He took the oath of that office on 7 February 2008 from the then President of Islamic Republic of Pakistan General Pervez Musharraf. On 7 March 2008, he was appointed to the Supreme Court by the then President of Islamic Republic of Pakistan Asif Ali Zardari.

On 31 July 2009, the Supreme Court of Pakistan while hearing Constitution Petitions No. 09 and 08 of 2009 held that any appointment made to the higher judiciary (Supreme Court or High Courts) between 3 November 2007 up to 22 March 2009 was unconstitutional, void ab initio and of no legal effect. The court held that all such elevations would revert to their prior positions of 2 November 2007, subject to their age of superannuation. As the result of the decision, Aslam was deemed to have retired as a judge of the Lahore High Court.

In the 31 July 2009 judgement, the court also declared the creation of the Islamabad High Court as unconstitutional, and of no legal effect. After this Aslam returned to private practice as an advocate.

== Controversies ==
=== PCO Oath ===
On 3 November 2007, the Army Chief of Staff of Pakistan declared the emergency and issued a Provisional Constitutional Order. A seven-panel Supreme Court issued an order that declared the declaration of emergency as illegal and prohibited all judges from taking oath when any Provisional Constitutional Order was in effect. Justice Aslam was a sitting judge on the Lahore High Court who chose to take the oath on 4 November 2007 during a Provisional Constitutiomal Order. At the same time, Sardar Muhammad Aslam, Abdul Shakoor Paracha, Sheikh Hakim Ali and Syed Sajjad Hussain Shah also took oath during PCO. As of 31 March 2009, the PCO had not been given protection by any constitutional amendment. In the past all PCO's were at a later point given constitutional protection.

On 31 July 2009, the Supreme Court of Pakistan held that any oath taken in contravention of the decision of the seven-panel Supreme Court has no legal effect. Aslam was reverted to this position of 2 November 2007 and since he had reached the age of retirement, was considered to have retired from the Lahore High Court.

== Death ==
Aslam died on 20 July 2020, after a brief illness caused by COVID-19.

Legal offices
Preceded by NO ONE	Chief Justice of Islamabad High Court; 7 February 2008 – 6 March 2009	Succeeded by Muhammad Bilal Khan
