= Muhammad Junaid Anwar =

Pakistani politician (born 1966)

Muhammad Junaid Anwar Chaudhry

Minister for Maritime Affairs
- Incumbent
- Assumed office 7 March 2025
- President: Asif Ali Zardari
- Prime Minister: Shehbaz Sharif

Member of the National Assembly of Pakistan
- Incumbent
- Assumed office 29 February 2024
- Constituency: NA-106 Toba Tek Singh-II
- In office 13 August 2018 – 10 August 2023
- Constituency: NA-112 (Toba Tek Singh-II)
- In office 30 May 2013 – 31 May 2018
- Constituency: NA-93 (Toba Tek Singh)
- In office 18 March 2008 – 17 March 2013
- Constituency: NA-93 (Toba Tek Singh)

Special Assistant to the Prime Minister on Communication
- In office 20 April 2022 – 14 August 2023
- President: Arif Alvi
- Prime Minister: Shehbaz Sharif

Minister of State for Communications
- In office 4 August 2017 – 31 May 2018
- President: Mamnoon Hussain
- Prime Minister: Shahid Khaqan Abbasi

Special Assistant to the Prime Minister on Youth Affairs
- In office 30 May 2013 – 4 August 2017
- President: Mamnoon Hussain
- Prime Minister: Nawaz Sharif

Personal details
- Born: 2 November 1966 (age 60) Toba Tek Singh, Punjab, Pakistan
- Party: PMLN (2008-present)

Muhammad Junaid Anwar Chaudhry (Urdu: محمد جنید انور چوہدری; born 2 November 1966) is a Pakistani politician who has been a member of the National Assembly of Pakistan since 2008, winning the election four times during this period. He served as Minister of State for Communications in Abbasi cabinet from August 2017 to May 2018. He is Federal Minister for Maritime Affairs since March 2025.

== Early life ==
He was born on 2 November 1966 in Toba Tek Singh. He belongs to a political Arain family of District Toba Tek Singh. His father and grand father have remained Members National Assembly of Pakistan. His grand father Chaudhry Abdul Sattar also served as District Nazim Toba Tek Singh from 2005 to 2009.

== Political career ==
He was elected to the National Assembly of Pakistan as a candidate of Pakistan Muslim League (N) (PML-N) from Constituency NA-93 (Toba Tek Singh-II) in the 2008 Pakistani general election. He received 84,061 votes and defeated Chaudhry Muhammad Ashfaq, a candidate of Pakistan Muslim League (Q) (PML-Q).

He was re-elected to the National Assembly as a candidate of PML-N from Constituency NA-93 (Toba Tek Singh-II) in the 2013 Pakistani general election. He received 117,534 votes and defeated Chaudhry Muhammad Ashfaq, a candidate of Pakistan Tehreek-e-Insaf (PTI).

Following the election of Shahid Khaqan Abbasi as Prime Minister of Pakistan in August 2017, he was inducted into the federal cabinet of Abbasi. He was appointed as the Minister of State for Communications. Upon the dissolution of the National Assembly on the expiration of its term on 31 May 2018, Chaudhry ceased to hold the office as Minister of State for Communications.

He was re-elected to the National Assembly as a candidate of PML-N from Constituency NA-112 (Toba Tek Singh-II) in the 2018 Pakistani general election. He received 125,303 votes and defeated Chaudhry Muhammad Ashfaq, a candidate of PTI.

He was appointed as Special Assistant (with the status of Federal Minister) to PM Shehbaz Sharif in April 2022. Junaid also served as head of Prime Minister’s complaint cell from April 2022 to August 2023.

He was re-elected to the National Assembly as a candidate of PML-N from NA-106 Toba Tek Singh-II in the 2024 Pakistani general election. He received 137,779 votes and defeated Khalid Nawaz, an independent candidate supported by (PTI) Pakistan Tehreek-e-Insaf and Chaudhry Muhammad Ashfaq, a candidate of (IPP) Istehkam-e-Pakistan Party.

He was appointed as Federal Minister for Maritime Affairs.
