= Syed Tanveer-ul-Hassan Gillani =

Pakistani politician (1958–2025)

- سید تنویرالحسن گیلانی

Federal Minister of State (Parliamentary Affairs)
- In office circa 1994 – 1996
- Constituency: Multan

Personal details
- Born: 23 March 1958
- Died: 31 July 2025 (aged 67) Islamabad, Pakistan
- Party: Pakistan People's Party (earlier IJI and PML‑Q)
- Relatives: Yousaf Raza Gilani (cousin)
- Occupation: Politician

Syed Tanveer-ul-Hassan Gillani (23 March 1958 – 31 July 2025) was a Pakistani politician and federal minister. A cousin of former Prime Minister and Senate Chairman Yousaf Raza Gilani, he represented Multan in politics for several decades. Gillani served as a member of the National Assembly (MNA) in the early 1990s and later held appointed positions. He was known for roles such as Vice-Chairman of the Punjab Sports Board and President of the Anjuman-i-Islamia in Multan, and was active in Islamic social and welfare organizations.

Gillani contested elections on various party tickets – winning a National Assembly seat in 1990 as an IJI candidate, and later running as a PPP nominee in 1993 and 1997 and as a PML-Q candidate in 2002. He died in Islamabad on 31 July 2025 after being hospitalised getting stomach bloating and skin cancer.

== Political career ==
Gillani’s parliamentary career began when he was elected to the National Assembly from Multan in the 1990 general election on an IJI ticket. (IJI was the Islami Jamhoori Ittehad coalition led by Nawaz Sharif.) In the 1993 and 1997 elections he ran as a Pakistan People's Party (PPP) candidate from Multan but lost to Sheikh Tahir Rasheed of the PML‑N. In the 2002 general election, he again contested from NA-150 Multan-III – this time on a Pakistan Muslim League (Q) ticket – receiving 17,636 votes.

Gillani held federal posts in the 1990s; he was Minister of State for Parliamentary Affairs under Prime Minister Benazir Bhutto (1994–96). He also held party and civic roles in Punjab and Multan. He served as Vice-Chairman of the Punjab Sports Board and was head of Anjuman-i-Islamia Multan.

== Death ==
Gillani died on 31 July 2025 at 15:38 PM in Islamabad, where he had been hospitalised after a long illness as he had been under medical care in the capital city. He was 67. His body was flown back to Multan (his home city) for funeral prayers and burial.

His death prompted widespread condolences. Prime Minister Shehbaz Sharif issued a statement expressing deep grief, noting Gillani’s “meritorious services…for the welfare of the people” and praying for his soul. Senate Chairman Yousaf Raza Gilani (his cousin) also mourned him; the Senate leader said that the late Makhdoom Tanveer-ul-Hassan's religious, political and social services were "unforgettable".
