= Sheikh Tahir Rasheed =

Pakistani politician (1954–2020)

Shafique Shah شيخ محمد طاہر رشيد

Member of the National Assembly of Pakistan
- In office 18 October 1993 – 17 November 1996
- In office 18 February 1997 – 12 October 1999

Member of the Provincial Assembly of the Punjab
- In office 5 November 1990 – 28 June 1993

Personal details
- Born: 20 April 1954
- Died: 3 June 2020 (aged 66)

Sheikh Muhammad Tahir Rasheed, also known as Tahir Rashid (Urdu: شيخ محمد طاہر رشيد; 20 April 1954 – 3 June 2020) was a Pakistani politician who was affiliated with the Pakistan Muslim League. He was previously Member of National Assembly of Pakistan (MNA) (1993–1996, 1997–1999) and Member of Provincial Assembly (MPA) (1990–1993). He was also the Central Vice-President of the Pakistan Muslim League.

== Family and education ==
He completed his initial education at Millat High School and then Government Emerson College in Multan and graduated from the University of Sindh, Jamshoro.

Tahir Rasheed hailed from a family that traces its roots to Jhajjar tehsil located in Rohtak district India. His grandfather, Sheikh Abdus Samad was assassinated while migrating to Pakistan at the time of the independence of Pakistan in 1947. Tahir Rasheed and his family represent a community which has large business and political interests in the urban politics of Multan city.

His father, Sheikh Muhammad Rasheed, was his political mentor; the former Member of Federal Parliament (Majlis-e-Shoora) in 1980s nominated by General Zia-ul-Haq and elected Member of National Assembly of Pakistan (MNA), when elections were held on a non-party basis for the term 1985–1988.

Tahir Rasheed was married and has three sons, one daughter. The eldest son Muhammad Ahmad Tahir is currently studying abroad. His two other sons are Muhammad Ahsan Yousaf Tahir and Muhammad Asad Ali Asghar, who are currently studying in Multan.

== Political career ==
An agriculturist by profession turned to politics in 1987 as an elected councillor of Municipal Corporation Multan. He rose through the political ranks, being elected as a Member of Provincial Assembly (MPA) for the term of 1990–1993. He was elected to National Assembly of Pakistan serving two consecutive terms, the first from 1993 to 1996 and the second from February 1997 to October 1999.

=== 1990–1993 ===
In 1990, he contested his first election for the post of Member of Provincial Assembly. He was given a ticket for constituency PP-163 in the remote area of Multan where he was an outsider and his opponent was Makhdoom Hassan Raza. Tahir Rasheed managed to win the seat by a margin of 7,000 votes. For three years he served as an MPA but when Nawaz Sharif resigned along with President Ghulam Ishaq Khan in 1993, assemblies were dissolved and new elections were scheduled.

=== 1993 ===
In November 1993, the new President Farooq Leghari called for fresh elections. Tahir Rasheed was once again issued a ticket from Multan but this time, it was for National Assembly of Pakistan from constituency NA-116 where his opponent was Syed Tanveer-ul Hassan Gillani, a Former Federal Minister who is also a cousin of Ex Prime Minister Makhdoom Syed Yousaf Raza Gilani. He was elected MNA on IJI ticket in 1990. In 1993, when the PML-N awarded ticket to Tahir Rasheed, Gilani opted for the PPP ticket.

=== 1997–1999 ===
In 1997, new elections were called for again. Tahir Rasheed was given Pakistan Muslim League ticket to contest the elections, from the same constituency NA-116. Again he was up against Syed Tanveer-ul-Hassan Gilani, who is a close relative of Ex Prime Minister Syed Yousaf Raza Gilani and PML-N's Javed Hashmi. However, Tahir Rasheed once again managed to defeat former federal ministers.

During this time, Sheikh Tahir Rasheed became a member of Parliamentary Steering Committee (PSC). The PSC was created in response to UNDP's assistance to enhance the professional capacity of the parliamentarians and National Assembly Secretariat and to support other democratic processes. He was one of the members of parliament who was also interested in assistance regarding relations between the Parliament and the media and in making television coverage of Parliament more effective.

In 1998, Sheikh Tahir Rasheed was one of the foremost supporters of the decision taken by the government to develop nuclear weapons.

=== 2002–2004 ===
Tahir Rasheed did not participate in the general elections held in 2002, choosing to run instead for Zila Nazim of Multan District in a by election held in 2003.

=== 2005 ===
Tahir Rasheed was one of the few people in the PML N who was trying to convince the senior leadership of the PML N to stop supporting the PPP in the ARD as he believed the PPP was not sincere with PML-N and had been taking an advantage of the PML-N to achieve their own objectives and capture the PML-N vote bank.

In August 2005, he decided to join the Pakistan Muslim League due to differences with the party policies and because his supporters were finding it difficult to adjust with the PPP in the ARD.

Tahir Rasheed was followed by Ex-Punjab Food Minister Hafiz Iqbal Khakwani, Ex-MNA Syed Javed Ali Shah, sitting MPA Syed Mujahid Ali Shah, PML-N Ex-MPA Khalid Khokhar and the son of Ex-MPA Sheikh Amir Khalil to join PML.

=== 2008 elections ===
Tahir Rasheed lost.

=== Breakaway from PML-Q ===
On 4 May 2011, Sheikh Muhammad Tahir Rasheed announced his separation from Pakistan Muslim League.

=== 2012 by-elections ===
On 25 February 2012, Sheikh Muhammad Tahir Rasheed 's younger brother Sheikh Muhammad Tariq Rasheed was elected as an MNA from NA-149. This seat was vacated by Javed Hashmi who has joined Pakistan Tehreek-e-Insaf (PTI) led by Imran Khan.

Political offices
Preceded by Khurshid Ahmad Khan	Member of the Provincial Assembly of the Punjab; 5 November 1990 – 28 June 1993	Succeeded by Rana Noor ul Hassan
Preceded by Syed Tanvir ul Hassan Gilani	Member of the National Assembly of Pakistan; 18 October 1993 – 17 November 1996	Succeeded by
Preceded by	2nd term Member of the National Assembly of Pakistan; 18 February 1997 – 12 October 1999	Succeeded by Malik Liaqat Dogar
Preceded by Makhdoom Javed Hashmi	Member of the National Assembly of Pakistan; 25 February 2012 –	Succeeded by Sheikh Muhammad Tariq Rasheed
Party political offices
Preceded by	Central Vice President of the Pakistan Muslim League; 2006–2011	Succeeded by Incumbent
Party political offices
Preceded by	Leader of Pakistan Muslim League; 2012 –	Succeeded by Incumbent
