= Asiya Azeem =

Pakistani politician

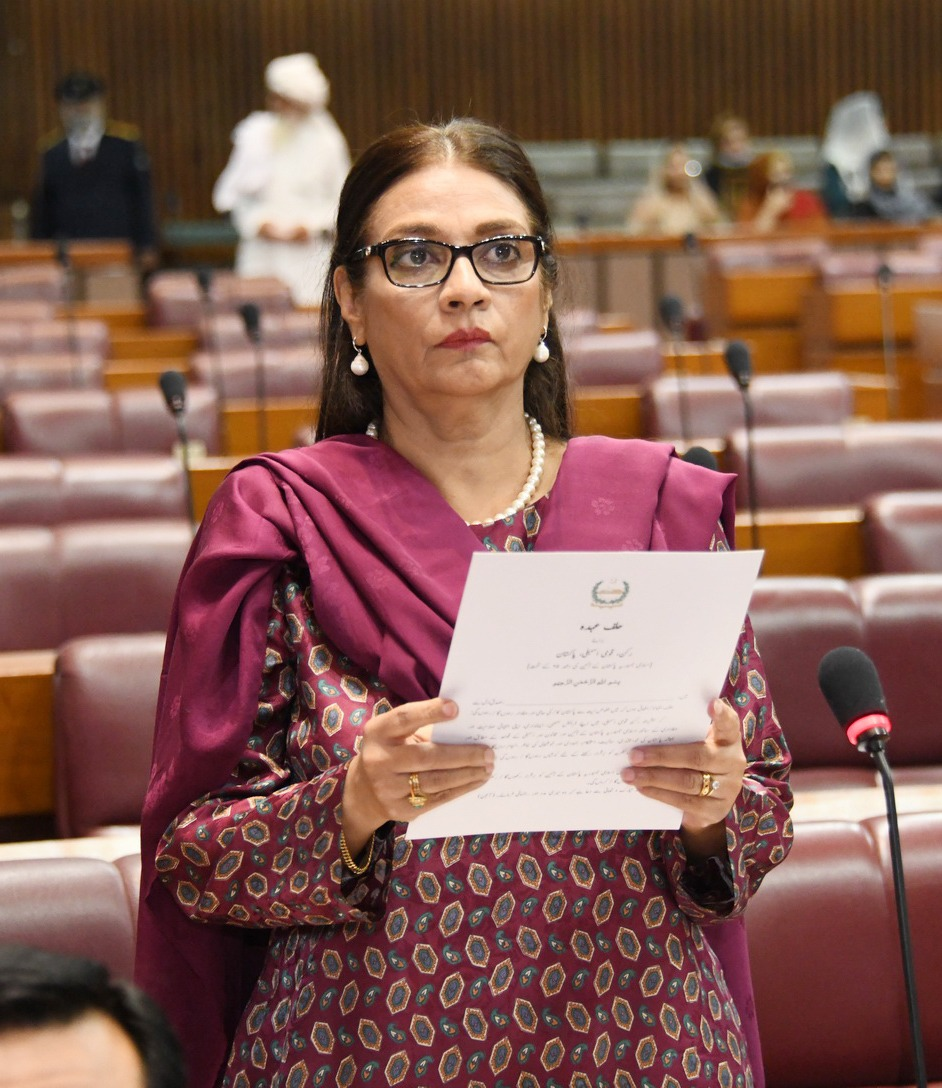

Member of the National Assembly of Pakistan
- In office 7 October 2022 – 10 August 2023
- Constituency: Reserved Seat for Women (Punjab)
- In office 18 November 2002 – 17 November 2007
- Constituency: Reserved Seat for Women (Punjab)

Personal details
- Party: Istehkam-e-Pakistan Party (2023–present)
- Other political affiliations: Pakistan Tehreek-e-Insaf (2018–2023); Pakistan Muslim League (N) (2013–2018); Pakistan Peoples Muslim League (2010–2013); Pakistan Muslim League (Q) (2002–2010)
- Spouse: Azeem Chaudhary
- Education: University of the Punjab, La Trobe University, National Defence University

Asiya Azeem (Urdu: آسیہ عظیم) is a Pakistani politician who had been a member of the National Assembly of Pakistan from October 2022 till August 2023 and from November 2002 till November 2007. Her terms in Parliament coincide with the 7th and 10th Phases of the Pakistani Women's Parliamentary History.

== Education ==
She was awarded a Masters in Fine Arts with Distinction from the University of the Punjab in 1985. She had also pursued her undergraduate degree from the University of the Punjab wherein she was awarded a Bachelors of Fine Arts (Hons.) with Distinction.

== Early life and family ==
She taught at the Lahore College for Women and College of Home Economics from 1986 to 1993, and has served as a visiting faculty at several institutes up until 2002.

She is married to Azeem Chaudhary.

== Political career ==
=== First tenure 12th National Assembly of Pakistan (2002-2007) ===
She was elected to the 12th National Assembly of Pakistan as a candidate of Pakistan Muslim League (Q) on a Reserved Seat for Women from Punjab in the 2002 Pakistani general election. Her term lasted from 18 November 2002 until 17 November 2007. During her term she also served as a member of the Public Accounts Committee; as a committee member she made valuable contributions towards probing and recovering losses and irregularities caused to the national exchequer.

Some of her other contributions from that time include: (a) calling for maintaining the momentum and flow of public donations for quake victims and creating consensus among government and opposition parties on this natural disaster during the 2005 Kashmir Earthquake, and, (b) the National Assembly of Pakistan during 2005 accepted her resolution for implementing Disaster Management courses for all students studying in Pakistani Institutions. The resolution also proposed that extra 10 marks be awarded to the said students in their final examination. She participated in the Roundtable Discussion with Dr. Kamal Hossain, Former Foreign Minister of Bangladesh on Lessons for Pakistan from Bangladeshi Electoral Reforms and the System of Caretaker Government on May 17, 2006, organised by PILDAT. During her tenure she remained a strong advocate of safeguarding the rights of women in keeping with the injunctions of the Quran and Sunnah. Azeem remained amongst the top female legislators of the 12th National Assembly of Pakistan; who tabled resolutions of national interest before the august House.

=== Pakistan Tehreek-e-Insaf ===
Azeem joined Pakistan Tehreek-e-Insaf during 2018 and was subsequently designated as the Senior Vice President of the Islamabad region. She was a candidate for the Reserved Seat(s) for Women (Punjab) in the National Assembly for the General Elections in 2018.

She was re-elected to the 15th National Assembly of Pakistan on 17 August 2022 due to the resignation of Shireen Mazari. It was misreported that the acceptance of Mazari's resignation along with 10 others were suspended by the Islamabad High Court on 9 September 2022. The Islamabad High Court on 12 September 2022 clarified that only one resignation had been suspended which is of Abdul Shakoor Shad.

=== Second tenure 15th National Assembly of Pakistan (2018-2023) ===
Azeem took oath for her second term of the National Assembly on 7 October 2022. The oath was administered by Raja Pervez Ashraf, Speaker of the National Assembly of Pakistan.

During her first address to the 15th National Assembly; Azeem stressed the need for dialogue to find solutions to the prevailing problems of Pakistan. “We are not enemies, just political rivals,” she said. The lawmaker called for actions to end the politics of hate, saying that bullying was not the job of politicians. “We reject those who spread mischief on Earth. Allah commands us not to spread mischief on Earth,” she said. Azeem said that the government alone could not resolve all the problems, therefore, parliament had to find the solutions. She emphasised on the supremacy of parliament. She called for devising a procedure for the appointment of judges.

On October 17, 2022, Azeem spoke on her calling attention notice regarding illegal shops and carts in the commercial centers of Islamabad. The matter was forwarded to the standing committee on Interior.

=== Istehkam-e-Pakistan Party ===
On 18 August 2023, she joined the Istehkam-e-Pakistan Party.

== See also ==
- List of members of the 12th National Assembly of Pakistan
- List of members of the 15th National Assembly of Pakistan
