= Mian Muhammad Latif =

Pakistani businessman (born 1947)

Mian Mohammed Latif
- Born: 28 August 1947 (age 79); Toba Tek Singh, Punjab, Pakistan
- Citizenship: Pakistani
- Occupation: Founder of the Chenab Group
- Children: Mian Farhan Latif; Mian Faisal Latif; Mian Rizwan Latif; Mian Zeeshan Latif (sons)
- Relatives: Chaudhry Muhammad Ashfaq (brother)

Mian Muhammad Latif (Urdu: میاں محمد لطیف; born 28 August 1947) is a Pakistani businessman who is the founder of Chenab Group. He is the father of Pakistani politician Mian Farhan Latif.

== Early life and career ==
Mian Muhammad Latif was born in 1947 in Toba Tek Singh to an Arain family. His father Haji Muhammad Saleem was a cotton industrialist and an entrepreneur. He later moved to Faisalabad for studies and after graduating in 1974, he started textile business by setting up a small processing unit which later became known as Chenab Group. In 1997, Mian Latif introduced the concept of ChenOne retail stores in Pakistan.

== Personal life ==
His younger brother Chaudhry Muhammad Ashfaq is an ex-MNA (Member of National Assembly or Parliament) and a former 'District Nazim' of Toba Tek Singh. His son Mian Farhan Latif was the youngest MNA during PML-Q (Pakistan Muslim League party) tenure of 2002-2008.

== Awards and recognition ==
Mian Latif was awarded with Tamgha-e-Imtiaz civil award (Medal of Excellence) by President Pervez Musharraf, on 23 March 2004, for his services to the industry.
