= Shehnaz Sheikh (politician) =

Pakistani Australian former politician

Member of the National Assembly of Pakistan
- In office 2002–2012

Begum Shehnaz Sheikh (Urdu: شہناز شیخ) is a Pakistani Australian former politician who served as member of the National Assembly of Pakistan before her membership termination.

== Political career ==
She was elected to the National Assembly of Pakistan as a candidate of Pakistan Peoples Party on a seat reserved for women from Punjab in the 1988 Pakistani general election.

She was re-elected to the National Assembly of Pakistan as a candidate of Pakistan Peoples Party on a seat reserved for women from Punjab in the 2002 Pakistani general election.

She was re-elected to the National Assembly of Pakistan as a candidate of Pakistan Muslim League (Q) on a seat reserved for women from Punjab in the 2008 Pakistani general election. Her National Assembly membership was suspended in 2012 by the Supreme Court of Pakistan due to her Australian citizenship.
