= Shahida Akhtar Ali =

Pakistani politician

Member of the National Assembly of Pakistan
- In office 1 June 2013 – 31 May 2018
- In office 18 November 2002 – 18 November 2007
- Constituency: Reserved seat for women

Personal details
- Party: Jamiat Ulema-e-Islam (F)

Shahida Akhtar Ali (Urdu: شاہدہ اختر علی) is a Pakistani politician who had been a member of the National Assembly of Pakistan from 2002 to 2007 and again from June 2013 to May 2018.

== Political career ==
She was elected to the National Assembly of Pakistan as a candidate of Jamiat Ulema-e-Islam (F) on a reserved seat for women from Khyber Pakhtunkhwa in the 2002 Pakistani general election.

She was re-elected to the National Assembly as a candidate of Jamiat Ulema-e-Islam (F) on a reserved seat for women from Khyber Pakhtunkhwa in the 2013 Pakistani general election.
