= Rukhsana Bangash =

Pakistani politician

Member of the National Assembly of Pakistan
- In office 2002–2013

Rukhsana Bangash (Urdu: رخسانہ بنگش) is a Pakistani politician who served as member of the National Assembly of Pakistan.

== Political career ==
She was elected to the National Assembly of Pakistan as a candidate of Pakistan Peoples Party on a seat reserved for women from Punjab in the 2002 Pakistani general election.

She was re-elected to the National Assembly of Pakistan as a candidate of Pakistan Peoples Party on a seat reserved for women from Punjab in the 2008 Pakistani general election.
