= Shabbir Hassan Ansari =

Pakistani politician

Shabbir Hassan Ansari is a former member of the National Assembly of Pakistan. He was elected in 1993 by the people of the Hyderabad II constituency on the platform of the Pakistan Muslim League (N) with 18,562 votes and a majority of 8,730.

He is a member of the Central Working Committee of the Pakistan Muslim League (N).
