= Mian Muhammad Munir =

Pakistani politician (born 1954)

Member of the Provincial Assembly of the Punjab
- In office 29 May 2013 – 31 May 2018

Personal details
- Born: 13 December 1954 (age 71) Okara, Punjab, Pakistan
- Party: PMLN (2013-present)

Mian Muhammad Munir is a Pakistani politician who was a Member of the Provincial Assembly of the Punjab, from May 2013 to May 2018.

== Early life and education ==
He was born on 13 December 1954 in Okara

He is famous for his contributions to cricket in his city.

He graduated in 2002 from Bahauddin Zakariya University and has the degree of Bachelor of Arts.

== Political career ==
He was elected to the Provincial Assembly of the Punjab as a candidate of Pakistan Muslim League (Nawaz) from Constituency PP-190 (Okara-VI) in the 2013 Pakistani general election.

In December 2013, he was appointed as Parliamentary Secretary for Excise & Taxation.

He was elected second time to the Provincial Assembly of the Punjab as a candidate of Pakistan Muslim League (Nawaz) from Constituency PP-191 (Okara-VII) in the 2024 Pakistani general election.
