= Rozina Tufail =

Pakistani politician

Member of the National Assembly of Pakistan
- In office 2002–2007
- Constituency: Reserved seat for women

Rozina Tufail is a Pakistani politician who had been a member of the National Assembly of Pakistan from 2002 to 2007.
