= Tariq Christopher Qaiser =

Pakistani politician

- طارق کرسٹوفر قیصر

Member of the National Assembly of Pakistan
- In office 1 June 2013 – 31 May 2018
- Constituency: Reserved seat for minorities

Personal details
- Party: Pakistan Muslim League (N)

Tariq Christopher Qaiser (Urdu: طارق کرسٹوفر قیصر) is a Pakistani politician who had been a member of the National Assembly of Pakistan from June 2013 to May 2018.

== Political career ==
He was elected to the National Assembly of Pakistan as a candidate of Pakistan Muslim League (N) on a seat reserved for minorities in the 2013 Pakistani general election.
