= Chaudhry Muhammad Ashfaq =

Pakistani politician

Member of the National Assembly of Pakistan
- In office 1993–1996

Personal details
- Born: 22 February 1945 Toba Tek Singh, Punjab, Pakistan
- Died: 24 June 2026 (aged 81) Toba Tek Singh, Punjab, Pakistan
- Party: IPP (2023-present)
- Other political affiliations: Independent (2022-2023); PTI (2012–2022); Independent (2008-2012); PML-Q (2002–2008); PMLN (1997–2002); PPP (1988–1997)

Chaudhry Muhammad Ashfaq (born 22 February 1945) is a Pakistani politician of the Istehkam-e-Pakistan Party. He was elected as a member of the National Assembly of Pakistan and Provincial Assembly of the Punjab.

== Political career ==
Ashfaq was elected as Member Provincial Assembly (MPA) Punjab in the 1988 general election from Toba Tek Singh as a candidate of the Pakistan Peoples Party.

He was defeated in the general election of 1990.

He was elected as Member National Assembly (MNA) Pakistan in the 1993 general election as a candidate of the Pakistan Peoples Party.

Ashfaq was defeated in the general election of 1997. Later he joined the Pakistan Muslim League-N.

In 2001, he was elected as District Nazim Toba Tek Singh.

In 2005, he was defeated in the election of District Nazim by Chaudhry Abdul Sattar, who was the grandfather of Muhammad Junaid Anwar Chaudhry of Pakistan Muslim League-N.

He was defeated in the MNA seat in the 2008 Pakistani general election as a candidate of Pakistan Muslim League-Q by Muhammad Junaid Anwar Chaudhry of Pakistan Muslim League-N.

Ashfaq was again defeated in the MNA seat in the 2013 Pakistani general election as a candidate of Pakistan Tehreek-e-Insaf by Muhammad Junaid Anwar Chaudhry of Pakistan Muslim League-N.

He was again defeated in the MNA seat in the 2018 Pakistani general election as a candidate of Pakistan Tehreek-e-Insaf by Muhammad Junaid Anwar Chaudhry of Pakistan Muslim League-N, who won for the third time consecutively.

In 2023, Ashfaq joined the IPP. This is the fifth time in his political career that he has switched loyalties.

Ashfaq was again defeated in the MNA seat in the 2024 Pakistani general election as a candidate of IPP by Muhammad Junaid Anwar Chaudhry of PMLN for the fourth time.

== Personal life ==
Pakistani industrialist Mian Muhammad Latif, the founder of Chenab Group, is his brother.
