= Mehnaz Raffi =

Pakistani politician and women's rights activist (born 1943)

Mehnaz Rafi
- مہناز رفیع
- Born: Mehnaz Chaudhry; 1943 (age 82–83); Lucknow, British India
- Other name: Begum Mehnaz Rafi
- Occupations: Actress; Politician; Human Rights Activist
- Years active: 1960 – present
- Children: 2

Mehnaz Rafi (Urdu: مہناز رفیع; born 1943) is a Pakistani politician and women's rights activist. Rafi was a member of the National Assembly of Pakistan from 2002 to 2007. She is recognised for her advocacy for women's rights in Pakistan and her role in legislative reforms.

== Early life ==
Mehnaz Rafi was born in 1943 in Lucknow, British India. She migrated with her family to Lahore during the partition of India in 1947 and was raised in Lahore. Mehnaz's father Chaudhry Muhammad Rafi was Joint Secretary of the All-India Muslim League Uttar Pradesh (U-P) branch and an active worker of the Pakistan Movement.

== Career ==
=== Acting career ===
She started working at Radio Pakistan, then appeared in Pakistan Television (PTV) dramas in 1964 when PTV was a newly established national channel at Lahore.

She worked in TV dramas in the 1970s written by Ashfaq Ahmed and Bano Qudsia. She worked in more than a hundred dramas on PTV and was a popular actress in 1970s.

=== Political career ===
Rafi began her political journey with the Tehrik-i-Istaqlal and later joined the Pakistan Muslim League (N). After becoming a member of the Pakistan Muslim League (Q), she contested in the 2002 general elections and was elected to the National Assembly on a reserved seat for women from Punjab.

=== Activist career ===
Rafi participated in the 1983 women's march in Lahore against oppressive laws under General Zia-ul-Haq. She was among the founding members of the Women's Action Forum (WAF), a collective established to oppose discriminatory laws and advocate for women's rights in Pakistan. She continues to promote women's empowerment through various platforms, including serving as the Women Wing Convenor at the Nazaria-i-Pakistan Trust.

Rafi's contributions have been instrumental in raising awareness about women's rights issues in Pakistan. She is regarded as a vocal advocate for legislative reform and gender justice.

== Filmography ==
=== Television ===
Year	Title	Role	Network
1964	Kisan Ki Beti	Chand	PTV
1969	Talkhi Sham	Neelma	PTV
1970	Aik Mohabbat So Afsanay	Shaista	PTV
1971	Dada Aur Dil Dada	Ayesha	PTV
1972	Maraat-e-Muhabbat	Mona	PTV
1973	Shana-e-Saba	Rahat	PTV
1974	Ajar-e-Aswad	Seemi	PTV
1975	Zood-e-Pashieman	Zahira	PTV
1976	Aghosh-e-Vida	Irene	PTV
