= Rai Rashid Ahmed Khan =

Pakistani politician

Rai Rashid Ahmed Khan was born in Edinburgh on 30 March 1970. He was a member of National Assembly of Pakistan and spoke at United Nations on serious issues pertaining to the Arab Peninsula.

He is a barrister and Queen’s Counsel with more than 25 years of professional experience as an international criminal law and human rights lawyer.

Khan holds a Bachelor of Laws degree with Honours from King’s College, University of London, as well as a Ph.D in International and Comparative Law from University of Oxford.

Since 2017 he has been serving as President of the International Criminal Court Bar Association (ICCBA) at The Hague.
