= Mamoona Hashmi =

Pakistani politician

Member of the National Assembly of Pakistan
- In office 2002–2012

Personal details
- Parent: Javed Hashmi (father)

Mamoona Hashmi (Urdu: میمونہ ہاشمی) is a Pakistani politician who served as member of the National Assembly of Pakistan.

== Political career ==
She was elected to the National Assembly of Pakistan as a candidate of Pakistan Muslim League (N) on a seat reserved for women from Punjab in the 2002 Pakistani general election.

She was re-elected to the National Assembly of Pakistan as a candidate of Pakistan Muslim League (N) on a seat reserved for women from Punjab in the 2008 Pakistani general election. She resigned from her National Assembly seat in 2012 after joining Pakistan Tehreek-e-Insaf.

== Personal life ==
She was born to politician and former federal minister Javed Hashmi.
