= Raheela Yahya Munawar =

Pakistani politician

Member of the Provincial Assembly of the Punjab
- In office June 2013 – 31 May 2018
- Constituency: Reserved seat for women

Member of the National Assembly of Pakistan
- In office 2002–2007
- Constituency: Reserved seat for women

Personal details
- Born: 10 June 1957 (age 69) Gujranwala

Raheela Yahya Munawar (Urdu: راحیلہ یحیی منور; born 10 June 1957) is a Pakistani politician who was a Member of the Provincial Assembly of the Punjab, from June 2013 to May 2018. She was a member of the National Assembly of Pakistan from 2002 to 2007.

== Early life and education ==
She was born on 10 June 1957 in Gujranwala.

She has completed graduation and earned the degree of Bachelor of Arts.

== Political career ==
She was elected to the National Assembly of Pakistan as a candidate of Pakistan Muslim League (Q) on a reserved seat for women in the 2002 Pakistani general election. In August 2003, she was appointed Parliamentary Secretary for Health.

She was elected to the Provincial Assembly of the Punjab as a candidate of Pakistan Muslim League (N) on a reserved seat for women in June 2013.
