= Sahibzada Farooq Anwar Abbasi =

Pakistani politician

Member of the National Assembly of Pakistan
- In office 1990–1999

Personal details
- Died: 4 January 2013

Sahibzada Farooq Anwar Abbasi was a Pakistani politician. He was member of the Provincial Assembly of the Punjab, National Assembly of Pakistan and of the royal family of Bahawalpur State. He died in 2013.
