= Syed Safwanullah =

Pakistani politician (1936–2020)

Syed Safwanullah (June 10, 1936 – January 5, 2020) was a member of the National Assembly of Pakistan and the Federal Minister of Housing and Works till 2007. He was a member of the Muttahida Qaumi Movement.

He died on 5 January 2020.
