= Sheikh Tariq Rasheed =

Pakistani politician

Sheikh Muhammad Tariq Rasheed (Urdu: شيخ محمد طارق رشيد, born in Multan) is a Pakistani politician who is affiliated with Pakistan Muslim League. He has previously served as a member of the National Assembly of Pakistan from 2012-2013. He was Also a Moyor of Multan from 1998-99, but Overall, that mayoral election was fraught with allegations of fraud. Mainly Saeed Chohan was leading, but late night Results in Favour of Rasheed.

== Family and education ==
He studied at Millat School Multan and Son of Sheikh Rasheed (Multan), who was a self-made trader, who Rrose in the 1985s non-party elections and served as MNA and his brother Tahir Rasheed has also served Member of National Assembly twice.

Tariq Rasheed is married and has two sons.
