= Chenab Limited =

Pakistani textile company

- Type: Public
- Traded as: PSX: CHBL
- Industry: Textile
- Founded: 1974; 52 years ago
- Founder: Haji Muhammad Saleem; Mian Muhammad Latif
- Headquarters: Nishatabad, Faisalabad, Pakistan
- Area served: Worldwide
- Key people: Mian Muhammad Latif (chairman)
- Number of employees: 12,000
- Subsidiaries: Chen One and CGI Limited UAE
- Website: chenabgroup.com

Chenab Limited, commonly known as Chenab Group (Urdu: چناب گروپ), is a Pakistani textile company based in Faisalabad. It was one of the largest exporters of home textile products from Pakistan before its default in 2013.

== History ==
It was set up in 1974 as Chenab Fabrics & Processing Mills Limited and later converted to Chenab Limited, and is traded on the Pakistan Stock Exchange. It was founded by Mian Muhammad Latif and his father, Haji Muhammad Saleem who was a cotton industrialist in Toba Tek Singh District.

Mian Muhammad Latif, the group's chairman, laid the foundation by setting up a processing unit in Faisalabad, later joined by his younger brothers, Mian Muhammad Naeem and Mian Javed Iqbal. Chenab Group soon started exporting its products worldwide and by the 1990s, it started exporting to 35 countries worldwide. Chenab is a vertically integrated unit with having complete operation range from ginning to retailing. The Group's textile mills division was listed on Karachi Stock Exchange in 2004. The Group's downfall began in 2007-8 when it sustained four billion Pakistani Rupees in losses. As per last annual report (ending June 2014), it has negative equity of Pakistani Rupees 4.7 billion and the auditors state, "in our opinion, because of the significance of the matters discussed ...the balance sheet, profit and loss account, statement of comprehensive income, cash flow statement and statement of changes in equity together with the notes forming part thereof, do not conform with approved accounting standards as applicable in Pakistan and do not give the information required by the Companies Ordinance 1984 in a manner so required and do not give a true and fair view of the state of the Companies affairs...". The last annual report also confirms that the company is in violation of the Pakistani Code of Corporate Governance, has no independent directors on its board. Its 2013 Annual report includes a statement from the company auditors that the company violates the Pakistan Code of Corporate Governance as none of the directors have attended a directors training course.

== Equipment ==
Chenab's textile unit used to process and convert more than 70 million meters of fabric every year into made-ups and garment products. Chenab is capable of producing multiple products. Chenab has 19,200 spindles at its spinning unit with in-house space of 48,000 square metres (520,000 sq ft). Chenab's weaving unit is equipped with 250 airjet looms and 380 auto-looms. Chenab's processing unit is the largest in the country with a complete processing range from dying to finishing. Chenab is also equipped with a stitching unit for ready-made garments. However, current utilization of the units is now at 25% of their capacity. To make itself more independent in generating power supply for its own units, Chenab Group has set up a 12.6 mega-watt natural-gas-based power generation facility with heat exchangers and boilers for its operation.
