= Javed Hashmi =

Pakistani politician

- جاوید ہاشمی
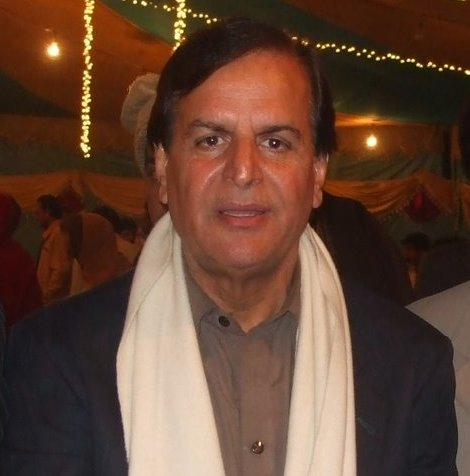
- Javed Hashmi in 2009

Minister for Environment and Conservation
- In office 17 February 1997 – 12 October 1999
- Prime Minister: Nawaz Sharif
- Deputy: Zahid Hamid (Director of the EPA)
- Preceded by: Benazir administration
- Succeeded by: Salim Saifullah Khan

Minister of National Health Services, Regulation and Coordination
- In office 17 February 1997 – 12 October 1999
- Prime Minister: Nawaz Sharif
- Preceded by: Benazir administration
- Succeeded by: Dr. Abdul Malik Kasi

Minister of State for the Ministry of Youth Affairs and Sports
- In office 26 May 1993 – 18 July 1993
- Prime Minister: Nawaz Sharif

Minister of State for the Ministry of Youth and Student Affairs
- In office 1978–1979
- President: Muhammad Zia-ul-Haq

President of Pakistan Muslim League (N)
- In office 2001–2005
- Preceded by: Kulsoom Nawaz
- Succeeded by: Nisar Ali Khan

President of Pakistan Tehreek-e-Insaf
- In office 19 March 2012 – 23 September 2014
- Preceded by: Imran Khan
- Succeeded by: Parvez Elahi

Personal details
- Born: 17 July 1947 (age 79) Multan, Punjab, Pakistan
- Party: PTI (2026–present)
- Other political affiliations: PMLN (1993-1994)
- Children: 6 including Mamoona
- Education: Punjab University (BSc, MSc, and MPhil)
- Profession: Politician, agriculturist

Makhdoom Muhammad Javed Hashmi (Urdu: جاوید ہاشمی; born 1 January 1948) is a Pakistani politician, political realist, and a senior conservative thinker on the platform of the Pakistan Tehreek-e-Insaf.

After serving as a cabinet minister in the Sharif's administrations in the 1990s, Hashmi aligned himself on the realist school of international relations and was a proponent of supporting the civilian control on the federal government and the military. After the military takeover of the government in 1999, Hashmi reportedly exposed the Pakistan Army's misadventure in Kashmir with the Indian Army when he demanded to constitute the commission to investigate the events implicated front role of the President Pervez Musharraf in 2003. Briefly sentenced to the solitary confinement by the session court in 2004 over the allegations of treason, Hashmi's sentence was overturn by the Supreme Court when it declared his case hearings as mistrial on 4 August 2007. Initially supporting the impeachment movement against Pervez Musharraf with Nawaz Sharif, he drifted apart from the PML(N) to join the Imran Khan's PTI in 2011 but was ousted after disagreeing with the demonstration against the elected government, which he viewed that it had the support from the military to destabilized the elected Sharif administration in 2014.

Without political support, Hashmi lost the byelection and went on to join the PML(N) after reconciling his differences on the policy matters with the Nawaz Sharif in 2018. Besides his political career, Hashmi is a prolific writer on geopolitics and geostrategy, and is an author of geopolitical book, "Yes! I'm a Rebel, where he successfully calculated the danger of the foreign supported homegrown terrorism in Pakistan and precisely placing a prediction on Musharraf government's weakening the state of Pakistan.

== Early life, education and student politics ==
Javed Hashmi was born into an agriculturist family on 1 January 1948 in Multan, Punjab in Pakistan. Other sources noted his birthplace in Lahore with same date and year of birth; though, he confirmed his date of birth and year as well as birthplace on 1 January 1948 in Multan. His family was known for their participation in the Pakistan Movement and was part of the Muslim League since its inception in 1906.

After his matriculation in 1968, Hashmi went to attend the Emerson College in Multan but made a transfer to the Punjab University in Lahore in 1970, where he became involved in student politics on the platform of the Islami Jamiat-e-Talaba, the student wing of the Jamaat-e-Islami– an Islamist party. In 1969, he secured his graduation from the Punjab University with BSc. in Political Science. In 1971, he graduated with MSc in political science, and later attained MPhil in same discipline from the same institution.

In 1972, he gained public notice when he led his student organization, the Islami Jamiat-e-Talaba, in protest of government minister involved in kidnapping of two girls at the Governor's House when Governor of Punjab, Ghulam Mustafa Khar, was hosting a state dinner in honor of President Zulfikar Ali Bhutto and the visiting British minister. In 1974, he ultimately led strong protests in Lahore against the decision of international recognition of Bangladesh and reportedly breached all security arrangements, to appear right in front of the motorcade of the then Saudi King Shah Faisal. During this time, Prime Minister Zulfikar Ali Bhutto offered him to be appointed on political post at the High Commission of Pakistan in London but he denied the political appointment.

== Political career ==
=== Early career ===
In 1978, Hashmi was taken in the Zia administration as the Minister of State for Youth and Student Affairs, and was the youngest minister at the age of 29. However, he later expressed his uncomfortableness with working with the uniform officials and soon departed from the administration where he began practicing law at the Lahore High Court while filling the role of agriculturist at his family farms.

=== Politics and ministries in Sharif administrations: 1985–1999 ===
During the nationwide general elections held in 1985, Hashmi returned to the national politics and successfully participated for NA-149 (Multan-II) constituency on the platform of Pakistan Muslim League (PML). In 1988, he sided with the conservative faction led by its President Fida Mohammad as opposed to nationalist faction led by then-Prime Minister Mohammad Junejo. Hashmi successfully defended his NA-149 (Multan-II) constituency during the general elections held in 1988 and 1990. During this time, Hashmi was elevated as the Minister of State for Youth Affairs in the first administration of Prime Minister Nawaz Sharif.

In 1993, his name was subsequently reported in the financial scandal revealed by the Federal Investigation Agency when the agency interrogated Younis Habib, the accountant with the Ministry of Defence. He later expressed his regret and grief when he testified his acceptance of financial endowment from accountant Younis Habib in 1993.

During the general elections held in 1997, Hashmi again defended his NA-149 (Multan-II) constituency and was elevated as the Minister of Health and Minister for Environment in the second administration of Prime Minister Nawaz Sharif, and paid the state visit to Morocco in 1999. In 1998, he visited Switzerland to attend the environmental and climate change conference but immediately return to Pakistan after learning of India's nuclear tests in Rajasthan. In an attendance NSC meeting with Prime Minister Nawaz Sharif, Hashmi became a war hawk and greatly spoke in favor of decision-making process of authorizing the nuclear weapons-testing, which eventually, Pakistan conducted out six nuclear weapons-testing in May 1998. At the session at the Parliament, Hashmi reportedly led a celebration while loudly chairing and tapping from his parliament desk: "Yes! Yes!.... We have done it.!"

His tenure was abruptly ended when then-Chairman joint chiefs General Pervez Musharraf went onto impose martial law against Prime Minister Nawaz Sharif in 1999, and was appointed as Party President of Pakistan Muslim League (N), which he tenured until 2005.

=== PML(N)'s presidency, dissenting, and imprisonment: 1999–2008 ===
After the martial law against Prime Minister Nawaz Sharif in 1999, Hashmi became a vocal critic of former President Pervez Musharraf and strongly advocated for the strong civilian control of the military. In 2001–04, Hashmi reportedly appealed to the Commonwealth of Nations and the European Union to play a significant political role to restore the civilian control of the federal government in Pakistan. In 2001, an inquiry against his role in the Mehrangate scandal was opened by the National Accountability Bureau (NAB) but was unable to produce any substantial evidence against him in the accountability courts.

In 2001, Hashmi led the strong conservative demonstration against President Pervez Musharraf's geostrategy on the war on terror that led to the U.S. invasion in Afghanistan. During this time, Shuja'at Hussain, the head of the PML(Q) supporting President Musharraf, made an unsuccessful attempt to recruiting him and Nisar Ali Khan into his faction to provide political advocacy for President Musharraf in 2002. In 2002, the PML(N) announced to participate in the nationwide general elections with Hashmi earning the combined nomination from the Opposition alliance in the Parliament for the Prime Ministership against Mir Zafarullah Jamali of the PML(Q); Hashmi later conceded his defeat in the elections due to counting of the electoral college.

On 20 October 2003, Hashmi reportedly exposed the ethical and monetary corruption in the Pakistani military when he read the letter signed by several active-duty military officers in the Army GHQ in Rawalpindi. He immediately demanded for an active criminal investigations against the chief of army staff and criticisized President Pervez Musharraf for his presidential campaign while in the military uniform. On 29 October 2003, Lt-Gen. Shahid Aziz ordered the NAB agents to detained him from the Parliament Building, and was later taken in to custody by the Military Police on charges of inciting mutiny leveled by President Pervez Musharraf. Hearings of his trials were held in the Adiala Prison and the session court at the Lahore High Court, which raised doubts among human rights groups about its fairness. On 12 April 2004, he was sentenced to 23 years in prison for inciting mutiny in the military, forgery, and defamation.

The verdict was widely criticized in Pakistan and was considered as a wilful miscarriage of justice by the Musharraf administration, and the ARD and the MMA termed this verdict to be politically motivated by the ruling junta with malicious intent, declaring him to be a political prisoner. He was transferred and held in the Central Jail Lahore where he penned and authored a critically acclaimed political book, Haan Mein Baghi Hun! (lit. Yes, I am Rebel!) where he exposed the military's intervention in the politics and the foreign relations with the United States. He also authored the Takhtaey-e-Daar Kay Saaey Talay (lit. Under the shadow of Hanging board).

On 3 August 2007, a three-member bench of the Supreme Court of Pakistan under Chief Justice Iftikhar Chaudhry granted him bail after serving approximately three and a half years in prison. On 4 August 2007, Hashmi, with among PML(N) leaders, were released but again placed under arrest at the declaration of a state of emergency on 3 November 2007.

=== Parliamentary politics, joining and dismissal from PTI (2008–14) ===
During the general elections held in 2008, Hashmi successfully defended the NA-55 (Rawalpindi-VI) constituency where he notably defeated PML(Q)'s Rashid Ahmed but decided to retain his NA-148 Constituency against the wishes of Nawaz Sharif. He spoke against of the strategic partnership act offered by the United States, and released a very strong reaction on Inter Services Public Relations, which he termed the Kerry-Lugar Bill, an interference on part of Americans in country's intelligence community. He reported quoted: "if there is anything that needs to be corrected, Pakistan will do it herself. Pakistan Army should stay within its limits,... We will protect our military if it ensures playing the role assigned to it." Over the issue of the Memogate scandal that implicated the former President Asif Ali Zardari and Parliament's failure for its investigation, Hashmi reportedly Hashmi submitted his resignation from Parliament, claiming that "this parliament is a dummy and not passing real legislation" on 7 May 2011.

On 24 December 2011, Hashmi reportedly cut his ties from the PML(N) and joined the PTI and addressed a rally in support of Imran Khan in Karachi on 25 December 2011. Though, he also warned Imran Khan of his dissenting approach if Imran Khan did not deliver his party's manifesto as promised to the voters. During the general elections held in 2013, Hashmi successfully defended the NA-48 in Islamabad, and NA-149 in Multan on PTI's platform but later relinquished the NA-48 in favor of PTI's worker. He stood against Nawaz Sharif's candidacy in the National Assembly when the vote of confidence measure took place, and reportedly spoke in favor of Nawaz Sharif where he reportedly quoted in the televised conference: "Political differences aside, Nawaz is my political leader and will remain so." His views subsequently blacklashed the party and was said to be at odds with core of the leadership of the PTI, Imran Khan, the chairman, Mehmood Qureshi, Vice-chairman, and Jehangir Tarin, the Secretary-General.

On 14 August 2014, Hashmi voiced serious and irreconcilable concerns when Imran Khan decided to lead a massive protests against alleged rigging in the general elections when the decision towards the Dharna at the Constitution Avenue in Islamabad; though he decided to address the march on Khan's request. On 31 August 2014, Hashmi left the party in distraught and in anger when the Imran Khan's march attacked the media reporters and was violently moved towards the Prime Minister's Secretariat under Khan's orders. On 1 September 2014, Hashmi accused the Pakistan Army of destabilizing the civilian writ of Sharif administration and wasn't well received by Imran Khan who later issued the show cause notice which results in Hashmi leaving the PTI. The PTI later refused to accept his resignation instead Imran Khan ousted him from the party on 26 September 2014.

=== Rejoining PML(N) and political positions: 2018–present ===
On 12 May 2018, Hashmi, along with his daughter, Mamoona Hashmi met with Nawaz Sharif and announced to rejoin the PML(N) after reconciling the party policy differences with Nawaz Sharif. At this meeting, Hashmi spoke very high of Nawaz Sharif's services done to the country, and reportedly praised his elder daughter, Momoona, and Sharif's daughter, Mary'am, of supporting the political program of the party.

== Political views ==
In 1987, Hashmi successfully predicted the Russian troops retreat from Afghanistan and warming of the Indo-U.S. relations at the expense of Pakistan. He reportedly disagreed with the Pakistan's policy on the Soviet Union, and called for strengthening relations with Russia.

In his book, I'm a Rebel, Hasmi is of the view towards the national conservatism and wrote a critical view on the performance military governments in Pakistan which have harmed the solidarity of his country and over dependence towards the United States for the political support for their regimes— in desperate for political legitimacy without public approvals, (military) presidents often desperately negotiate with India without formal agenda to seek peace in the region. After learning the news of the terrorist attacks in New York in 2001, Hashmi successfully calculated of imprisonment of PML(N)'s leadership and Musharraf's providing military bases to the United States invasion of Afghanistan, and calculated precisely of Indian support for terrorist organizations in the Western Pakistan. While he sided and agreed with Prime Minister Sharif's policy on India, Hashmi demanded an investigative commission against Chairman joint chiefs Gen. Pervez Musharraf over the Kargil debacle and the self-coup staged by the latter and gave strong criticism to the Lt-Gen. Ehsan ul Haq for his attempts to control the democracy.

== Personal life and health ==
Javed Hashmi's elder daughter, Mamoona Hashmi, is a senior leader and has served as the member of parliament on the PML(N)'s platform. His younger daughter, Bushra, is not active in politics. On 20 July 2010, Hashmi was hospitalised at Nishtar Hospital after he suffered Brain Hemorrhage, and his body also suffered stroke due to internal bleeding. He was later admitted at the General Hospital for minor fever. Though, his CT angiography reports came out normal.

== Books ==
- ىاں! ميں باغىى ہوں (Yes! I am Rebel), Lahore: Sagar Publications, 2005, 409 p.
- تختہ دار کے سائے تلے (Under the Shadows of Gallows), Lahore: Jahangir Books Publications, 2007, 311 p.

== See also ==
- Democratic movements in Pakistan
  - Civilian control of the military
  - Civil-military relations
  - Khakistocracy
  - Movement to impeach Pervez Musharraf
  - General Musharraf vs. Federation of Pakistan, et al.
- Post Cold War era
- Conservatism in Pakistan
