= List of members of the 11th National Assembly of Pakistan =

11th National Assembly
←	10th National Assembly	12th National Assembly	→
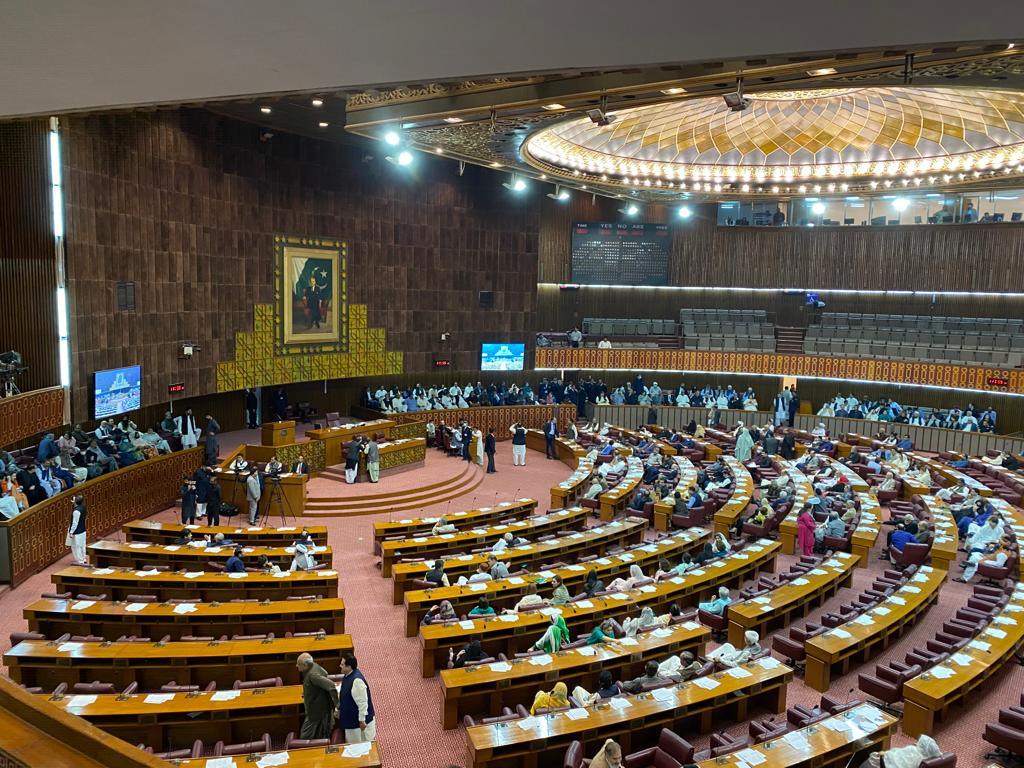

Overview
- Legislative body: National Assembly of Pakistan
- Jurisdiction: Pakistan
- Meeting place: Parliament House, Islamabad-44030
- Term: 1997 – 1999
- Election: 1997 Pakistani general election
- Government: Government of Pakistan
- Website: Official website

National Assembly of Pakistan
- Members: 216
- Speaker: Elahi Bux Soomro
- Prime Minister: Nawaz Sharif
- Leader of the Opposition: Benazir Bhutto
- President: Farooq Leghari (1997) Rafiq Tarar (1998–1999)

Party	Seats	Party	Seats
PML (N)	137	ANP	9
PPP	18	PPP(SB)	1
MQM/HPG	12	BNP	3
JUI (F)	2	NPP	1
JWP	2	Minority	10
IND	21	Others	0
Vacant	1	Total = 216	

The 11th National Assembly of Pakistan was the legislature of Pakistan following the 1997 general election of members of parliament (MPs) or Member of the National Assembly of Pakistan (MNA) to the National Assembly of Pakistan, the lower house of the bicameral Majlis-e-Shura. The National Assembly of Pakistan is a democratically elected body currently made up of 342 members, known as Members of the National Assembly (MNAs), of which 272 are elected directly, however the political parties are allotted 70 reserved seats for women and religious minorities in accordance with their share of the total vote.

For 11th National Assembly of Pakistan, Pakistan held general elections to choose the members of the National Assembly on February 3, 1997. After President Farooq Leghari ousted the previous PPP government over issues of national security, elections were held.

The Pakistan Muslim League(N), which at the time garnered the most votes ever obtained by an opposition party, won by a landslide 2/3 as a result. For the first time, the PML-N won an election on its own without forming an alliance. After that, Nawaz Sharif was elected to a second non-consecutive term as prime minister. In the meantime, Benazir Bhutto's declining popularity caused the Pakistan People Party to be completely defeated, losing 71 seats and winning only 18. There was only a 36.0% voter turnout.

After formation of government, the National Assembly of Pakistan was elected Ellahi Bukhsh Soomro for the Speaker of National Assembly of Pakistan from 16 February 1997 to 20 August 2001.

== Members ==
Note: Below are the election constituencies of 1997 general election and do not link with latest election constituencies as they are completely changed.

Region	Constituency	Member	Political party	Assumed office	Ref.
KPK	NA-1 (Peshawar-I)	Ghulam Ahmed Bilour	ANP	15 February 1997	
KPK	NA-2 (Peshawar-II)	Arbab M. Jahangir Khan	ANP	15 February 1997	
KPK	NA-3 (Peshawar-III)	Arbab Saadullah Khan	ANP	15 February 1997	
KPK	NA-4 (Peshawar-IV)	Wali Muhammad Khan	PPP	15 February 1997	
KPK	NA-5 (Charsadda)	Asfand Yar Wali	ANP	15 February 1997	
KPK	NA-6 (Mardan-I)	Naseem-ur-Rehman	ANP	15 February 1997	
KPK	NA-7 (Mardan-II)	Muhammad Azam Khan Hoti	ANP	15 February 1997	
KPK	NA-8 (Swabi)	Haji Rehmanullah	ANP	15 February 1997	
KPK	NA-9 (Kohat)	Javed Ibrahim Paracha	PML (N)	15 February 1997	
KPK	NA-10 (Karak)	Shams-ur Rehman Khattak	ANP	15 February 1997	
KPK	NA-11 (Abbottabad-I)	Sardar Fida M. Khan	PML (N)	15 February 1997	
KPK	NA-12 (Abbottabad-II)	Mian M. Nawaz Sharif	PML (N)	15 February 1997	
KPK	NA-13 (Abbottabad-III)	Gohar Ayub Khan	PML (N)	15 February 1997	
KPK	NA-14 (Mansehra-I)	Sardar M. Yousuf	PML (N)	15 February 1997	
KPK	NA-15 (Mansehra-II)	Nawabzada Salahuddin Saeed	PML (N)	15 February 1997	
KPK	NA-16 (Mansehra-III)	M. Nawaz Allai	PML (N)	15 February 1997	
KPK	NA-17 (Kohistan)	Aurangzeb	Independent	15 February 1997	
KPK	NA-18 (Dera Ismail Khan)	Sardar Umar Farooq Khan	PML (N)	15 February 1997	
KPK	NA-19 (Bannu-I)	Malik Nasir Khan	PML (N)	15 February 1997	
KPK	NA-20 (Bannu-II)	Haji M. Kabir Khan	PML (N)	15 February 1997	
KPK	NA-21 (Swat-I)	Adnan Aurangzeb	PML (N)	15 February 1997	
KPK	NA-22 (Swat-II)	Shujaat Ali Khan	PML (N)	15 February 1997	
KPK	NA-23 (Swat-III)	Abdul Matin Khan	ANP	15 February 1997	
KPK	NA-24 (Chitral)	Shahzada Mohiuddin	PML (N)	15 February 1997	
KPK	NA-25 (Dir)	Haji Inayat Khan	PML (N)	15 February 1997	
KPK	NA-26 (Malakand)	Muhammad Khan	PML (N)	15 February 1997	
KPK	NA-27 (FATA-I)	Haji Baroz Khan	Independent	15 February 1997	
KPK	NA-28 (FATA-II)	Haji Zarin Khan Mangal	Independent	15 February 1997	
KPK	NA-29 (FATA-III)	Syed Munir Sayed	Independent	15 February 1997	
KPK	NA-30 (FATA-IV)	Maulana Muhammad Din Dar	Independent	15 February 1997	
KPK	NA-31 (FATA-V)	Maulana Noor Muhammad	Independent	15 February 1997	
KPK	NA-32 (FATA-VI)	Haji Lal Karim	Independent	15 February 1997	
KPK	NA-33 (FATA-VII)	Abdul Latif Afridi	Independent	15 February 1997	
KPK	NA-34 (FATA-VIII)	Haji Baz Gul Afridi	Independent	15 February 1997	
Islamabad	NA-35 (Islamabad-I)	Syed Zafar Ali Shah	PML (N)	15 February 1997	
Punjab	NA-36 (Rawalpindi-I)	Shahid Khaqan Abbassi	PML (N)	15 February 1997	
Punjab	NA-37 (Rawalpindi-II)	Ch. Khurshid Zaman	PML (N)	15 February 1997	
Punjab	NA-38 (Rawalpindi-III)	Shaikh Rasheed Ahmed	PML (N)	15 February 1997	
Punjab	NA-39 (Rawalpindi-IV)	Muhammad Ijaz-ul-Haq	PML (N)	15 February 1997	
Punjab	NA-40 (Rawalpindi-V)	Nisar Ali Khan	PML (N)	15 February 1997	
Punjab	NA-41 (Attock-I)	Shaikh Aftab Ahmed	PML (N)	15 February 1997	
Punjab	NA-42 (Attock-II)	Malik Lal Khan	PML (N)	15 February 1997	
Punjab	NA-43 (Chakwal-I)	Lt. Gen. (R) Malik Abdul Majeed	PML (N)	15 February 1997	
Punjab	NA-44 (Chakwal-II)	Sardar Mansoor Hayat Tamman	PML (N)	15 February 1997	
Punjab	NA-45 (Jhelum-I)	Raja Muhammad Afzal Khan	PML (N)	15 February 1997	
Punjab	NA-46 (Jhelum-II)	Nawabzada Iqbal Mehdi	PML (N)	15 February 1997	
Punjab	NA-47 (Sargodha-I)	Malik Adnan Hayat Khan Noon	PML (N)	15 February 1997	
Punjab	NA-48 (Sargodha-II)	Ghias Mela	PML (N)	15 February 1997	
Punjab	NA-49 (Sargodha-III)	Abdul Hameed	PML (N)	15 February 1997	
Punjab	NA-50 (Sargodha-IV)	Anwar Ali Cheema	PML (N)	15 February 1997	
Punjab	NA-51 (Khushab-I)	Malik Umar Khan	PML (N)	15 February 1997	
Punjab	NA-52 (Khushab-II)	Sardar Shuja M. Khan Baloch	PML (N)	15 February 1997	
Punjab	NA-53 (Mianwali-I)	Maqbool Ahmed Khan Niazi	PML (N)	15 February 1997	
Punjab	NA-54 (Mianwali-II)	Inam-ullah Khan Niazi	PML (N)	15 February 1997	
Punjab	NA-55 (Bhakkar-I)	Khan Muhammad Asghar Khan	Independent	15 February 1997	
Punjab	NA-56 (Bhakkar-II)	M. Zafar-ullah Khan Dhandla	PML (N)	15 February 1997	
Punjab	NA-57 (Faisalabad-I)	Rana Zahid Tuseef	PML (N)	15 February 1997	
Punjab	NA-58 (Faisalabad-II)	Rai Salah-ud-Din	PML (N)	15 February 1997	
Punjab	NA-59 (Faisalabad-III)	Mian Nasir Ali Baluch	PML (N)	15 February 1997	
Punjab	NA-60 (Faisalabad-IV)	Ch. Safdar Rehman	PML (N)	15 February 1997	
Punjab	NA-61 (Faisalabad-V)	Mian M. Farooq	PML (N)	15 February 1997	
Punjab	NA-62 (Faisalabad-VI)	Raja Nadir Pervez	PML (N)	15 February 1997	
Punjab	NA-63 (Faisalabad-VII)	Muhammad Akram Ansari	PML (N)	15 February 1997	
Punjab	NA-64 (Faisalabad-VIII)	Sher Ali	PML (N)	15 February 1997	
Punjab	NA-65 (Faisalabad-IX)	Mian Abdul Mannan	PML (N)	15 February 1997	
Punjab	NA-66 (Jhang-I)	Qaisar Ahmed Sheikh	Independent	15 February 1997	
Punjab	NA-67 (Jhang-II)	Maulana M. Rehmatullah	PML (N)	15 February 1997	
Punjab	NA-68 (Jhang-III)	Nawab Amanullah Khan Sial	PML (N)	15 February 1997	
Punjab	NA-69 (Jhang-IV)	Syeda Abida Hussain	PML (N)	15 February 1997	
Punjab	NA-70 (Jhang-V)	Sahibzada M. Tahir Sultan	PML (N)	15 February 1997	
Punjab	NA-71 (Toba Tek Singh-I)	Ch.Asad-urRehman	PML (N)	15 February 1997	
Punjab	NA-72 (Toba Tek Singh-II)	Ch. Abdul Sattar	PML (N)	15 February 1997	
Punjab	NA-73 (Toba Tek Singh-III)	Mr. Hamza	PML (N)	15 February 1997	
Punjab	NA-74 (Gujranwala-I)	Col (R) Ghulam Sarwar Cheema	PML (N)	15 February 1997	
Punjab	NA-75 (Gujranwala-II)	Afzal Hussain Tarar	PML (N)	15 February 1997	
Punjab	NA-76 (Gujranwala-III)	Ghulam Dastgir Khan	PML (N)	15 February 1997	
Punjab	NA-77 (Gujranwala-IV)	Ch. Mahmood Bashir Virk	PML (N)	15 February 1997	
Punjab	NA-78 (Gujranwala-V)	Rana Nazir Ahmed Khan	PML (N)	15 February 1997	
Punjab	NA-79 (Gujranwala-VI)	* Ch. Ahmed Raza (Note: Was elected in by-election after seat become vacant.)	PML (N)	15 February 1997	
Punjab	NA-80 (Gujrat-I)	Mubasher Hussain	PML (N)	15 February 1997	
Punjab	NA-81 (Gujrat-II)	Ch. Shujat Hussain	PML (N)	15 February 1997	
Punjab	NA-82 (Gujrat-III)	Syed Manzoor Hussain Shah	PML (N)	15 February 1997	
Punjab	NA-83 (Gujrat-IV)	Mumtaz Ahmed Tarar	PML (N)	15 February 1997	
Punjab	NA-84 (Gujrat-V)	Ch. M. Iqbal Bosal	PML (N)	15 February 1997	
Punjab	NA-85 (Sialkot-I)	Khawaja M. Asif	PML (N)	15 February 1997	
Punjab	NA-86 (Sialkot-II)	Ch. Amir Hussain	PML (N)	15 February 1997	
Punjab	NA-87 (Sialkot-III)	Syed Iftikhar-ul-Hassan Shah	PML (N)	15 February 1997	
Punjab	NA-88 (Sialkot-IV)	Ch. Sikandar Hayat Malhi	PML (N)	15 February 1997	
Punjab	NA-89 (Sialkot-V)	Ch. M. Sarwar Khan	PML (N)	15 February 1997	
Punjab	NA-90 (Sialkot-VI)	Ahsan Iqbal	PML (N)	15 February 1997	
Punjab	NA-91 (Sialkot-VII)	Danial Aziz	Independent	15 February 1997	
Punjab	NA-92 (Lahore-I)	Mian M. Azhar	PML (N)	15 February 1997	
Punjab	NA-93 (Lahore-II)	Mian Abdul Waheed	PML (N)	15 February 1997	
Punjab	NA-94 (Lahore-III)	Tariq Aziz	PML (N)	15 February 1997	
Punjab	NA-95 (Lahore-IV)	M. Pervaiz Malik	PML (N)	15 February 1997	
Punjab	NA-96 (Lahore-V)	Kamil Ali Agha	PML (N)	15 February 1997	
Punjab	NA-97 (Lahore-VI)	Muhammad Ishaq Dar	PML (N)	15 February 1997	
Punjab	NA-98 (Lahore-VII)	Mian M. Munir	PML (N)	15 February 1997	
Punjab	NA-99 (Lahore-VIII)	Sardar Kamil Uma	PML (N)	15 February 1997	
Punjab	NA-100 (Lahore-IX)	Ch. M. Ashiq Dayal	PML (N)	15 February 1997	
Punjab	NA-101 (Sheikhupura-I)	Rana Tanveer Hussain	PML (N)	15 February 1997	
Punjab	NA-102 (Sheikhupura-II)	* Mrs. Khurshid Mehmood Khan	PML (N)	15 February 1997	
Punjab	NA-103 (Sheikhupura-III)	Ch. M. Barjees Tahir	PML (N)	15 February 1997	
Punjab	NA-104 (Sheikhupura-IV)	Ch. Naeem Hussain Chattha	PML (N)	15 February 1997	
Punjab	NA-105 (Sheikhupura-V)	Rai Mansab Ali Khan	PML (N)	15 February 1997	
Punjab	NA-106 (Kasur-I)	Mian Khurshid Mehmood Kasuri	PML (N)	15 February 1997	
Punjab	NA-107 (Kasur-II)	Ch. M. Hanif Khan	PML (N)	15 February 1997	
Punjab	NA-108 (Kasur-III)	Rana M. Hayat Khan	PML (N)	15 February 1997	
Punjab	NA-109 (Kasur-IV)	Maulana Moeenud-Din Lakhv	PML (N)	15 February 1997	
Punjab	NA-110 (Okara-I)	Mian M. Zaman	PML (N)	15 February 1997	
Punjab	NA-111 (Okara-II)	Syed Sajjad Haider	PML (N)	15 February 1997	
Punjab	NA-112 (Okara-III)	Rao Qaiser Ali Khan	PML (N)	15 February 1997	
Punjab	NA-113 (Okara-IV)	Mian M. Yasin Khan Wattoo	PML (N)	15 February 1997	
Punjab	NA-114 (Multan-I)	Sikandar Hayat Khan Bosan	PML (N)	15 February 1997	
Punjab	NA-115 (Multan-II)	Haji M. Boota	PML (N)	15 February 1997	
Punjab	NA-116 (Multan-III)	Shaikh M. Tahir Rasheed	PML (N)	15 February 1997	
Punjab	NA-117 (Multan-IV)	Ghulam Qasim Khan	PML (N)	15 February 1997	
Punjab	NA-118 (Multan-V)	M. Siddique Khan Kanju	PML (N)	15 February 1997	
Punjab	NA-119 (Multan-VI)	Syed Javaid Ali Shah	PML (N)	15 February 1997	
Punjab	NA-120 (Khanewal-I)	M. Javaid Hashmi	PML (N)	15 February 1997	
Punjab	NA-121 (Khanewal-II)	Syed Fakhar Imam	PML (N)	15 February 1997	
Punjab	NA-122 (Khanewal-III)	Aftab Ahmed Khan Daha	PML (N)	15 February 1997	
Punjab	NA-123 (Khanewal-IV)	Begum Majida Wayne	PML (N)	15 February 1997	
Punjab	NA-124 (Sahiwal-I)	Mian Anwar-ulHaq Ramay	PML (N)	15 February 1997	
Punjab	NA-125 (Sahiwal-II)	Ch. M. Ashraf	PML (N)	15 February 1997	
Punjab	NA-126 (Sahiwal-III)	Rai Ahmed Nawaz Khan	PML (N)	15 February 1997	
Punjab	NA-127 (Sahiwal-IV)	Raja Shahid Saeed Khan	PML (N)	15 February 1997	
Punjab	NA-128 (Sahiwal-V)	Mahmood Ahmed Khan	PML (N)	15 February 1997	
Punjab	NA-129 (Vehari-I)	M. Nawaz Khan	PML (N)	15 February 1997	
Punjab	NA-130 (Vehari-II)	Ms. Tehmina Daultana	PML (N)	15 February 1997	
Punjab	NA-131 (Vehari-III)	Syed Shahid Mehdi Nasim	PML (N)	15 February 1997	
Punjab	NA-132 (D G Khan-I)	Sardar M. Amjad Farooq	PML (N)	15 February 1997	
Punjab	NA-133 (D G Khan-II)	Sardar M. Jaffar Khan Leghari	Independent	15 February 1997	
Punjab	NA-134 (Rajanpur)	Sardar M. Nasrullah Khan Dreshak	Independent	15 February 1997	
Punjab	NA-135 (Muzaffargarh-I)	Syed Jamil Ahmad Hussain Bokhari	PML (N)	15 February 1997	
Punjab	NA-136 (Muzaffargarh-II)	Mian Atta M. Qureshi	PML (N)	15 February 1997	
Punjab	NA-137 (Muzaffargarh-III)	Ghulam Noor Rabbani Khar	PML (N)	15 February 1997	
Punjab	NA-138 (Muzaffargarh-IV)	Mian Ghulam Abbas	PML (N)	15 February 1997	
Punjab	NA-139 (Layyah-I)	Ghulam Haider Thind	PML (N)	15 February 1997	
Punjab	NA-140 (Layyah-II)	Sahibzada Faizul-Hasan	PML (N)	15 February 1997	
Punjab	NA-141 (Bahawalpur-I)	Nawab Salahuddin	PML (N)	15 February 1997	
Punjab	NA-142 (Bahawalpur-II)	Sahibzada Farooq Anwar Abbasi	PML (N)	15 February 1997	
Punjab	NA-143 (Bahawalpur-III)	M. Aqeel-urRehman	PML (N)	15 February 1997	
Punjab	NA-144 (Bahawalnagar-I)	Prof. Dr. Noor M. Ghifari	PML (N)	15 February 1997	
Punjab	NA-145 (Bahawalnagar-II)	Mian Abdul Sattar Laleka	PML (N)	15 February 1997	
Punjab	NA-146 (Bahawalnagar-III)	Ch. Abdul Ghafoor	PML (N)	15 February 1997	
Punjab	NA-147 (Rahim Yar Khan-I)	Makhdoom Syed Ahmed Mahmood	PML (N)	15 February 1997	
Punjab	NA-148 (Rahim Yar Khan-II)	Makhdoom Immad-ud-Din	PML (N)	15 February 1997	
Punjab	NA-149 (Rahim Yar Khan-III)	Ch. M. Jaffar Iqbal	PML (N)	15 February 1997	
Punjab	NA-150 (Rahim Yar Khan-IV)	Humayun Akhtar Khan	PML (N)	15 February 1997	
Sindh	NA-151 (Sukkur-I)	Syed Khurshed Ahmed Shah	PPP	15 February 1997	
Sindh	NA-152 (Sukkur-II)	Ali M. Khan Mahar	PPP	15 February 1997	
Sindh	NA-153 (Sukkur-III)	Khalid Ahmed Khan Lund	PPP	15 February 1997	
Sindh	NA-154 (Shikarpur-I)	Aftab Shahban Mirani	PPP	15 February 1997	
Sindh	NA-155 (Shikarpur-II)	Ghaus Bux Khan Mahar	PML (N)	15 February 1997	
Sindh	NA-156 (Jacobabad-I)	Illahi Bukhsh Soomor	PML (N)	15 February 1997	
Sindh	NA-157 (Jacobabad-I)	Mir Hazar Khan Bijrani	PPP(SB)	15 February 1997	
Sindh	NA-158 (Nawabshah-I)	Ghulam Mustafa Khan Jatoi	NPP	15 February 1997	
Sindh	NA-159 (Nawabshah-II)	Asghar Ali Shah	PML (N)	15 February 1997	
Sindh	NA-160 (Nawabshah-III)	Syed Shaukat Hussain Shah	PML (N)	15 February 1997	
Sindh	NA-161 (Nawabshah-IV)	Syed Shabbir Ahmed Shah	PML (N)	15 February 1997	
Sindh	NA-162 (Khairpur-I)	Justice ® Syed Ghous Ali Shah	PML (N)	15 February 1997	
Sindh	NA-163 (Khairpur-II)	Pir Syed Fazal Ali Shah Jillani	PPP	15 February 1997	
Sindh	NA-164 (Larkana-I)	Begum Nusrat Bhutto	PPP	15 February 1997	
Sindh	NA-165 (Larkana-II)	Shabbir Ahmed Khan Chandio	PPP	15 February 1997	
Sindh	NA-166 (Larkana-III)	Mrs. Benazir Bhutto	PPP	15 February 1997	
Sindh	NA-167 (Hyderabad-I)	Makhdoom M. Amin Faheem	PPP	15 February 1997	
Sindh	NA-168 (Hyderabad-II)	Tariq Javed	HPG	15 February 1997	
Sindh	NA-169 (Hyderabad-III)	Dr. Khalid Maqbool Siddiqui	HPG	15 February 1997	
Sindh	NA-170 (Hyderabad-IV)	Syed Naveed Qamar	PPP	15 February 1997	
Sindh	NA-171 (Hyderabad-V)	Syed Ali Nawaz Shah	PPP	15 February 1997	
Sindh	NA-172 (Badin-I)	Abdul Sattar Leghari	PPP	15 February 1997	
Sindh	NA-173 (Badin-II)	Dr. Fehmida Mirza	PPP	15 February 1997	
Sindh	NA-174 (Tharparkar-I)	Pir Aftab Hussain Jillani	PPP	15 February 1997	
Sindh	NA-175 (Tharparkar-II)	Pir Noor M. Shah Jillani	PML (N)	15 February 1997	
Sindh	NA-176 (Tharparkar-III)	Dr. Arbab Ghulam Rahim	Independent	15 February 1997	
Sindh	NA-177 (Dadu-I)	Pir Bux Khaskheli	Independent	15 February 1997	
Sindh	NA-178 (Dadu-II)	Haji M. Bux Jamali	PPP	15 February 1997	
Sindh	NA-179 (Dadu-III)	Abdul Hamid Jatoi	PML (N)	15 February 1997	
Sindh	NA-180 (Sanghar-I)	Haji Pir Bakhsh Junejo	Independent	15 February 1997	
Sindh	NA-181 (Sanghar-II)	Jam Mashooq Ali	Independent	15 February 1997	
Sindh	NA-182 (Thatta-I)	Baboo Ghulam Hussain	PPP	15 February 1997	
Sindh	NA-183 (Thatta-II)	Syed Shafqat Hussain Shah	PPP	15 February 1997	
Sindh	NA-184 (Karachi West-I)	Mian Ejaz Ahmed Shafi	PML (N)	15 February 1997	
Sindh	NA-185 (Karachi West-II)	Prof. A.K. Shams	HPG	15 February 1997	
Sindh	NA-186 (Karachi Central-I)	Kunwar Khalid Younus	HPG	15 February 1997	
Sindh	NA-187 (Karachi Central-II)	M. Farooq Ahmad	HPG	15 February 1997	
Sindh	NA-188 (Karachi Central-III)	Hasan Musanna Alvi	HPG	15 February 1997	
Sindh	NA-189 (Karachi South-I)	Waja Ahmed Karim Dad Boluch	PPP	15 February 1997	
Sindh	NA-190 (Karachi South-II)	Babar Khan Ghori	HPG	15 February 1997	
Sindh	NA-191 (Karachi South-III)	Capt. Haleem Ahmed Siddiqui	PML (N)	15 February 1997	
Sindh	NA-192 (Karachi East-I)	Ajaz Mahmood	HPG	15 February 1997	
Sindh	NA-193 (Karachi East-II)	Dr.Nishat Mallick	HPG	15 February 1997	
Sindh	NA-194 (Karachi East-III)	M. Arif Khan Advocate	HPG	15 February 1997	
Sindh	NA-195 (Karachi East-IV)	Shaikh Liaquat Hussain	HPG	15 February 1997	
Sindh	NA-196 (Karachi East-V)	M. Farrukh Naeem Siddiqui	HPG	15 February 1997	
Balochistan	NA-197 (Quetta)	Sardar Atif Ali Sanjarani	PML (N)	15 February 1997	
Balochistan	NA-198 (Pishin)	Al-Haj Maulana Abdul Ghani	JUI(F)	15 February 1997	
Balochistan	NA-199 (Loralai)	Sardar M. Yaqub Khan Nasir	PML (N)	15 February 1997	
Balochistan	NA-200 (Zhob)	Maulana M. Khan Sheerani	JUI(F)	15 February 1997	
Balochistan	NA-201 (Kachhi)	Sardar Yar M. Rind	JWP	15 February 1997	
Balochistan	NA-202 (Sibbi, Kohlu, Dera Bugti, Ziarat)	Nawab M. Akbar Khan Bugti	JWP	15 February 1997	
Balochistan	NA-203 (Jaffarabad)	Mir Faridullah Khan Jamali	Independent	15 February 1997	
Balochistan	NA-204 (Kalat, Kharan)	Waja Sanaullah Baloch	BNP	15 February 1997	
Balochistan	NA-205 (Khuzdar)	Mir Hasil Khan Bezenjo	BNP	15 February 1997	
Balochistan	NA-206 (Lasbela, Gwadar)	Jam M. Yousaf	PML (N)	15 February 1997	
Balochistan	NA-207 (Turbat, Panjgur)	Shakeel Ahmad Baloch	BNP	15 February 1997	

== Membership changes ==
Region	Constituency	Member	Political party	Note	Ref.
Punjab	NA-79 (Gujranwala-VI)	* Ch. Ijaz Ahmed	PML (N)	Elected in Feb 1997 and died while in office.	
Punjab	NA-102 (Sheikhupura-II)	* Mehmood Akbar	PML (N)	Elected in Feb 1997 and died while in office.	

== See also ==
- List of members of the 1st National Assembly of Pakistan
- List of members of the 2nd National Assembly of Pakistan
- List of members of the 3rd National Assembly of Pakistan
- List of members of the 4th National Assembly of Pakistan
- List of members of the 5th National Assembly of Pakistan
- List of members of the 6th National Assembly of Pakistan
- List of members of the 7th National Assembly of Pakistan
- List of members of the 8th National Assembly of Pakistan
- List of members of the 9th National Assembly of Pakistan
- List of members of the 10th National Assembly of Pakistan
- List of members of the 11th National Assembly of Pakistan
- List of members of the 12th National Assembly of Pakistan
- List of members of the 13th National Assembly of Pakistan
- List of members of the 14th National Assembly of Pakistan
- List of members of the 15th National Assembly of Pakistan
