= Member of Parliament (Pakistan) =

Member of Pakistani Parliament

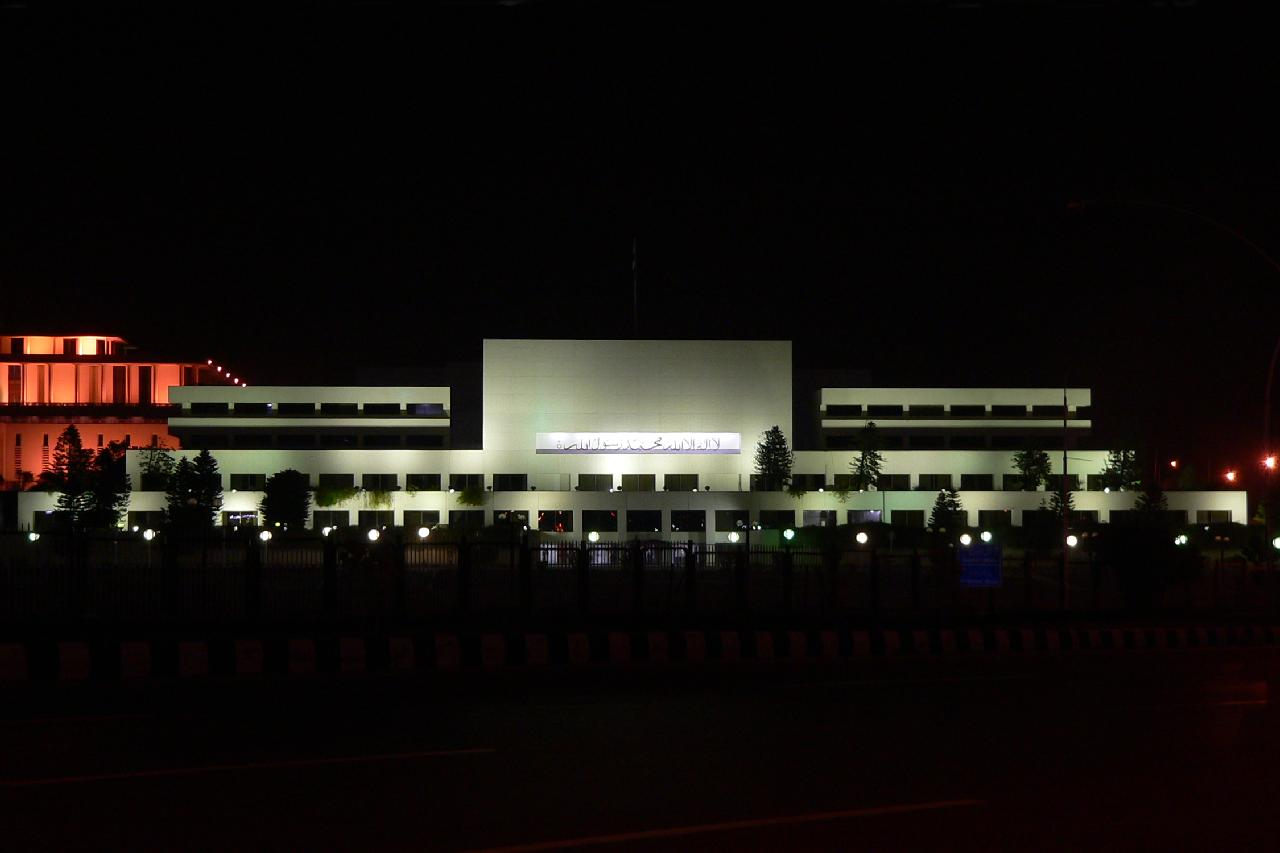
Parliament House Building, Red Zone, Islamabad

People who hold office in the Pakistani Parliament are referred to as members of parliament. These consist of:

- Member of Parliament, National Assembly of Pakistan: Representative of the Pakistani citizens to the National Assembly of Pakistan (Urdu: ایوانِ زیریں پاکستان), the lower house of the Parliament of Pakistan.
- Member of Parliament, Senate of Pakistan: Representative of the Pakistani provinces, region or states to the Senate of Pakistan (Urdu: ایوانِ بالا پاکستان), the upper house of the Parliament of Pakistan.

== Senate of Pakistan ==
- List of senators in the 14th Parliament of Pakistan
- List of senators in the 13th Parliament of Pakistan
- List of senators in the 12th Parliament of Pakistan
- List of senators in the 11th Parliament of Pakistan
- List of senators in the 10th Parliament of Pakistan
- List of senators in the 9th Parliament of Pakistan
- List of senators in the 8th Parliament of Pakistan
- List of senators in the 7th Parliament of Pakistan
- List of senators in the 6th Parliament of Pakistan
- List of senators in the 5th Parliament of Pakistan
- List of senators in the 4th Parliament of Pakistan
- List of senators in the 3rd Parliament of Pakistan
- List of senators in the 2nd Parliament of Pakistan
- List of senators in the 1st Parliament of Pakistan

== National Assembly of Pakistan ==
- List of members of the 15th National Assembly of Pakistan
- List of members of the 14th National Assembly of Pakistan
- List of members of the 13th National Assembly of Pakistan
- List of members of the 12th National Assembly of Pakistan
- List of members of the 11th National Assembly of Pakistan
- List of members of the 10th National Assembly of Pakistan
- List of members of the 9th National Assembly of Pakistan
- List of members of the 8th National Assembly of Pakistan
- List of members of the 7th National Assembly of Pakistan
- List of members of the 6th National Assembly of Pakistan
- List of members of the 5th National Assembly of Pakistan
- List of members of the 4th National Assembly of Pakistan
- List of members of the 3rd National Assembly of Pakistan
- List of members of the 2nd National Assembly of Pakistan
- List of members of the 1st National Assembly of Pakistan
