= List of members of the 9th National Assembly of Pakistan =

9th National Assembly
←	8th National Assembly	10th National Assembly	→
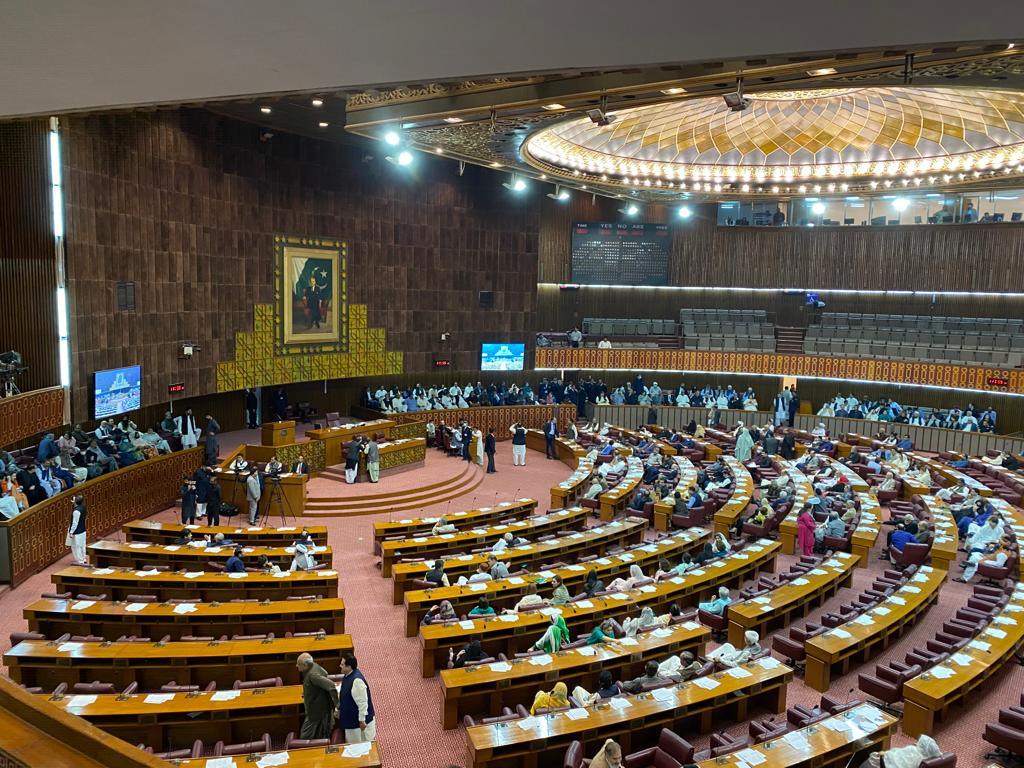

Overview
- Legislative body: National Assembly of Pakistan
- Jurisdiction: Pakistan
- Meeting place: Parliament House, Islamabad
- Term: 3 November 1990 – 18 July 1993
- Election: 1990 Pakistani general election
- Government: Government of Pakistan
- Website: Official website

National Assembly of Pakistan
- Members: 217
- Speaker: Gohar Ayub Khan
- Prime Minister: Nawaz Sharif
- Leader of the Opposition: Benazir Bhutto
- President: Ghulam Ishaq Khan

Direct-seat party position
Party / alliance		Party / alliance	
Party	Seats	Party	Seats
Islamic Democratic Alliance (IDA)	106	Muhajir Qaumi Movement	15
People's Democratic Alliance (PDA)	44	Independents	22
Other parties	20	Total = 207	

The 9th National Assembly of Pakistan was the legislature of Pakistan formed after the 1990 Pakistani general election. It was the lower house of the bicameral Majlis-e-Shura and had a total strength of 217 members: 207 general seats and 10 seats reserved for non-Muslim minorities.

The first session of the Assembly was held on 3 November 1990. Gohar Ayub Khan was elected Speaker of the National Assembly and took oath on 4 November 1990, while Muhammad Nawaz Khokhar served as Deputy Speaker. Nawaz Sharif took oath as prime minister on 6 November 1990, and Benazir Bhutto served as Leader of the Opposition.

The Assembly was dissolved by President Ghulam Ishaq Khan on 18 April 1993 under Article 58(2)(b), restored by the Supreme Court of Pakistan on 26 May 1993, and finally dissolved on 18 July 1993 on the advice of the prime minister.

== General seats ==
The following is a list of general seat members of the National Assembly.

Region	Constituency	Member	Political party	Ref.
North-West Frontier Province	NA-1 (Peshawar-I)	Ghulam Ahmad Bilour		
North-West Frontier Province	NA-2 (Peshawar-II)	Vacant		
North-West Frontier Province	NA-3 (Peshawar-cum-Nowshera)	Arbab Muhammad Zahir		
North-West Frontier Province	NA-4 (Nowshera)	Muhammad Ajmal Khan Khattak		
North-West Frontier Province	NA-5 (Charsadda)	Maulana Muhammad Hassan Jan		
North-West Frontier Province	NA-6 (Mardan-I)	Muhammad Azam Khan Hoti		
North-West Frontier Province	NA-7 (Mardan-II)	Haji Sarfaraz Khan Hatihan		
North-West Frontier Province	NA-8 (Swabi)	Rehmanullah Khan		
North-West Frontier Province	NA-9 (Kohat)	Syed Iftikhar Hussain Gillani		
North-West Frontier Province	NA-10 (Karak)	Muhammad Aslam Khan Khattak		
North-West Frontier Province	NA-11 (Abottabad-I)	Sardar Mahtab Ahmed Khan		
North-West Frontier Province	NA-12 (Abbottabad-II)	Javed Iqbal Abbasi		
North-West Frontier Province	NA-13 (Abbottabad-III)	Gohar Ayub Khan (Speaker, National Assembly)		
North-West Frontier Province	NA-14 (Mansehra-I)	Sardar Muhammad Yousuf		
North-West Frontier Province	NA-15 (Mansehra-II)	Nawabzada Salahuddin Saeed		
North-West Frontier Province	NA-16 (Mansehra-III)	Alamzeb Khan		
North-West Frontier Province	NA-17 (Kohistan)	Maulvi Muhammad Amin		
North-West Frontier Province	NA-18 (D.I. Khan)	Fazal Karim Kundi		
North-West Frontier Province	NA-19 (Bannu-I)	Maulvi Ali Akbar		
North-West Frontier Province	NA-20 (Bannu-II)	Naseer Muhammad Maidad Khel		
North-West Frontier Province	NA-21 (Swat-I)	Khaliq Dad Khan		
North-West Frontier Province	NA-22 (Swat-II)	Abdul Matin Khan		
North-West Frontier Province	NA-23 (Swat-III)	Muhammad Afzal Khan		
North-West Frontier Province	NA-24 (Chitral)	Shahzada Mohiuddin		
North-West Frontier Province	NA-25 (Dir)	Najmud Din		
North-West Frontier Province	NA-26 (Malakand Protected Area-cum-Dir)	Ahmed Hassan		
Federally Administered Tribal Areas	NA-27 (Tribal Area-I)	Haji Baroz Khan		
Federally Administered Tribal Areas	NA-28 (Tribal Area-II)	Syed Yousuf Hussain		
Federally Administered Tribal Areas	NA-29 (Tribal Area-III)	Malik Speen Gul		
Federally Administered Tribal Areas	NA-30 (Tribal Area-IV)	Muhammad Ajmal Khan		
Federally Administered Tribal Areas	NA-31 (Tribal Area-V)	Haji Sakhi Jan		
Federally Administered Tribal Areas	NA-32 (Tribal Area-VI)	Haji Lal Karim		
Federally Administered Tribal Areas	NA-33 (Tribal Area-VII)	Haji Muhammad Ayyub Afridi		
Federally Administered Tribal Areas	NA-34 (Tribal Area-VIII)	Malik Muhammad Aslam Khan Afridi		
Federal Capital	NA-35 (Federal Capital)	Muhammad Nawaz Khokhar (Deputy Speaker, National Assembly)		
Punjab	NA-36 (Rawalpindi-I)	Shahid Khaqan Abbasi		
Punjab	NA-37 (Rawalpindi-II)	Raja Muhammad Zaheer Khan		
Punjab	NA-38 (Rawalpindi-III)	Sheikh Rashid Ahmad		
Punjab	NA-39 (Rawalpindi-IV)	Muhammad Ijaz-ul-Haq		
Punjab	NA-40 (Rawalpindi-V)	Chaudhry Nisar Ali Khan		
Punjab	NA-41 (Attock-I)	Shaikh Aftab Ahmad		
Punjab	NA-42 (Attock-II)	Malik Allaha yar Khan		
Punjab	NA-43 (Chakwal-I)	Lt. Gen. (R) Malik Abdul Majeed		
Punjab	NA-44 (Chakwal-II)	Sardar Mansoor Hayat Tamman		
Punjab	NA-45 (Jhelum-I)	Vacant		
Punjab	NA-46 (Jhelum-II)	Nawabzada Iqbal Mehdi		
Punjab	NA-47 (Sargodha-I)	Ihsan-ul-Haq Piracha		
Punjab	NA-48 (Sargodha-II)	Chaudhry Qadir Bakhsh Mela		
Punjab	NA-49 (Sargodha-III)	Haji Muhammad Javed Iqbal Cheema		
Punjab	NA-50 (Sargodha-IV)	Chaudhry Anwar Ali Cheema		
Punjab	NA-51 (Sargodha-cum-Khushab)	Malik Muhammad Naeem Khan		
Punjab	NA-52 (Khushab)	Malik Ghulam Muhammad Khan Tiwana		
Punjab	NA-53 (Mianwali-I)	Maulana Muhammad Abdus Sattar Khan Niazi		
Punjab	NA-54 (Mianwali-II)	Gul Hameed Khan Rokhri		
Punjab	NA-55 (Bhakkar-I)	Aziz Ahmad Khan		
Punjab	NA-56 (Bhakkar-II)	Muhammad Zafarullah Khan Dhandla		
Punjab	NA-57 (Faisalabad-I)	Sardar Dildar Ahmed Cheema		
Punjab	NA-58 (Faisalabad-II)	Rai Muhammad Aslam Khan		
Punjab	NA-59 (Faisalabad-III)	Mian Nasir Ali Khan Baluch		
Punjab	NA-60 (Faisalabad-IV)	Muhammad Abdullah Ghazi		
Punjab	NA-61 (Faisalabad-V)	Chaudhry Muhammad Nazir Ahmed		
Punjab	NA-62 (Faisalabad-VI)	Raja Nadir Pervez		
Punjab	NA-63 (Faisalabad-VII)	Haji Muhammad Akram Ansari		
Punjab	NA-64 (Faisalabad-VIII)	Mian Zahid Sarfraz		
Punjab	NA-65 (Faisalabad-IX)	Chaudhry Sher Ali Khalid Abad		
Punjab	NA-66 (Jhang-I)	Amir Hussain Syed		
Punjab	NA-67 (Jhang-II)	Maulana Muhammad Rehmatullah		
Punjab	NA-68 (Jhang-III)	Maulana Muhammad Azam Tariq		
Punjab	NA-69 (Jhang-IV)	Makhdoom Syed Faisal Saleh Hayat		
Punjab	NA-70 (Jhang-V)	Sahibzada Muhammad Nazeer Sultan		
Punjab	NA-71 (T.T. Singh-I)	Chaudhry Asad-ur-Rehman		
Punjab	NA-72 (T.T. Singh-II)	Mian Abdul Waheed		
Punjab	NA-73 (T.T. Singh-III)	Hamza		
Punjab	NA-74 (Gujranwala-I)	Malik Hamid Nasir Chattha		
Punjab	NA-75 (Gujranwala-II)	Afzal Hussain Tarar		
Punjab	NA-76 (Gujranwala-III)	Ghulam Dastgir Khan		
Punjab	NA-77 (Gujranwala-IV)	Brig. (Retd.) Muhammad Asghar		
Punjab	NA-78 (Gujranwala-V)	Rana Nazir Ahmed Khan		
Punjab	NA-79 (Gujranwala-VI)	Muhammad Ashraf Warriach		
Punjab	NA-80 (Gujrat-I)	Tajjammal Hussain		
Punjab	NA-81 (Gujrat-II)	Chaudhry Shujat Hussain		
Punjab	NA-82 (Gujrat-III)	Syed Manzoor Hussain Shah		
Punjab	NA-83 (Gujrat-IV)	Nasir Iqbal Chalianwala		
Punjab	NA-84 (Gujrat-V)	Muhammad Nawaz Bosal		
Punjab	NA-85 (Sialkot-I)	Mian Muhammad Shafi		
Punjab	NA-86 (Sialkot-II)	Chaudhry Amir Hussain		
Punjab	NA-87 (Sialkot-III)	Chaudhry Nazeer Ahmed Khan		
Punjab	NA-88 (Sialkot-IV)	Chaudhry Abdul Sattar		
Punjab	NA-89 (Sialkot-V)	Chaudhry Muhammad Sarwar Khan		
Punjab	NA-90 (Sialkot-VI)	Syed Ghous Ali Shah		
Punjab	NA-91 (Sialkot-VII)	Muhammad Ishfaq Taj		
Punjab	NA-92 (Lahore-I)	Humayun Akhtar Khan		
Punjab	NA-93 (Lahore-II)	Aitzaz Ahsan		
Punjab	NA-94 (Lahore-III)	Mian Umar Hayat		
Punjab	NA-95 (Lahore-IV)	Muhammad Nawaz Sharif (Prime Minister of Pakistan)		
Punjab	NA-96 (Lahore-V)	Mian Muhammad Shahbaz Sharif		
Punjab	NA-97 (Lahore-VI)	Liaqat Baluch		
Punjab	NA-98 (Lahore-VII)	Mian Muhammad Usman		
Punjab	NA-99 (Lahore-VIII)	Wazir Ali Bhatti		
Punjab	NA-100 (Lahore-IX)	Muhammad Ashiq Dayal		
Punjab	NA-101 (Sheikhupura-I)	Rana Tanveer Hussain		
Punjab	NA-102 (Sheikhupura-II)	Nazir Aahmed Virk		
Punjab	NA-103 (Sheikhupura-III)	Muhammad Barjees Tahir		
Punjab	NA-104 (Sheikhupura-IV)	Naeem Hussain Chattha		
Punjab	NA-105 (Sheikhupura-V)	Rai Mansab Ali Khan		
Punjab	NA-106 (Kasur-I)	Sardar Asseff Ahmed Ali		
Punjab	NA-107 (Kasur-II)	Rao Muhammad Khizar Hayat		
Punjab	NA-108 (Kasur-III)	Rana Muhammad Hayat Khan		
Punjab	NA-109 (Kasur-IV)	Maulana Moeenuddin Lakhvi		
Punjab	NA-110 (Okara-I)	Sahibzada Farooq Anwar		
Punjab	NA-111 (Okara-II)	Sahibzada Sajjad Haider		
Punjab	NA-112 (Okara-III)	Rao Muhammad Afzal Khan		
Punjab	NA-113 (Okara-IV)	Rao Muhammad Yaqoob Khan		
Punjab	NA-114 (Multan-I)	Yousuf Raza Gillani		
Punjab	NA-115 (Multan-II)	Riaz Hussain Qureshi		
Punjab	NA-116 (Multan-III)	Muhammad Iqbal Shah		
Punjab	NA-117 (Multan-IV)	Muhammad Siddique Khan Kanju		
Punjab	NA-118 (Multan-V)	Shah Mehmood Qureshi		
Punjab	NA-119 (Multan-VI)	Rana Taj Ahmad Noon		
Punjab	NA-120 (Multan-cum-Khanewal)	Zahoor Hussain Qureshi		
Punjab	NA-121 (Khanewal-I)	Mehr Muhammad Iqbal Hiraj		
Punjab	NA-122 (Khanewal-II)	Aftab Ahmad Khan Daha		
Punjab	NA-123 (Khanewal-III)	Ghulam Haider Wyne		
Punjab	NA-124 (Sahiwal-I)	Chaudhry Nouraiz Shakoor Khan		
Punjab	NA-125 (Sahiwal-II)	Chaudhry Muhammad Ashraf		
Punjab	NA-126 (Sahiwal-III)	Rai Ahmed Nawaz		
Punjab	NA-127 (Sahiwal-IV)	Mian Ghulam Muhammad Ahmad Khan Manika		
Punjab	NA-128 (Sahiwal-V)	Raja Shahid Saeed Khan		
Punjab	NA-129 (Vehari-I)	Mian Mumtaz Ahmad Khan Bhaba		
Punjab	NA-130 (Vehari-II)	Akbar Ali Bhatti		
Punjab	NA-131 (Vehari-III)	Syed Shahid Mehdi Naseem		
Punjab	NA-132 (D.G. Khan)	Sardar Muhammad Amjed Farooq Khosa		
Punjab	NA-133 (D.G. Khan-cum-Rajanpur)	Sardar Farooq Ahmad Khan Leghari		
Punjab	NA-134 (Rajanpur)	Mir Balakh Sher Mazari		
Punjab	NA-135 (Muzaffargarh-I)	Sardar Abdul Qayyum Khan Jatoi		
Punjab	NA-136 (Muzaffargarh-II)	Mian Atta Muhammad Qureshi		
Punjab	NA-137 (Muzaffargarh-III)	Malik Ghulam Muhammad Noor Rabani Khar		
Punjab	NA-138 (Muzaffargarh-IV)	Malik Ghulam Mustafa Khar		
Punjab	NA-139 (Layyah-I)	Syed Muhammad Khurshid Ahmed Bukhari		
Punjab	NA-140 (Layyah-II)	Sahibzada Faiz-ul-Hassan		
Punjab	NA-141 (Bahawalpur-I)	Nawab Salahuddin Abbasi		
Punjab	NA-142 (Bahawalpur-II)	Sahibzada Farooq Anwar Abbasi		
Punjab	NA-143 (Bahawalpur-III)	Syed Tasneem Nawaz Gardezi		
Punjab	NA-144 (Bahawalnagar-I)	Syed Muhammad Asghar Shah		
Punjab	NA-145 (Bahawalnagar-II)	Mian Abdul Sattar Lalika		
Punjab	NA-146 (Bahawalnagar-III)	Chaudhry Abdul Ghafoor		
Punjab	NA-147 (Rahimyar Khan-I)	Makhdum Syed Ahmed Alam Anwar		
Punjab	NA-148 (Rahimyar Khan-II)	Makhdoom Shahab-ud-Din		
Punjab	NA-149 (Rahimyar Khan-III)	Mian Abdul Khaliq		
Punjab	NA-150 (Rahimyar Khan-IV)	Makhdum Syed Ahmed Mahmud		
Sindh	NA-151 (Sukkur-I)	Khurshed Ahmed Shah		
Sindh	NA-152 (Sukkur-II)	Jam Saifullah Khan Dharejo		
Sindh	NA-153 (Sukkur-III)	Al-Han Noor Muhammad Khan Lund		
Sindh	NA-154 (Shikarpur-I)	Aftab Shahban Mirani		
Sindh	NA-155 (Shikarpur-II)	Mir Altaf Khan Bhayo		
Sindh	NA-156 (Jacobabad-I)	Illahi Bukhsh Soomro		
Sindh	NA-157 (Jacobabad-II)	Mir Hazar Khan Bijarani		
Sindh	NA-158 (Naushehro Feroze-I)	Ghulam Mustafa Khan Jatoi		
Sindh	NA-159 (Naushehro-II)	Syed Zafar Ali Shah		
Sindh	NA-160 (Nawabshah-I)	Ghulama Murtaza Khan Jatoi		
Sindh	NA-161 (Nawabshah-II)	Syed Shabir Ahmed Shah		
Sindh	NA-162 (Khairpur-I)	Syed Pervez Ali Shah Jillani		
Sindh	NA-163 (Khairpur-II)	Pir Syed Abdul Qadir Shah Jillani		
Sindh	NA-164 (Larkana-I)	Begum Nusrat Bhutto		
Sindh	NA-165 (Larkana-II)	Shabir Ahmed Khan Chandio		
Sindh	NA-166 (Larkana-III)	Benazir Bhutto (Leader of the Opposition)		
Sindh	NA-167 (Hyderabad-I)	Makhdoom Muhammad Amin Faheem		
Sindh	NA-168 (Hyderabad-II)	Vacant		
Sindh	NA-169 (Hyderabad-III)	Vacant		
Sindh	NA-170 (Hyderabad-IV)	Syed Naveed Qamar		
Sindh	NA-171 (Hyderabad-V)	Abdul Sattar Bachani		
Sindh	NA-172 (Badin-I)	Haji Abdullah Halepoto		
Sindh	NA-173 (Badin-II)	Bashir Ahmed Halepoto		
Sindh	NA-174 (Tharparkar-I)	Arbab Amir Hassan		
Sindh	NA-175 (Tharparkar-II)	Sayed Noor Muhammad Shah Jillani		
Sindh	NA-176 (Tharparkar-III)	Nawab Yousuf Talpur		
Sindh	NA-177 (Jamshoro)	Malik Asad Sikandar		
Sindh	NA-178 (Dadu-I)	Rafiq Ahmed Jamali		
Sindh	NA-179 (Dadu-II)	Haji Zaffar Ali Laghari		
Sindh	NA-180 (Sanghar-I)	Syed Ali Gohar Shah		
Sindh	NA-181 (Sanghar-II)	Shah Nawaz Junejo		
Sindh	NA-182 (Thatta-I)	Moulana Muhammad Ali Jamot		
Sindh	NA-183 (Thatta-II)	Syed Ghulam Mustafa Shah		
Sindh	NA-184 (Karachi West-I)	Vacant		
Sindh	NA-185 (Karachi West-II)	Vacant		
Sindh	NA-186 (Karachi Central-I)	Vacant		
Sindh	NA-187 (Karachi Central-II)	Vacant		
Sindh	NA-188 (Karachi Central-III)	Vacant		
Sindh	NA-189 (Karachi South-I)	Asif Ali Zardari		
Sindh	NA-190 (Karachi South-II)	Vacant		
Sindh	NA-191 (Karachi South-III)	Vacant		
Sindh	NA-192 (Karachi East-I)	Vacant		
Sindh	NA-193 (Karachi East-II)	Islam Nabi		
Sindh	NA-194 (Karachi East-III)	Vacant		
Sindh	NA-195 (Karachi East-IV)	Rehan Umer Farooqui		
Sindh	NA-196 (Karachi East-V)	Wasim Ahmed		
Balochistan	NA-197 (Quetta-cum-Chagai)	Sardar Fateh Muhammad M. Hassani		
Balochistan	NA-198 (Pishin)	Mehmood Khan Achakzai		
Balochistan	NA-199 (Loralai)	Sardar Yaqub Khan Nasar		
Balochistan	NA-200 (Zhob-cum-Killa Saifullah)	Maulvi Muhammad Khan Sherani		
Balochistan	NA-201 (Kachhi)	Mir Yar Muhammad Rind		
Balochistan	NA-202 (Sibbi-cum-Kohlu-cum-Dera Bugti-cum-Ziarat)	Saleem Akbar Bughti		
Balochistan	NA-203 (Jaffarabad-cum-Tamboo)	Mir Nabi Bakhsh Khan Khoso		
Balochistan	NA-204 (Kalat-cum-Kharan)	Maulvi Muhammad Siddique Shah		
Balochistan	NA-205 (Khuzdar)	Mir Hasil Bizenjo		
Balochistan	NA-206 (Lasbela-cum-Gwadar)	Shahzada Jam Muhammad Yousuf		
Balochistan	NA-207 (Turbat-cum-Panjgur)	Mir Bizan Bizenjo		

== Women members ==
Only two women were elected on general seats in the 9th National Assembly: Begum Nusrat Bhutto from NA-164 (Larkana-I) and Benazir Bhutto from NA-166 (Larkana-III). No woman was elected on a reserved seat because the constitutional provision for women's reserved seats had lapsed after three election cycles.

Member	Political party	Constituency / constituencies won	Ref.
Begum Nusrat Bhutto	PPP	NA-164 (Larkana-I)	
Benazir Bhutto	PPP	NA-166 (Larkana-III)	

== Non-Muslim members ==
Member	Community	Ref.
Peter John Sahotra	Christian	
Tariq C. Qaiser	Christian	
Rufin Julius	Christian	
Khatumal Jeewan	Hindu / Scheduled Castes	
Rana Chandar Singh	Hindu / Scheduled Castes	
Kishin Chand Parwani	Hindu / Scheduled Castes	
Bhagwandas K. Chawala	Hindu / Scheduled Castes	
Byram D. Awari	Parsi / Sikh / Buddhists and others	
Bashiruddin Khalid	Ahmadi	
