= Abdul Ghani (JUI-F politician) =

Pakistani politician

Al-Haj Maulana Abdul Ghani
- الحاج مولانا عبدالغنی

Member of the National Assembly of Pakistan
- In office 1997–1999

Personal details
- Died: 26 October 2011 Chaman, Balochistan, Pakistan
- Cause of death: Road accident
- Party: Jamiat Ulema-e-Islam (F)
- Profession: Religious and political leader

Abdul Ghani was a Pakistani Islamic scholar and political leader who served as a Member of the National Assembly (MNA) from 1997 to 1999 and was affiliated with the Jamiat Ulema-e-Islam (F) (JUI-F).

He died in a road accident in Chaman, Balochistan, on 26 October 2011.

== Death and legacy ==
On 26 October 2011, Ghani died in a road accident near Chaman Town in the Qila Abdullah district of Balochistan. According to reports, he was traveling to his madrasah in a car when another fast-moving vehicle collided head-on with his vehicle.

The Taliban praised him posthumously, describing him as a "martyr for the cause of jihad."
