= Joyce Rofin Julius =

Pakistani politician

Member of the Provincial Assembly of the Punjab
- In office 2002 – 31 May 2018
- Constituency: Reserved seat for women

Personal details
- Born: 1 September 1949 (age 77)
- Other political affiliations: Pakistan Muslim League (N)
- Spouse: Rufin Julius

Joyce Rofin Julius (Urdu: جوئیس روفن جولیس; born 1 September 1949) is a Pakistani politician who was a Member of the Provincial Assembly of the Punjab from 2002 to May 2018.

== Political career ==
She was elected as a candidate of the Pakistan Muslim League (Q) (PML-Q) on a reserved seat for minorities in the 2002 Pakistani general election. She served as Provincial Minister for Minorities’ Affairs from 2003 to 2007.

She was re-elected to the Provincial Assembly of the Punjab as a candidate of the PML-Q on a reserved seat for minorities in the 2008 Pakistani general election.

She was re-elected to the Provincial Assembly of the Punjab as a candidate of the Pakistan Muslim League (N) on a reserved seat for women in the 2013 Pakistani general election.

In December 2013, she was appointed Parliamentary Secretary for school education.
