= List of members of the 8th National Assembly of Pakistan =

8th National Assembly
←	7th National Assembly	9th National Assembly	→
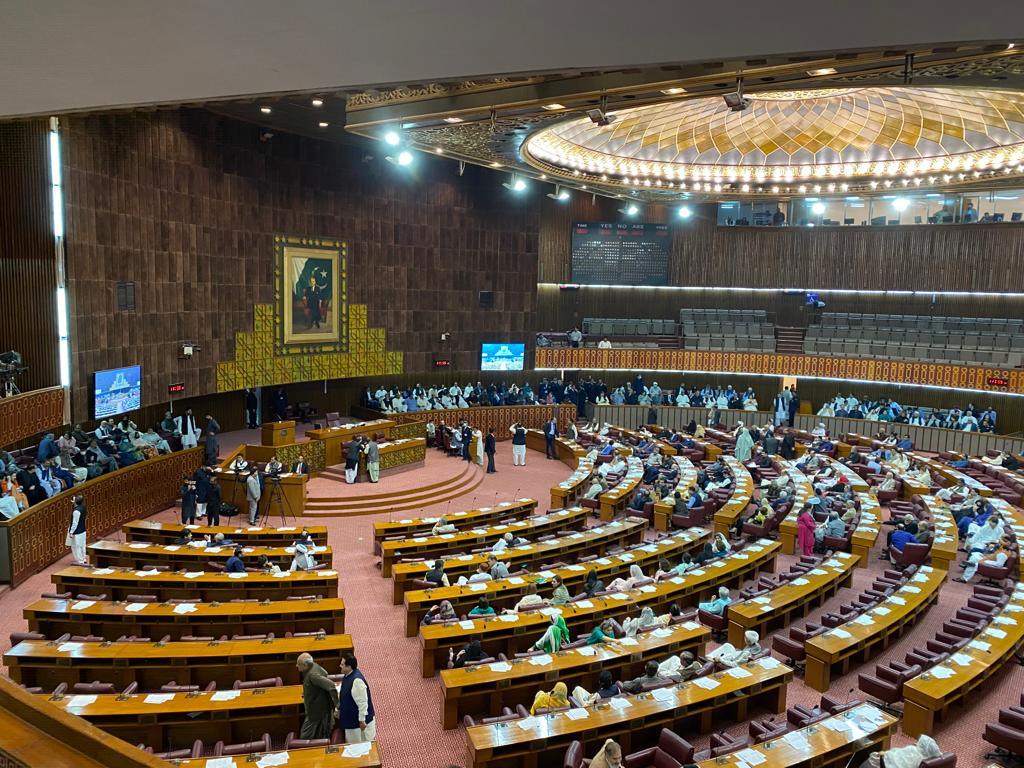

Overview
- Legislative body: National Assembly of Pakistan
- Jurisdiction: Pakistan
- Meeting place: Parliament House, Islamabad
- Term: 30 November 1988 – 6 August 1990
- Election: 1988 Pakistani general election
- Government: First Benazir Bhutto government
- Website: Official website

National Assembly of Pakistan
- Members: 237
- Speaker: Meraj Khalid
- Prime Minister: Benazir Bhutto
- Leader of the Opposition: Abdul Wali Khan
- President: Ghulam Ishaq Khan

Direct-seat party position
Party		Party	
Party	Seats	Party	Seats
PPP	94	JUI(F)	7
IJI	55	PAI	3
Independents	40	ANP	2
BNA	2	NPP (Khar Group)	1
PDP	1	JUP (D)	1
Total = 206

The 8th National Assembly of Pakistan was the legislature of Pakistan following the 1988 Pakistani general election, which restored party-based parliamentary politics at the federal level after the 1985 non-party election. The Assembly was the lower house of the bicameral Majlis-e-Shura, and had a total strength of 237 members: 207 general seats, 20 reserved seats for women elected by the Assembly itself, and 10 seats for non-Muslim minorities.

The first session of the Assembly was convened on 30 November 1988. Benazir Bhutto took oath as prime minister on 2 December 1988, becoming the first woman to head the government of Pakistan and of a Muslim-majority state. Meraj Khalid was elected Speaker of the National Assembly on 3 December 1988, while Ashraf Khatoon Abbasi was elected Deputy Speaker. Abdul Wali Khan served as Leader of the Opposition during the life of the Assembly.

The Pakistan Peoples Party (PPP) emerged as the largest bloc in the direct election, while MQM-backed candidates running as independents swept much of urban Sindh and became pivotal to government formation. The Assembly was dissolved by President Ghulam Ishaq Khan under Article 58(2)(b) on 6 August 1990, bringing the first Bhutto government to an end.

== General seats ==
The following table of general seat members is sourced from the National Assembly:

Region	Constituency	Member	Political party	Ref.
North-West Frontier Province	NA-1 (Peshawar-I)	Ghulam Ahmad Bilour	Pakistan Peoples Party	
North-West Frontier Province	NA-2 (Peshawar-II)	Khan Bahadur Khan	Pakistan Peoples Party	
North-West Frontier Province	NA-3 (Peshawar-III)	Sardar Ali Khan	Pakistan Peoples Party	
North-West Frontier Province	NA-4 (Peshawar-IV)	Mian Muzaffar Shah	Pakistan Peoples Party	
North-West Frontier Province	NA-5 (Charsadda)	Khan Abdul Wali Khan	Awami National Party	
North-West Frontier Province	NA-6 (Mardan-I)	Haji Muhammad Yaqoob	Pakistan Peoples Party	
North-West Frontier Province	NA-7 (Mardan-II)	Maulana Muhammad Ahmed	JUI-F	
North-West Frontier Province	NA-8 (Swabi)	Abdul Khaliq Khan	Awami National Party	
North-West Frontier Province	NA-9 (Kohat)	Maulvi Niamatullah	Islami Jamhoori Ittehad	
North-West Frontier Province	NA-10 (Karak)	Maulana Shaheed Ahmed	JUI-D	
North-West Frontier Province	NA-11 (Abbottabad-I)	Farid M. Jadoon	Independent	
North-West Frontier Province	NA-12 (Abbottabad-II)	Sardar Haji Gul Khitab Khan	Islami Jamhoori Ittehad	
North-West Frontier Province	NA-13 (Abbottabad-III)	Raja Sikander Zaman Khan	Islami Jamhoori Ittehad	
North-West Frontier Province	NA-14 (Mansehra-I)	Syed Qasim Shah	Independent	
North-West Frontier Province	NA-15 (Mansehra-II)	Nawabzada Salahuddin Saeed	Independent	
North-West Frontier Province	NA-16 (Mansehra-III)	Muhammad Ayub Khan	Islami Jamhoori Ittehad	
North-West Frontier Province	NA-17 (Kohistan)	Fazle Haq	Islami Jamhoori Ittehad	
North-West Frontier Province	NA-18 (D.I. Khan)	Maulana Fazlur Rehman	JUI-F	
North-West Frontier Province	NA-19 (Bannu-I)	Maulvi Ali Akbar Khan	JUI-F	
North-West Frontier Province	NA-20 (Bannu-II)	Anwar Saifullah Khan	Islami Jamhoori Ittehad	
North-West Frontier Province	NA-21 (Swat-I)	Shahzada Aman-I-Room	Pakistan Peoples Party	
North-West Frontier Province	NA-22 (Swat-II)	Haji Fazl-e-Raziq	Islami Jamhoori Ittehad	
North-West Frontier Province	NA-23 (Swat-III)	Dr. Mehboob-ur-Rehman	Pakistan Peoples Party	
North-West Frontier Province	NA-24 (Chitral)	Syed Abdul Ghafoor Shah	Pakistan Peoples Party	
North-West Frontier Province	NA-25 (Dir)	Sahibzada Fatehullah	Islami Jamhoori Ittehad	
North-West Frontier Province	NA-26 (Malakand Protected Area-cum-Dir)	Muhammad Hanif Khan	Pakistan Peoples Party	
Federally Administered Tribal Areas	NA-27 (Tribal Area-I)	Haji Qadar Gul Khan	Independent	
Federally Administered Tribal Areas	NA-28 (Tribal Area-II)	Akhunzada Muhammad Saeed	Independent	
Federally Administered Tribal Areas	NA-29 (Tribal Area-III)	Ghazi Said Jamal	Independent	
Federally Administered Tribal Areas	NA-30 (Tribal Area-IV)	Malik Nadar Khan	Independent	
Federally Administered Tribal Areas	NA-31 (Tribal Area-V)	Malik Sakhi Jan	Independent	
Federally Administered Tribal Areas	NA-32 (Tribal Area-VI)	Bismillah Khan	Independent	
Federally Administered Tribal Areas	NA-33 (Tribal Area-VII)	Malik Waris Khan	Independent	
Federally Administered Tribal Areas	NA-34 (Tribal Area-VIII)	Momin Khan Afridi	Independent	
Federal Capital	NA-35 (Federal Capital)	Raja Pervez Khan	Pakistan Peoples Party	
Punjab	NA-36 (Rawalpindi-I)	Shahid Khaqan Abbasi	Independent	
Punjab	NA-37 (Rawalpindi-II)	Raja Muhammad Zaheer Khan	Islami Jamhoori Ittehad	
Punjab	NA-38 (Rawalpindi-III)	Sheikh Rashid Ahmad	Islami Jamhoori Ittehad	
Punjab	NA-39 (Rawalpindi-IV)	Raja Shahid Zafar	Pakistan Peoples Party	
Punjab	NA-40 (Rawalpindi-V)	Chaudhry Nisar Ali Khan	Islami Jamhoori Ittehad	
Punjab	NA-41 (Attock-I)	Malik Mohammad Aslam	Pakistan Peoples Party	
Punjab	NA-42 (Attock-II)	Malik Amir Muhammad Khan	Pakistan Peoples Party	
Punjab	NA-43 (Chakwal-I)	Abdul Majeed Malik	Islami Jamhoori Ittehad	
Punjab	NA-44 (Chakwal-II)	Sardar Mansoor Hayat Tamman	Islami Jamhoori Ittehad	
Punjab	NA-45 (Jhelum-I)	Raja Muhammad Afzal Khan	Islami Jamhoori Ittehad	
Punjab	NA-46 (Jhelum-II)	Nawabzada Iqbal Mehdi	Independent	
Punjab	NA-47 (Sargodha-I)	Ihsan-ul-Haq Piracha	Pakistan Peoples Party	
Punjab	NA-48 (Sargodha-II)	Lt. Col. (R) Chaudhry Qadir Bakhsh Mela	Pakistan Peoples Party	
Punjab	NA-49 (Sargodha-III)	Haji Muhammad Javed Iqbal Cheema	Islami Jamhoori Ittehad	
Punjab	NA-50 (Sargodha-IV)	Chaudhry Anwar Ali Cheema	Islami Jamhoori Ittehad	
Punjab	NA-51 (Sargodha-cum-Khushab)	Malik Muhammad Naeem Khan	Islami Jamhoori Ittehad	
Punjab	NA-52 (Khushab)	Malik Khuda Bakhsh Khan Tiwana	Independent	
Punjab	NA-53 (Mianwali-I)	Maulana Muhammad Abdus Sattar Khan Niazi	Pakistan Awami Ittehad	
Punjab	NA-54 (Mianwali-II)	Sher Afgan Khan Niazi	Pakistan Awami Ittehad	
Punjab	NA-55 (Bhakkar-I)	Muhammad Zafar Ullah Khan	Independent	
Punjab	NA-56 (Bhakkar-II)	Rashid Akbar Khan	Independent	
Punjab	NA-57 (Faisalabad-I)	Mian Zahid Sarfraz	—	
Punjab	NA-58 (Faisalabad-II)	Rai Muhammad Aslam Khan	Pakistan Peoples Party	
Punjab	NA-59 (Faisalabad-III)	Khan Shahadat Ali Khan Baloch	Pakistan Peoples Party	
Punjab	NA-60 (Faisalabad-IV)	Chaudhry Abdul Saboor Khan	Pakistan Peoples Party	
Punjab	NA-61 (Faisalabad-V)	Chaudhry Muhammad Nazir Ahmad	Islami Jamhoori Ittehad	
Punjab	NA-62 (Faisalabad-VI)	Chaudhry Ghulam Mustafa Bajwa	Islami Jamhoori Ittehad	
Punjab	NA-63 (Faisalabad-VII)	Nisar Akbar Khan	Pakistan Peoples Party	
Punjab	NA-64 (Faisalabad-VIII)	Ahmed Saeed Awan	Pakistan Peoples Party	
Punjab	NA-65 (Faisalabad-IX)	Maher Abdul Rasheed	Pakistan Peoples Party	
Punjab	NA-66 (Jhang-I)	Amir Hussain Syed	Pakistan Peoples Party	
Punjab	NA-67 (Jhang-II)	Maulana Muhammad Rehmatullah		
Punjab	NA-68 (Jhang-III)	Syeda Abida Hussain	Independent	
Punjab	NA-69 (Jhang-IV)	Syed Faisal Saleh Hayat	Pakistan Peoples Party	
Punjab	NA-70 (Jhang-V)	Sahibzada Muhammad Nazeer Sultan	Pakistan Peoples Party	
Punjab	NA-71 (T.T. Singh-I)	Chaudhry Asad-ur-Rehman	Islami Jamhoori Ittehad	
Punjab	NA-72 (T.T. Singh-II)	Chaudhry Abdul Sattar	Islami Jamhoori Ittehad	
Punjab	NA-73 (T.T. Singh-III)	Haji Muhammad Ishaq	Pakistan Peoples Party	
Punjab	NA-74 (Gujranwala-I)	Col. (R) Ghulam Sarwar Cheema	Pakistan Peoples Party	
Punjab	NA-75 (Gujranwala-II)	Malik Fazal Hussain Awan	Pakistan Peoples Party	
Punjab	NA-76 (Gujranwala-III)	Haji Amanullah	Pakistan Peoples Party	
Punjab	NA-77 (Gujranwala-IV)	Khawaja Muhammad Aslam Lone	Pakistan Peoples Party	
Punjab	NA-78 (Gujranwala-V)	Rana Nazir Ahmed Khan	Islami Jamhoori Ittehad	
Punjab	NA-79 (Gujranwala-VI)	Chaudhry Ejaz Ahmad	Islami Jamhoori Ittehad	
Punjab	NA-80 (Gujrat-I)	Chaudhry Taj Jamal Hussain	Islami Jamhoori Ittehad	
Punjab	NA-81 (Gujrat-II)	Chaudhry Shujaat Hussain	Islami Jamhoori Ittehad	
Punjab	NA-82 (Gujrat-III)	Chaudhry Muhammad Asghar Kaira	Pakistan Peoples Party	
Punjab	NA-83 (Gujrat-IV)	Mumtaz Ahmed Tarar	Pakistan Peoples Party	
Punjab	NA-84 (Gujrat-V)	Umar Hayat Lalika	Islami Jamhoori Ittehad	
Punjab	NA-85 (Sialkot-I)	Mian Muhammad Shafi	Islami Jamhoori Ittehad	
Punjab	NA-86 (Sialkot-II)	Chaudhry Amir Hussain	Islami Jamhoori Ittehad	
Punjab	NA-87 (Sialkot-III)	Khurshid Alam Cheema	Pakistan Peoples Party	
Punjab	NA-88 (Sialkot-IV)	Chaudhry Abdul Sattar		
Punjab	NA-89 (Sialkot-V)	Hamid Nawaz Khan	Pakistan Peoples Party	
Punjab	NA-90 (Sialkot-VI)	Anwar-ul-Haq Chaudhry	Islami Jamhoori Ittehad	
Punjab	NA-91 (Sialkot-VII)	Anwar Aziz Chaudhry	Islami Jamhoori Ittehad	
Punjab	NA-92 (Lahore-I)	Maj-Gen. (Retd.) Muhammad Hussain Ansari	Pakistan Awami Ittehad	
Punjab	NA-93 (Lahore-II)	Aitzaz Ahsan	Pakistan Peoples Party	
Punjab	NA-94 (Lahore-III)	Mian Umar Hayat		
Punjab	NA-95 (Lahore-IV)	Mian Muhammad Azhar		
Punjab	NA-96 (Lahore-V)	Jehangir Badar	Pakistan Peoples Party	
Punjab	NA-97 (Lahore-VI)	Khawaja Ahmad Tariq Rahim	Pakistan Peoples Party	
Punjab	NA-98 (Lahore-VII)	Mian Muhammad Usman	Islami Jamhoori Ittehad	
Punjab	NA-99 (Lahore-VIII)	Muhammad Arshad Ghurki		
Punjab	NA-100 (Lahore-IX)	Malik Meraj Khalid	Pakistan Peoples Party	
Punjab	NA-101 (Sheikhupura-I)	Nisar Ahmed Pannoun	Pakistan Peoples Party	
Punjab	NA-102 (Sheikhupura-II)	Malik Mushtaq Ahmed	Pakistan Peoples Party	
Punjab	NA-103 (Sheikhupura-III)	Muhammad Arif Awan	Pakistan Peoples Party	
Punjab	NA-104 (Sheikhupura-IV)	Chaudhry Tawakkal-ullah Virk	Pakistan Peoples Party	
Punjab	NA-105 (Sheikhupura-V)	Rai Rashid Ahmed Khan	Pakistan Peoples Party	
Punjab	NA-106 (Kasur-I)	Sahibzada Khizar Hayat Khan	Independent	
Punjab	NA-107 (Kasur-II)	Rao Muhammad Khizar Hayat	Islami Jamhoori Ittehad	
Punjab	NA-108 (Kasur-III)	Sardar Talib Hassan		
Punjab	NA-109 (Kasur-IV)	Sardar Muhammad Ashiq Dogar	Pakistan Peoples Party	
Punjab	NA-110 (Okara-I)	Rao Sikandar Iqbal	Pakistan Peoples Party	
Punjab	NA-111 (Okara-II)	Syed Sajjad Haider	Islami Jamhoori Ittehad	
Punjab	NA-112 (Okara-III)	Rao Muhammad Afzal Khan	Pakistan Peoples Party	
Punjab	NA-113 (Okara-IV)	Mian Ata Muhammad Khan Maneka		
Punjab	NA-114 (Multan-I)	Syed Yousuf Raza Gillani	Pakistan Peoples Party	
Punjab	NA-115 (Multan-II)	Riaz Hussain Qureshi	Pakistan Peoples Party	
Punjab	NA-116 (Multan-III)	Malik Mukhtar Ahmed Awan	Pakistan Peoples Party	
Punjab	NA-117 (Multan-IV)	Muhammad Siddique Khan Kanju	Islami Jamhoori Ittehad	
Punjab	NA-118 (Multan-V)	Mirza Muhammad Nasir Baig	Pakistan Peoples Party	
Punjab	NA-119 (Multan-VI)	Rana Taj Ahmad Noon	Pakistan Peoples Party	
Punjab	NA-120 (Multan-cum-Khanewal)	Fazal Dad Wahla		
Punjab	NA-121 (Khanewal-I)	Mehr Muhammad Iqbal Hiraj	Pakistan Peoples Party	
Punjab	NA-122 (Khanewal-II)	Aftab Ahmad Khan Daha	Islami Jamhoori Ittehad	
Punjab	NA-123 (Khanewal-III)	Ghulam Haider Wyne	Islami Jamhoori Ittehad	
Punjab	NA-124 (Sahiwal-I)	Chaudhry Nouraiz Shakoor Khan	Pakistan Peoples Party	
Punjab	NA-125 (Sahiwal-II)	Chaudhry Muhammad Ashraf	Islami Jamhoori Ittehad	
Punjab	NA-126 (Sahiwal-III)	Rai Ahmed Nawaz	Islami Jamhoori Ittehad	
Punjab	NA-127 (Sahiwal-IV)	Mian Ghulam Muhammad Ahmad Khan Maneka	Islami Jamhoori Ittehad	
Punjab	NA-128 (Sahiwal-V)	Raja Shahid Saeed Khan		
Punjab	NA-129 (Vehari-I)	Muhammad Mumtaz Khan Bhaba	Pakistan Peoples Party	
Punjab	NA-130 (Vehari-II)	Akbar Ali Bhatti	Islami Jamhoori Ittehad	
Punjab	NA-131 (Vehari-III)	Shahid Mehdi Nasim	Islami Jamhoori Ittehad	
Punjab	NA-132 (D.G. Khan)	Khawaja Kamal-ud-Din Anwar	Islami Jamhoori Ittehad	
Punjab	NA-133 (D.G. Khan-cum-Rajanpur)	Sardar Farooq Ahmad Khan Leghari	Pakistan Peoples Party	
Punjab	NA-134 (Rajanpur-I)	Sardar Ashiq Muhammad Khan Mazari	Pakistan Peoples Party	
Punjab	NA-135 (Muzaffargarh-I)	Dr. Zulfiqar Ali Barq	Independent	
Punjab	NA-136 (Muzaffargarh-II)	Nawabzada Nasrullah Khan	Pakistan Democratic Party	
Punjab	NA-137 (Muzaffargarh-III)	Malik Ghulam Mustafa Khan	NPP-K	
Punjab	NA-138 (Muzaffargarh-IV)	Ghulam Mustafa Khan Jatoi		
Punjab	NA-139 (Layyah-I)	Malik Niaz Ahmad Jakhar	Pakistan Peoples Party	
Punjab	NA-140 (Layyah-II)	Sahibzada Faiz-ul-Hassan	Islami Jamhoori Ittehad	
Punjab	NA-141 (Bahawalpur-I)	Nawab Salahuddin Abbasi	Independent	
Punjab	NA-142 (Bahawalpur-II)	Muhammad Farooq Azam Malik	Pakistan Peoples Party	
Punjab	NA-143 (Bahawalpur-III)	Syed Tasneem Nawaz Gardezi	Islami Jamhoori Ittehad	
Punjab	NA-144 (Bahawalnagar-I)	Syed Mumtaz Alam Gillani	Pakistan Peoples Party	
Punjab	NA-145 (Bahawalnagar-II)	Mian Abdul Sattar Lalika	Islami Jamhoori Ittehad	
Punjab	NA-146 (Bahawalnagar-III)	Chaudhry Abdul Ghafoor	Islami Jamhoori Ittehad	
Punjab	NA-147 (Rahimyar Khan-I)	Makhdum Syed Ahmed Alam Anwar	Islami Jamhoori Ittehad	
Punjab	NA-148 (Rahimyar Khan-II)	Makhdum Ruknudin	Pakistan Peoples Party	
Punjab	NA-149 (Rahimyar Khan-III)	Mian Abdul Khaliq	Islami Jamhoori Ittehad	
Punjab	NA-150 (Rahimyar Khan-IV)	Sardar Rais Shabbir Ahmed	Islami Jamhoori Ittehad	
Sindh	NA-151 (Sukkur-I)	Ali Hassan Manghi	Pakistan Peoples Party	
Sindh	NA-152 (Sukkur-II)	Faqir Abdul Haq alias Mian Mitho	Pakistan Peoples Party	
Sindh	NA-153 (Sukkur-III)	Haji Noor Muhammad Khan Lund	Pakistan Peoples Party	
Sindh	NA-154 (Shikarpur-I)	Agha Tariq Khan	Pakistan Peoples Party	
Sindh	NA-155 (Shikarpur-II)	Agha Atta Muhammad Khan	Pakistan Peoples Party	
Sindh	NA-156 (Jacobabad-I)	Sardar Muhammad Muqeem Khan Khoso	Pakistan Peoples Party	
Sindh	NA-157 (Jacobabad-II)	Mir Mehran Khan Bijarani	Pakistan Peoples Party	
Sindh	NA-158 (Nawabshah-I)	Syed Zafar Ali Shah	Pakistan Peoples Party	
Sindh	NA-159 (Nawabshah-II)	Haji Rehmatullah Behan	Pakistan Peoples Party	
Sindh	NA-160 (Nawabshah-III)	Hakim Ali Zardari	Pakistan Peoples Party	
Sindh	NA-161 (Nawabshah-IV)	Syed Shabir Ahmed Shah	Pakistan Peoples Party	
Sindh	NA-162 (Khairpur-I)	Syed Pervez Ali Shah Jillani	Pakistan Peoples Party	
Sindh	NA-163 (Khairpur-II)	Pir Syed Abdul Qadir Shah Jillani	Pakistan Peoples Party	
Sindh	NA-164 (Larkana-I)	Begum Nusrat Bhutto	Pakistan Peoples Party	
Sindh	NA-165 (Larkana-II)	Dr. Mrs. Ashraf Abbasi (Deputy Speaker, National Assembly of Pakistan)	Pakistan Peoples Party	
Sindh	NA-166 (Larkana-III)	Benazir Bhutto (Prime Minister of Pakistan)	Pakistan Peoples Party	
Sindh	NA-167 (Hyderabad-I)	Makhdoom Muhammad Amin Faheem	Pakistan Peoples Party	
Sindh	NA-168 (Hyderabad-II)	Aftab Ahmad Shaikh	Independent	
Sindh	NA-169 (Hyderabad-III)	Rashid Ahmed Khan	Pakistan Peoples Party	
Sindh	NA-170 (Hyderabad-IV)	Qazi Abdul Majid Abid	Pakistan Peoples Party	
Sindh	NA-171 (Hyderabad-V)	Makhdoom Khaleeq-uz-Zaman	Pakistan Peoples Party	
Sindh	NA-172 (Badin-I)	Haji Abdullah Halepoto	Pakistan Peoples Party	
Sindh	NA-173 (Badin-II)	Bashir Ahmed Halepoto	Pakistan Peoples Party	
Sindh	NA-174 (Tharparkar-I)	Syed Qurban Ali Shah	Pakistan Peoples Party	
Sindh	NA-175 (Tharparkar-II)	Ali Nawaz Shah	Pakistan Peoples Party	
Sindh	NA-176 (Tharparkar-III)	Arbab Amir Hassan	Independent	
Sindh	NA-177 (Dadu-I)	Malik Asad Sikandar	Pakistan Peoples Party	
Sindh	NA-178 (Dadu-II)	Haji Muhammad Bux Jamali	Pakistan Peoples Party	
Sindh	NA-179 (Dadu-III)	Haji Zaffar Ali Laghari	Pakistan Peoples Party	
Sindh	NA-180 (Sanghar-I)	Syed Ali Gohar Shah	Independent	
Sindh	NA-181 (Sanghar-II)	Shah Nawaz Junejo	Pakistan Peoples Party	
Sindh	NA-182 (Thatta-I)	Baboo Ghulam Hussain	Pakistan Peoples Party	
Sindh	NA-183 (Thatta-II)	Syed Ghulam Mustafa Shah	Pakistan Peoples Party	
Sindh	NA-184 (Karachi West-I)	Syed Amir Hyder Kazmi	Pakistan Peoples Party	
Sindh	NA-185 (Karachi West-II)	Syed Saleem-ul-Haq	Independent	
Sindh	NA-186 (Karachi Central-I)	Kunwar Khalid Younus	Independent	
Sindh	NA-187 (Karachi Central-II)	Dr. Imran Farooq	Independent	
Sindh	NA-188 (Karachi Central-III)	Syed Muhammad Aslam	Independent	
Sindh	NA-189 (Karachi South-I)	Abdul Rahim Baluch		
Sindh	NA-190 (Karachi South-II)	Dr. Muhammad Farooq Sattar	Independent	
Sindh	NA-191 (Karachi South-III)	Syed Tariq Mehmood	Independent	
Sindh	NA-192 (Karachi East-I)	Dr. Muhammad Rafique Essani		
Sindh	NA-193 (Karachi East-II)	Syed Muhammad Zakaria Kazmi	Independent	
Sindh	NA-194 (Karachi East-III)	Syed Aminul Haque	Independent	
Sindh	NA-195 (Karachi East-IV)	Syed Mahmood Hussain Hashmi	Independent	
Sindh	NA-196 (Karachi East-V)	Wasim Ahmed	Independent	
Balochistan	NA-197 (Quetta-cum-Chagai)	Hafiz Hussain Ahmed	JUI-F	
Balochistan	NA-198 (Pishin)	Maulvi Abdul Ghani	JUI-F	
Balochistan	NA-199 (Loralai)	Mir Baz Muhammad Khan Khetran	Pakistan Peoples Party	
Balochistan	NA-200 (Zhob)	Maulvi Muhammad Khan Sherani	JUI-F	
Balochistan	NA-201 (Kachhi)	Mir Tariq Hussain Magsi	Independent	
Balochistan	NA-202 (Sibi-cum-Kohlu-cum-Dera Bugti-cum-Ziarat)	Saleem Akbar Bugti	Independent	
Balochistan	NA-203 (Jaffarabad-cum-Tamboo)	Mir Nabi Bakhsh Khan Khoso		
Balochistan	NA-204 (Kalat-cum-Kharan)	Moulvi Muhammad Siddique Shah	JUI-F	
Balochistan	NA-205 (Khuzdar)	Mir Muhammad Arif	Balochistan National Alliance	
Balochistan	NA-206 (Lasbela-cum-Gwadar)	Ghulam Akbar Lasi	Islami Jamhoori Ittehad	
Balochistan	NA-207 (Turbat-cum-Panjgur)	Manzoor Ahmed Gichki	Balochistan National Alliance	

== Women members ==
=== Elected on general seats ===
Member	Political party	Constituency / constituencies won	Ref.
Nusrat Bhutto	PPP	NA-24 (Chitral), NA-164 (Larkana-I)	
Abida Hussain	Independent	NA-67 (Jhang-II), NA-68 (Jhang-III)	
Benazir Bhutto	PPP	NA-94 (Lahore), NA-166 (Larkana-III), NA-189 (Karachi South-I)	
Ashraf Khatoon Abbasi	PPP	NA-165 (Larkana-II)	

=== Reserved seats for women ===
Region	Member	Political party	Ref.
Punjab	Rehana Sarwar	PPP	
Punjab	Sarwari Sadiq	IJI	
Punjab	Nadir Khan Khakwani	PPP	
Punjab	Amina Paracha	PPP	
Punjab	Razia Sultana	Independent	
Punjab	Shahnaz Begum	PPP	
Punjab	Rehana Aleem Mashhadi	IJI	
Punjab	Shahnaz Wazir Ali	PPP	
Punjab	Abida Malik	PPP	
Punjab	Attiya Inayatullah	IJI	
Punjab	Aamira Ehsan	IJI	
Punjab	Nasreen Rao Rashid	PPP	
Sindh	Shamim N. D. Khan	PPP	
Sindh	Mehmooda Shah	PPP	
Sindh	Ruqia Khanum Soomro	PPP	
Sindh	Zareen Majeed	Haq Parast	
N.W.F.P.	Malik Mehr-un-Nisa Afridi	PPP	
N.W.F.P.	Kalsoom Saifullah	IJI	
Balochistan	Samina Razak	PPP	
Balochistan	Bibi Amina	JUI(F)	

== Non-Muslim members ==
Member	Community	Ref.
Rufin Julius	Christian	
George Clement	Christian	
Lt. Col. (Retd.) W. Herbert Baluch	Christian	
J. Salik	Christian	
Rana Chandar Singh	Hindu / Scheduled Castes	
Kishin Chand Parwani	Hindu / Scheduled Castes	
Assar Das	Hindu / Scheduled Castes	
Bhagwandas K. Chawala	Hindu / Scheduled Castes	
Byram D. Awari	Parsi / Sikh / Buddhists and others	
Malik Bashir-ud-Din Khalid	Ahmadi	
