= Member of the National Assembly of Pakistan =

Representative of the Pakistani people in the lower house of the Pakistani Parliament

Member of National Assembly Member of Parliament
- Emblem of Pakistan
- Flag of Pakistan
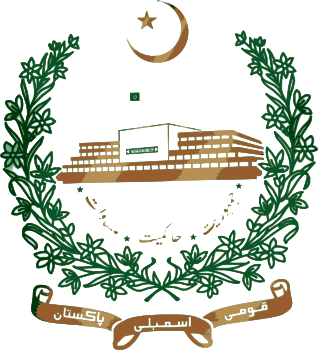
- Incumbent; List of members of the 16th National Assembly of Pakistan since 29 February 2024
- Status: Active
- Abbreviation: MNA
- Member of: National Assembly of Pakistan
- Reports to: Speaker
- Seat: Parliament of Pakistan
- Term length: 5 years; renewable
- Formation: 1973; 53 years ago
- Website: na.gov.pk

A Member of Parliament or Member of the National Assembly of Pakistan (abbreviated: MNA or MP) is a legislative constituency's representative in the National Assembly of Pakistan (Urdu: ایوانِ زیریں پاکستان), the Pakistan Parliament's lower house. On the basis of adult suffrage, National Assembly members are chosen through direct elections. The National Assembly of Pakistan is only allowed to have 336 total members of parliament or MNA. This includes 70 seats set aside for women and religious minorities from across Pakistan, and 266 members are directly elected through the election.

== Eligibility criteria ==
The following requirements must be met in order for someone to be eligible to join the National Assembly of Pakistan;

- Must be a citizen of Pakistan.
- Must not be less than 25 years of age.
- Must not be convicted by the court.
- Adequate knowledge of Islamic teachings.
- Must be a sound person.
- Must be sadiq (truthful) and ameen (trustworthy).
- Worked for the nation's integrity and ideology of Pakistan.
- Must be a voter for any parliamentary constituency in Pakistan.

== Disqualification grounds ==
A person wouldn't be qualified to serve as a member of Pakistan's National Assembly if he/she;

- Has an unsound mind.
- Is insolvent.
- Has ceased to be a citizen of Pakistan.
- Is so disqualified by any law made by the Pakistani parliament.
- Is so disqualified on the ground of defection.
- Has been convicted, among other things, for promoting enmity between different groups.
- Has been convicted for the offence of bribery.
- Has been convicted for an offence and sentenced to imprisonment of more than two years.
- Has been dismissed for corruption or for disloyalty to the state (in the case of a government servant).

== Term & conditions ==
A member of the National Assembly of Pakistan has a five-year tenure beginning on the day of their appointment.

== Responsibilities ==
The responsibilities of the members of the National Assembly of Pakistan are;

- Legislative: To make necessary legislation.
- Oversight: to ensure that the executive performs its duties satisfactorily.
- Representation: to speak for the opinions and desires of their constituents in the Pakistani Parliament.
- Power of the purse: to approve and control the government's proposed budgetary income and expenditures.

== Salary, allowances, and entitlements ==
Pakistan pays a lump sum including other allowances of Rs.188000 to the member of the National Assembly of Pakistan per month according to the 1974 Act. If the MNA has some extra designations, then the National Assembly pays extra allowances.

== Number of constituencies ==
Here is a list of how many National Assembly seats there were in each election year starting in 1954.

No.	Name	Term start	Term end	Constituencies
1	1st National Assembly of Pakistan	1947	1954	69
2	2nd National Assembly of Pakistan	1955	1958	72
3	3rd National Assembly of Pakistan	1962	1965	156
4	4th National Assembly of Pakistan	1965	1969	156
5	5th National Assembly of Pakistan	1972	1977	313
6	6th National Assembly of Pakistan	1977	1977	216
7	7th National Assembly of Pakistan	1985	1988	237
8	8th National Assembly of Pakistan	1988	1990	237
9	9th National Assembly of Pakistan	1990	1993	237
10	10th National Assembly of Pakistan	1993	1996	237
11	11th National Assembly of Pakistan	1997	1999	237
12	12th National Assembly of Pakistan	2002	2007	342
13	13th National Assembly of Pakistan	2008	2013	342
14	14th National Assembly of Pakistan	2013	2018	342
15	15th National Assembly of Pakistan	August 2018	2023	342
16	16th National Assembly of Pakistan	February 2024	Current	336

== See also ==
- Member of the Provincial Assembly
- List of members of the 15th National Assembly of Pakistan
- Constitution of Pakistan
- Parliament of Pakistan
