= Atta Muhammad Qureshi =

Pakistani politician

- عطا محمد قریشی
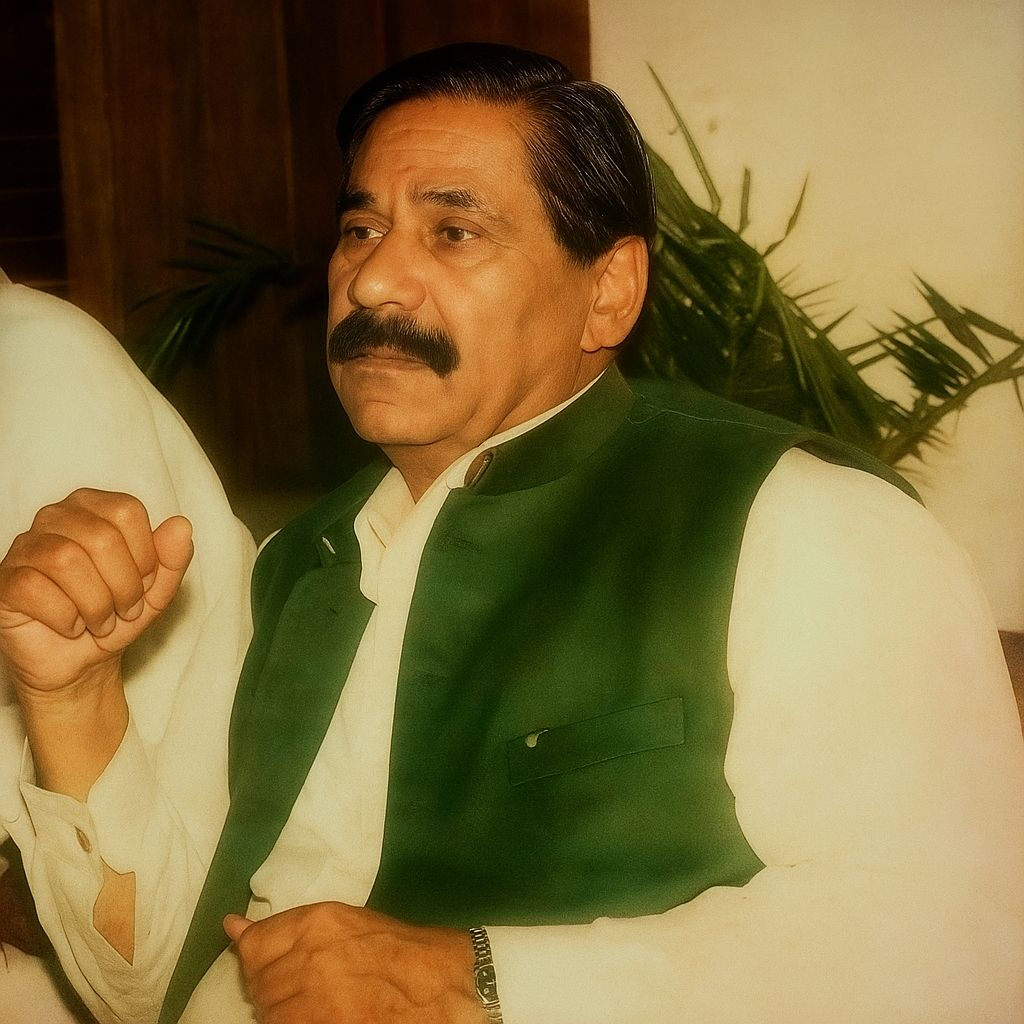

Member National Assembly
- Constituency: NA-136 Muzaffargarh
- In office 1990-93 & 1997-99
- Constituency: PP-192 Muzaffargarh

Member Provincial Assembly
- In office 1985-88

Personal details
- Born: 4 January 1933 Dedh Lal, Muzaffargarh, Pakistan
- Died: 2 January 2013 (aged 79) Multan, Punjab, Pakistan
- Resting place: Muzaffargarh
- Other political affiliations: Pakistan Muslim League (N) Pakistan Peoples Party
- Occupation: Politician

Atta Muhammad Qureshi (Urdu: عطا محمد قریشی ; born 4 January 1933 – 2013) was a prominent Pakistani politician & statesman from Muzaffargarh, who served as the Member of the National Assembly of Pakistan twice from 1990-93 & 1997-99. He was also elected as a Member of Provincial Assembly of the Punjab from 1985-88.

== Early life and education ==
Qureshi was born in a locality called Dedh Lal in Harpalo, Muzaffargarh. He gained his primary education in Muzaffargarh and then settled in Multan later. He was well versed in Urdu, Persian & Arabic. He was poet as well and penned few poems. He was a successful businessman too as he setup Flour & Ginning Mills in Muzaffargarh & dealt in trade of Petroleum Products.

== Political career ==
Qureshi began his political career in the era of Ayub Khan, he contested his first election in Ayub's non-party system in 1965 & was successfully elected as a member.

Qureshi then in 1970 joined Pakistan Peoples Party, and quickly became a close ally to Former Prime Minister of Pakistan Zulfiqar Ali Bhutto. He continued his political struggles with Bhutto and revered Bhutto's vision for Pakistan. However he did not participate in general elections until later in 1985.

Qureshi continued his political journey with Bhutto and was seen as a strong pillar of Muzaffargarh & South Punjab. After the arrest of Bhutto, General Zia ul Haq imposed martial law, Qureshi was arrested from his house in Multan as he was among the early members of PPP, was a vocal critic of the Martial Law and dictatorship and a staunch supporter of Bhutto. Qureshi was held as a political prisoner at the Lahore Fort for 7 years until 1984.

He was set free in 1984 and took part in the 1985 non-party General Elections for the Provincial Assembly of Punjab from PP-192. He was successful and won the seat with a heavy majority getting 22941 votes and became a Member of Punjab Assembly. In the tenure of Prime Minister Muhammad Khan Junejo, the then Chief Minister Punjab Nawaz Sharif, saw Qureshi as a strong political leader and former Bhutto loyalist from South Punjab and persuaded him to join Pakistan Muslim League (N).

He contested the 1990 General Elections for the seat of Member of National Assembly from NA-136 Muzaffargarh. He won with a heavy majority & defeated the likes of both Nawabzada Nasrullah Khan (Chairman Pakistan Democratic Party) also known as "Father of Democracy" & Ghulam Mustafa Khar (Former Governor of Punjab).

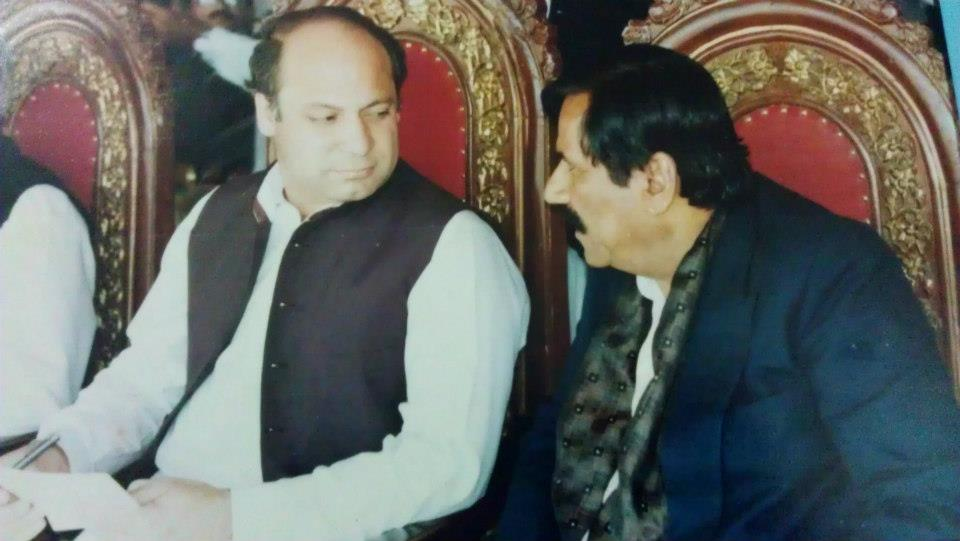
Atta Muhammad Qureshi (right) with Nawaz Sharif (left), address a rally in Muzaffargarh

Qureshi again contested General Elections in 1993 after the removal of the Sharif Government when fresh elections were called. This time Nawabzada Nasrullah Khan defeated Qureshi from Muzaffargarh.

After the removal of Prime Minister Benazir Bhutto's government in 1997. General Elections were called again and Qureshi again contested. Qureshi won again with a heavy majority against both Nawabzada and Khar and got his seat back & remained a Member of National Assembly of Pakistan until 1999 when Sharif Government was removed from power.

After the overthrow of Nawaz Sharif Government & imposing of Martial Law in 1999 by General Pervez Musharraf, Qureshi was forced into self-exile and chose to stay apart from politics but continued his services for the people of Muzaffargarh. Qureshi then retired from active politics and spent the rest of his life away from active politics and chose not to contest elections again, however he kept serving & helping the people especially in the 2010 floods in Pakistan, where he contributed immensely for his people.

== Personal life ==
Qureshi was married and had 5 children, including two sons (Former District Chairman Muzaffargarh) Tanveer Rasool Qureshi & Imran Rasool Qureshi.

== Death and legacy ==
Qureshi in 2013 had been ill for a few days and was admitted to Nishtar Hospital in Multan, where he died peacefully after a few days. The funeral prayers were offered for him in both Multan & his ancestral hometown of Dedhlal in Muzaffargarh where he was later laid to rest in his ancestral graveyard. People still revere him for his contributions to the uplifting of common people in Muzaffargarh, as no one till date has managed to make as big an impact as Qureshi for the people.
