= Rufin Julius =

Pakistani politician

Minister of State for Minorities Affairs
- In office 1989–1990
- Prime Minister: Benazir Bhutto

Member of the National Assembly of Pakistan
- In office 1990–1993
- Constituency: Non-Muslim reserved seat

Member of the National Assembly of Pakistan
- In office 1988–1990
- Constituency: Non-Muslim reserved seat

Personal details
- Spouse: Joyce Rofin Julius

Rufin Julius was a Pakistani politician and bishop. He served as Minister of State for Minorities Affairs in the first government of Benazir Bhutto and was twice a member of the National Assembly of Pakistan on reserved seats for non-Muslim minorities.

== Political career ==
Julius became a member of the 8th National Assembly on the reserved seats for minorities in 1988 and served until 1990. During the first government of Benazir Bhutto, he served as minister of state for minorities affairs.

He was again became a member of the 9th National Assembly, which sat from 1990 to 1993.

He remained active in minority politics after leaving office. In 2002, he called for the restoration of the separate electorate for minorities and argued that minority candidates could not effectively contest elections under the joint electorate system.

== Personal life ==
Julius's wife, Joyce Rofin Julius, later served as a member of the Provincial Assembly of the Punjab and as provincial minister for minorities affairs. He died on 12 December 2015.
