= National Assembly of Pakistan =

Lower house of the Parliament of Pakistan

National Assembly of Pakistan قومی اسمبلی پاکستان Qaumī Asamblī Pākistān
- 16th National Assembly of Pakistan
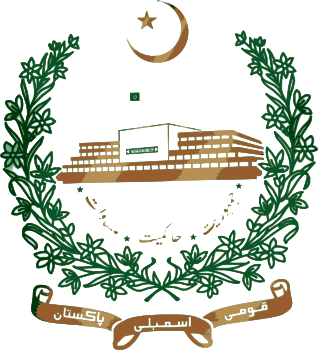
- Emblem of the National Assembly

Type
- Type: Lower house of the Parliament of Pakistan
- Term limits: 5 years

History
- Founded: March 23, 1956; 70 years ago
- New session started: 29 February 2024

Leadership
- Speaker: Ayaz Sadiq, PMLN since 1 March 2024
- Deputy Speaker: Ghulam Mustafa Shah, PPP since 1 March 2024
- Leader of the House: Shehbaz Sharif, PMLN since 3 March 2024
- Leader of the Opposition: Mahmood Khan Achakzai, PkMAP since 16 January 2026

Structure
- Seats: 336
- Political groups: Government (162): PMLN (132); PPP (74); MQM-P (23); PML(Q) (4); IND (4); IPP (4); PML(Z) (1); BAP (1); NP (1); Opposition (170): JUI (F) (10); PTI (75); PKNAP (1); MWM (1); PKMAP (1)

Elections
- Voting system: Mixed member majoritarian: 266 members elected by FPTP; 60 seats for women and 10 seats for non-Muslim minorities through PR
- First election: July 1947 (indirect) 7 December 1970 (direct)
- Last election: 8 February 2024
- Next election: By 28 February 2029

Meeting place
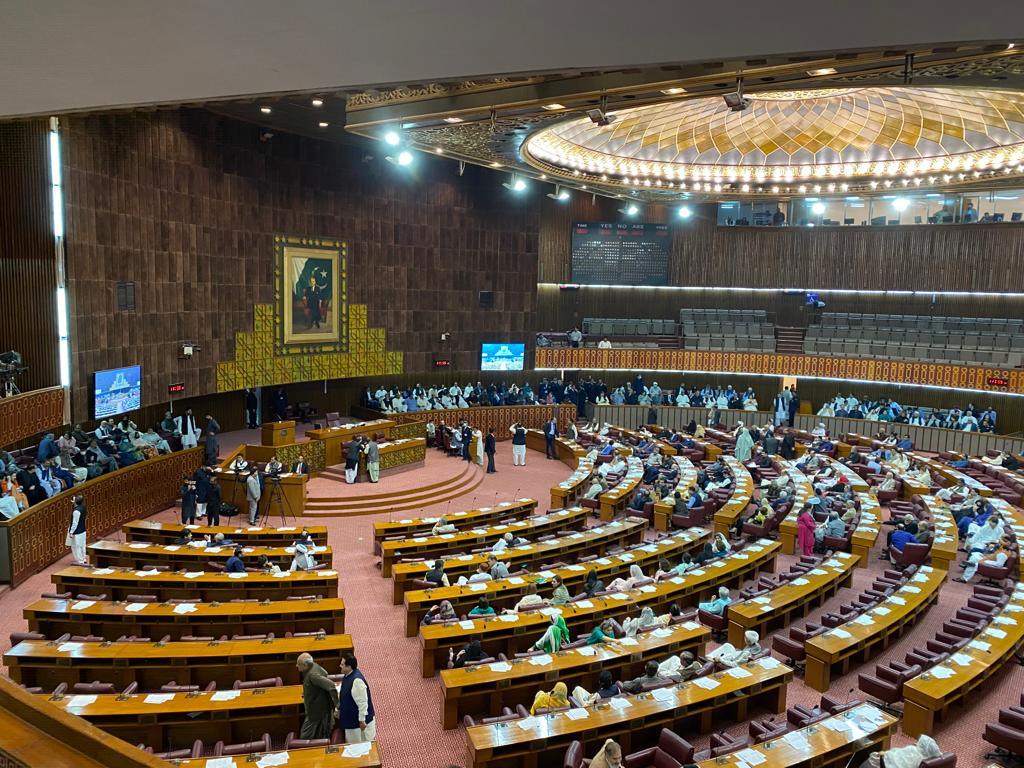
- National Assembly Secretariat; Parliament House; Red Zone, Islamabad

Website
- Official website

Constitution
- Constitution of Pakistan

The National Assembly of Pakistan (Note: Urdu: قومی اسمبلی, romanised: Qaumī Asamblī, pronounced [ˈqɔːmiː əˈsəmbliː]) is the lower house (Note: Urdu: ایوانِ زیریں, romanised: Aiwān-ē-Zairīñ, pronounced [ɛːʋɑːn-eː zɛːrĩː]) of the bicameral Parliament of Pakistan, with the Senate being the upper house. It has a maximum membership of 336, of which 266 are directly elected by universal suffrage with a first-past-the-post system to represent their respective constituencies, while 60 are proportionally elected on reserved seats for women and religious minorities from all over the country. Members of the National Assembly hold their seats for five years or until the house is dissolved by the president of Pakistan on the advice of the prime minister. The house convenes at the Parliament House in the Red Zone of Islamabad.

Established in 1956 upon promulgation of the first Pakistani constitution, the National Assembly succeeded the Constituent Assembly of Pakistan as the country's federal parliament — which remained unicameral until the formation of the Senate in 1973 under the current constitution. Initially existing as a directly-elected body, it became indirectly-elected under the Basic democracy system, introduced by Ayub Khan. It was restored to its original status of direct election in 1970.

Each assembly is formed for a five-year term, commencing from the date of its first meeting, after which it is automatically dissolved upon the term's completion. Following the passing of the eighteenth amendment, the National Assembly can only be prematurely dissolved by the president on the prime minister's advice. The 16th National Assembly is the latest to be elected in February 2024 and will continue till 2029 unless dissolved earlier.

The boundaries of the constituencies of the National Assembly are redrawn by the Election Commission of Pakistan after every national census, based on population. The last census was conducted in 2023 and the election in 2024 was based on it. All elections for the National Assembly are also conducted by the Election Commission of Pakistan.

== History ==
The first session of the first Constituent Assembly of Pakistan was held on 10 August 1947 at Sindh Assembly Building, in Karachi. On 11 August 1947, Quaid-i-Azam Muhammad Ali Jinnah was elected unanimously as the President of the Constituent Assembly of Pakistan and the National Flag was formally approved by the Assembly.

- On 12 August 1947, a resolution was approved regarding officially addressing Mr. Muhammad Ali Jinnah as "Quaid-i-Azam Muhammad Ali Jinnah". On the same day, a special committee called the "Committee on Fundamental Rights of Citizens and Minorities of Pakistan" was appointed to look into and advise the Assembly on matters relating to the fundamental rights of the citizens, particularly the minorities, to legislate on these issues appropriately.
- On 14 August 1947, Lord Mountbatten, Governor General of India, addressed the Constituent Assembly of Pakistan. The transfer of power took place on 15 August. The Quaid gave a reply to the address in the House, on which the principles of the State of Pakistan were laid.
- On 15 August 1947, Quaid-i-Azam was sworn in as the first Governor General of Pakistan. Sir Mian Abdul Rashid, Chief Justice of Pakistan, administered an oath of office from him. The Quaid remained in this position until his death on 11 September 1948.

== Powers ==
Legislative Process Chart of National Assembly of Pakistan

... you are now a sovereign legislative body and you have got all the powers. It, therefore, places on you the gravest responsibility as to how you should take your decisions.

— Muhammad Ali Jinnah, in his presidential address to the First Constituent Assembly of Pakistan on 11 August 1947

The Constitution, which was passed unanimously by the National Assembly in April 1973, provides a federal parliamentary system of government, with the president as the ceremonial head of the state and an elected prime minister as the head of the government. Under Article 50 of the Constitution, the federal legislature is the bicameral Majlis-e-Shoora (Parliament), which comprises the President and the two Houses, the National Assembly and the Senate. The National Assembly, Pakistan's sovereign legislative body, makes laws for the federation under powers spelled out in the federal legislative List and also for subjects in the concurrent List, as given in the fourth schedule of the Constitution. Through debates, adjournment motions, question hours, and standing committees, the National Assembly keeps a check on the government. It ensures that the government functions within the parameters set out in the Constitution, and does not violate the people's fundamental rights. The Parliament scrutinises public spending and exercises control of expenditure incurred by the government through the work of the relevant standing committees. The Public Accounts Committee has a special role in reviewing the report of the auditor general. The Senate, the upper house of the Parliament, has equal representation from the federating units balancing the provincial inequality in the National Assembly, where the number of members is based on population of the provinces. The Senate's role is to promote national cohesion and harmony and work as a stabilising factor of the federation. The Senate has 104 members who serve six-year terms which are alternated so that half the senators are up for re-election by the electoral college every three years. The National Assembly consists of 342 members. The Constitution does not empower the President to dissolve the National Assembly. The Senate is not subject to dissolution. Only the Parliament can amend the Constitution, by a two-thirds majority vote separately in each House.

== List of Assemblies ==
No.	Name	Term start	Term end
1	1st National Assembly of the Pakistan	1947	1954
2	2nd National Assembly of the Pakistan	1955	1958
3	3rd National Assembly of the Pakistan	1962	1965
4	4th National Assembly of the Pakistan	1965	1969
5	5th National Assembly of the Pakistan	1972	1977
6	6th National Assembly of the Pakistan	1977	1977
7	7th National Assembly of the Pakistan	1985	1988
8	8th National Assembly of Pakistan	1988	1990
9	9th National Assembly of Pakistan	1990	1993
10	10th National Assembly of the Pakistan	1993	1996
11	11th National Assembly of the Pakistan	1997	1999
12	12th National Assembly of the Pakistan	2002	2007
13	13th National Assembly of the Pakistan	2008	2013
14	14th National Assembly of the Pakistan	2013	2018
15	15th National Assembly of the Pakistan	2018	2023
16	16th National Assembly of Pakistan	2024	present

== Members of the National Assembly ==
=== Qualifications ===
The Constitution of Pakistan lists several requirements for members of the National Assembly in Article 62.

The constitution also details several disqualifications in Article 63, which include mental instability, insolvency, criminal conviction and accepting dual-citizenship or relinquishing Pakistani nationality, among others. Furthermore, candidates found to have opposed Pakistan's ideology or worked against the integrity of the country, after its establishment in 1947, are disqualified.

=== National Assembly Composition ===
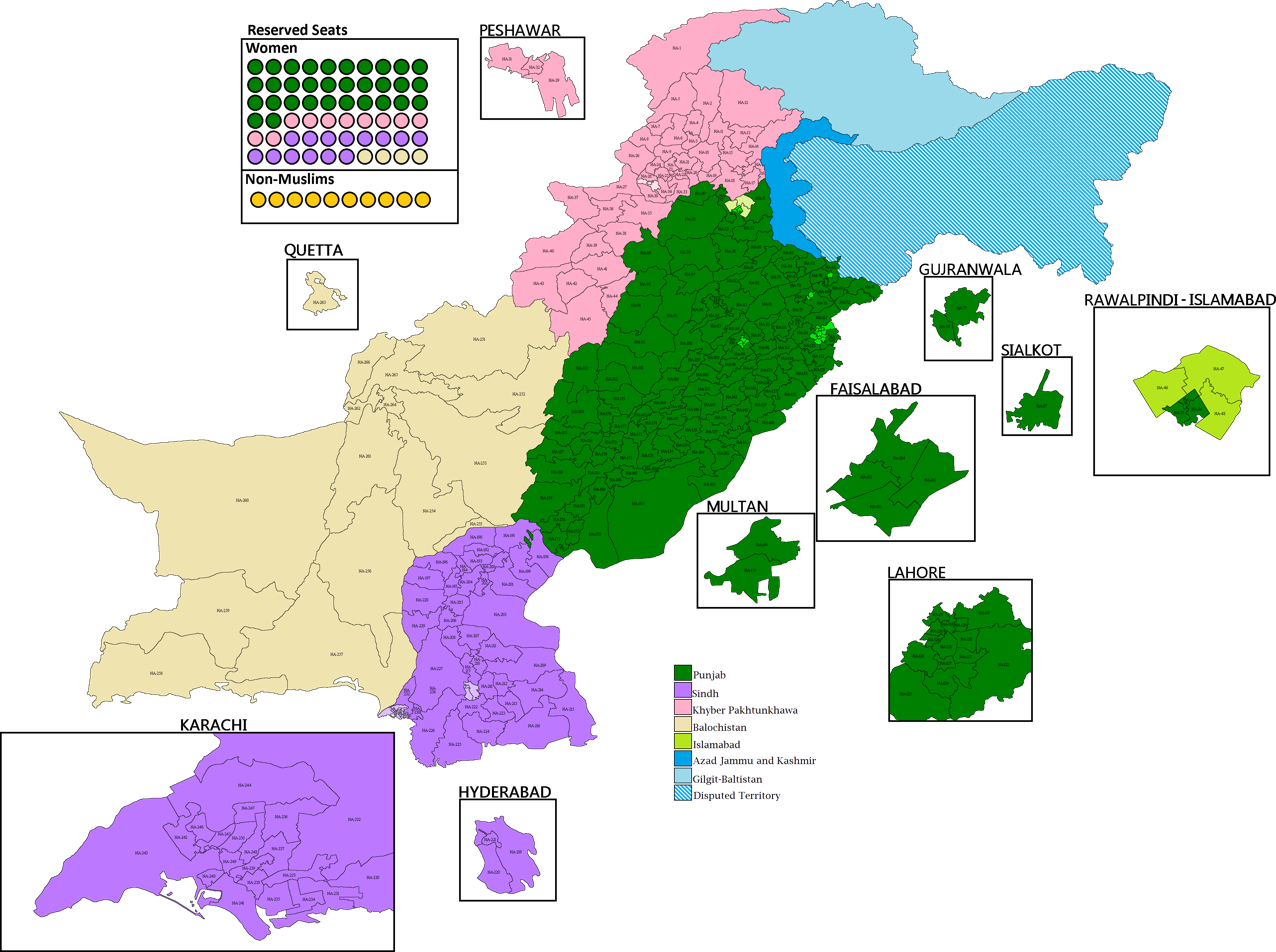
Constituencies map of national assembly after delimitation in 2022

The National Assembly has 336 members, including 60 seats reserved for women and 10 for Non-Muslims, as per Article 51. The seats in the National Assembly are allocated to each province and the federal capital based on population, as officially published in the preceding census. The present allocation of seats is as under:

Composition of National Assembly of Pakistan
Province/Area	General Seats	Women	Non-Muslims	Total
Punjab	141	32		173
Sindh	61	14		75
Khyber Pakhtunkhwa	45	10		55
Balochistan	16	4		20
Federal Capital	3			3
At-large			10	10
Total	266	60	10	336

=== Tenure ===
The National Assembly is elected for a five-year term based on adult franchise and one person, one vote. The tenure of a Member of the National Assembly is for the duration of the House, or sooner, in case the Member dies or resigns. The tenure of the National Assembly also comes to an end if dissolved on the advice of the Prime Minister or by the President in his discretion under the Constitution. Under the 1973 Constitution, a member of Parliament may not hold the office of the prime minister more than twice. In the 1990s, Benazir Bhutto and Nawaz Sharif proposed a bill to amend the 1973 constitution to allow a Member to serve a third term as prime minister.

== Speaker and deputy speaker ==
According to The Constitution

- (1) After a general election, the National Assembly shall, at its first meeting and to the exclusion of any other business, elect from amongst its members a Speaker and a Deputy Speaker and, so often as the office of Speaker or Deputy Speaker becomes vacant, the Assembly shall elect another member as Speaker or, as the case may be, Deputy Speaker.
- (2) Before entering upon office, a member elected as Speaker or Deputy Speaker shall make before the National Assembly oath in the form set out in the Third Schedule.
- (3) When the office of Speaker is vacant, or the Speaker is absent or is unable to perform his functions due to any cause, the Deputy Speaker shall act as Speaker, and if, at that time, the Deputy Speaker is also absent or is unable to act as Speaker due to any cause, such member as may be determined by the rules of procedure of the Assembly shall preside at the meeting of the Assembly.
- (4) The Speaker or the Deputy Speaker shall not preside at a meeting of the Assembly when a resolution for his removal from office is being considered.
- (5) The Speaker may, by writing under his hand addressed to the President, resign his office.
- (6) The Deputy Speaker may, by writing under his hand addressed to the Speaker, resign his office.
- (7) The office of Speaker or Deputy Speaker shall become vacant if:
1. (a) he resigns his office;
2. (b) he ceases to be a member of the Assembly;
3. (c) he is removed from office by a resolution of the Assembly, of which not less than seven days' notice has been given and which is passed by the votes of the majority of the total membership of the Assembly.
- (8) When the National Assembly is dissolved the Speaker shall continue in his office till the person elected to fill the office by the next Assembly enters upon his office.

The Speaker of the House is the presiding officer of the National Assembly. The speaker is assisted by the Deputy Speaker. Both officers are elected from within the ranks of the National Assembly and, by current convention, are usually members of the majority party. The election of the two officers is the first matter an incoming National Assembly deals with, as mandated by the constitution. Apart from presiding over National Assembly debates, the Speaker may also assume the duties of Acting President, if the position is vacant (in case the President as well as Chairman Senate are not available).

The current Speaker and Deputy Speaker are Ayaz Sadiq (PMLN) and Syed Ghulam Mustafa Shah (PPP) respectively.

== Sessions ==
The National Assembly is divided into sessions. It had to meet for 130 days before the First Amendment was passed on 8 May 1974 in the constitution of 1973. According to this amendment, the maximum duration between successive sessions was reduced to 90 days from 130 days, and there must be at least three sessions in a year. A session of the National Assembly is summoned by the President under Article 54(1) of the Constitution. In the summoning order, the President gives the date, time, and place (usually the Parliament House), for the National Assembly to meet. The date and time for the summoning of the National Assembly is immediately announced over radio and television. Generally, a copy of the summon is also sent to the Members at their home addresses. The National Assembly can also be summoned by the Speaker of the National Assembly on a request made by one-fourth of the total membership of the National Assembly. If the National Assembly is so requisitioned, it must be summoned within 14 days.

== Procedure ==
=== Constitutional role ===
Article 50 of the Constitution provides that the Parliament shall consist of the president and the two houses known as the National Assembly and the Senate. The National Assembly has an edge over the Senate by legislating exclusively on money matters. With exception to money bills, however, both houses work together to carry out the basic work of the Parliament, i.e. law-making.

=== Legislative procedures ===
The bill relating to the Federal Legislative List can be originated in either house. If the House passes a bill through a majority vote, it shall be transmitted to the other place. If the other house passes it without amendment, it shall be presented to the President for assent.

If the bill, transmitted to the other house, is not passed within ninety days or rejected, it shall be considered in a joint sitting to be summoned by the President at the request of the house in which the bill was originated. If the bill is passed in the joint sitting, with or without amendments, by the votes of the majority of the members of the two houses, it shall be presented to the President for assent.

If the bill is presented to the President for assent, he shall assent to the bill in not later than ten days. If it is not a money bill, the President may return it to the Majlis-e-Shoora with a message requesting that the bill be reconsidered and an amendment specified in the message be considered. The Majlis-e-Shoora shall reconsider the bill in a joint sitting. If the bill is passed again, with or without amendment, by a vote of the majority of the members present and voting, it shall be presented to the President and the President shall give his assent within ten days; failing which such assent shall be deemed to have been given.

Under the Constitution, the Parliament may also legislate for two or more provinces by consent and request made by those provinces. If the federal government proclaims a state of emergency in any province, the power to legislate about that province is vested in the Parliament. But the bills passed by the Parliament during the state of emergency shall cease to be in force after the expiration of six months from the date that the emergency is lifted. Nevertheless, the steps already taken under these acts shall remain valid.

== Leaders ==
=== Leader of the House ===
The Leader of the House is the highest-ranking representative of the majority party in the National Assembly, usually the Prime Minister.

=== Leader of the Opposition ===
The Leader of the Opposition is the highest-ranking representative of the main opposition party.

== Committees ==
While recognising the Committee System, the committees have been empowered to go into all matters of the ministry. A matter can be remitted to a standing committee by the Speaker or the Assembly suo moto and without moving any motion.

The committees have also been empowered to invite or summon before it any member or any other person having a special interest in any matter under its consideration and may hear expert evidence and hold public hearings.

== Pasban-e-Aman Force ==
In 2023 the National Assembly Secretariat would constitute the Pasban-e-Aman (پاسبان امان) Force for the security of the Parliament House. According to the article, the majority of Pasban-e-Aman Force personnel belong to Gujar Khan, the constituency of then NA Speaker Raja Pervez Ashraf. The force is charged with the security of Parliament House and the National Assembly. Security responsibilities the Parliament House has been shifted from Frontier Corps to the new force. Pasban-e-Aman Force Personnel were given anti-terrorism training near Simly Dam, by September 15, 2023 three batches had finished their training. The uniform of the Pasban-e-Aman resembles to that of Elite Force having ATS sign on caps and Pasban-e-Aman written on the right shoulder.

== Composition and elections ==
The Parliament of Pakistan, according to the Constitution of 1973, is bicameral. Article 50 of the Constitution clearly states that the Parliament of Pakistan consists of the President and two Houses known as the National Assembly and the Senate. The composition of the National Assembly is specified in Article 51 of the Constitution of Pakistan. Originally there were 210 National Assembly seats including 10 women which was increased to 237 in 1985 and later to 342. Currently, there are a total of 342 seats in the National Assembly. Of these, 266 are filled by direct elections. In addition, the Pakistani Constitution reserves 10 seats for religious minorities and 60 seats for women, to be filled by proportional representation among parties with more than 5% of the vote. After the 25th Amendment Article 51. (1) There shall be [three hundred and thirty-six] seats for members in the National Assembly, including seats reserved for women and non-Muslims. Article 51. [(3A) Notwithstanding anything contained in clause (3) or any other law for the time being in force, the members of the National Assembly from the Federally Administered Tribal Areas to be elected in the general elections, 2018 shall continue till the dissolution of the National Assembly and thereafter this clause shall stand omitted.

Members of the National Assembly are elected by the people in competitive multi-party elections, to be held at most five years apart on universal adult franchise. To be a member of the electoral college, according to Article 62 of the Constitution, candidates must be citizens of Pakistan and not less than 25 years of age.

== 2024 election ==
The election was postponed in the NA-8 Bajaur constituency in Khyber Pakhtunkhwa due to the killing of candidate Rehan Zeb Khan. Provincial assembly elections were also postponed in the constituencies of PK-22 and PK-91 (both in Khyber Pakhtunkhwa) due to the deaths of candidates there.

Vote share of Pakistan Tehreek-e-Insaf

Vote share of Pakistan Muslim League (N)

Vote share of Pakistan Peoples Party

Party	Votes	%	Seats			
Party	Votes	%	General	Women	Minority	Total
Pakistan Tehreek-e-Insaf independents	18,457,567	31.17	93	0	0	93
Pakistan Muslim League (N)	13,999,656	23.64	75	19	4	98
Pakistan People's Party	8,244,944	13.92	54	12	2	68
Tehreek-e-Labbaik Pakistan	2,888,619	4.88	0	0	0	0
Jamiat Ulema-e-Islam (F)	2,163,160	3.65	5	2	0	7
Jamaat-e-Islami Pakistan	1,336,698	2.26	0	0	0	0
Grand Democratic Alliance	1,180,866	1.99	0	0	0	0
Muttahida Qaumi Movement – Pakistan	1,119,962	1.89	18	4	0	22
Istehkam-e-Pakistan Party	648,827	1.10	3	1	0	4
Awami National Party	622,115	1.05	1	0	0	1
Pakistan Muslim League (Q)	339,518	0.57	3	1	0	4
Pakistan Markazi Muslim League	205,768	0.35	0	0	0	0
Pashtunkhwa National Awami Party	166,640	0.28	1	0	0	1
Balochistan National Party (Mengal)	162,988	0.28	1	0	0	1
Pakistan Rah-e-Haq Party	119,864	0.20	0	0	0	0
Pakistan Muslim League (Z)	109,570	0.19	1	0	0	1
Pakistan Tehreek-e-Insaf Parliamentarians	96,089	0.16	0	0	0	0
Balochistan Awami Party	90,985	0.15	1	0	0	1
National Party	68,741	0.12	1	0	0	1
Pashtunkhwa Milli Awami Party	64,544	0.11	1	0	0	1
Majlis Wahdat-e-Muslimeen	61,899	0.10	1	0	0	1
Others	507,571	0.86	0	0	0	0
Independents	6,564,486	11.08	7	0	0	7
Total	59,221,077	100.00	266	39	6	311
Source: ECP, BBC, Tribune Gallup

== Dissolution ==
The National Assembly can be dissolved at the initiative of the Prime Minister. If dissolved, new elections are conducted for the Assembly. Article 58 of the Constitution of Pakistan deals with the dissolution of the Assembly:

58. Dissolution of the National Assembly:

(1) The President shall dissolve the National Assembly if so advised by the Prime Minister; and the National Assembly shall, unless sooner dissolved, stand dissolved at the expiration of forty-eight hours after the Prime Minister has so advised.

Explanation: Reference in this Article to "Prime Minister" shall not be construed to include reference to a Prime Minister against whom a notice of a resolution for a vote of no-confidence has been given in the National Assembly but has not been voted upon or against whom such a resolution has been passed or who is continuing in office after his resignation or after the dissolution of the National Assembly.

(2) Notwithstanding anything contained in clause (2) or Article 48, the President may dissolve the National Assembly at his discretion where a vote of no-confidence having been passed against the Prime Minister, no other member of the National Assembly commands the confidence of the majority of the members of the National Assembly by the provisions of the Constitution, as ascertained in a session of the National Assembly summoned for the purpose.

== See also ==
- Constitution of Pakistan
- List of constituencies of Pakistan
- Member of the National Assembly of Pakistan
- List of provincial assemblies of Pakistan
- Member of the Provincial Assembly
- Politics of Pakistan
- List of Pakistanis
- Pakistan
