= Junejo government =

Pakistani Federal Government (1985–1988)

Muhammad Khan Junejo Government
- 25th, 26th and 27th Cabinet of Pakistan
- 1985-1988
- Junejo (right) receives the oath of office from Zia-ul-Haq (left), marking the beginning of the government.
- Date formed: 10 April 1985
- Date dissolved: 30 May 1988

People and organisations
- Head of state: Muhammad Zia-ul-Haq
- Head of government: Muhammad Khan Junejo
- Member party: Pakistan Muslim League (Note: All politicians were registered as independent and the National Assembly was solely composed of independents.)
- Status in legislature: Independent government 237 / 237 (100%)

History
- Election: 1985
- Predecessor: Zia-ul-Haq administration
- Successor: Zia-ul-Haq administration

The Junejo government was formed on April 10, 1985, when Muhammad Khan Junejo became the prime minister of Pakistan. His tenure began under the influence of military president Muhammad Zia-ul-Haq, who maintained control over key appointments, including several federal cabinet ministers.

Known for his non-confrontational governance style, Junejo, a conservative member of the Pakistan Muslim League, directed administration officers to monitor the activities of parliament members, aiming to curb personal gains such as permits and plots, which eventually led to bureaucratic manipulations that weakened his rapport with parliamentarians.

Despite multiple efforts by the National Assembly to end martial law, General Zia repeatedly deferred its lifting, stating it would end at an "appropriate time." The assembly passed a unanimous resolution on May 26, 1985, demanding the cessation of martial law, which mirrored calls from provincial assemblies. However, General Zia, who had already planned the timeline for ending martial law since 1983, disregarded these demands, maintaining his presidential authority and continuing to exercise control over the government through the Revival of the Constitution Order.

On May 30, 1988, President Muhammad Zia ul-Haq dissolved the National Assembly of Pakistan and dismissed Junejo, citing the lawmakers' failure to maintain law and order. The announcement came shortly after Prime Minister Junejo's return from a state visit of China, South Korea, and the Philippines. The President stated that the decision was driven by the legislators' inability to uphold law and order and to advance the establishment of an Islamic society.

== First cabinet ==
=== Federal ministers ===
Name	Portfolio	Period
Muhammad Khan Junejo	Cabinet Secretariat, Culture & Tourism, Defence, Education, Food, Agriculture and Co-operatives, Health, Special Education & Social Welfare, Interior, Petroleum & Natural Resources, Religious Affairs and Minorities Affairs, Science and Technology, States & Frontier Regions, Kashmir Affairs & Northern Affairs, Railways	10 April 1985 to 28 January 1986
Salim Saifullah Khan	Commerce, Petroleum & Natural Resources	10 April 1985 to 28 January 1986
Mohyuddin Ahmedzai Baloch	Communications	10 April 1985 to 28 January 1986
Mahbub ul Haq	Finance & Economic Affairs, Planning & Development	10 April 1985 to 28 January 1986
Sahabzada Yaqub Khan	Foreign Affairs	10 April 1985 to 28 January 1986
Yousaf Raza Gilani	Housing & Works	10 April 1985 to 28 January 1986
Syed Zafar Ali Shah	Industries, Food, Agriculture & Cooperatives	10 April 1985 to 28 January 1986
Hamid Nasir Chattha	Information & Broadcasting, Health, Special Education & Social Welfare	10 April 1985 to 28 January 1986
Iqbal Ahmad Khan	Justice & Parliamentary Affairs	10 April 1985 to 28 January 1986
Hanif Tayyab	Labour, Manpower & Overseas Pakistanis	10 April 1985 to 28 January 1986
Ghulam Muhammad Ahmad Khan Maneka	Local Government & Rural Development, Culture and Tourism	10 April 1985 to 28 January 1986
Khaqan Abbasi	Production, Education	10 April 1985 to 28 January 1986
Abdul Ghafoor Hoti	Railways	10 April 1985 to 30 December 1985
Zafarullah Khan Jamali	Water & Power	10 April 1985 to 28 January 1986
Jamal Said Mian	Culture & Tourism	21 May 1985 to 28 January 1986
Yasin Wattoo	Education	22 May 1985 to 28 January 1986
Qazi Abdul Majeed Abid	Food, Agriculture and Cooperatives	21 May 1985 to 28 January 1986
Nur Hayat Noon	Health, Special Education & Social Welfare	21 May 1985 to 28 January 1986
Aslam Khattak	Interior	21 May 1985 to 28 January 1986
Syed Qasim Shah	States & Frontier Regions & Kashmir Affairs	21 May 1985 to 28 January 1986

=== Ministers of state ===
Name	Portfolio	Period
Haji Tareen	Food, Agriculture & Cooperatives	10 April 1985 to 28 January 1986
Zain Noorani	Foreign Affairs	10 April 1985 to 28 January 1986
Rai Mansab Ali Khan	Labour, Manpower and Overseas Pakistanis	10 April 1985 to 28 January 1986
Attiya Inayatullah	Population Welfare	10 April 1985 to 28 January 1986
Islamuddin Shaikh	Production	10 April 1985 to 28 January 1986
Maqbool Ahmed	Religious Affairs & Minorities Affairs	10 April 1985 to 28 January 1986
Shah Mohammad Khuro	Interior	21 May 1985 to 28 January 1986
Mohammad Asad Khan	Petroleum & Natural Resources	5 August 1985 to 28 January 1986

== Second cabinet ==
As part of a cabinet reshuffle, Prime Minister Junejo made some changes to his cabinet. The newly appointed ministers took office in January 1986.

=== Federal ministers ===
Name	Portfolio	Period
Muhammad Khan Junejo	Cabinet Secretariat, Defence, Planning & Development	28 January 1986 to 20 December 1986
Mohyuddin Ahmedzai Baloch	Commerce	28 January 1986 to 29 October 1986
Nur Hayat Noon	Communications	28 January 1986 to 20 December 1986
Ghulam Muhammad Ahmed Khan Maneka	Culture & Tourism	28 January 1986 to 20 December 1986
Malik Naseem Ahmed Aheer	Education	28 January 1986 to 20 December 1986
Yasin Wattoo	Finance and Economic Affairs	28 January 1986 to 20 December 1986
Qazi Abdul Majeed Abid	Food, Agriculture and Cooperatives	28 January 1986 to 20 December 1986
Sahabzada Yaqub Khan	Foreign Affairs	28 January 1986 to 20 December 1986
Shah Muhammad Khuro	Health, Special Education and Social Welfare	28 January 1986 to 20 December 1986
Salim Saifullah Khan	Housing and Works	28 January 1986 to 20 December 1986
Syed Zafar Ali Shah	Industries	28 January 1986 to 20 December 1986
Shujaat Hussain	Information and Broadcasting	28 January 1986 to 20 December 1986
Aslam Khattak	Interior	28 January 1986 to 20 December 1986
Iqbal Ahmed Khan	Justice and Parliamentary Affairs, Religious Affairs and Minorities Affairs	28 January 1986 to 28 September 1986
Maqsood Ahmed Khan Leghari	Labour, Manpower and Overseas Pakistanis	28 January 1986 to 20 December 1986
Anwar Aziz Chaudhry	Local Government & Rural Development	28 January 1986 to 20 December 1986
Hanif Tayyab	Petroleum & Natural Resources	28 January 1986 to 20 December 1986
Khaqan Abbasi	Production	28 January 1986 to 20 December 1986
Yousaf Raza Gilani	Railways	28 January 1986 to 20 December 1986
Haji Tareen	Religious Affairs & Minorities Affairs, Science & Technology	28 January 1986 to 28 August 1986
Hamid Nasir Chattha	Science & Technology	28 January 1986 to 31 May 1986
Syed Qasim Shah	States & Frontier Regions & Kashmir Affairs	28 January 1986 to 20 December 1986
Jamal Said Mian	Water & Power	28 January 1986 to 20 December 1986
Mahbub ul Haq	Planning & Development	12 February 1986 to 20 December 1986
Wasim Sajjad	Justice & Parliamentary Affairs	28 September 1986 to 20 December 1986

=== Ministers of state ===
Name	Portfolio	Period
Tasneem Gardezi	Commerce	28 January 1986 to 20 December 1986
Ibrahim Baloch	Communications	28 January 1986 to 20 December 1986
Mehran Bijarani	Culture and Tourism	28 January 1986 to 20 December 1986
Nisar Ali Khan Baloch	Education	28 January 1986 to 20 December 1986
Sartaj Aziz	Food, Agriculture & Cooperatives	28 January 1986 to 28 September 1986
Zain Noorani	Foreign Affairs	28 January 1986 to 20 December 1986
Haji Muhammad Unis Elahi	Industries	28 January 1986 to 20 December 1986
Rai Mansab Ali Khan	Labour, Manpower and Overseas Pakistanis	28 January 1986 to 20 December 1986
Mir Nawaz Khan Marwat	Justice & Parliamentary Affairs	28 January 1986 to 20 December 1986
Islamuddin Shaikh	Production	28 January 1986 to 20 December 1986
Nisar Mohammad Khan	Railways	28 January 1986 to 20 December 1986
Maqbool Ahmed Khan	Religious Affairs and Minorities Affairs	28 January 1986 to 20 December 1986
Begum Afsar Riza Qizilbash	Health, Special Education and Social Welfare	28 January 1986 to 20 December 1986

== Third cabinet ==
As part of a cabinet reshuffle, Prime Minister Junejo removed several ministers. The new ministers were sworn in during December 1986.

=== Federal ministers ===
Name	Portfolio	Period
Malik Naseem Ahmed Aheer	Education, Communications, Health, Special Education & Social Welfare, Culture & Tourism, Interior	22 December 1986 to 29 May 1988
Yasin Wattoo	Finance & Economic Affairs, Petroleum & Natural Resources	22 December 1986 to 29 May 1988
Ibrahim Baluch	Food, Agriculture and Cooperatives, Labour, Manpower & Overseas Pakistanis	22 December 1986 to 29 May 1988
Sahabzada Yaqub Khan	Foreign Affairs	22 December 1986 to 1 November 1987
Hanif Tayyab	Housing & Works, Petroleum & Natural Resources	22 December 1986 to 29 May 1988
Shujaat Hussain	Industries, Production	22 December 1986 to 29 May 1988
Qazi Abdul Majeed Abid	Information & Broadcasting, Water & Power	22 December 1986 to 29 May 1988
Aslam Khattak	Interior, Culture & Tourism, Communications, Railways	22 December 1986 to 29 May 1988
Wasim Sajjad	Justice & Parliamentary Affairs, Interior	22 December 1986 to 29 May 1988
Anwar Aziz Chaudhry	Local Government & Rural Development	22 December 1986 to 2 June 1987
Syed Qasim Shah	States & Frontier Regions and Kashmir Affairs, Religious Affairs & Minorities Affairs	22 December 1987 to 29 May 1988
Iqbal Ahmed Khan	Federal Minister Without Portfolio, Local Government & Rural Development	22 December 1987 to 29 May 1988
Mahbub ul Haq	Commerce, Planning & Development, Population Welfare	29 March 1987 to 29 May 1988
Shah Muhammad Khuro	Culture & Tourism, Labour, Manpower & Overseas Pakistanis	29 March 1987 to 29 May 1988
Muhammad Saifullah Khan	Religious Affairs & Minorities Affairs	29 March 1987 to 29 May 1988
Nisar Mohammad Khan	Culture & Tourism	28 July 1987 to 29 May 1988
Syed Sajjad Haider	Education, Health, Special Education & Social Welfare	28 July 1987 to 29 May 1988
Mohammad Bashir Khan	Production	28 July 1987 to 29 May 1988
Mian Ghulam Muhammad Ahmed Khan Maneka	Establishment Division, O & M Division	15 May 1988 to 29 May 1988
Malik Muhammad Naeem Khan	Health, Special Education & Social Welfare, Science and Technology	15 May 1988 to 29 May 1988
Kulsum Saifullah Khan	Population Welfare, O & M Division	15 May 1988 to 29 May 1988
Sardarzada Muhammad Ali Shah	Railways	15 May 1988 to 29 May 1988
Wazir Ahmad Jogezai	Water and Power	15 May 1988 to 29 May 1988

=== Ministers of state ===
Name	Portfolio	Period
Zain Noorani	Foreign Affairs (with Cabinet rank)	22 December 1986 to 29 May 1988
Sardar Ghulam Muhammad Khan Mahar	Health Division	22 December 1986 to 29 December 1987
Nisar Mohammad Khan	Railways	22 December 1986 to 28 July 1987
Begum Afsar Riza Qizilbash	Special Education and Social Welfare	22 December 1986 to 29 May 1988
Kulsum Saifullah Khan	Commerce	29 March 1987 to 15 May 1988
Fateh Muhammad Muhammad Hassni	Communications	29 March 1987 to 29 May 1988
Rana Naeem Mahmood Khan	Defence	29 March 1987 to 29 May 1988
Mian Muhammad Zaman	Industries	29 March 1987 to 29 May 1988
Raja Nadir Pervaiz	Interior	29 March 1987 to 29 May 1988
Abdul Sattar Laleka	Labour, Manpower & Overseas Pakistanis	29 March 1987 to 29 May 1988
Chaudhry Nisar Ali Khan	Petroleum and Natural Resources	29 March 1987 to 29 May 1988
Mohammad Bashir Khan	Production	29 March 1987 to 28 July 1987
Malik Said Khan Mahsud	Water & Power	29 March 1987 to 29 May 1988
Syed Iftikhar Ali Bokhari	Finance and Economic Affairs	15 May 1988 to 29 May 1988
Tasneem Gardezi	Information and Broadcasting	15 May 1988 to 29 May 1988
Agha Atta Muhammad Khan	Railways	15 May 1988 to 29 May 1988
