= List of members of the 7th National Assembly of Pakistan =

7th National Assembly
←	6th National Assembly	8th National Assembly	→
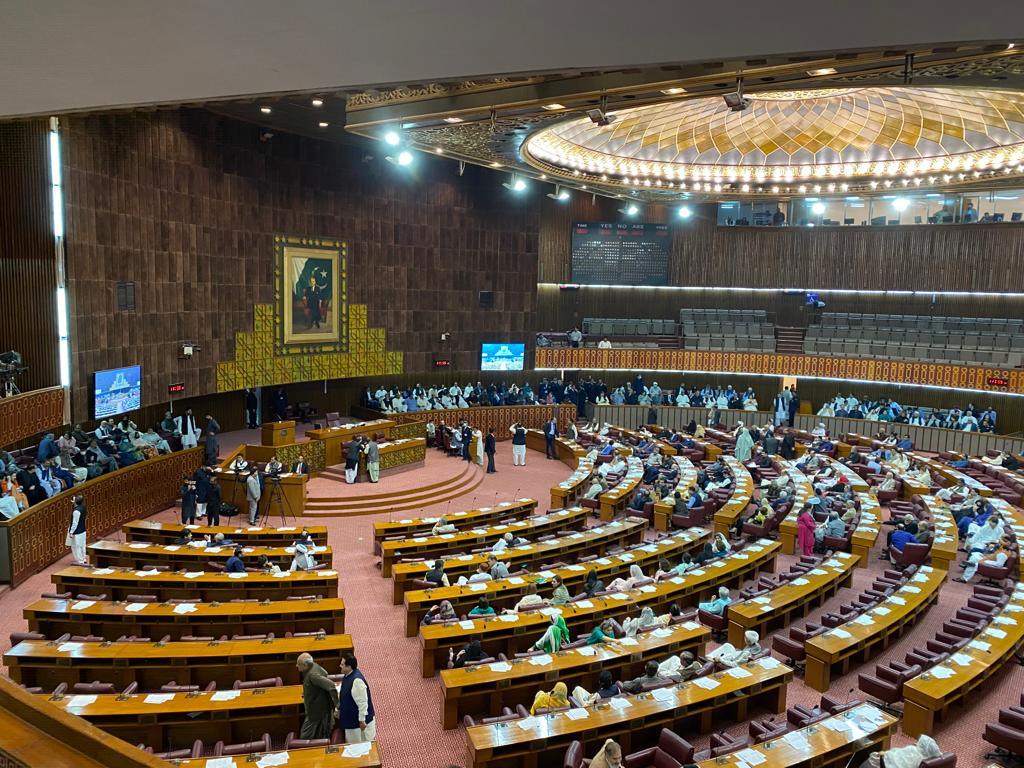

Overview
- Legislative body: National Assembly of Pakistan
- Jurisdiction: Pakistan
- Meeting place: Parliament House, Islamabad
- Term: 20 March 1985 – 29 May 1988
- Election: 1985 Pakistani general election
- Government: Muhammad Khan Junejo
- Website: Official website

National Assembly of Pakistan
- Members: 237
- Speaker: Syed Fakhar Imam; Hamid Nasir Chattha
- Prime Minister: Muhammad Khan Junejo
- Leader of the Opposition: Muhammad Saifullah Khan; Syed Fakhar Imam
- President: Muhammad Zia-ul-Haq

Composition
Category	Seats
General seats	207
Reserved seats for women	20
Reserved seats for minorities	10
Total	237

The 7th National Assembly of Pakistan was the legislature of Pakistan formed after the 1985 Pakistani general election, which was held on a non-party basis during the military rule of General Zia-ul-Haq. The Assembly was the lower house of the bicameral Majlis-e-Shura and had a total strength of 237 members: 207 general seats, 20 reserved seats for women, and 10 seats for minorities.

The first session of the Assembly was held on 20 March 1985. Muhammad Khan Junejo was nominated prime minister by President Zia-ul-Haq and received a vote of confidence on 24 March 1985. Syed Fakhar Imam served as Speaker from 22 March 1985 to 26 May 1986, and Hamid Nasir Chattha succeeded him on 31 May 1986. Wazir Ahmed Jogezai served as Deputy Speaker throughout the Assembly's tenure. The official list of opposition leaders records Muhammad Saifullah Khan from 23 March 1985 to 19 March 1987, followed by Syed Fakhar Imam from 3 May 1987 until the dissolution of the Assembly.

During its tenure, the Assembly passed the Eighth Amendment in November 1985, which inserted Article 58(2)(b) and expanded presidential power to dissolve the National Assembly. President Zia-ul-Haq used that power to dissolve the Assembly on 29 May 1988.

== General seats ==
This is a list of members of the National Assembly elected on general seat members.

Region	Constituency	Member	Ref.
North-West Frontier Province	NA-1 (Peshawar-I)	Haji Mohammad Unis Elahi	
North-West Frontier Province	NA-2 (Peshawar-II)	Mohammad Saalem Khan Khalil	
North-West Frontier Province	NA-3 (Peshawar-III)	Hameed Khan	
North-West Frontier Province	NA-4 (Peshawar-IV)	Nisar Mohammad Khan	
North-West Frontier Province	NA-5 (Peshawar-V)	Maulana Abdul Haq	
North-West Frontier Province	NA-6 (Mardan-I)	Haji Mohammad Yaqoob	
North-West Frontier Province	NA-7 (Mardan-II)	Moulana Gauhar Rehman	
North-West Frontier Province	NA-8 (Mardan-III)	Fazal Dad Khan	
North-West Frontier Province	NA-9 (Mardan-IV)	Yaqub Khan Jadoon	
North-West Frontier Province	NA-10 (Kohat)	Haji Nadar Shah	
North-West Frontier Province	NA-11 (Kohat-cum-Karak)	Mohammad Aslam Khan Khattak	
North-West Frontier Province	NA-12 (Abbottabad-I)	Malik Abdul Rauf	
North-West Frontier Province	NA-13 (Abbottabad-II)	Haji Javed Iqbal Abbasi	
North-West Frontier Province	NA-14 (Abbottabad-III)	Gohar Ayub Khan	
North-West Frontier Province	NA-15 (Mansehra-I)	Syed Qasim Shah	
North-West Frontier Province	NA-16 (Mansehra-II)	Nawabzada Salahuddin Saeed	
North-West Frontier Province	NA-17 (Mansehra-cum-Kohistan)	Mohammad Ayub Khan	
North-West Frontier Province	NA-18 (D.I. Khan)	Pir Mohammad Sabir Shah	
North-West Frontier Province	NA-19 (Bannu-I)	—	
North-West Frontier Province	NA-20 (Bannu-II)	Ghulamuddin Khan Marwat	
North-West Frontier Province	NA-21 (Swat-I)	Miangul Aurangzeb	
North-West Frontier Province	NA-22 (Swat-II)	Fazl-e-Raziq	
North-West Frontier Province	NA-23 (Swat-III)	Fateh Mohammad Khan	
North-West Frontier Province	NA-24 (Chitral)	Shahzada Mohiuddin	
North-West Frontier Province	NA-25 (Malakand Protected Area-cum-Dir)	Maulana Mohammad Inayat-ur-Rehman	
North-West Frontier Province	NA-26 (Dir)	Sahibzada Fatehullah	
Federally Administered Tribal Areas	NA-27 (Tribal Area-I)	Malik Fazle Manan Mehmand	
Federally Administered Tribal Areas	NA-28 (Tribal Area-II)	Umer Din Bangash	
Federally Administered Tribal Areas	NA-29 (Tribal Area-III)	Malik Haji Khial Shah	
Federally Administered Tribal Areas	NA-30 (Tribal Area-IV)	Malik Jahangir Khan	
Federally Administered Tribal Areas	NA-31 (Tribal Area-V)	Malik Said Khan Mahsud	
Federally Administered Tribal Areas	NA-32 (Tribal Area-VI)	Abdus Subhan Khan	
Federally Administered Tribal Areas	NA-33 (Tribal Area-VII)	Haji Gul Sher Khan	
Federally Administered Tribal Areas	NA-34 (Tribal Area-VIII)	Noor Sher Khan	
Federal Capital	NA-35 (Federal Capital)	Muhammad Nawaz Khokhar	
Punjab	NA-36 (Rawalpindi-I)	Muhammad Khaqan Abbasi	
Punjab	NA-37 (Rawalpindi-II)	Malik Mahbood Hussain	
Punjab	NA-38 (Rawalpindi-III)	Sheikh Rashid Ahmad	
Punjab	NA-39 (Rawalpindi-IV)	Raja Shahid Zafar	
Punjab	NA-40 (Rawalpindi-V)	Chaudhry Nisar Ali Khan	
Punjab	NA-41 (Attock-I)	Malik Mohammad Aslam	
Punjab	NA-42 (Attock-II)	Sardar Mohammad Sarfraz Khan	
Punjab	NA-43 (Attock-III)	Malik Nur Khan	
Punjab	NA-44 (Jhelum-I)	Raja Mohammad Afzal Khan	
Punjab	NA-45 (Jhelum-II)	Lt. General (Retd.) Malik Abdul Majeed	
Punjab	NA-46 (Jhelum-III)	Raja Mohammad Afsar	
Punjab	NA-47 (Gujrat-I)	Nawabzada Mazhar Ali	
Punjab	NA-48 (Gujrat-II)	Chaudhry Shujaat Hussain	
Punjab	NA-49 (Gujrat-III)	Syed Manzoor Hussain	
Punjab	NA-50 (Gujrat-IV)	Chaudhry Muhammad Iqbal	
Punjab	NA-51 (Gujrat-V)	Chaudhry Mumtaz Ahmad Tarar	
Punjab	NA-52 (Gujrat-VI)	Chaudhry Muhammad Nawaz Bosal	
Punjab	NA-53 (Khushab-I)	Malik Naseem Ahmed Aheer	
Punjab	NA-54 (Khushab-II)	Malik Muhammad Naeem Khan	
Punjab	NA-55 (Sargodha-I)	Syed Nusrat Ali Shah	
Punjab	NA-56 (Sargodha-II)	Malik Muhammad Aslam Katcheela	
Punjab	NA-57 (Sargodha-III)	Anwar Ali Cheema	
Punjab	NA-58 (Sargodha-IV)	Chaudhry Amanullah Badhrana	
Punjab	NA-59 (Sargodha-V)	Malik Nur Hayat Khan Noon	
Punjab	NA-60 (Mianwali)	Maqbool Ahmad Khan	
Punjab	NA-61 (Mianwali-cum-Bhakkar)	Dr. Sher Afgan Khan Niazi	
Punjab	NA-62 (Bhakkar)	Amanullah Khan Shahani	
Punjab	NA-63 (Jhang-I)	Sardarzada Muhammad Ali Shah	
Punjab	NA-64 (Jhang-II)	Maulana Muhammad Rehmatullah	
Punjab	NA-65 (Jhang-III)	Nawab Amanullah Khan	
Punjab	NA-66 (Jhang-IV)	Syeda Abida Hussain	
Punjab	NA-67 (Jhang-V)	Khan Muhammad Arif Khan	
Punjab	NA-68 (Faisalabad-I)	Muhammad Anwar Ali Khan	
Punjab	NA-69 (Faisalabad-II)	Raja Nadir Pervaiz Khan	
Punjab	NA-70 (Faisalabad-III)	Muhammad Akram Ansari	
Punjab	NA-71 (Faisalabad-IV)	Chaudhry Muhammad Nazir Ahmad	
Punjab	NA-72 (Faisalabad-V)	Rai Salahuddin Khan	
Punjab	NA-73 (Faisalabad-VI)	Dr. Muhammad Shafiq	
Punjab	NA-74 (Faisalabad-VII)	Chaudhry Muhammad Bashir Randhawa	
Punjab	NA-75 (Faisalabad-VIII)	Rai Arif Hussain	
Punjab	NA-76 (Faisalabad-IX)	Muhammad Abdullah Ghazi	
Punjab	NA-77 (Faisalabad-X)	Mian Nasir Ali Khan Baluch	
Punjab	NA-78 (Toba Tek Singh-I)	Makhdoom Syed Ali Raza Shah	
Punjab	NA-79 (Toba Tek Singh-II)	Chaudhry Abdul Sattar	
Punjab	NA-80 (Toba Tek Singh-III)	Hamza	
Punjab	NA-81 (Lahore-I)	Pir Muhammad Ashraf	
Punjab	NA-82 (Lahore-II)	Iqbal Ahmad Khan	
Punjab	NA-83 (Lahore-III)	Rohail Asghar	
Punjab	NA-84 (Lahore-IV)	Liaqat Baloch	
Punjab	NA-85 (Lahore-V)	Mian Muhammad Asif	
Punjab	NA-86 (Lahore-VI)	Syed Asad Gillani	
Punjab	NA-87 (Lahore-VII)	Hafiz Salman Butt	
Punjab	NA-88 (Lahore-VIII)	Haji Muhammad Asghar	
Punjab	NA-89 (Kasur-I)	Sardar Aseff Ahmad Ali	
Punjab	NA-90 (Kasur-II)	Rao Muhammad Khizar Hayat	
Punjab	NA-91 (Kasur-III)	Sardar Abdul Hamid	
Punjab	NA-92 (Kasur-IV)	Maulana Moeen-ud-din Lakhvi	
Punjab	NA-93 (Sheikhupura-I)	Rana Tanveer Hussain	
Punjab	NA-94 (Sheikhupura-II)	Mian Abdul Raouf	
Punjab	NA-95 (Sheikhupura-III)	Mian Shamim Haider	
Punjab	NA-96 (Sheikhupura-IV)	Malik Sarfraz Ahmad	
Punjab	NA-97 (Sheikhupura-V)	Rai Mansab Ali Khan	
Punjab	NA-98 (Gujranwala-I)	Hamid Nasir Chattha (Speaker, National Assembly)	
Punjab	NA-99 (Gujranwala-II)	Brig. (Retd.) Iftikhar-i-Bashir	
Punjab	NA-100 (Gujranwala-III)	Sheikh Muhammad Mansoor	
Punjab	NA-101 (Gujranwala-IV)	Brig. (Retd.) Muhammad Asghar	
Punjab	NA-102 (Gujranwala-V)	Rana Nazir Ahmad Khan	
Punjab	NA-103 (Gujranwala-VI)	Chaudhry Ijaz Ahmad	
Punjab	NA-104 (Sialkot-I)	Khawaja Muhammad Safdar	
Punjab	NA-105 (Sialkot-II)	Chaudhry Amir Hussain	
Punjab	NA-106 (Sialkot-III)	Muhammad Akram Khan	
Punjab	NA-107 (Sialkot-IV)	Sahibzada Prof. Muhammad Ahmad	
Punjab	NA-108 (Sialkot-V)	Chaudhry Muhammad Sarwar Khan	
Punjab	NA-109 (Sialkot-VI)	Chaudhry Shafaat Ahmad Khan	
Punjab	NA-110 (Sialkot-VII)	Anwar Aziz Chaudhri	
Punjab	NA-111 (Multan-I)	Syed Fakhar Imam (Speaker, National Assembly)	
Punjab	NA-112 (Multan-II)	Qamaruz Zaman Shah Khagga	
Punjab	NA-113 (Multan-III)	Pir Muhammad Sanaullah Bodla	
Punjab	NA-114 (Multan-IV)	Javed Hashmi	
Punjab	NA-115 (Multan-V)	Makhdumzada Syed Hamid Raza Gilani	
Punjab	NA-116 (Multan-VI)	Feroz-ud-din Ansari	
Punjab	NA-117 (Multan-VII)	Shaikh Muhammad Rashid	
Punjab	NA-118 (Multan-VIII)	Muhammad Siddiq Khan Kanju	
Punjab	NA-119 (Multan-IX)	Syed Yousaf Raza Gillani	
Punjab	NA-120 (Multan-X)	Rana Shaukat Hayat Noon	
Punjab	NA-121 (Vehari-I)	Muhammad Nawaz Khan alias Dilawar Khan Khichi	
Punjab	NA-122 (Vehari-II)	Mian Riaz Ahmad Khan Daultana	
Punjab	NA-123 (Vehari-III)	Syed Shahid Mehdi Naseem	
Punjab	NA-124 (D.G. Khan-I)	Khawaja Ghulam Moeenuddin	
Punjab	NA-125 (D.G. Khan-II)	Sardar Maqsood Ahmad Khan Laghari	
Punjab	NA-126 (Rajanpur)	Mir Balakh Sher Khan Mazari	
Punjab	NA-127 (Muzaffargarh-I)	Dr. Mian Zulfiqar Ali Barq	
Punjab	NA-128 (Muzaffargarh-II)	Malik Ghulam Muhammad Mujtaba Ghazi Khar	
Punjab	NA-129 (Muzaffargarh-III)	Malik Ghulam Muhammad Murtaza Khar	
Punjab	NA-130 (Leiah-I)	Ghulam Farid Khan Mirani	
Punjab	NA-131 (Leiah-II)	Sardar Muhammad Jahangir Khan	
Punjab	NA-132 (Sahiwal-I)	Muhammad Rafiq Safdar	
Punjab	NA-133 (Sahiwal-II)	Rana Naeem Mahmud Khan	
Punjab	NA-134 (Sahiwal-III)	Rai Ahmad Nawaz	
Punjab	NA-135 (Sahiwal-IV)	Mian Ghulam Muhammad Ahmad Khan Maneka	
Punjab	NA-136 (Sahiwal-V)	Raja Shahid Saeed Khan	
Punjab	NA-137 (Okara-I)	Mian Muhammad Zaman	
Punjab	NA-138 (Okara-II)	Syed Sajjad Haider	
Punjab	NA-139 (Okara-III)	Mian Muhammad Yasin Khan Wattoo	
Punjab	NA-140 (Bahawalpur-I)	Shahzada Saeed-ur-Rashid Mahmood Abbasi	
Punjab	NA-141 (Bahawalpur-II)	Chaudhry Mumtaz Ahmed Jajja	
Punjab	NA-142 (Bahawalpur-III)	Syed Tasneem Nawaz Gardezi	
Punjab	NA-143 (Bahawalpur-cum-Bahawalnagar)	Sahibzada Noor Hassan	
Punjab	NA-144 (Bahawalnagar-I)	Syed Muhammad Ahmed Shah	
Punjab	NA-145 (Bahawalnagar-II)	Mian Abdul Sattar Laleka	
Punjab	NA-146 (Bahawalnagar-III)	Begum Nasim Majid	
Punjab	NA-147 (Rahimyar Khan-I)	Syed Ahmed Alam Anwar	
Punjab	NA-148 (Rahimyar Khan-II)	Haji Muhammad Saifullah Khan	
Punjab	NA-149 (Rahimyar Khan-III)	Makhdum Imad-ud-Din Qureshi	
Punjab	NA-150 (Rahimyar Khan-IV)	Sardar Rais Shabbir Ahmad Khan	
Sindh	NA-151 (Sukkur-I)	Islamuddin Shaikh	
Sindh	NA-152 (Sukkur-II)	Sardar Ghulam Muhammad Khan Mahar	
Sindh	NA-153 (Sukkur-III)	Sardar Haji Noor Muhammad Khan Lund	
Sindh	NA-154 (Shikarpur-I)	Illahi Bakhsh Soomro	
Sindh	NA-155 (Shikarpur-II)	Agha Atta Muhammad Khan	
Sindh	NA-156 (Jacobabad-I)	Mir Mehran Khan Bijarani	
Sindh	NA-157 (Jacobabad-II)	Rahim Bukhsh Soomro	
Sindh	NA-158 (Nawabshah-I)	Syed Zafar Ali Shah	
Sindh	NA-159 (Nawabshah-II)	Dil Murad Jamali	
Sindh	NA-160 (Nawabshah-III)	Syed Ali Asghar Shah	
Sindh	NA-161 (Nawabshah-IV)	Syed Bashir Ahmad Shah	
Sindh	NA-162 (Khairpur-I)	Syed Ali Gohar Shah	
Sindh	NA-163 (Khairpur-II)	Syed Abdul Razak Shah	
Sindh	NA-164 (Larkana-I)	Shah Muhammad Pasha Khuhro	
Sindh	NA-165 (Larkana-II)	Sardar Ahmad Sultan Chandio	
Sindh	NA-166 (Larkana-III)	Mir Nadir Ali Khan Magsi	
Sindh	NA-167 (Hyderabad-I)	Shahabuddin Shah Hussainy	
Sindh	NA-168 (Hyderabad-II)	Wasi Mazhar Nadvi	
Sindh	NA-169 (Hyderabad-III)	Nawab Muhammad Yamin Khan	
Sindh	NA-170 (Hyderabad-IV)	Mir Inayat Ali Talpur	
Sindh	NA-171 (Hyderabad-V)	Kazi Abdul Majid Abid	
Sindh	NA-172 (Badin-I)	Haji Abdullah Halepoto	
Sindh	NA-173 (Badin-II)	Bashir Ahmad Halepoto	
Sindh	NA-174 (Tharparkar-I)	Major General (Retd.) Muhammad Bashir Khan	
Sindh	NA-175 (Tharparkar-II)	Khair Muhammad Bhurghari	
Sindh	NA-176 (Tharparkar-III)	Arbab Amir Hassan	
Sindh	NA-177 (Dadu-I)	Pir Bux Khaskheli	
Sindh	NA-178 (Dadu-II)	Haji Khair Muhammad Penhwar	
Sindh	NA-179 (Dadu-III)	Abdul Hameed Jatoi	
Sindh	NA-180 (Sanghar-I)	Muhammad Khan Junejo (Prime Minister of Pakistan)	
Sindh	NA-181 (Sanghar-II)	Atta Muhammad Marri	
Sindh	NA-182 (Thatta-I)	Haji Muhammad Usman Khan Jalbani	
Sindh	NA-183 (Thatta-II)	Ahmed Memon	
Sindh	NA-184 (Karachi West-I)	Mir Nawaz Khan Karwat	
Sindh	NA-185 (Karachi West-II)	Shah Baleeghuddin	
Sindh	NA-186 (Karachi West-III)	Muzaffar Ahmad Hashmi	
Sindh	NA-187 (Karachi West-IV)	Muhammad Usman Ramz	
Sindh	NA-188 (Karachi West-V)	Muhammad Afaque Khan	
Sindh	NA-189 (Karachi South-I)	Ghulam Muhammad Chishti	
Sindh	NA-190 (Karachi South-II)	Maulana Syed Shah Turabul-Haq Qadri	
Sindh	NA-191 (Karachi South-III)	Shaikh Abdul Khaliq Allahwala	
Sindh	NA-192 (Karachi East-I)	Haji Muhammad Hanif Tayyab	
Sindh	NA-193 (Karachi East-II)	Kanwar Qutbuddin Khan	
Sindh	NA-194 (Karachi East-III)	Muhammad Usman Khan Noori	
Sindh	NA-195 (Karachi East-IV)	Zain Noorani	
Sindh	NA-196 (Karachi East-V)	Allama Abdul Mustafa Al-Azhari	
Balochistan	NA-197 (Quetta-cum-Chagai)	Haji Sardar Fateh Muhammad M. Hassani	
Balochistan	NA-198 (Pishin)	Muhammad Qasim Khan	
Balochistan	NA-199 (Loralai)	Mir Haji Tareen	
Balochistan	NA-200 (Zhob)	Sardar Wazir Ahmad Jogezai (Deputy Speaker, National Assembly)	
Balochistan	NA-201 (Kachhi)	Sardar Taj Muhammad Rind	
Balochistan	NA-202 (Sibbi-cum-Kohlu-cum-Dera Bugti)	Mir Ahmad Nawaz Bugti	
Balochistan	NA-203 (Nasirabad)	Mir Zafarullah Khan Jamali	
Balochistan	NA-204 (Kalat-cum-Kharan)	Prince Mohyuddin Baluch	
Balochistan	NA-205 (Khuzdar)	Mir Muhammad Arif Jan Muhammad Hassani	
Balochistan	NA-206 (Lasbela-cum-Gwadar)	Shahzada Jam Muhammad Yousaf	
Balochistan	NA-207 (Turbat-cum-Panjgur)	Maulana Abdul Haque Baluch	

== Women members ==
Two women were elected on general seats, 18 were returned on women's reserved seats, two represented Balochistan on women's seats, and one woman, Lila Wanti, entered the House on a minority seat.

=== Elected on general seats ===
Member	Constituency / constituencies won	Ref.
Abida Hussain	NA-76 (Faisalabad-IX / later Jhang-IV)	
Begum Nasim Majid Akhtar	NA-146 (Bahawalnagar-V, by-election)	

=== Reserved seats for women ===
Region	Member	Ref.
Punjab	Sahibzadi Mehmooda Begum	
Punjab	Mrs. Nisar Fatima Zahra	
Punjab	Begum Afsar Raza Qizilbash	
Punjab	Begum Sarwari Sadiq	
Punjab	Begum Silvat Sher Ali Khan Pataudi	
Punjab	Mrs. Ishrat Ashraf	
Punjab	Mrs. Khurshid Begum	
Punjab	Mrs. Rehana Aleem Mashhadi	
Punjab	Dr. Mrs. Attiya Inayatullah	
Punjab	Mrs. Dureshawar Mazari	
Punjab	Mrs. Rafia Tariq	
Punjab	Mrs. Farrukh Mukhtar	
Sindh	Mrs. Afroze Nazir Ahmad	
Sindh	Mrs. Rashida Pasha Khuhro	
Sindh	Begum Salma Ahmad	
Sindh	Mrs. Qamar-un-Nisa Qamar	
North-West Frontier Province	Mrs. Kulsum Saifullah Khan	
North-West Frontier Province	Mrs. Bilquis Nasr-um-Minallah	
Balochistan	Begum Bilqees Shahbaz	
Balochistan	Dr. Miss Noor Jehan Panezai	

== Non-Muslim members ==
Member	Community	Ref.
N. M. Khokhar	Christian	
Capt. (Retd.) Sanaullah	Christian	
Lt. Col. (Retd.) W. Herbert Baluch	Christian	
Emmanuel Zafar	Christian	
Bhagwandas K. Chawla	Hindu / Scheduled Castes	
Parumal Kolhi	Hindu / Scheduled Castes	
Seth Chiman Das	Hindu / Scheduled Castes	
Guljee	Hindu / Scheduled Castes	
M. P. Bhandara	Parsi / Sikh / Buddhists and others	
Lila Wanti	Minority seat	
