= Mir Nawaz Khan Marwat =

Pakistani politician and lawyer

Member of the National Assembly of Pakistan
- In office 1985–1988
- Constituency: NA-184 (Karachi West-I)

Minister of State for Justice and Parliamentary Affairs
- In office 1986–1986
- President: Muhammad Zia-ul-Haq
- Prime Minister: Muhammad Khan Junejo

Personal details
- Died: 21 September 2017 Karachi, Pakistan
- Occupation: Lawyer

Mir Nawaz Khan Marwat was a Pakistani politician and lawyer. He served as a Minister of State for justice and parliamentary affairs during the government of Prime Minister Muhammad Khan Junejo and was elected to the National Assembly of Pakistan from Karachi in the 1985 Pakistani general election. In later years, he was associated with interfaith organisations including the Religions for Peace network.

== Career ==
Marwat was elected to the National Assembly from Constituency NA-184 (Karachi West-I) in the non-party 1985 general election. He later served as a minister of state for justice and parliamentary affairs.

After retirement from politics, Marwat served as moderator of the Asian Conference on Religion and Peace and international president of the World Conference of Religions for Peace. He also served as a president of Religions for Peace Pakistan.
