= Muhammad Saifullah Khan =

Pakistani politician

10th Leader of the Opposition
- In office 23 March 1985 – 19 March 1987
- President: Muhammad Zia-ul-Haq
- Prime Minister: Muhammad Khan Junejo

Federal Minister for Religious Affairs and Minorities
- In office 29 March 1987 – 29 May 1988
- Prime Minister: Muhammad Khan Junejo

Personal details
- Born: 1930 Allah Abad, Punjab, British India
- Died: 2014 (aged 83–84) Rahim Yar Khan, Pakistan
- Party: Independent (1985–2001); Pakistan Peoples Party (2002–2014)
- Profession: Lawyer

Muhammad Saifullah Khan (1930–2014), widely known as Haji Saifullah, was a Pakistani politician, lawyer and federal minister. Rising from the rural bar of Liaquatpur, he went on to lead the first organised opposition in the non-party National Assembly of Pakistan elected in 1985. He later served as Federal Minister for Religious Affairs and Minorities from March 1987 until the dismissal of the Junejo government on 29 May 1988.

== Political career ==
Saifullah won the Rahim Yar Khan seat as an independent in the non-party 1985 Pakistani general election, and soon organised like-minded members into the "Independent Parliamentary Group". He served as Leader of the Opposition from March 1985 to March 1987. On 29 March 1987, Prime Minister Muhammad Khan Junejo reshuffled his cabinet and appointed Saifullah federal minister for Religious Affairs and Minorities, where he oversaw Hajj policy, zakat administration and inter-faith liaison until the assembly was dissolved on 29 May 1988. During his tenure, he received visiting dignitaries including Saudi defence minister Sultan bin Abdulaziz and pressed for streamlined pilgrimage logistics.

=== Constitutional litigation ===
After Muhammad Zia-ul-Haq summarily dismissed Junejo, Saifullah challenged the dissolution in the landmark case Federation of Pakistan v. Haji Muhammad Saifullah Khan (PLD 1989 SC 166). The Supreme Court of Pakistan ruled on 5 October 1988 that Zia's dissolution order was unconstitutional but, citing imminent elections, declined to restore the National Assembly.

=== Later politics ===
Saifullah contested NA-192 (Rahim Yar Khan) on a Pakistan Peoples Party ticket in the 2002 general election, though he did not return to parliament. His 1989 precedent continues to be cited by the Election Commission and courts in election-delay and dissolution litigation.

== Personal life ==
Saifullah was born in 1930 in Allah Abad, a market town in what is now Rahim Yar Khan District.

He died in Rahim Yar Khan on 31 May 2014; the National Assembly offered official condolences the following day.
