= Attiya Inayatullah =

Pakistani politician

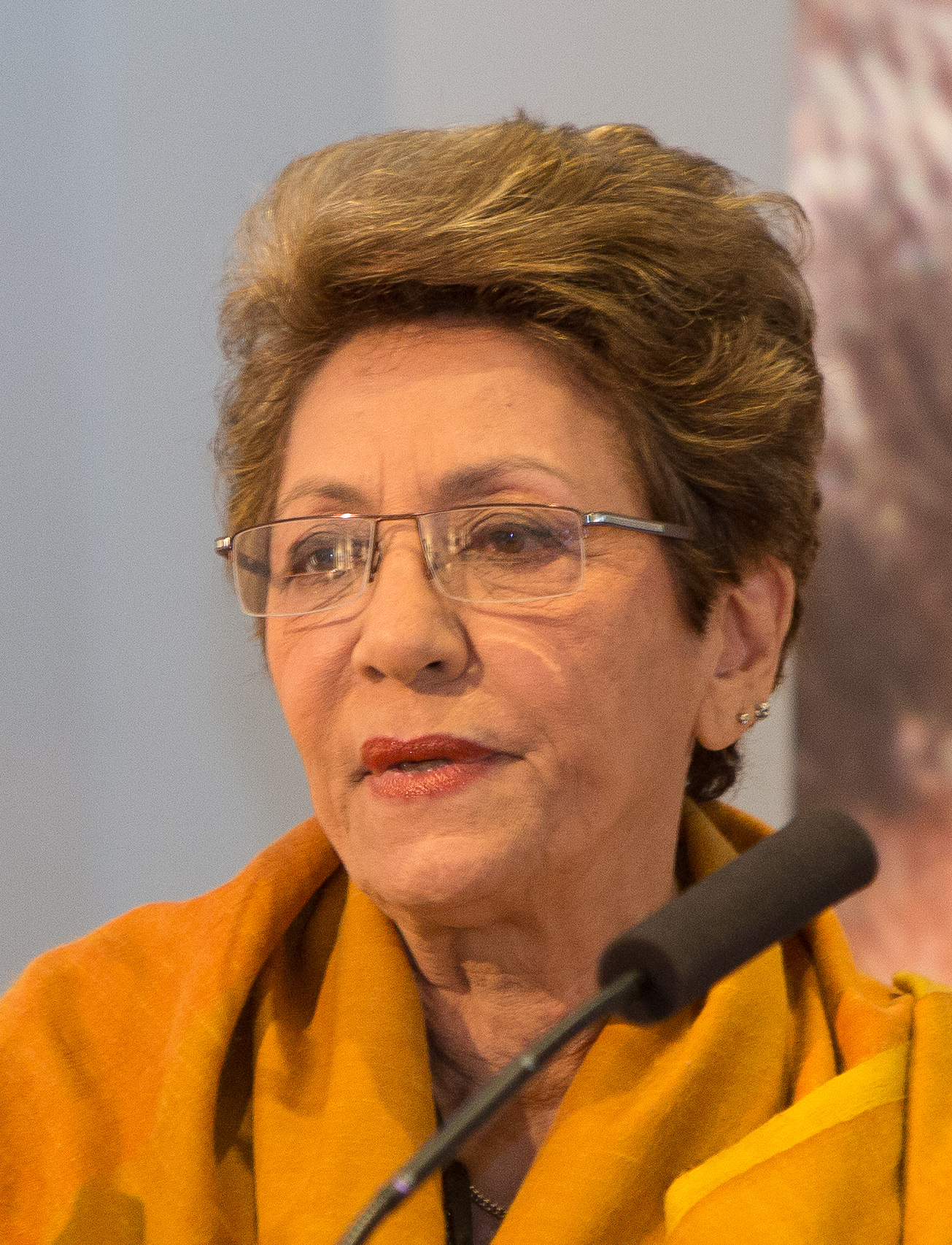

Member of the National Assembly of Pakistan
- In office 17 March 2008 – 16 March 2013
- Constituency: Reserved seat for women
- In office 16 November 2002 – 15 November 2007
- Constituency: Reserved seat for women
- In office 30 November 1988 – 6 August 1990
- Constituency: Reserved seat for women
- In office 20 March 1985 – 29 May 1988
- Constituency: Reserved seat for women

Personal details
- Party: Pakistan Muslim League (Q)

Attiya Inayatullah is a Pakistani politician who had been a member of the National Assembly of Pakistan between 1985 and 2013.

== Early life and education ==
She holds master's degree in Sociology from Boston University and obtained her PhD degree from University of the Punjab.

== Political career ==
Inayatullah served as an adviser on Population Welfare to President of Pakistan Muhammad Zia-ul-Haq in the early 1980s.

She was elected to the National Assembly of Pakistan on reserved seat for women from Punjab in the 1985 Pakistani general election and served as a Minister of State for Population Welfare in the federal cabinet of Prime Minister Muhammad Khan Junejo.

She was re-elected to the National Assembly of Pakistan on reserved seat for women from Punjab in the 1988 Pakistani general election.

Following the 1999 Pakistani coup d'état by Pervez Musharraf, she served as a member of the National Security Council of Pakistan.

She was re-elected to the National Assembly of Pakistan as a candidate of Pakistan Muslim League (Q) on a seat reserved for women from Punjab in the 2002 Pakistani general election.

She was re-elected to the National Assembly of Pakistan as a candidate of Pakistan Muslim League (Q) on a seat reserved for women from Punjab in the 2008 Pakistani general election.
