= List of South American subnational entities by Human Development Index =

Map of subnational regions categorized by Human Development Index (HDI) values, based on 2023 data (published in March 2026). ≥0.800 0.700 – 0.799 0.550 – 0.699 <0.550

The following list shows the subnational entities and regions of South America included in the Human Development Index (HDI) report, sorted by their score. The HDI is a summary measure of human development that considers three dimensions: health, education, and standard of living. It is calculated by taking the geometric mean of three normalized indicators: life expectancy at birth, mean and expected years of schooling, and gross national income per capita. The HDI ranges from 0 to 1, with higher values indicating higher human development. The HDI itself was created by Pakistani economist Mahbub ul Haq in 1990, and was further used by the UNDP to measure a country's development in its annual Human Development Reports.

The index was initially calculated at the country level. The Global Data Lab at Radboud University in the Netherlands launched a subnational HDI (SHDI) in 2018, which covers around 1,800 regions in over 160 countries to better reflect the differences within countries. Global Data Lab also provides the Subnational Gender Development Index (SGDI) and data on income, years of education, and life expectancy on the subnational level. The SHDI and SGDI are based on the UNDP's official HDI and GDI, but they use subnational data in addition to national data.

== List ==
Based on the Human Development Index report, as compiled by the United Nations Development Programme (UNDP).

Note: The scores here are from the most recent HDI report as of March 26, 2026, which used country data from 2023 to calculate the scores.

Rank	Region	Country	National HDI	National rank	Subnational HDI
Very high human development
1	Region Metropolitana	Chile	0.910	1	0.938
2	Tarapaca (including Arica and Parinacota)	Chile	0.910	2	0.933
3	Valparaiso	Chile	0.910	3	0.926
4	Antofagasta	Chile	0.910	4	0.924
5	Magallanes and La Antartica Chilena	Chile	0.910	5	0.923
6	Montevideo and metropolitan area	Uruguay	0.906	1	0.915
7	Atacama	Chile	0.910	6	0.914
8	Patagonia	Argentina	0.905	1	0.909
9	Cuyo	Argentina	0.905	2	0.907
10	NOA	Argentina	0.905	3	0.906
11	Costa Este (Canelones, Maldonado, and Rocha)	Uruguay	0.906	2	0.906
12	Pampeana	Argentina	0.905	4	0.905
13	Gran Buenos Aires	Argentina	0.905	5	0.904
14	NEA	Argentina	0.905	6	0.896
15	Distrito Federal	Brazil	0.839	1	0.893
16	Centro Sur (Flores, Florida, and Lavalleja)	Uruguay	0.906	3	0.89
17	Coquimbo	Chile	0.910	7	0.887
18	West (Ancash, Lima, Callao)	Peru	0.820	1	0.884
19	Bio Bio	Chile	0.910	8	0.882
20	OHiggins	Chile	0.910	9	0.877
21	Centro (Durazno and Tacuarembo)	Uruguay	0.906	4	0.876
22	Rio de Janeiro	Brazil	0.839	2	0.875
23	Bogota D.C.	Colombia	0.823	1	0.875
24	Sao Paulo	Brazil	0.839	3	0.872
25	Litoral Sur (Soriano, Colonia, and San Jose)	Uruguay	0.906	5	0.869
26	Norte (Artigas, Rivera, Cerro Largo, and Trienta y Tres)	Uruguay	0.906	6	0.868
27	Aisen	Chile	0.910	10	0.863
28	Litoral Norte (Paysandu, Salto, and Rio Negro)	Uruguay	0.906	7	0.863
29	Santa Catarina	Brazil	0.839	4	0.858
30	Rio Grande do Sul	Brazil	0.839	5	0.857
31	San Andres	Colombia	0.823	2	0.852
32	Parana	Brazil	0.839	6	0.85
33	Los Lagos (incl Los Rios)	Chile	0.910	11	0.85
34	Valle (incl Cali)	Colombia	0.823	3	0.85
35	Goias	Brazil	0.839	7	0.846
36	Atlantico (incl Barranquilla)	Colombia	0.823	4	0.846
37	Maule	Chile	0.910	12	0.845
38	Espirito Santo	Brazil	0.839	8	0.843
39	Mato Grosso do Sul	Brazil	0.839	9	0.843
40	South (Tacna, Moquegua, Arequipa, Ica, Ayacucho)	Peru	0.820	2	0.842
41	Roraima	Brazil	0.839	10	0.841
42	Arbucania	Chile	0.910	13	0.841
43	Quindio	Colombia	0.823	5	0.84
44	Upper Demerara-Berbice	Guyana	0.804	1	0.84
45	Minas Gerais	Brazil	0.839	11	0.838
46	Mato Grosso	Brazil	0.839	12	0.835
47	Meta	Colombia	0.823	6	0.835
48	Caldas	Colombia	0.823	7	0.834
49	Santander	Colombia	0.823	8	0.833
50	Central (Asuncion, Central)	Paraguay	0.788	1	0.832
51	Cundinamarca	Colombia	0.823	9	0.83
52	Sierra	Ecuador	0.816	1	0.83
53	Amapa	Brazil	0.839	13	0.828
54	Antioquia (incl Medellin)	Colombia	0.823	10	0.828
55	Rio Grande do Norte	Brazil	0.839	14	0.825
56	Demerara-Mahaica	Guyana	0.804	2	0.825
57	Tocantins	Brazil	0.839	15	0.824
58	Sergipe	Brazil	0.839	16	0.818
59	Risaralda	Colombia	0.823	11	0.815
60	Coste	Ecuador	0.816	2	0.814
61	Amazonas	Brazil	0.839	17	0.813
62	Boyaca	Colombia	0.823	12	0.811
63	Bolivar (Sur and Norte)	Colombia	0.823	13	0.81
64	Vichada	Colombia	0.823	14	0.81
65	Pernambuco	Brazil	0.839	18	0.809
66	Santa Cruz	Bolivia	0.764	1	0.808
67	Guaviare	Colombia	0.823	15	0.808
68	Rondonia	Brazil	0.839	19	0.807
69	Bahia	Brazil	0.839	20	0.806
70	Ceara	Brazil	0.839	21	0.805
71	Paraiba	Brazil	0.839	22	0.805
72	Mahaica-Berbice	Guyana	0.804	3	0.805
73	Casanare	Colombia	0.823	16	0.804
74	Norte de Santander	Colombia	0.823	17	0.802
High human development
75	Tolima	Colombia	0.823	18	0.798
76	Sucre	Colombia	0.823	19	0.795
77	Essequibo Islands-West Demerara	Guyana	0.804	4	0.795
78	Arauca	Colombia	0.823	20	0.793
79	East Berbice-Corentyne	Guyana	0.804	5	0.792
80	Tarija	Bolivia	0.764	2	0.791
81	Para	Brazil	0.839	23	0.79
82	Acre	Brazil	0.839	24	0.787
83	Alagoas	Brazil	0.839	25	0.785
84	North (Tumbes, Piura, Lambayeque, Cajamarca, La Libertad)	Peru	0.820	3	0.785
85	Cesar	Colombia	0.823	21	0.781
86	Piaui	Brazil	0.839	26	0.78
87	Oriente	Ecuador	0.816	3	0.778
88	Magdalena	Colombia	0.823	22	0.777
89	Huila	Colombia	0.823	23	0.776
90	Oruro	Bolivia	0.764	3	0.775
91	South-East (Guaira, Misiones, Paraguari, Neembucu)	Paraguay	0.788	2	0.773
92	Maranhao	Brazil	0.839	27	0.771
93	Amazonas	Colombia	0.823	24	0.771
94	Narino	Colombia	0.823	25	0.771
95	Central (Huancavelica, Huanuco, Junin, Pasco)	Peru	0.820	4	0.77
96	Cauca	Colombia	0.823	26	0.768
97	Federal District	Venezuela	0.721	1	0.768
98	Beni	Bolivia	0.764	4	0.767
99	Caqueta	Colombia	0.823	27	0.766
100	Putumayo	Colombia	0.823	28	0.766
101	South-West (Caazapa, Itapua)	Paraguay	0.788	3	0.766
102	La Paz	Bolivia	0.764	5	0.765
103	Cordoba	Colombia	0.823	29	0.765
104	Pomeroon-Supenaam	Guyana	0.804	6	0.764
105	North-East (Caaguazu, Alto Parana, Canideyu)	Paraguay	0.788	4	0.763
106	Pando	Bolivia	0.764	6	0.761
107	North-West (Boqueron, Alto Paraguay, Presidente Hayes, Conception, Amambay, San pedro, Cordillera)	Paraguay	0.788	5	0.758
108	North East (Amazonas, Loreto, San Martin, Ucayali)	Peru	0.820	5	0.756
109	Cochabamba	Bolivia	0.764	7	0.754
110	Miranda	Venezuela	0.721	2	0.754
111	East (Madre de Dios, Cusco, Puno, Apurimac)	Peru	0.820	6	0.752
112	Paramaribo	Suriname	0.731	1	0.751
113	Aragua	Venezuela	0.721	3	0.748
114	Cuyuni-Mazaruni	Guyana	0.804	7	0.747
115	Guajira	Colombia	0.823	30	0.745
116	Choco	Colombia	0.823	31	0.744
117	Carabobo	Venezuela	0.721	4	0.743
118	Chuquisaca	Bolivia	0.764	8	0.742
119	Nueva Esparta	Venezuela	0.721	5	0.742
120	Vargas	Venezuela	0.721	6	0.742
121	Wanica and Para	Suriname	0.731	2	0.738
122	Upper Takutu-Upper Essequibo	Guyana	0.804	8	0.735
123	Anzoategui	Venezuela	0.721	7	0.733
124	Nickerie, Coronie, and Saramacca	Suriname	0.731	3	0.727
125	Bolivar	Venezuela	0.721	8	0.725
126	Barima-Waini	Guyana	0.804	9	0.72
127	Tachira	Venezuela	0.721	9	0.719
128	Potaro-Siparuni	Guyana	0.804	10	0.716
129	Guainja	Colombia	0.823	32	0.715
130	Commewijne and Marowijne	Suriname	0.731	4	0.713
131	Monagas	Venezuela	0.721	10	0.712
132	Falcon	Venezuela	0.721	11	0.711
133	Merida	Venezuela	0.721	12	0.709
134	Zulia	Venezuela	0.721	13	0.707
135	Amacuros Delta Federal Territory	Venezuela	0.721	14	0.706
136	Amazonas Federal Territory	Venezuela	0.721	15	0.701
137	Lara	Venezuela	0.721	16	0.701
Medium human development
138	Cojedes	Venezuela	0.721	17	0.697
139	Sucre	Venezuela	0.721	18	0.69
140	Trujillo	Venezuela	0.721	19	0.689
141	Yaracuy	Venezuela	0.721	20	0.687
142	Potosi	Bolivia	0.764	9	0.684
143	Vaupis	Colombia	0.823	33	0.683
144	Guarico	Venezuela	0.721	21	0.682
145	Barinas	Venezuela	0.721	22	0.666
146	Portuguesa	Venezuela	0.721	23	0.666
147	Apure	Venezuela	0.721	24	0.648
148	Brokopondo and Sipaliwini	Suriname	0.731	5	0.596
