= Mahbub ul Haq =

Pakistani economist (1934–1998)

Mahbub ul-Haq
- محبوب الحق

14th Finance Minister of Pakistan
- In office 9 June 1988 – 1 December 1988
- President: Ghulam Ishaq Khan
- Preceded by: Yasin Wattoo
- Succeeded by: Ehsan-ul-Haq Piracha
- In office 10 April 1985 – 28 January 1986
- President: Zia ul-Haq
- Prime Minister: Muhammad Khan Junejo
- Preceded by: Ghulam Ishaq Khan
- Succeeded by: Yasin Wattoo

Personal details
- Born: 24 February 1934 Gurdaspur, Punjab Province, British India (present-day Punjab, India)
- Died: 16 July 1998 (aged 64) New York City, New York, U.S.
- Spouse: Khadija Khanum
- Children: 2
- Education: University of The Punjab (B.S.); King's College, Cambridge (B.A.); Yale University (Ph.D.)
- Profession: Economist; Politician

Mahbub ul-Haq (Urdu: محبوب الحق; 24 February 1934 – 16 July 1998) was a Pakistani economist, international development theorist, and politician who served as the minister of Finance from 10 April 1985 to 28 January 1986, and again from June to December 1988 as a caretaker. Regarded as one of the greatest economists of his time, Haq devised the Human Development Index, widely used to gauge the development of nations.

After graduating with a degree in economics from the Government College University in Lahore, he won a scholarship to the University of Cambridge in England, where he obtained a second higher degree in the same field. He later received his PhD from Yale University in the United States and conducted postdoctoral research at the Harvard Kennedy School. Haq returned to Pakistan to serve as the chief economist of the Planning Commission throughout the 1960s. In 1970, after the fall of Ayub Khan, Haq moved to Washington, D.C. to serve at the World Bank as Director of Policy Planning until 1982, where he played a major role in reorienting its approach to assisting development in low-income countries.

He returned to Pakistan in 1982, and in 1985 assumed the position of Finance Minister with the Government of Pakistan, and oversaw a period of economic liberalization in the country. In 1989, he moved back to the United States, where he served as the special adviser to the United Nations Development Programme (UNDP) under its head, William Henry Draper III. At the UNDP, Haq led the establishment of the Human Development Report and the widely-respected Human Development Index (HDI), which measures development by well-being, rather than by financial income alone. He returned to Pakistan in 1996 to establish the Human Development Centre in the capital city of Islamabad.

Haq is considered to have had a profound effect on global development. His 1995 book, Reflections on Human Development, is said to have opened new avenues to policy proposals for human development paradigms, such as the United Nations Global Compact that was formed in 2000. Amartya Sen and Tam Dalyell judged Haq's work to have "brought about a major change in the understanding and statistical accounting of the process of development". The Economist called him "one of the visionaries of international development". He was widely regarded as "the most articulate and persuasive spokesman for the developing world".

== Early life and education ==
Haq was born into a Punjabi Muslim family on 24 February 1934 in the city of Gurdaspur, Punjab Province, British India (now located in the Punjab, India). His teenage years saw widespread intercommunal violence and forced migration following the independence of India and Pakistan from British rule in August 1947. He and his family migrated from India to the newly-created state of Pakistan following the partition of India; Haq stated that they narrowly escaped being killed in one of the refugee trains heading to Pakistan. After reaching Lahore, Haq was given government-sponsored housing and decided to continue his education.

In 1953, he graduated with a degree in economics from Lahore's Government College University. He later earned a scholarship to attend Cambridge University, where he earned another BA in the same discipline alongside Indian economist Amartya Sen, with whom he formed a close friendship. After renewing his scholarship, Haq went to United States for his doctoral studies at Yale University and obtained a PhD. Later, Haq carried out postdoctoral work at Harvard University in 1960–61.

== Career ==
An early proponent of economic liberalization who, in later years, argued that poor countries failed to prosper because they neglected the basic development of their people

— New York Times,

Upon returning to Pakistan in 1957 at the age of 23, Haq joined the Planning Commission as Assistant Chief while it prepared its first Five-Year Plan. Influenced by the dominant economic thought in American academia, Haq advocated capitalism as the economic base of the national economy and helped guide the government to apply free-market principles to boost the economy. This approach was wholeheartedly embraced by the military government of General Ayub Khan after it came to power in October 1958. By the 1960s as Chief Economist of the Planning Commission Haq was delivering speeches all over the country in support of these economic policies.

While the international community was applauding Pakistan as a model of development, Haq developed concerns that all was not well with the distribution of the benefits of growth. Rapid economic development made Haq's team doubt the long-term viability of such a pattern of growth, and he increasingly supported heavier taxation of the asset owning classes. In a widely reported speech to the Applied Economics Research Centre at the University of Karachi in April 1968, Haq alleged that "22 industrial family groups had come to dominate the economic and financial life-cycle of Pakistan and that they controlled about two-thirds of industrial assets, 80% of banking and 79% of insurance assets in the industrial domain." The list included Dawood family of Dawood Group, Saigols of Saigol Group, Adamjees of Adamjee Group, Colony, Fancy, Valika, Jalil, Bawany, Crescent, Wazir Ali, Gandhara, Ispahani, House of Habib, Khyber, Nishat Group, Beco, Gul Ahmed Group, Arag, Hafiz, Karim, Milwala and Dada.

These revelations played a major role in mobilising millions in a massive grassroots protest movement that led to Field Marshal Ayub Khan's overthrow in March 1969. Following Ayub's fall, Haq accepted an invitation from Robert McNamara, president of the World Bank to serve as his Director of Policy Planning. During his tenure (1970–82), Haq influenced the Bank's development philosophy and lending policies, steering more attention towards poverty alleviation programmes and increased allocations for small farm production, nutrition, education, water supply and other social sectors. He wrote a study that served as a precursor to the basic needs and human development approaches of the 1980s.

While working at the World Bank, Haq was invited by Prime Minister Zulfiqar Ali Bhutto to join the Ministry of Finance, but ultimately refused as he had strong opposing views on Bhutto's program of nationalization. In 1973 Bhutto again asked Mahbub to return to Pakistan and join his administration in devising a strategy that would lift a large number of Pakistanis out of poverty and stagflation, but their major differences persuaded Haq not to return.

In 1982 Haq returned at the request of General Zia-ul-Haq's military government, where he assumed directorship of the Planning Commission. In 1983 Haq was appointed Minister of Planning and Development. According to Parvez Hasan 'under Mahbub's direction, the Planning Commission became once again a lively place and began to exert powerful influence on social sector issues, including education and family planning, much neglected in earlier Zia years.

In 1985 President Zia oversaw a partial return to democracy with so-called 'non-party' general elections, and Haq was sworn in as Minister of Finance, Planning and Economic Affairs in the PML government of Mohammed Khan Junejo. Haq's is credited with significant tax reforms, deregulation of the economy, increased emphasis on human development and several initiatives for poverty alleviation. Despite this major acceleration in social spending, Haq was forced to resign in January 1986 due to protests regarding his reforms. He was reappointed as Finance Minister in the caretaker administration established by General Zia-ul-Haq after he dismissed the Junejo government in May 1988. Haq's term ended when the PPP government of Benazir Bhutto was sworn in following the general elections of November 1988.

In 1989, he was appointed as Special Advisor to the UNDP Administrator William Draper in New York City to produce the first Human Development Report. In this capacity, Haq initiated the concept of Human Development and the Human Development Report as its Project Director. He led a team of international scholars including Amartya Sen, Paul Streeten, Inge Kaul, Frances Stewart, and Richard Jolly to prepare annual Human Development Reports.

In 1996, Haq founded the Human Development Center in Islamabad, Pakistan — a policy research institute committed to organizing professional research, policy studies and seminars in the area of human development, with a special focus on South Asia. In acknowledgement of his contributions, the Human Development Centre, Islamabad was officially renamed following his death as the Mahbub ul Haq Human Development Centre on 13 December 1998, with Mrs. Khadija Haq as president.

== Death ==
Haq died on 16 July 1998 in New York City at the age of 64, leaving behind his wife Khadija Haq, son Farhan and daughter Toneema.

== Posthumous recognition ==
In honour of Haq, UNDP established the Mahbub ul Haq Award for Outstanding Contribution to Human Development, which is presented to a leading national, regional or world figure who has demonstrated outstanding commitment to furthering human development understanding and progress. The Mahbub ul Haq Award alternates between recognizing political leaders and civil society leaders. Recipients of this Award include:

- 2014 – Gro Harlem Brundtland, former Prime Minister of Norway and a member of The Elders.
- 2009 – Frances Stewart, author, researcher and advocate for human development.
- 2007 – Sheila Watt-Cloutier, arctic community activist.
- 2004 – Fazle Hasan Abed, founder of the Bangladesh Rural Advancement Committee (BRAC).
- 2002 – Fernando Henrique Cardoso, President of Brazil, 1995–2002

== Selected works ==
- The Strategy of Economic Planning (1963)
- The Poverty Curtain: Choices for the Third World (1976). Columbia University Press. 247 pages. ISBN 0-231-04062-8
- The Myth of the Friendly Markets (1992)
- Reflections on Human Development (1996) Oxford University Press. 1st edition (1996): 288 pages, ISBN 0-19-510193-6. 2nd edition (1999): 324 pages, ISBN 0-19-564598-7
- The U.N. and the Bretton Woods Institutions: New Challenges For The Twenty-First Century / Edited By Mahbub Ul Haq ... [Et Al.] (1995)
- The Vision and the Reality (1995)
- The Third World and the international economic order (1976)
- New Imperatives of Human Security (1995)
- A New Framework for Development Cooperation (1995)
- Humanizing Global Institutions (1998)

== Notes ==
Political offices
Preceded by Ghulam Ishaq Khan	Finance Minister of Pakistan; 1985–1986	Succeeded by Mian Yasin Khan Wattoo
Preceded by Mian Yasin Khan Wattoo	Finance Minister of Pakistan (caretaker); 1988	Succeeded by Benazir Bhutto
