= Malik Naseem Ahmed Aheer =

Pakistani politician

Minister of Interior
- In office 28 July 1987 – 17 November 1988
- President: Muhammad Zia-ul-Haq; Ghulam Ishaq Khan
- Prime Minister: Muhammad Khan Junejo
- Preceded by: Wasim Sajjad
- Succeeded by: Aitzaz Ahsan

Personal details
- Born: 8 October 1936 (age 89) Khushab, Punjab, British Raj

Military service
- Allegiance: Pakistan

Malik Naseem Ahmed Aheer is Pakistani politician and former Minister of Interior of Pakistan.

== Early and personal life ==
Aheer was born 8 October 1936 in Khushab. His father's name is Muhammad Malik Khan.

== Career ==
Aheer was Paksistan's Federal Minister of Communications from 1 February to 29 March 1987.

Throughout 1987, he served as the Minister of Education, Communications, Health, Special Education & Social Welfare, and Culture & Tourism, before becoming the Interior Minister from 28 July 1987 to 17 November 1988.

Aheer was also a member of the Ojhri Camp disaster investigating committee.
