= List of members of the 6th National Assembly of Pakistan =

6th National Assembly
←	5th National Assembly	7th National Assembly	→
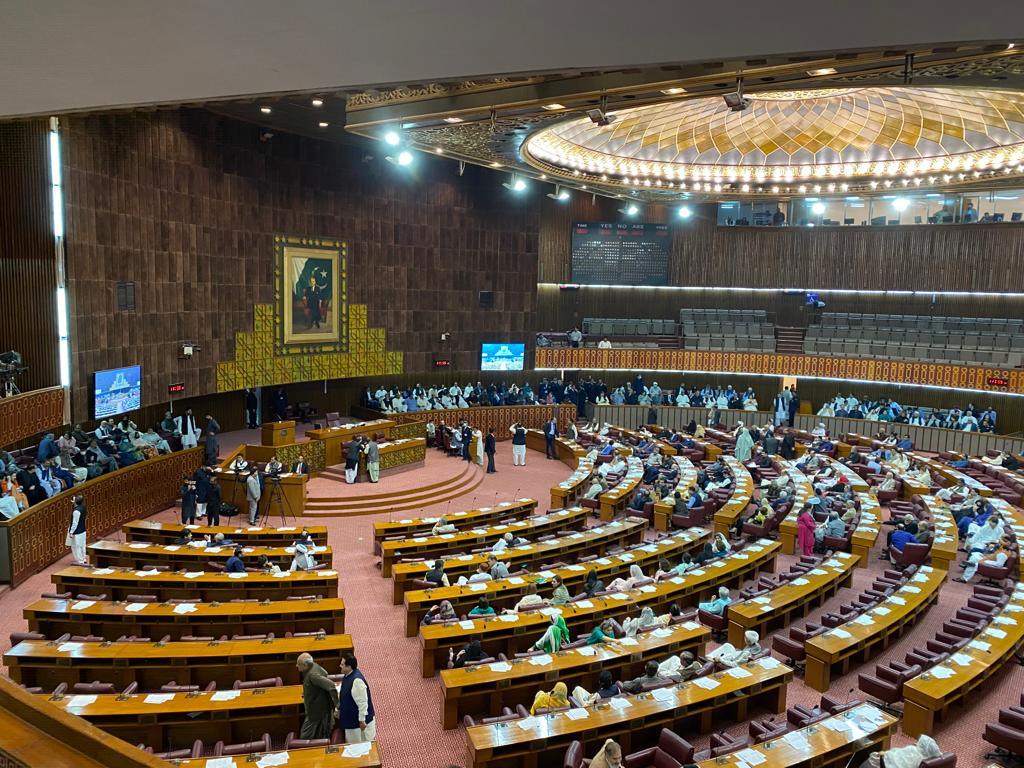

Overview
- Legislative body: National Assembly of Pakistan
- Jurisdiction: Pakistan
- Meeting place: Parliament House, Islamabad-44030
- Term: March 1977 – July 1977
- Election: 1977 Pakistani general election
- Government: Government of Pakistan
- Website: Official website

National Assembly of Pakistan
- Members: 216
- Speaker: Malik Meraj Khalid
- Prime Minister: Zulfikar Ali Bhutto
- President: Fazal Ilahi Chaudhry

6th National Assembly of Pakistan (1977-77)
Party	Seats			
Party	General	Women	Non-Muslims	Total
PPP	155	10	6	171
PNA	36			36
PML(Qayyum)	1			1
IND	8			8
Total	200	10	6	216

The 6th National Assembly of Pakistan was formed after 1977 General elections. There were 216 Members of National Assembly including 10 seats from Women and 6 reserved for Non-Muslims. Due to political unrest in the country after elections, Martial Law was imposed Just 4 months after elections.

== List of members ==
	District	Constituency	Party	Member	Ref
NWFP	Peshawar	NA-1 Peshawar-I	PML(Qayyum)	Yousaf Khattak	
NWFP	Peshawar	NA-2 Peshawar-II	PPP	Arbab Jehangir Khan	
NWFP	Peshawar	NA-3 Peshawar-III	PPP	Aftab Ahmad Khan Sherpao	
NWFP	Peshawar	NA-4 Peshawar-IV	PNA	Begum Naseem Wali Khan	
NWFP	Peshawar	NA-5 Peshawar-V	PNA	Maulana Abdul Haq	
NWFP	Mardan	NA-6 Mardan-I	PPP	Mir Afzal Khan	
NWFP	Mardan	NA-7 Mardan-II	PNA	Mohammad Yousaf Khan	
NWFP	Mardan	NA-8 Mardan-III	PNA	Begum Naseem Wali Khan	
NWFP	Mardan	NA-9 Mardan-IV	PNA	Ali Gohar Khan	
NWFP	Kohat	NA-10 Kohat-I	PNA	Molana Habib Gul	
NWFP	Kohat	NA-11 Kohat-II	PNA	Molvi Naimatullah	
NWFP	Abbottabad	NA-12 Abbottabad-I	PPP	Mohammad Iqbal Khan Jadoon	
NWFP	Abbottabad	NA-13 Abbottabad-II	PNA	Air Marshal (R) Asghar Khan	
NWFP	Abbottabad	NA-14 Abbottabad-III	PNA	Gohar Ayub Khan	
NWFP	Mansehra	NA-15 Mansehra-I	PPP	Mohammad Haneef Khan	
NWFP	Mansehra	NA-16 Mansehra-II	PNA	Fakhr-uz-Zaman Khan	
NWFP	Kohistan	NA-17 Mansehra-cum-Kohistan	PNA	Haji Faqir Mohammad Khan	
NWFP	Dera Ismail Khan	NA-18 Dera Ismail Khan	PNA	Maulana Mufti Mahmood	
NWFP	Bannu	NA-19 Bannu-I	PNA	Molana Sadru Shaheed	
NWFP	Bannu	NA-20 Bannu-II	PNA	Ahmad Jan	
NWFP	Swat	NA-21 Swat-I	PPP	Mian Gul Amirzeb	
NWFP	Swat	NA-22 Swat-II	PNA	Haji Fazl-e-Raziq	
NWFP	Swat	NA-23 Swat-III	PPP	Fateh Mohammad Khan	
NWFP	Chitral	NA-24 Chitral-cum-Swat-cum-Dir	PPP	Moulvi Mohammad Wali Khan	
NWFP	Malakand	NA-25 Malakand-cum-Dir	PNA	Gauhar Rehman	
NWFP	Dir	NA-26 Dir	PNA	Sahabzada Safiullah	
FATA	Mohmand	NA-27 Tribal Area-I	IND	Baroz	
FATA	Kurram	NA-28 Tribal Area-II	IND	Baz Gul	
FATA	Orakzai	NA-29 Tribal Area-III	IND	Shams-ul-Haq	
FATA	North Waziristan	NA-30 Tribal Area-IV	IND	Sardar Habibullah Khan	
FATA	South Waziristan	NA-31 Tribal Area-V	IND	Said Khan	
FATA	Bajaur	NA-32 Tribal Area-VI	IND	Abdus Subhan Khan	
FATA	Khyber	NA-33 Tribal Area-VII	IND	Haji Gul Sher	
FATA	Frontier regions	NA-34 Tribal Area-VIII	IND	Nur Sher Khan	
ICT	Islamabad	NA-35 Islamabad	PPP	Zahoor Ahmad	
Punjab	Rawalpindi	NA-36 Rawalpindi-I	PPP	Col (R) Habib Khan	
Punjab	Rawalpindi	NA-37 Rawalpindi-II	PPP	Abdul Aziz Bhatti	
Punjab	Rawalpindi	NA-38 Rawalpindi-III	PPP	Syed Ali Asghar Shah	
Punjab	Rawalpindi	NA-39 Rawalpindi-IV	PPP	Nazar Hussain Kyan	
Punjab	Rawalpindi	NA-40 Rawalpindi-V	PPP	Abdul Qayyum Butt	
Punjab	Campbellpur	NA-41 Campbellpur-I	PPP	Ahmed Waheed Akhtar	
Punjab	Campbellpur	NA-42 Campbellpur-II	PPP	Sardar Shaukat Hayat	
Punjab	Campbellpur	NA-43 Campbellpur-III	PPP	Pir Syed Safiuddin	
Punjab	Jhelum	NA-44 Jhelum-I	PPP	Dr. Ghulam Hussain	
Punjab	Jhelum	NA-45 Jhelum-II	PPP	Sardar Khizar Hayat Khan	
Punjab	Jhelum	NA-46 Jhelum-III	PPP	Masood-ul-Hassan Bhatti	
Punjab	Gujrat	NA-47 Gujrat-I	PPP	Zafar Mehdi	
Punjab	Gujrat	NA-48 Gujrat-II	PPP	Mian Mushtaq Hussain Pagganwala	
Punjab	Gujrat	NA-49 Gujrat-III	PPP	Atta Elahi Chaudhry	
Punjab	Gujrat	NA-50 Gujrat-IV	PPP	Mohammad Sardar Khan	
Punjab	Gujrat	NA-51 Gujrat-V	PPP	Ch. Ghulam Rasool	
Punjab	Gujrat	NA-52 Gujrat-VI	PPP	Mohammad Gulzar	
Punjab	Sargodha	NA-53 Sargodha-I	PPP	Malik Nasim Ahmad Aheer	
Punjab	Sargodha	NA-54 Sargodha-II	PPP	Malik Karam Bakhsh	
Punjab	Sargodha	NA-55 Sargodha-III	PPP	Mohammad Zakir Qureshi	
Punjab	Sargodha	NA-56 Sargodha-IV	PPP	Mehar Khuda Dad Khan	
Punjab	Sargodha	NA-57 Sargodha-V	PPP	Hafeez Ullah Cheema	
Punjab	Sargodha	NA-58 Sargodha-VI	PPP	Malik Noor Hayat Khan Noon	
Punjab	Sargodha	NA-59 Sargodha-VII	PPP	Malik Anwar Ali Noon	
Punjab	Mianwali	NA-60 Mianwali-I	PPP	Nawabzada Malik Muzaffar Khan	
Punjab	Mianwali	NA-61 Mianwali-II	PPP	Amir Abdullah Khan	
Punjab	Mianwali	NA-62 Mianwali-III	PPP	Ghulam Hussan Khan	
Punjab	Jhang	NA-63 Jhang-I	PPP	Sardarzada Muhammad Ali Shah	
Punjab	Jhang	NA-64 Jhang-II	PPP	Mehr Ghulam Haider	
Punjab	Jhang	NA-65 Jhang-III	PPP	Faisal Saleh Hayat	
Punjab	Jhang	NA-66 Jhang-IV	PPP	Syed Zulfiqar Ali Bokhari	
Punjab	Jhang	NA-67 Jhang-V	PPP	Sahibzada Hazart Mohammad Nazir Sultan Sahib	
Punjab	Lyallpur	NA-68 Lyallpur-I	PPP	Mian Mohammad Attaullah	
Punjab	Lyallpur	NA-69 Lyallpur-II	PNA	Mian Zahid Sarfraz	
Punjab	Lyallpur	NA-70 Lyallpur-III	PPP	Ch. Nisar Akbar	
Punjab	Lyallpur	NA-71 Lyallpur-IV	PPP	Rana Sakhawat Ali Khan	
Punjab	Lyallpur	NA-72 Lyallpur-V	PPP	Ch. Mohammad Anwar Ali Khan	
Punjab	Lyallpur	NA-73 Lyallpur-VI	PPP	Major (R) Moeen-ud-Din	
Punjab	Lyallpur	NA-74 Lyallpur-VII	PPP	Ch.Imtiaz Ahmad Gill	
Punjab	Lyallpur	NA-75 Lyallpur-VIII	PPP	Khan Shahadat Ali Khan	
Punjab	Lyallpur	NA-76 Lyallpur-IX	PPP	Mr.Ghulam Nabi Chaudhry	
Punjab	Lyallpur	NA-77 Lyallpur-X	PPP	Mr. Asad Masood	
Punjab	Lyallpur	NA-78 Lyallpur-XI	PPP	Rai Hafeezullah Khan Tariq	
Punjab	Lyallpur	NA-79 Lyallpur-XII	PPP	Mohammad Bashir Ahmad	
Punjab	Lyallpur	NA-80 Lyallpur-XIII	PPP	Ch. Bashir Ahmad	
Punjab	Lahore	NA-81 Lahore-I	PPP	S.M. Masood	
Punjab	Lahore	NA-82 Lahore-II	PPP	Khalid Latif Kardar	
Punjab	Lahore	NA-83 Lahore-III	PPP	Mian Ehsan-ul-Haq	
Punjab	Lahore	NA-84 Lahore-IV	PPP	Dr. S.M. Yaqub	
Punjab	Lahore	NA-85 Lahore-V	PPP	Mian Salah-ud-Din	
Punjab	Lahore	NA-86 Lahore-VI	PPP	Malik Mohammad Akhtar Khudabakhsh	
Punjab	Lahore	NA-87 Lahore-VII	PPP	Muhammad Rashid	
Punjab	Lahore	NA-88 Lahore-VIII	PPP	Malik Mehraj Khalid	
Punjab	Kasur	NA-89 Kasur-I	PPP	Sardar Ahmad Ali	
Punjab	Kasur	NA-90 Kasur-II	PPP	Major Rehmat Khan	
Punjab	Kasur	NA-91 Kasur-III	PPP	Shafaat Khan	
Punjab	Kasur	NA-92 Kasur-IV	PPP	Amjad Masood	
Punjab	Sheikhupura	NA-93 Sheikhupura-I	PPP	Manzoor Hussain	
Punjab	Sheikhupura	NA-94 Sheikhupura-II	PPP	Malik Mushtaq Ahmad	
Punjab	Sheikhupura	NA-95 Sheikhupura-III	PPP	Mohammad Arif	
Punjab	Sheikhupura	NA-96 Sheikhupura-IV	PPP	Shamim Haider	
Punjab	Sheikhupura	NA-97 Sheikhupural-V	PPP	Rai Rashid Ahmad Khan	
Punjab	Gujranwala	NA-98 Gujranwala-I	PPP	Ghulam Haider Cheema	
Punjab	Gujranwala	NA-99 Gujranwala-II	PPP	Mian Saif Ullah	
Punjab	Gujranwala	NA-100 Gujranwala-III	PNA	Ghulam Dastgir Khan	
Punjab	Gujranwala	NA-101 Gujranwala-IV	PPP	Mian Azhar Hassan	
Punjab	Gujranwala	NA-102 Gujranwala-V	PPP	Malik Mahdi Hassan	
Punjab	Gujranwala	NA-103 Gujranwala-VI	PPP	Mian Shahadat Khan	
Punjab	Sialkot	NA-104 Sialkot-I	PPP	Qazi Zaka-ud-Din	
Punjab	Sialkot	NA-105 Sialkot-II	PPP	Mian Masud Ahmad	
Punjab	Sialkot	NA-106 Sialkot-III	PPP	Ch. Sultan Ahmad	
Punjab	Sialkot	NA-107 Sialkot-IV	PPP	Kausar Naizi	
Punjab	Sialkot	NA-108 Sialkot-V	PPP	Hamid Nawaz Khan	
Punjab	Sialkot	NA-109 Sialkot-VI	PPP	Ghulam Sarwar Khan Advocate	
Punjab	Sialkot	NA-110 Sialkot-VII	PPP	Anwar Aziz Chaudhry	
Punjab	Multan	NA-111 Multan-I	PPP	Syed Abbas Hussain Shah	
Punjab	Multan	NA-112 Multan-II	PPP	Rifat Hayat Khan	
Punjab	Multan	NA-113 Multan-III	PPP	Ch. Barkat Ullah	
Punjab	Multan	NA-114 Multan-IV	PPP	Makhdum Muhammad Sajjad Hussain Qureshi	
Punjab	Multan	NA-115 Multan-V	PPP	Syed Hamid Raza Gilani	
Punjab	Multan	NA-116 Multan-VI	PNA	Sh. Khizar Hayat	
Punjab	Multan	NA-117 Multan-VII	PNA	Maulana Hamid Ali Khan	
Punjab	Multan	NA-118 Multan-VIII	PPP	Ch.Abdul Rehman	
Punjab	Multan	NA-119 Multan-IX	PPP	Nasir Ali Rizvi	
Punjab	Multan	NA-120 Multan-X	PPP	Taj Ahmed	
Punjab	Vehari	NA-121 Vehari-I	PPP	Mohammad Nawaz Khan Alias Dilawar Khan	
Punjab	Vehari	NA-122 Vehari-II	PPP	Alhaj Mian Riaz Ahmad Khan	
Punjab	Vehari	NA-123 Vehari-III	PPP	Agha Saleem Khurshid	
Punjab	D.G.Khan	NA-124 D.G.Khan-I	PNA	Maulana Mufti Mahmood	
Punjab	D.G.Khan	NA-125 D.G.Khan-II	PPP	Sardarr Farooq Ahmad Khan	
Punjab	D.G.Khan	NA-126 D.G.KhanIII	PPP	Mir Balakh Sher Khan Mazari	
Punjab	Muzaffargarh	NA-127 Muzaffargarh-I	PPP	Mohammad Ibrahim	
Punjab	Muzaffargarh	NA-128 Muzaffargarh-II	PNA	Nawabzada Khan	
Punjab	Muzaffargarh	NA-129 Muzaffargarh-III	PNA	Dr. Dost Muhammad Bozdar	
Punjab	Muzaffargarh	NA-130 Muzaffargarh-IV	PPP	Malik Qadir Bakhsh	
Punjab	Muzaffargarh	NA-131 Muzaffargarh-V	PPP	Sardar Mohammad Behram Khan	
Punjab	Sahiwal	NA-132 Sahiwal-I	PPP	Abdul Aleem Sardar	
Punjab	Sahiwal	NA-133 Sahiwal-II	PPP	Sardar Mohammad Naseem	
Punjab	Sahiwal	NA-134 Sahiwal-III	PPP	Ch. Muhammad Hanif Khan	
Punjab	Sahiwal	NA-135 Sahiwal-IV	PPP	Rao Khurshid Ali	
Punjab	Sahiwal	NA-136 Sahiwal-V	PPP	Mohammad Saeed	
Punjab	Sahiwal	NA-137 Sahiwal-VI	PPP	Mian Mohammad Yasin Khan	
Punjab	Sahiwal	NA-138 Sahiwal-VII	PPP	M. Hashim Khan	
Punjab	Sahiwal	NA-139 Sahiwal-VIII	PPP	Ahmad Saeed Khan	
Punjab	Bahawalpur	NA-140 Bahawalpur-I	PPP	Shahzada Saeed-ur-Rashid Abbasi	
Punjab	Bahawalpur	NA-141 Bahawalpur-II	PPP	Shuja Ullah Shaikh	
Punjab	Bahawalpur	NA-142 Bahawalpur-III	PPP	Prince Salahuddin Ahmad Abbasi	
Punjab	Bahawalpur	NA-143 Bahawalpur-cum-Bahawalnagar	PPP	Sahibzada Noor Hassan	
Punjab	Bahawalnagar	NA-144 Bahawalnagar-I	PPP	Rafique Muhammad Shah	
Punjab	Bahawalnagar	NA-145 Bahawalnagar-II	PPP	Mohammad Afzal Wattoo	
Punjab	Bahawalnagar	NA-146 Bahawalnagar-III	PPP	Mohammad Afzal	
Punjab	Rahim Yar Khan	NA-147 Rahim Yar Khan-I	PPP	Khawaja Jamal Muhammad	
Punjab	Rahim Yar Khan	NA-148 Rahim Yar Khan-II	PPP	Makhdoom Hameed-ud-Din	
Punjab	Rahim Yar Khan	NA-149 Rahim Yar Khan-III	PNA	Makhdoom Noor Muhammad Shah	
Punjab	Rahim Yar Khan	NA-150 Rahim Yar Khan-IV	PPP	Bilal Khan Sardar	
Sindh	Sukkur	NA-151 Sukkur-I	PPP	Ali Hassan Mangi	
Sindh	Sukkur	NA-152 Sukkur-II	PPP	Agha Ghulam Nabi	
Sindh	Sukkur	NA-153 Sukkur-III	PPP	Sardar Ghulam Mohammad Khan	
Sindh	Sukkur	NA-154 Sukkur-IV	PPP	Haji Noor Mohammad Khan Lund	
Sindh	Jacobabad	NA-155 Jacobabad-I	PPP	Mir Mehran Khan Bijarani	
Sindh	Jacobabad	NA-156 Jacobabad-II	PPP	Haji Khair Mohammad Khan	
Sindh	Nawabshah	NA-157 Nawabshah-I	PPP	Abdul Fatah	
Sindh	Nawabshah	NA-158 Nawabshah-II	PPP	Ghulam Mujataba	
Sindh	Nawabshah	NA-159 Nawabshah-III	PPP	Syed Shabbir Ahmed Shah	
Sindh	Nawabshah	NA-160 Nawabshah-IV	PPP	Noor Ahmad Shah	
Sindh	Khairpur	NA-161 Khairpur-I	PPP	Syed Qaim Ali Shah	
Sindh	Khairpur	NA-162 Khairpur-II	PPP	Pir Syed Abdul Qadir Shah	
Sindh	Larkana	NA-163 Larkana-I	PPP	Zulfikar Ali Bhutto	
Sindh	Larkana	NA-164 Larkana-II	PPP	Sardar Ahmed Sultan	
Sindh	Larkana	NA-165 Larkana-III	PPP	Mumtaz Ali Bhutto	
Sindh	Hyderabad	NA-166 Hyderabad-I	PPP	Makhdoom Mohammad Zaman	
Sindh	Hyderabad	NA-167 Hyderabad-II	PNA	Maulana Shah Ahmed Noorani	
Sindh	Hyderabad	NA-168 Hyderabad-III	PNA	Mohammad Shaukat	
Sindh	Hyderabad	NA-169 Hyderabad-IV	PPP	Mir Aijaz Ali Khan	
Sindh	Hyderabad	NA-170 Hyderabad-V	PPP	Syed Umed Ali Shah	
Sindh	Badin	NA-171 Badin-I	PPP	Haji Najmuddin Khan	
Sindh	Badin	NA-172 Badin-II	PPP	Haji Abdullah Halepota	
Sindh	Tharparkar	NA-173 Tharparkar-I	PPP	Pir Ghulam Rasool Shah Jillani	
Sindh	Tharparkar	NA-174 Tharparkar-II	PPP	Khadim Ali Shah	
Sindh	Tharparkar	NA-175 Tharparkar-III	PPP	Niaz Muhammad Khan	
Sindh	Dadu	NA-176 Dadu-I	PPP	Malik Sikandar Khan	
Sindh	Dadu	NA-177 Dadu-II	PPP	Rais Allah Khan	
Sindh	Dadu	NA-178 Dadu-III	PPP	Liaquat Ali Khan	
Sindh	Sanghar	NA-179 Sanghar-I	PPP	Haji Fatehuddin Shah	
Sindh	Sanghar	NA-180 Sanghar-II	PPP	Rais Atta Mohammad Maree	
Sindh	Thatta	NA-181 Thatta-I	PPP	Muhammad Khan Soomro	
Sindh	Thatta	NA-182 Thatta-II	PPP	Muhammad Yousif Khan Chandio	
Sindh	Karachi	NA-183 Karachi-I	PNA	Sardar Sher Baz Khan Mazari	
Sindh	Karachi	NA-184 Karachi-II	PNA	Mahmood Azam Farooqi	
Sindh	Karachi	NA-185 Karachi-III	PNA	Mohammad Hassan Haqqani	
Sindh	Karachi	NA-186 Karachi-IV	PNA	Ghafoor Ahmad	
Sindh	Karachi	NA-187 Karachi-V	PNA	Musheer Pesh Imam	
Sindh	Karachi	NA-188 Karachi-VI	PPP	Abdul Sattar Gabol	
Sindh	Karachi	NA-189 Karachi-VII	PNA	Mohammad Hanif Tayyab	
Sindh	Karachi	NA-190 Karachi-VIII	PNA	Air Marshal (R) Asghar Khan	
Sindh	Karachi	NA-191 Karachi-IX	PNA	Syed Munawar Hassan	
Sindh	Karachi	NA-192 Karachi-X	PNA	Shah Faridul Haque	
Sindh	Karachi	NA-193 Karachi-XI	PPP	Abdul Hafeez Pirzada	
Balochistan	Quetta	NA-194 Quetta-I	PPP	Tahir Mohammad Khan	
Balochistan	Quetta	NA-195 Quetta-II	PPP	Yahya Bakhtiar	
Balochistan	Quetta	NA-196 Quetta-III	PPP	Wazir Ahmad	
Balochistan	Sibi	NA-197 Sibi-I	PPP	Mir Taj Mohammad Khan	
Balochistan	Sibi	NA-198 Sibi-II	PPP	Mir Abdul Nabi Jamali	
Balochistan	Kalat	NA-199 Kalat-I	PPP	Mohyuddin	
Balochistan	Kalat	NA-200 Kalat-II	PPP	Mir Amanullah Khan Gichki	

== Elected members for Reserved Seats for Women ==
	Province	Constituency	Party	Member
1	NWFP	NA-201 Women's Constituency-I	Pakistan People's Party	Begum Kalsoom Saifullah
2	Punjab	NA-202 Women's Constituency-II	Pakistan People's Party	Saima Usman Fateh
3	Punjab	NA-203 Women's Constituency-III	Pakistan People's Party	Nafeesa Khalid
4	Punjab	NA-204 Women's Constituency-IV	Pakistan People's Party	Begum Nargis Naeem
5	Punjab	NA-205 Women's Constituency-V	Pakistan People's Party	Dilshad Begum
6	Punjab	NA-206 Women's Constituency-VI	Pakistan People's Party	Mubarak Begum
7	Punjab	NA-207 Women's Constituency-VII	Pakistan People's Party	Begum Bilqis Habibullah
8	Sindh	NA-208 Women's Constituency-VIII	Pakistan People's Party	Begum Nusrat Bhutto
9	Sindh	NA-209 Women's Constituency-IX	Pakistan People's Party	Nasima Sultana Akmut
10	Balochistan	NA-210 Women's Constituency-X	Pakistan People's Party	Begum Bilqis Shehbaz

== Elected members for Reserved Seats for Non-Muslims ==
No	Constituency	Party	Member
1	Reserved Seats for Non-Muslims	Pakistan People's Party	D. P. Singh
2	Reserved Seats for Non-Muslims	Pakistan People's Party	Dr Tulian C. Dean
3	Reserved Seats for Non-Muslims	Pakistan People's Party	Father Derek Misquita
4	Reserved Seats for Non-Muslims	Pakistan People's Party	Rana Chandar Singh
5	Reserved Seats for Non-Muslims	Pakistan People's Party	Dr Stephan P. Lal
6	Reserved Seats for Non-Muslims	Pakistan People's Party	Mrs Gul F. Rustamjee
