= Fiza Junejo =

Pakistani politician

Member of the National Assembly of Pakistan
- In office 2008–2013

Personal details
- Parent: Muhammad Khan Junejo (father)

Fiza Junejo (Urdu: فضا جونیجو) is a Pakistani politician who served as a member of the National Assembly of Pakistan from 2002 to 2013.

== Early life ==
She was born to the former Prime Minister of Pakistan Muhammad Khan Junejo.

== Political career ==
She was elected to the National Assembly of Pakistan as a candidate of Pakistan Muslim League (Q) on a seat reserved for women from Sindh in the 2008 Pakistani general election.
