= Asad Junejo =

Pakistani politician

Senator Asad Ali Junejo

Member of the Senate of Pakistan
- In office 12 March 2018 – 12 March 2024

Personal details
- Party: Pakistan Muslim League (2018-present)
- Parent: Mohammad Khan Junejo (father)

Asad Ali Junejo is a Pakistani politician who has been a Member of the Senate of Pakistan since March 2018.

== Early life and education ==
Junejo was born to former Prime Minister of Pakistan Muhammad Khan Junejo.

He received his education from the St. Patrick's High School, Karachi. One of his daughter Sherina Ghulam Ahmed Junejo passed CSS and selected in PAS group. She served in sindh as Assistant Commissioner and then from 2017 her services given to Punjab and served as ADCR Kasur and now ongoing serving in Faisalabad as Additional Deputy Commissioner (Revenue), Faisalabad.

== Political career ==
In December 2015, Junejo was made President of Pakistan Muslim League (Q) Sindh.

In August 2017, Junejo joined Pakistan Muslim League (N) (PML-N).

Junejo was nominated by PML-N as its candidate in the 2018 Pakistani Senate election. However the Election Commission of Pakistan declared all PML-N candidates for the Senate election as independent after a ruling of the Supreme Court of Pakistan.

Junejo was elected to the Senate of Pakistan as an independent candidate on general seat from Islamabad in the Senate election. He was backed in the election by PML-N and decided to join the treasury benches, led by PML-N after getting elected. He took oath as Senator on 12 March 2018.
