= Leader of the Opposition (Pakistan) =

Parliamentary position in Pakistan

Leader of the Opposition of Pakistan
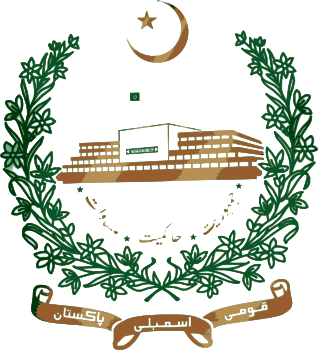
- Incumbent; Mahmood Khan Achakzai since 16 January 2026
- Style: The Honorable (formal); Leader of the Opposition (spoken)
- Member of: National Assembly of Pakistan
- Reports to: Parliament of Pakistan
- Term length: While leader of the largest political party in the National Assembly that is not in government
- Constituting instrument: Constitution of Pakistan
- Formation: 7 July 1955, 63 years ago
- First holder: Kiran Shankar Roy

The leader of the opposition (Urdu: قائد حزب اختلاف) is the people's elected politician who is, by law, the leader of the Official Opposition in Pakistan. The leader of the opposition is the leader of the largest political party in the National Assembly that is not in government. This is usually the leader of the second-largest political party in the National Assembly.

The leader of the opposition is normally viewed as an alternative Prime Minister. There is also a leader of the opposition in the Senate, who is elected / nominated separately by the opposition members of the Senate of Pakistan.

== Powers of the opposition leader ==
The leader of opposition has constitutional authority to consult with the elected prime minister for appointment of a caretaker prime minister. A caretaker prime minister is appointed by the president after consultation with the prime minister and opposition leader.

They have constitutional authority to consult with the prime minister for appointment of the chief election commissioner and members of Election Commission of Pakistan. The president appoints the chief election commissioner and members after consultation with the opposition leader and prime minister.

The chairman of the National Accountability Bureau is appointed after consultation between the prime minister and opposition leader.

They also recommend names of two members of the National Assembly as members of the Judicial Commission of Pakistan from opposition benches for appointment of judges of Supreme Court, High Courts and Federal Shariat Court.

== List ==
The table lists the people who were, or who acted as, leaders of the opposition in Pakistan's national legislature since the independence of the country in 1947.

This comprised the Constituent Assembly from 1947 to 1954, the second Constituent Assembly from 1955 to 1958, and subsequent National Assemblies following the passage of the Constitution of 1973.

Muslim League
Pakistan National Congress
Awami League
Council Muslim League
National Democratic Front
National Awami Party
Awami National Party
Pakistan People's Party
Pakistan Muslim League (N)
Pakistan Muslim League (Q)
Jamiat Ulema-e-Islam
Pakistan Tehreek-e-Insaf
Pashtunkhwa Milli Awami Party
Independent

	Leaders of the Opposition	Portrait	Starting term	Ending term	Political affiliation	Political ideology
1	Kiran Shankar Roy		9 August 1947	22 January 1948	Indian National Congress	Secularism
2	Sris Chandra Chattopadhyaya		28 February 1948	24 October 1954	Pakistan National Congress	Secularism
3	Huseyn Shaheed Suhrawardy		7 July 1955	11 September 1956	Awami League	Islamic socialism
4	I. I. Chundrigar		16 December 1957	1 October 1958	Muslim League	Pakistani nationalism
5	Sardar Bahadur Khan		8 June 1962	23 December 1963	Council Muslim League	Islamic democracy
6	Yusuf Khattak		24 December 1963	22 January 1965	Council Muslim League	Islamic democracy
7	Nurul Amin		12 June 1965	25 March 1969	National Democratic Front	Pakistani conservatism
8	Khan Abdul Wali Khan		14 April 1972	17 August 1975	National Awami Party	Democratic socialism
9	Mufti Mehmood		17 August 1975	5 July 1977	Jamiat Ulema-e-Islam	Islamism
10	Haji Saifullah Khan		23 March 1985	19 March 1987	Independent Parliamentary Group	National conservatism
11	Syed Fakhar Imam		3 May 1987	29 May 1988	Independent Parliamentary Group	National conservatism
12	Khan Abdul Wali Khan		2 December 1988	6 August 1990	Awami National Party	Democratic socialism
13	Benazir Bhutto		6 November 1990	18 July 1993	Pakistan People's Party	Democratic socialism
14	Nawaz Sharif		19 October 1993	5 November 1996	Pakistan Muslim League (N)	Pakistani conservatism
15	Benazir Bhutto		17 February 1997	12 October 1999	Pakistan People's Party	Democratic socialism
16	Fazal-ur-Rehman		25 March 2004	15 November 2007	Jamiat Ulema-e-Islam	Religious conservatism
17	Parvez Elahi		10 April 2008	16 September 2008	Pakistan Muslim League (Q)	Conservatism
18	Chaudhry Nisar Ali Khan		17 September 2008	7 June 2013	Pakistan Muslim League (N)	Pakistani conservatism
19	Khurshid Shah		7 June 2013	31 May 2018	Pakistan People's Party	Democratic socialism
20	Shehbaz Sharif		20 August 2018	10 April 2022	Pakistan Muslim League (N)	Pakistani conservatism
21	Raja Riaz		20 May 2022	10 August 2023	Pakistan Tehreek-e-Insaf	Centrism
22	Omar Ayub		2 April 2024	8 August 2025	Pakistan Tehreek-e-Insaf	Constitutionalism
23	Mehmood Khan Achakzai		16 January 2026	Incumbent	Pashtunkhwa Milli Awami Party	Pashtun nationalism

== See also ==
- National Assembly of Pakistan
- Government of Pakistan
- Politics of Pakistan
- Pakistan
