= Tasneem Gardezi =

Pakistani politician

Syed Tasneem Nawaz Gardezi (died 2021) was a Pakistani politician who was a member of the National Assembly of Pakistan from 1985 to 1988. He served as the minister of state for Information and Broadcasting from 15 May 1988 to 29 May 1988.

Gardezi belonged from Bahawalpur. In 2003, he was elected from NA-187 in by-polls.
