= Hanif Tayyab =

Pakistani islamic scholar, politician

Hanif Tayyab (born 1947) is a Pakistani Islamic scholar and politician who is the current head of Nizam-e-Mustafa Party. He previously served as a member of the National Assembly of Pakistan from 1985 to 1988. He served as the federal minister of Labour, Manpower & Overseas Pakistanis from 10 April 1985 to 28 January 1986. Tayyab has also been a member of the Sunni Ittihad Council (SIC).

Hanif Tayyab was born in 1947 to a Memon family. He studied at the University of Karachi and Federal Urdu University. He also received honorary Doctorate of Philosophy degree from the University of Karachi which generated a bit of controversy.
