= Mehran Bijarani =

Pakistani poet and politician

Mir Mehran Khan Bijarani (d. 2011) was a Pakistani politician and poet who was one of the founding members of the Pakistan People's Party. He was a member of the National Assembly of Pakistan from 1977 to 1993. He also served as the minister of state for Culture and Tourism from 28 January 1986 to 20 December 1986. He was elected unopposed as member of National Assembly in 1977. He also served as the member of Pakistan's first Senate from August 1973 to August 1975. He died on 12 March 2011, leaving behind five sons and two daughters.
