= Maqsood Ahmed Khan Leghari =

Pakistani politician

Maqsood Khan Leghari

Member of the Provincial Assembly of the Punjab
- In office 1993–1996
- Constituency: PP-202 Dera Ghazi Khan

Personal details
- Born: 1 January 1944 Dera Ghazi Khan
- Died: 30 August 2018 (aged 74) Dera Ghazi Khan, Punjab, Pakistan
- Party: Pakistan Peoples Party

Sardar Maqsood Ahmed Khan Leghari (1944 - 2018) was a Pakistani politician.

== Biography ==
Leghari was born on January 1, 1944, to a political family. He is a graduate of Government College, Lahore.

Leghari was elected to the National Assembly of Pakistan in 1985 and held the position of Federal Minister for the Labour & Manpower. He was a continuous member of the Punjab Provincial Assembly, from 1988 to 1999. His roles in the Punjab government included serving as Minister for the Food Department from 1988 to 1989 and as Minister for Irrigation & Power Department from 1993 to 1996.
