= Yasin Wattoo =

Pakistani politician

Mian Muhammad Yasin Khan Wattoo was a Pakistani politician who was the Finance Minister of Pakistan from 1986 to 1988.

He died on 29 April 2002 in a road accident.

== Early life and career ==
Wattoo was born in 1929, in Jamal Kot village of Depalpur Tehsil of Okara District.

He joined politics in 1956. In 1961, he was elected to the West Pakistan Assembly. He also served as the Provincial Minister for Education, and Law Minister of Punjab.

In 1971, he was elected the first vice-chairman of the Punjab Bar Council.

In 1977, he became the Federal Minister for Education in Zulfikar Ali Bhutto's cabinet.

In the 1985 election, he was again elected and became a member of the National Assembly of Pakistan and served as Federal Minister for Finance and Education. In 1990, he was elected as a member of the National Assembly of Pakistan and served as the Federal Minister for Petroleum and Natural Resources.

In 1997, he was again elected and became a member of the National Assembly of Pakistan and served as the Federal Minister for Parliamentary Affairs.
