= Muhammad Khan Junejo =

Prime Minister of Pakistan from 1985 to 1988

- محمد خان جونیجو
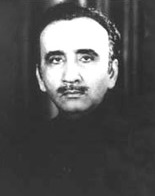
- Junejo in 1986

10th Prime Minister of Pakistan
- In office 24 March 1985 – 29 May 1988
- President: Muhammad Zia-ul-Haq
- Preceded by: Zulfikar Ali Bhutto (1977)
- Succeeded by: Benazir Bhutto

Minister of Defence
- In office 24 March 1985 – 29 May 1988

Minister of Interior
- In office 15 April 1985 – 21 May 1985
- Preceded by: Lt.Gen F.S. Khan Lodhi
- Succeeded by: Aslam Khan

Minister of Railways
- In office 5 July 1978 – 23 April 1979
- Preceded by: N. A. Qureshi
- Succeeded by: Major-General Jamal Said Khan
- In office 1965–1969
- President: Ayub Khan
- Preceded by: F.M. Khan
- Succeeded by: Admiral S.M. Ahsan

Minister of Health, Communications and Labour
- In office 1963–1965

President of Pakistan Muslim League
- In office 23 March 1985 – 29 May 1988
- Preceded by: Chaudhry Zahoor Elahi
- Succeeded by: Pir Pagara

Personal details
- Born: Mohammad Khan Junejo; 18 August 1932 Sindhri, Sind, Bombay Presidency, British India
- Died: 18 March 1993 (aged 60) Baltimore, Maryland, United States
- Cause of death: Leukemia
- Resting place: Sindhri, Sindh, Pakistan
- Citizenship: Pakistan
- Party: Pakistan Muslim League (1962–1988)
- Other political affiliations: Pakistan Muslim League (J) (1988–93)
- Spouse: Begum Junejo
- Children: Fiza Junejo (daughter); Asad Junejo (son); Kulsoom Junejo (daughter)
- Education: St. Patrick's College; Plumpton College

Muhammad Khan Junejo (Note: Urdu: محمد خان جونیجو; Sindhi: محمد خان جوڻيجو) (18 August 1932 – 18 March 1993) was a Pakistani politician and statesman who served as the tenth prime minister of Pakistan from 1985 to 1988 under president Zia-ul-Haq. He sought to strengthen the parliamentary system and assert civilian control over national affairs, (Note: Including state affairs, foreign affairs and military appointments) which resulted in tensions with the Zia administration, ultimately leading to his dismissal.

His inquiries into the Ojhri Camp Disaster, appointment of Aslam Beg as VCOAS, various Corps Commanders, growing control over senior military promotions, decision to help negotiate the withdrawal of Soviet forces from Afghanistan, rejecting Zia appointments in his cabinet, stance against martial law, austerity policies and purported spying on Zia through the civilianized Intelligence Bureau all contributed to the souring in their relation.

Junejo was an influential landowner and involved in the agricultural industry. He was educated in Karachi, where he attended the St. Patrick's College, and was trained as an agriculturist at Agricultural Institute, Plumpton College in the United Kingdom. He gained public notice when he joined the Ayub administration and subsequently held cabinet portfolio of railways, health, communications and labour from 1963 to 1969.

After participating in the 1985 elections, he was chosen to form the government on Pakistan Muslim League's platform, of which, he took over the party's presidency. His government was noted for its support of conservatism, austerity measures that reduced the government budget deficit, and repealing of the emergency laws which allowed the freedom of press and media in the country. Despite strong resistance and fierce opposition from President Zia-ul-Haq, Junejo authorized his Foreign Minister Zain Noorani to sign and ratify the Geneva Accords in 1988. His relations with President Zia-ul-Haq further soured when he opened a parliamentary inquiry on the Ojhri Camp disaster in 1988. On 29 May 1988, Prime Minister Junejo was dismissed by President Zia over charges on incompetence and economic stagflation and immediately called for new general elections. After the general elections held in 1988, he led his own faction while holding ceremonial party's presidency.

== Early life and education ==
Mohammad Khan Junejo belonged to a Sindhi Rajput Family. He hailed from an influential agriculturalist family in Sindh that had a traditional conservative mindset.

He was educated at the St. Patrick's High School in Karachi and later graduated from the St. Patrick's College. He went to Hastings in England where he was trained as an agriculturist and earned a diploma to be certified in 1954.

Junejo was an agriculturist and a farmer who cultivated the famed Sindhri mangoes in his local village in Mirpur Khas. His father, Deen Mohammed Junejo a landowner in modern-day Mirpurkhas District (Sindhri) is also notable for being the one to introduce South Indian variety of mango to his plantations, which over time developed into the Sindhri mango. Junejo was a conservative Muslim and a dominant figure in his village, who had his wife living in the village for her entire life, and kept her out of public sight even when he was elected as prime minister and eventually moved to Prime Minister's Secretariat. Nothing or very little was known about his wife as he often traveled and visited other states with his elder daughter; he was married with five children.

== Early political career ==
Upon returning from the United Kingdom in 1954, he joined the Pakistan Muslim League (PML) and under Ayub Khan's Basic Democracies system was elected as Chairman of the Sanghar Local Board (or mayor for Sanghar District) and worked as a party worker for the Muslim League until 1963. He participated in elections and was elected for West-Pakistan legislative assembly and soon he joined the Ayub administration and subsequently held cabinet department of Health, Communications and Labour until 1965. He again successfully participated in the presidential elections in 1965 and was elevated as the Minister of Railways under the Ayub administration which he served until 1969.

From 1970 to 1977, he was unable to defend his constituency from Sanghar but became closer to religious leader Pir Pagara, of which he later became his political missionary and devoted disciple (murid) of the Pir. In 1977, he was named as a caretaker cabinet minister when General Zia-ul-Haq, the chief of army staff, took over the civilian government led by Prime Minister Zulfikar Ali Bhutto. From 1977 to 1979, he served as the Railway minister but later resigned in 1979.

== Prime Minister of Pakistan (1985-1988) ==
=== Election ===
In January 1985, President Zia-ul-Haq announced to hold nationwide general elections that would be based on non-partisanism– there have been political rumors that the U.S. President Ronald Reagan had a subsequent political role in such regards.

Junejo was successful in defending his constituency from the Sanghar District and was known to be a religiopolitical missionary of Pir Pagara who had been leading his own political faction in Sindh. President Zia considered three names for the appointment of the Prime Minister that included: Ghulam Mustafa Jatoi, Liaquat Ali Jatoi and Junejo– all were from Sindh.

Two days after the promulgation of the RCO (Revival of Constitution 1973 Order) on 2 March 1985, President Muhammad Zia-ul-Haq held a meeting with the Martial Law Administrators (MLAs) to select a prime minister. According to amendments in the constitution the President was to nominate a prime minister from the newly elected National Assembly. The MLAs decided since that former deposed prime minister, Z. A. Bhutto was Sindhi, the new prime minister should also be from Sindh. The MLAs supported the candidacy of Elahi Bakhsh Soomro over Mohammad Khan Junejo (who was also shortlisted). However, after General Zia's consultation with Pir Sahib Pagara led to the dropping of Soomro and Junejo being selected for the role.

President Zia hand-picked and appointed Junejo as prime minister through an invitation to form the civilian government in accordance with the Revival of Constitution Order (RCO). His mindset reflected a conservatism and was a powerful feudalist whom President Zia considered him to be ineffective in leading towards the decision-making processes. and after securing votes in the Parliament through the Vote of Confidence (VoC), he met with President Zia and reportedly asking him about the ending of the martial law. According to General Khalid Mahmud Arif, Junejo neither expressed happiness or thanked Zia after news of his appointment as prime minister.

=== End of Martial Law ===
On 20 March at 8:00 PM, Zia welcomed Junejo in his office and told him he planned to nominate him as Prime Minister of Pakistan, Junejo rather than thank the President instead immediately questioned him "When do you plan to remove Martial Law?" Zia tried to convince the Prime Minister that Martial Law would now support the Prime Minister. Early in his premiership during an address as the National Assembly, Junejo stated that Martial Law and Democracy could not coexist. Zia did not appreciate these remarks and Gen Mujibur Rehman, Zia's information secretary had them expunged from the PTV telecast.

On 30 December 1985 Martial Law was lifted after Junejo had managed to "push" Zia enough.

=== Civilian Premiership ===
Following the lifting of martial law on his repeated instances Junejo announced his cabinet in which he rejected many of Zia's cabinet appointments, only accepting Sahibzada Yaqub Khan as foreign minister and Mahbubul Haq as Minister for Planning and Development and later Finance Minister. Junejo also removed Lt. Gen. Mujibur Rehman from his position as Secretary of the Ministry of Information. Anwar Zahid, a civil servant posted by Zia as the Principal Secretary to the Prime Minister was replaced by Junejo by Captain Usman Ali Isani, which whom he was more comfortable. He kept two ministerial departments of defence and interior.

He also overrode Zia-ul-Haq's objections to on having the same military staff as the president (e.g. MS and Aide-de-Camps) on the basis that the previous deposed PM Z. A. Bhutto had this privilege. He also exercised his own judgement in the appointment of key officials including federal secretaries, ambassadors, chief secretaries and inspectors-general of police. Junejo demanded the right to join the president in the ceremonial state coach and to jointly take salute on the occasion of the 23rd-March parade, later winning the right to independently act as chief guest on the 14th August official ceremony.

Prime Minister Junejo's social policies led to the political independence when he was appointed as the President of Pakistan Muslim League. His policy also included the freedom of the press despite the opposition he faced from President Zia in this issue. He gained popularity for his daring stance and disagreement with Zia over a number of issues.

On the economic front, he took the austerity measures and ultimately halted the Islamization of Economy process ran under the Zia regime, which put him at odds with President Zia.

Junejo attended every session of parliament and remained accessible even after office hours in order to build ties with members of parliament who were elected on non-party basis and had their own personal power bases. In an order issued through the Pakistan Banking Council (PBC), no bank was authorized to sanction a loan to any political office-holder without first referring the matter to him.

The Prime Minister also had an interest in foreign relations, meeting with President Ronald Reagan in 1986, Rajiv Gandhi at the 1987 SAARC Summit in Kathmandu, and the Emperor of Japan, Hirohito the same year.

Junejo was in Skardu when he received word that element in Parliament were mustering support to defeat the vote schedule for the June 1985 budget. The Prime Minister then spent the next two days on the phone with members of the National Assembly identifying issues in proposed tax changes which were causing problems. He then requested the finance minister to remove the most unpopular ones before the vote. The finance minister then suggested austerity measures to offset losses in taxes. One of the proposed measures was to make it mandatory for members of the cabinet and civil officers who were entitled official cars to use locally assembled 1000cc vehicles. Junejo sought to implement these austerity measures in the 1987-88 Federal Budget.

When Junejo made the announcement in parliament in June 1987 he added generals to the austerity list, which received widespread media coverage and editorial praise. The budget was passed.

Junejo continued to speak publicly about reducing the perks and privileges of senior military officers, at one point threatening to remove their large staff cars and putting them in domestically produced Suzuki mini-cars and said, "secretaries aur generals bad-shah log hain". This evoked a response from (Retired) Lt. Gen. Ejaz Azim on the newspaper The Muslim on 28 June 1987, who according to Shuja Nawaz was encouraged by Zia to write an article that defended the senior leadership of the army.

When Benazir Bhutto returned to Pakistan, Zia maintained that her supporters would not be allowed to welcome her at the airport. At a meeting in Lahore chaired by Zia, Junejo said the government should under no circumstances stop the crowds. "There is democracy in the country," Further remarking. "We cannot prevent people from gathering to receive her." Junejo managed to prevail over the President.

In order to strengthen his own position Junejo sought to create a government party. Political parties could be officially registered from February 1986 onwards, but Junejo registered a new reconstituted Pakistan Muslim League (PML) a month early, linking his with the Pagaro Muslim League, becoming President of the new party, which was the only party legally allowed to hold the name 'Muslim League.' Following the response accorded to Benazir Bhutto, convinced Junejo that the party would need populist support. Its eleven-resolution manifesto published on 2 July promised economic reforms for the rural and urban poor, even of Junejo lacked the political base to do so. He gained legislative support by allowing members of the National Assembly to disburse development funds and residential plots to their own constituents.

=== Political conflict with Zia ===
In 1986–87, his political relations with President Zia began to deteriorate over the control of foreign policy. Against Zia's wishes Junejo authorized his Foreign Minister Zain Noorani to ratify the Geneva Accords that allowed the Russian retreat from Afghanistan. In this regard, he had held a party conference where he invited the Communist Party and Pakistan People's Party to discuss to end the bloodshed in Afghanistan. In 1987, he provided his political support and eventually used his prerogative to appoint Lieutenant-General Mirza Aslam Beg as vice-army chief, despite President Zia wanting Lieutenant-General Zahid Ali Akbar, who was instead sent to DESTO.

Junejo began to assert his authority in the appointments of senior army officers and approving promotions to three and four-star ranks. He would also withhold promotions until those he wished to promote were also promoted. An example being Lt. Gen. Shamim Alam Khan who later became Chairman Joint Chiefs of Staff Committee (CJCSC), whose promotion on Junejo's insistence only came after Zia's choice Major General Pirdad Khan was also promoted. Junejo had sat on Pirdad Khan's promotion until Zia agreed to Alam's. Prior to his dismissal the latest appointments of corp commanders would also be approved by him. General M. Shariff was promoted to Lieutenant General and became commander of V Corps in Karachi in May 1988 by Junejo. To replace the outgoing VCOAS, Zia recommended Lt. General Zahid Ali Akbar Khan, however Junejo turned down the recommendation and instead promoted Mirza Aslam Beg to the position.

Prime Minister Junejo also stalled the fundamentalist legislation in an attempt to keep leverage on President Zia. Following the massive explosion near the hidden Ojhri camp facility in Rawalpindi Cantonment that resulted in more than 100 lives lost, Prime Minister Junejo announced to call for a parliamentary inquiry to overlook the incident. After ordering an initial inquiry under Gen Imran Ullah Khan he changed his stance over fears of cover up and constituted another committee under Aslam Khattak, Qazi Abdul Majeed Abid, Ibrahim Baloch and Rana Naeem. Junejo informed the media that he would present the committee's report to the National Assembly and punish those responsible. According to Salman Faruqui, this was the "final nail in the coffin" for the Zia-Junejo relationship. Yusuf Zaman called it the "final straw which broke the camel’s back." According to Ian Talbot, the investigation threatened to embarrass the ISI, General Arif also claimed that Zia's desire to exonerate former ISI director, General Akhtar Abdur Rahman would play a factor in the later dismissal of Junejo under Article 58(2)(b).

In 1986 he re-asserted civilian control over the Intelligence Bureau (IB), replacing a serving major general, Agha Nek Mohammad with police officer Mian Aslam Hayat. Zia was told that the Prime Minister had ordered surveillance of him, which was to be conducted by the Civilian Intelligence Bureau (IB). According to General Arif, the President ordered the head of Signal Corps to confiscate all the recording equipment of the IB following the dismissal of Junejo. This equipment would later be released without screening. General Refaqat, the Presidents new COS was also blamed in the souring of relations between Zia ul Haq and Mohammad Junejo.

On 28 May 1988, DG ISPR Brigadier Siddique Salik informed Prime Minister Junejo of President Zia holding the press conference the next day in this regard, terming it "very important." On 29 May 1988, President Zia appeared on PTV News and surprisingly announced to have dissolved the Parliament, using the Eighth Amendment. Many investigative newspapers and political gossips pointed that it was the inquiry report on the "Ojhri Camp disaster" that implicated the military members in Zia's administration despite President Zia claiming of Junejo's Government had been dismissed because the law-and-order situation had broken down to an alarming extent and the government could not be run in accordance with the Constitution.

== Later political career ==
During the general elections held in 1988 his Junejo Muslim League joined the Islami Jamhoori Ittehad alliance. He was unsuccessful for defending his constituency but was elected for the National Assembly general elections held in 1990 and remained head of the Pakistan Muslim League (J). During the run up to the 1990 elections, the ISI reportedly provided financing to the opponents of the Pakistan Peoples Party. Following a case registered by (Retired) Air Marshal Asghar Khan against Gen Aslam Beg, DG-ISI Asad Durrani and Yunus Habib, Durrani produced an affidavit listing those who had received money from the ISI. A report from Ardeshir Cowasjee, a newspaper columnist, based on the affidavit included Junejo, who reportedly received Rs. 2.5 million from the ISI.

After sacking Junejo, Zia attempted to have Junejo removed as President of PML. Despite Zia's support to candidates such as Nawaz Sharif he failed to remove Junejo. Following the death of Junejo, Nawaz Sharif nominated himself as President of the Pakistan Muslim League on 21 March 1993.

== Later life and death ==
In 1993, he was diagnosed with leukemia and went to the United States for the treatment where he was treated at the Johns Hopkins Hospital in Baltimore, Maryland, United States, where he died the same year. He was brought and buried in his locality.

His widow, Begum Junejo, died in Karachi on 13 July 2003, at the age of 60.

== Legacy ==
Former Federal Secretary and Press Secretary to Junejo Syed Anwar Mahmood, writing an editorial in The News International called Junejo "honest to the marrow," who led "by example" and claimed he "never compromised" on integrity and merit. Further remarking he could not recall a democratically elected government in Pakistan governing so "fairly, cleanly and effectively," writing that its dismissal by Zia Ul Haq "derailed the democratic train so badly that it continues to wobble even today."

Journalist Shaikh Aziz called Junejo a "calm person" who never showed "high ambitions", when he was in communications with Ayub Khan. But after questioning Zia over the lifting of Martial Law he thought of becoming a "real prime minister". Also calling him a "thorough gentleman" and "true disciplinarian", who "possessed a reputation of unquestionable integrity."

According to Ishtiaq Ahmed, "Instead of being the pliant protégé, Junejo turned out to be a man of principles and integrity—which Zia found unacceptable."

Salman Faruqui, a former civil servant writing in Dawn claimed due to his farming background, Junejo was often able to foresee rough weather and gathering storms and would move accordingly. Further asserting "He had demonstrated leadership to a brutalised nation and given it some hope." Who conducted himself with "integrity and dignity, caring for the poor and downtrodden."

Ian Talbot in Pakistan: A Modern History stated that "Even on apparently trivial matters of protocol, Junejo sought to do everything possible to raise the dignity of the Prime Minister's office."

His public image was popular in politics for his driving of blue coloured Suzuki FX and, he popularly drove the FX in Islamabad despite the annoyance of President Zia who had a strong preference for Mercedes-Benz W126.

== Notes ==
Political offices
Preceded by Zulfikar Ali Bhutto	Prime Minister of Pakistan; 1985–1988	Succeeded by Benazir Bhutto
Preceded by Zulfikar Ali Bhutto	Minister of Defence; 1985–1988	Succeeded by Mahmoud Haroon; Acting
Preceded by Sardar Khan Lodi	Minister of the Interior; 1985	Succeeded by Muhammad Aslam Khan Khattak
