= 1985 Pakistani general election =

- 25 February 1985

217 of the 237 seats in the National Assembly 109 seats needed for a majority
- Registered: 32,528,996
- Turnout: 53.70% (▼0.98pp)
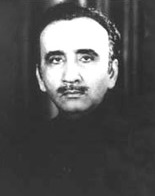
	First party
Leader	Muhammad Khan Junejo
Party	Independents
Seats won	217
Percentage	100%
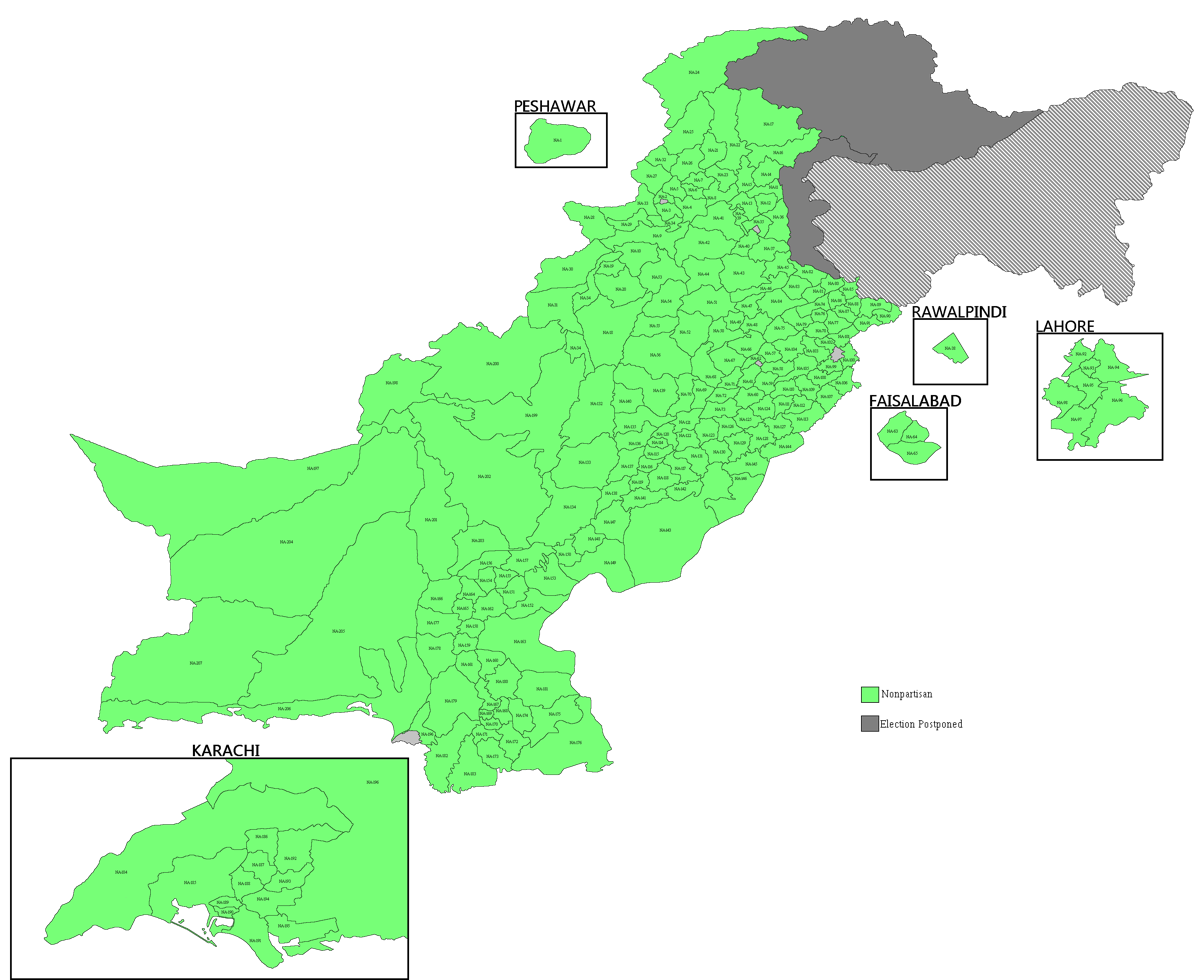
- Results by constituency
Prime Minister before election
None (Note: Vacant since 1977 due to martial law)
Elected Prime Minister
Muhammad Khan Junejo
Independent

General elections were held in Pakistan on 25 February 1985 to elect members of the National Assembly. The elections were held under the military government of Muhammad Zia-ul-Haq after the restoration of the 1973 constitution.

Around 1,300 candidates contested the elections, which were held on a nonpartisan basis. Each candidate was required to have their nomination paper signed by 50 registered voters from the constituency they wished to stand in. In an attempt to disqualify a large number of opposition candidates and secure a conservative leadership, Zia-ul-Haq introduced amendments to the Political Parties Act of 1962. As a result, the Movement for the Restoration of Democracy (MRD), which was calling for an end to the military regime, boycotted the elections.

Voter turnout was 54%. Most of the elected MNAs were supporters of the Zia regime. A new government was formed under the leadership of Muhammad Khan Junejo, a lesser known figure in national politics. Prime Minister Junejo and his followers subsequently established the pro-Zia conservative Pakistan Muslim League.

== Results ==
Party	Votes	%	Seats
Independents	16,889,392	100.00	217
Seats reserved for women			20
Total	16,889,392	100.00	237
Valid votes	16,889,392	96.69	
Invalid/blank votes	578,641	3.31	
Total votes	17,468,033	100.00	
Registered voters/turnout	32,528,996	53.70	
Source: FAFEN

== Aftermath ==
Following the elections, Muhammad Khan Junejo was appointed prime minister and later formed a new party, the Pakistan Muslim League. Immediately after taking office, he won a unanimous vote of confidence from the newly elected National Assembly. The election boycott was viewed to have been a misstep for the MRD, which had assumed the public would support its stance.
