= Vice President of Pakistan =

Political office which existed between 1971 and 1973

- نائب صدر پاکستان
- Coat of arms of Pakistan
- Style: Mr. Vice President (informal); The Honourable (formal); His Excellency (diplomatic)
- Status: Deputy head of state
- Member of: National Assembly; Central Ministry
- Reports to: President of Pakistan
- Seat: Islamabad
- Formation: 20 December 1971
- Abolished: 14 August 1973

The vice presidency of Pakistan (Urdu: نائب صدر پاکستان) was a political office which existed between 1971 and 1973. In practice, it was the second highest office in the country after the presidency of Pakistan, holding the status of the deputy head of state, and ranking first in the presidential line of succession. Established in December 1971, the post remained in effect until the 1973 Constitution of Pakistan was promulgated in August 1973, under which it was formally abolished.

Nurul Amin remains the first and only officeholder in Pakistan's history to have occupied this position.

== History ==
The office of vice president was established in December 1971. It followed the suspension of the 1962 constitution and the imposition of martial law earlier in March 1969 by general Yahya Khan. Yahya also dissolved the parliament, dismissed civilian officials from Ayub's administration, and enforced law and order while declaring himself president and Chief Martial Law Administrator (CMLA). Because the post was created during martial law and was not specified in the preceding constitution, it did not have practical and legally defined functions. According to Rafi Raza, it had a symbolic significance in the sense that it would provide East Pakistan representation in the federation's executive branch of government.

The vice president reserved the power to serve as acting president during the president's official absence or overseas trips. On 29 May 1972, Bhutto embarked on a 13-day state visit to 14 countries across Africa and the Middle East, returning on 10 June. During this time, Amin stepped in as acting president. He is reported to have performed this duty on multiple occasions, participating in public events, conferences and site visits in presidential capacity.

Amin was of Bengali origin.

Amin was sworn in as vice president a second time on 23 April 1972, following the introduction of an interim constitution, which also required Bhutto to take oath again as president on 21 April. The interim constitution brought about the end of martial law under which the country had been operating, and conferred power to the new civilian government.

After the 1973 constitution, Bhutto assumed the role of Prime Minister. Under the new constitution, the president was largely a ceremonial figurehead whilst the Prime Minister was granted greater executive powers. The constitution was framed by members of the National Assembly and came into effect on 14 August 1973.

Under the current line of succession, the Chairman of the Senate shall act as president in the event of the president's absence, resignation, removal or death, or if the president is unable to discharge official duties. The Speaker of the National Assembly stands second in the line of succession. The office of the acting president remains in force until a president is elected through the Electoral College, in accordance with Article 41(3) of the constitution.

== Vice president ==
No.	Portrait	Name (Birth–death)	Took office	Left office	Political party (Alliance)		Note(s)	Ref(s)
1		Nurul Amin (1893–1974)	20 December 1971	14 August 1973	Pakistan Democratic Party	PDP	Served as vice president.	

== See also ==
- Acting President of Pakistan
- Caretaker Prime Minister of Pakistan
- Deputy Prime Minister of Pakistan
