= Aide-de-camp =

Personal assistant or secretary to a person of high rank

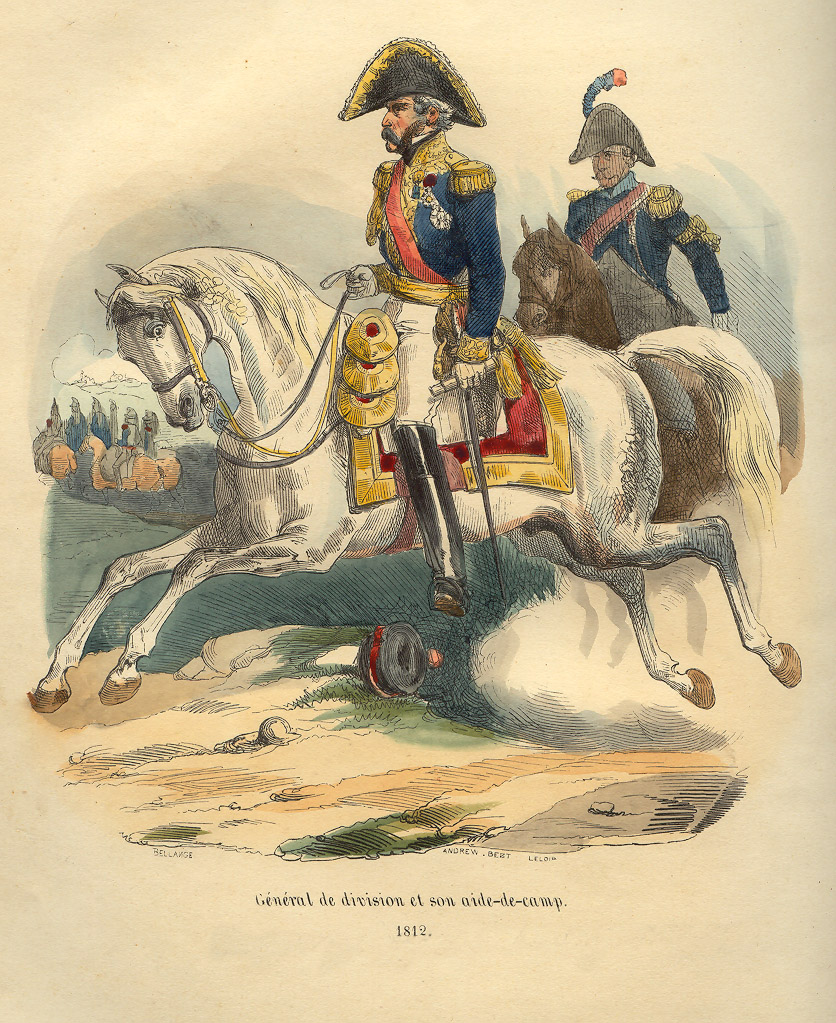
A French Imperial Army aide-de-camp (right)

An aide-de-camp (/ˌeɪd dɪ ˈkæmp, -ˈkɒmp/; French: [ɛd də kɑ̃]; plural: aides-de-camp) is a personal assistant or secretary to a person of high rank, usually a senior military, police or government officer, or to a member of a royal family or a head of state. The term comes from a French expression meaning "helper in the military camp".

An aide-de-camp may participate at ceremonial functions, and the first aide-de-camp is typically the foremost personal aide. This is not to be confused with an adjutant, who is the senior administrator of a military unit.

The badge of office for an aide-de-camp is usually the aiguillette, a braided cord in gold or other colours, worn on the shoulder of a uniform. Whether it is worn on the left or the right shoulder is dictated by protocol.

In some countries, aide-de-camp is considered to be a title of honour, which confers the post-nominal letters ADC or A de C.

== Argentina ==
In Argentina, three officers, one from each armed service, of the rank of lieutenant colonel or its equivalent, are appointed as aide-de-camp to the president of the republic and three others to the minister of defence, these six being the only ones to be called edecán, which is one Spanish translation for aide-de-camp (edecán is a phonetic rendition of the French term; ayuda or ayudante de campo is a calque).

A controversy was raised in 2006, when president Néstor Kirchner promoted his army aide-de-camp, Lieutenant Colonel Graham, to colonel, one year ahead of his class. Upon becoming president, Cristina Kirchner decided to have, for the first time, female officers as her aides-de-camp.

In each of the armed forces, the chief of staff and other senior officers have their own adjutants, normally of the rank of major or lieutenant colonel, or its equivalent. At unit level, the unit S1 (personnel officer) doubles as the unit commander's adjutant, although in recent times in many units this practice has been left only for ceremonial purposes, while for everyday duties a senior non-commissioned officer performs the adjutant's activities.

An aiguillette is worn on the right shoulder by aides-de-camp and adjutants as a symbol of their position, the colour of the aiguillette depending on the rank of the person they are serving (there are golden, tan, silver and red aiguillettes, as well as an olive-green one for combat uniform).

== Belgium ==
In Belgium, the Head of the King's Military Household is a two, three or four-star General who helps the King exercise the powers vested in him by the constitution in the field of defence. He monitors the international security situation and informs the King accordingly. He keeps the King posted of the situation, means and resources, functioning and missions of the Belgian Armed Forces, in close cooperation with the King's Cabinet. The Head of the Military Household also oversees the coordination with the security detail of the Royal Palace and runs the Information Technology Service.

The Aides de Camp to the King are general or senior officers assigned by the King to accompany important visitors or to represent him on occasions when he cannot be present himself.

The Equerries to the King are at the King's constant disposal on a rotational basis; they accompany him on his travels and assist him in performing his daily tasks.

The title of honorary aide-de-camp to the king can be granted by the royal court for services rendered. Notable people include Major General Baron Édouard Empain, Count Charles John d'Oultremont, and Lieutenant General Baron Albert du Roy de Blicquy.

== Commonwealth of Nations countries ==
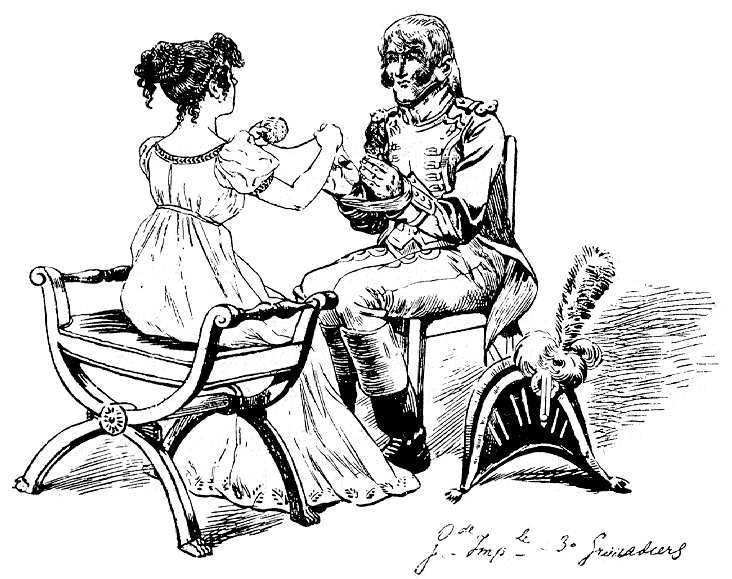
Her Aide-de-Camp, a 19th-century humorous and symbolic drawing

In Commonwealth of Nations countries, aides-de-camp are mostly appointed from military or auxiliary services. They are entitled to use the letters ADC or A de C after their names. The emblem of the office is the aiguillette worn on their uniform.

=== Australia ===
In Australia, Australian Defence Force officers serve as aides-de-camp to specific senior appointments, such as the monarch, governor-general, state governors, chief of the Defence Force, and other specified Army, Navy and Air Force command appointments. Honorary aides-de-camp to the governor-general or state governors are entitled to the post-nominal ADC during their appointment.

Officers of and above the ranks of rear admiral, major general, and air vice-marshal in specifically designated command appointments are entitled to an aide-de-camp with the army rank of captain (or equivalent). Within the navy, an aide-de-camp is called a "flag lieutenant" and senior naval officers are called "flag officers".

=== Bangladesh ===
In Bangladesh, an aide-de-camp (ADC) is a commissioned military officer appointed to assist a senior military or state official in official, ceremonial, administrative, and liaison duties. Officers of the Bangladesh Army, Bangladesh Navy, and Bangladesh Air Force may serve as aides-de-camp to designated senior appointments. ADCs may accompany their principals during official engagements, military ceremonies, state functions, inspections, and other formal occasions. The position is also used within the Bangladesh Armed Forces for senior military appointments, including corps and divisional commanders.

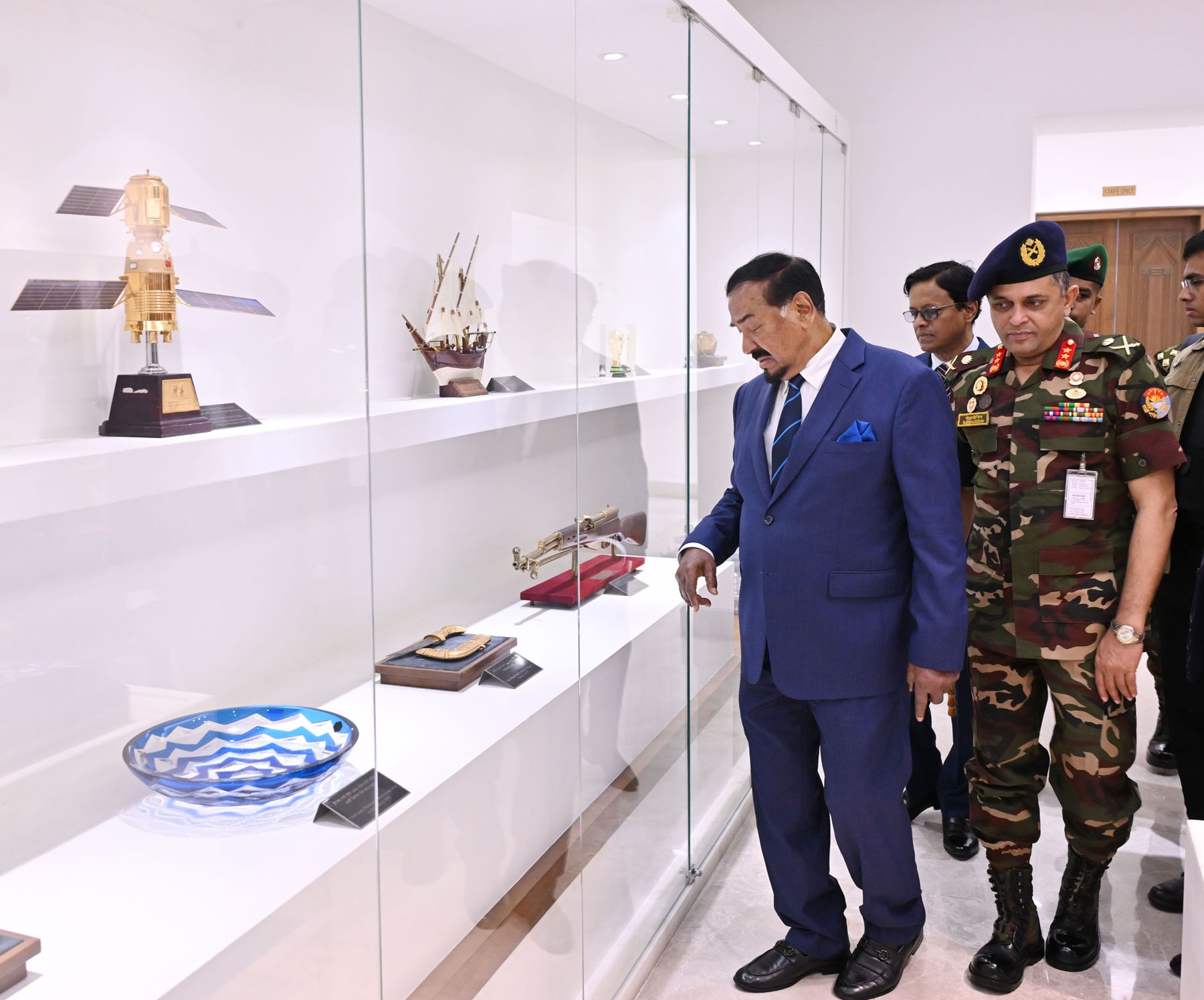
An officer of the Bangladesh Armed Forces serving as aide-de-camp to President Hafizuddin Ahmed

The Bangladesh Army regulations provide for an ADC to the Chief of Army Staff, as well as ADCs to corps commanders and infantry and armoured division commanders. The regulations specify an ADC to the Chief of Army Staff at the rank of captain, while ADCs to corps and division commanders may be appointed from the rank of captain or junior commissioned officer, depending on the appointment.

The regulations also provide for military secretaries and ADCs to the President and Prime Minister. Their normal tenure is two years, with the possibility of an extension of one additional year in special cases. Officers below the rank of major general, as well as officers of the Regular or Supplementary Reserve who have rendered distinguished service, may also be appointed as honorary aides-de-camp to the President. Such honorary appointments terminate when the President relinquishes office.

The appointment has also been held by notable Bangladeshi military officers during their careers. For example, General Abu Belal Muhammad Shafiul Haque served as ADC to the President of Bangladesh before later becoming Chief of Army Staff. During the Bangladesh Liberation War, Sheikh Kamal served as aide-de-camp to General M. A. G. Osmani, the Commander-in-Chief of the Bangladesh Liberation Forces.

=== Bermuda ===
In 1973, Sir Richard Sharples, then governor of Bermuda, and his aide-de-camp, Captain Hugh Sayers, were murdered on the grounds of Government House.

=== Canada ===
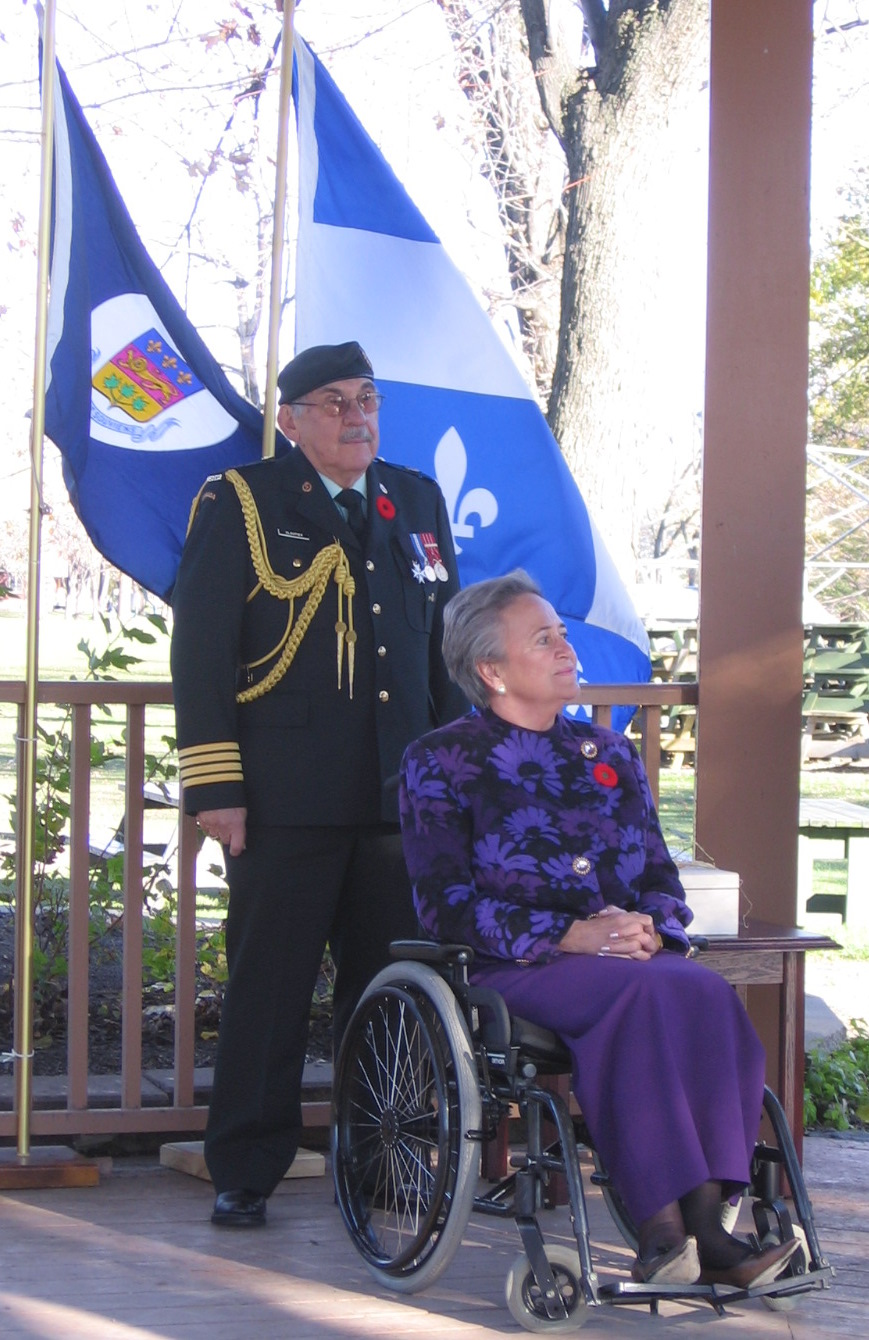
Aide-de-camp Colonel Jean-Claude Cloutier with lieutenant-governor of Quebec Lise Thibault in 2006

Royal Canadian Navy shoulder boards worn by honorary aides-de-camp to the lieutenant-governors of British Columbia (left) Quebec (centre), and New Brunswick (right)

Aides-de-camp in Canada are appointed to the monarch and some members of the royal family, the governor general, lieutenant governors, and to certain other appointments (e.g., Minister of National Defence, flag and general officers, Canadian heads of mission, foreign heads of state visiting Canada).

In addition to the military officers appointed as full-time aides-de-camp to the governor general, several other flag, general, and senior officers are appointed ex officio as honorary aides-de-camp to the governor general or members of the royal family including:

- Chief of the Defence Staff
- Commandant of the Royal Military College of Canada
- A senior officer of the Quebec-based Royal 22^{e} Régiment
- Commanding officer, the Governor General's Horse Guards
- Commanding officer, Governor General's Foot Guards
- Commanding officer, the Canadian Grenadier Guards
- Commanding officer, the Queen's Own Rifles of Canada
- Commanding officers of Naval Reserve divisions

Most aides-de-camp wear a gold-pattern aiguillette when acting in their official capacity; however, members of St. John Ambulance Canada wear silver aiguillettes consistent with their other accoutrements as aides-de-camp. All aides-de-camp also wear the cypher or badge of the principal to whom they are appointed. Honorary appointees to the monarch, King Charles III, or the Prince of Wales, wear the appropriate cypher on their uniform epaulette and are entitled to use the post-nominal letters ADC for the duration of their appointment.

Aides-de-camp to the governor general wear the governor general's badge, known as the crest of the arms of Canada, and aides-de-camp to a lieutenant-governor wear the lieutenant-governor's badge (the shield of the province surmounted by a crown). They are appointed from officers of the Canadian Forces. Aides-de-camp to lieutenant-governors are appointed from officers of the Canadian Forces, Royal Canadian Mounted Police and, depending on the province, aides may also be appointed from other uniformed organizations such as municipal or provincial police and emergency services. In certain instances, civilians may be appointed. Non-uniformed civilians do not wear the aiguillette, but do wear their lieutenant-governor's badge as a symbol of their appointment. On 29 November 1973, Governor General Roland Michener concluded his initiative to permit aides-de-camp to the governor general and lieutenant-governors to use the post-nominal letters A de C for the duration of their appointment.

Aides-de-camp to royal and vice-regal personages wear the aiguillette on the right shoulder. Aides-de-camp to all others wear their aiguillette on the left shoulder.

=== India ===
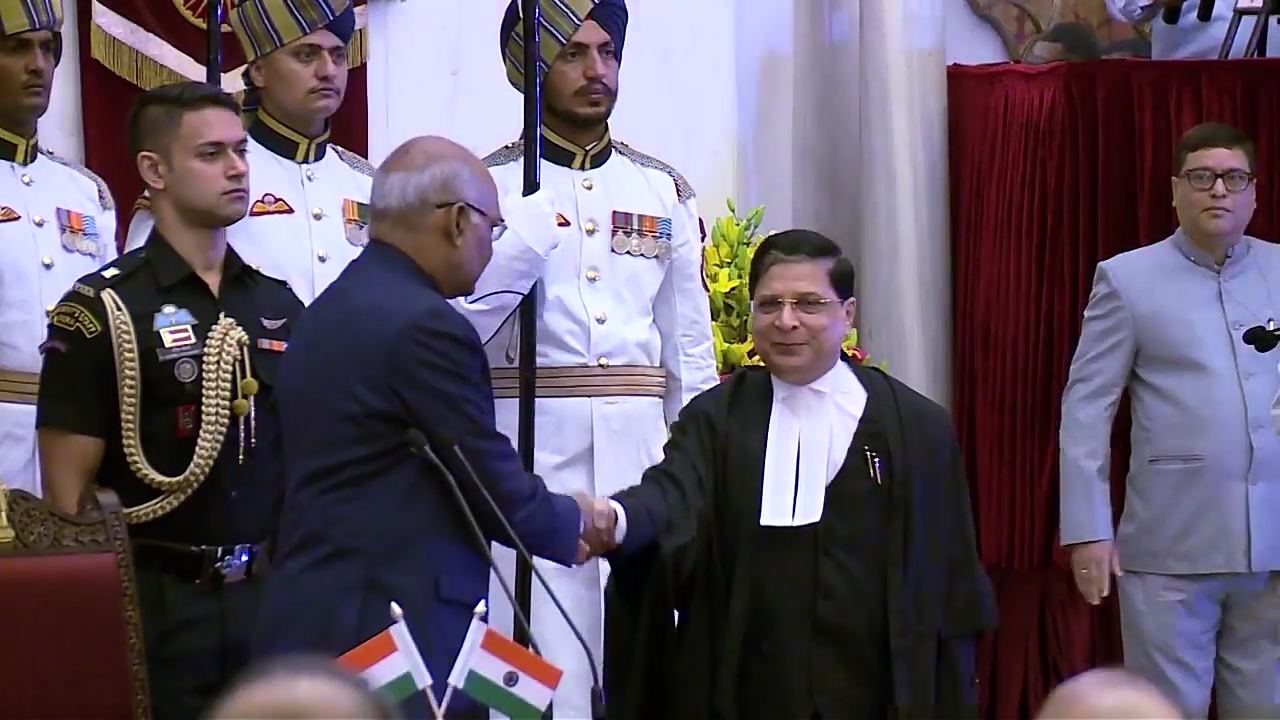
A presidential aide-de-camp to the left of President Ram Nath Kovind, who has just administered the oath of office to Indian Chief Justice Dipak Misra on 28 August 2017

In India, officers of the rank of major general and equivalent and above in the sister services who are in command of divisions or of peacetime commands have aides-de-camp who usually belong to their general's parent regiment/battalion. There have been instances where the sons have served a tenure of aide-de-camp to their fathers. In India, aide-de-camp is a title of honour, and current as well as former aides-de-camp are conferred the post-nominal letters ADC.

The service chiefs, including the chief of the Army, Navy, and Air Staff, usually have three aides-de-camp and the president of India has five aides-de-camp (three from the Army and one each from the Navy and the Air Force). There is also one honorary aide-de-camp from the Territorial Army. The president may appoint any distinguished officer from the armed forces including the service chiefs as honorary aide-de-camp. The governors of the states have two aides-de-camp, one each from the Indian Armed Forces and the Indian and state police services except for the state of Jammu and Kashmir, where both the aides-de-camp to the governor are appointed from the Indian Army.

=== Malaysia ===
An aide-de-camp or adikung as known locally in Malaysia is appointed by the federal government or the state government from officers of the Royal Malaysian Police or from the Malaysian Armed Forces officers comprising the Malaysian Army, Royal Malaysian Air Force or from Royal Malaysian Navy. There were also non-military or police officers who were appointed as aide-de-camp.

=== New Zealand ===
As in other Commonwealth countries where the monarch is head of state, personnel from the New Zealand Defence Force serve as aides-de-camp to royal and vice-regal personages. The governor-general of New Zealand has two full-time aides-de-camp of the rank of army captain, lieutenant RNZN or RNZAF flight lieutenant. Additional and honorary aides-de-camp to the governor-general are of the rank of lieutenant colonel or equivalent. Aiguillettes are of the standard palace No. 1 type and worn on the right shoulder. Equivalent appointments also serve the minister of Defence, the chief of Defence Force and service chiefs. These are usually known as military assistants (MA) personal staff officers (PSOs) or, in the case of the RNZN, flag lieutenant (flags), and wear service-specific No. 2 aiguillettes with coloured flecks (dark blue for navy, red for army and light blue for air force) on the left shoulder.

=== Pakistan ===
In Pakistan, the president, prime minister, and governors have their own aides-de-camp. The aide-de-camp can be from any one of the three Armed Forces and typically are of the rank of captain (army), lieutenant (navy) or flight lieutenant (air force). The aide-de-camp to Justice Khan Habibullah Khan, while he was chief minister and leader of the house of West Pakistan, was his son, a senior bureaucrat, Captain Akhtar Munir Marwat and Captain Gohar Ayub Khan was to his father, President Field Marshal Ayub Khan. The chairman of the Joint Chiefs of Staff Committee and all the three service chiefs are authorised to have an aide-de-camp. In Pakistan, officers of the rank of major general and equivalent and above in the sister services who are in command of divisions or of peacetime commands have aides-de-camp who usually belong to their general's parent regiment/battalion.

=== Papua New Guinea ===
As in other commonwealth realms where the monarch is head of state, the governor-general of Papua New Guinea has two full-time aides-de-camp. One is from the Papua New Guinea Defence Force and one from the Royal Papua New Guinea Constabulary of the ranks of PNGDF captain and RPNGC superintendent.

=== Singapore ===
In Singapore, the president appoints aides-de-camp from the Singapore Armed Forces (SAF), the Singapore Police Force (SPF) and the Singapore Civil Defence Force (SCDF). Selected SAF officers typically hold the rank of major or military expert 5, selected SCDF officers hold the rank of major, and selected SPF officers typically hold the rank of assistant superintendent of police. Both male and female officers may serve as aides-de-camp.

Their duties include assisting in liaison for important guests on behalf of the president and taking care of visiting foreign dignitaries.

=== Sri Lanka ===
In Sri Lanka, the president has an aide-de-camp and an extra aide-de-camp from the three armed services. All general, flag and air officers are entitled to an aide-de-camp, usually selected from their parent regiment or unit. In the navy, an aide-de-camp is called a flag lieutenant. Junior officers (of the rank of major and below) of the armed services who have completed three years of service can be appointed for (extra-regimental) special appointments as an aide-de-camp or extra aide-de-camp for a maximum of three years. Following such appointment, reappointment is not possible for two years. Medical officers of the rank of lieutenant colonel and above can be appointed as honorary physician to the president or honorary surgeon to the president.

The tradition dates back to the office of governor of Ceylon. The governor's staff included an aide-de-camp as a permanent appointment drawing pay from the civil list, usually held by a retired junior officer from a British Army regiment. In addition the governor's staff included the head mudaliyar who served as the native aide-de-camp to the governor on a permanent and honorary (non-paid) basis; as well as several extra aide-de-camp appointed from regiments of the Ceylon Defense Force and later from the Ceylon Royal Naval Volunteer Reserve. With the formation of the office of the Governor-General of Ceylon the practice continued with Ceylon Army officers replacing the British Army officers. At present an officer of the rank of brigadier serves as aide-de-camp to the president, while an officer of the rank of colonel or equivalent serves as aide-de-camp to the defence secretary.

In 1992, two Sri Lankan ADCs were killed in active service, and in 2006 an ADC was severely wounded:

- On 8 August 1992, Major General Denzil Kobbekaduwa (Overall Operations Commander - Northern Sector) and his aide-de-camp Major Nalin S. De Alwis, were killed along with several senior army and navy officers when their Land Rover hit a land mine off Araly Point in Kayts.
- On 16 November 1992, the Commander of the Sri Lanka Navy, Vice Admiral Clancy Fernando and his flag lieutenant, Lieutenant Sandun Gunasekera, were assassinated by a LTTE suicide bomber who drove an explosives laden motorbike into the admiral's staff car in front of the Galle Face Green.
- In 2006, the Commander of the Sri Lanka Army, Lieutenant General Sarath Fonseka, and his aide-de-camp Major Priyal Wickramasinghe were severely wounded in a LTTE suicide bomb attack by a pregnant LTTE operative on the general's staff car inside Army Headquarters.

=== Tanzania ===
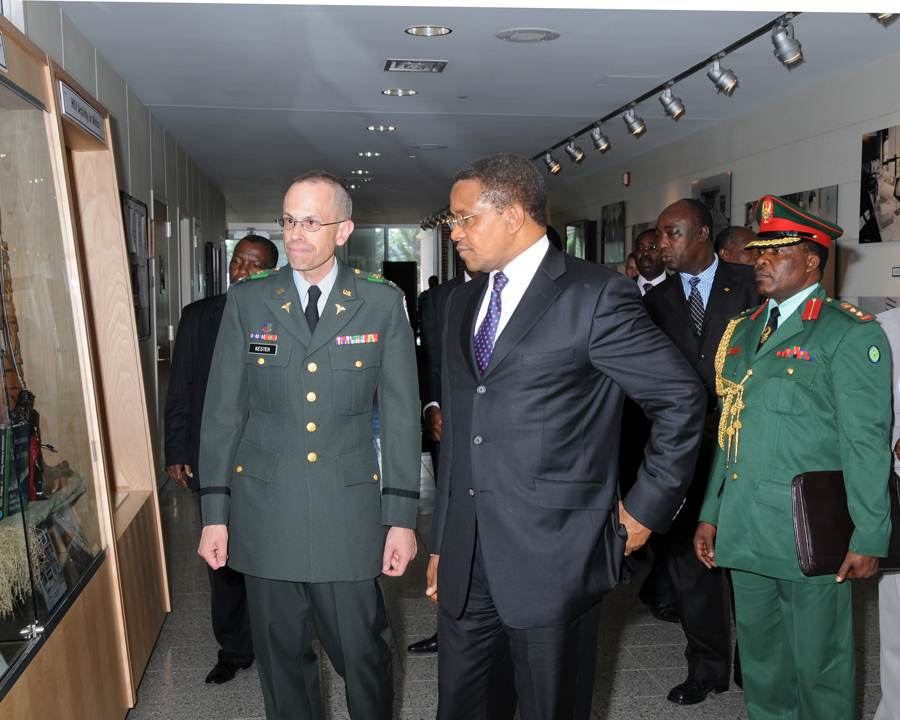
Jakaya Kikwete, president of Tanzania, with his aide-de-camp (right) at Walter Reed Army Research Institute in May 2009

The president of Tanzania has an aide-de-camp from the Tanzania People's Defence Force, with the rank of kanali, which is equivalent to that of a colonel.

=== United Kingdom ===
==== Historic usage ====
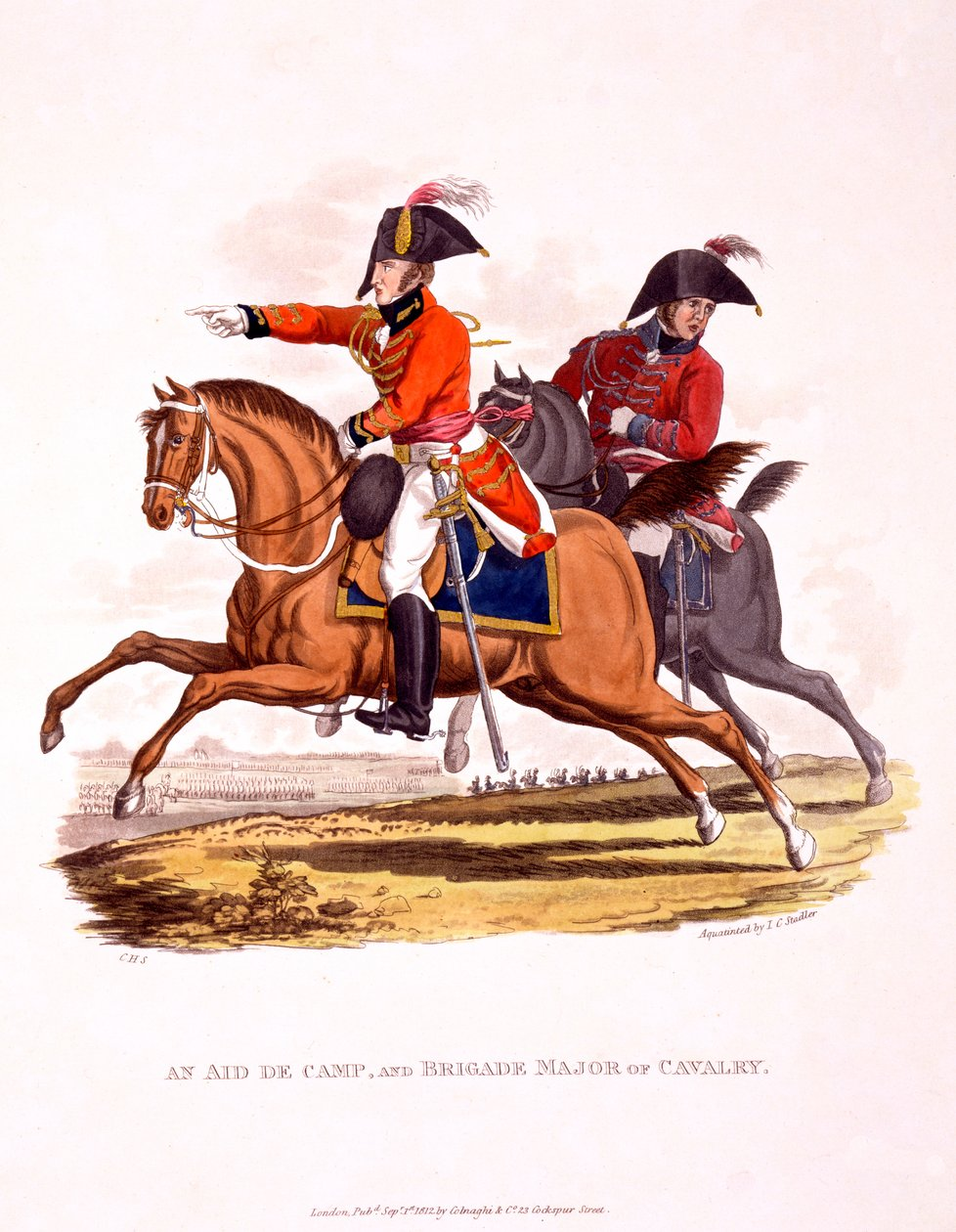
1812 engraving of a British Army aide-de-camp (left)

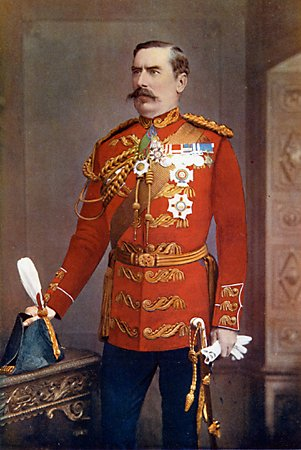
General Sir Baker Russell wearing the full-dress uniform of an aide-de-camp to Queen Victoria

In the United Kingdom, an aide-de-camp (ADC) was defined in 1875 as "a confidential officer attached to the 'personal' or private staff of a general". In the field of battle, he functioned as "the bearer of his chief's written or verbal orders, and when employed as the general's mouthpiece must be implicitly obeyed". In garrison or quarters, however, his duties were more of a social character: "he superintends the general's household, writes and answers invitations, &c." Historically, the appointment pertained only to the Army (in the Navy a flag lieutenant performed equivalent duties: "communicating the admiral's orders to the various ships either personally or by signal").

According to a British military dictionary dating from 1816, an ADC usually held rank equal to, or more senior than, an army captain. "Generals, being field marshals have four [aides-de-camp], lieutenant generals two, [and] major generals one".

The sovereign, as head of the army, was entitled to appoint "an indefinite number of aides-de-camp". Under Queen Victoria, appointments were made (from both the regular Army and the Royal Marines) in recognition of distinguished war service; the appointment at that time carried with it promotion to the rank of full colonel. Additional honorary appointments were made from among the officers of the Militia. Queen Victoria also appointed a number of "naval aides-de-camp" in "compliment to the sister service".

Colonial governors, governors-general and the lord lieutenant of Ireland also appointed aides-de-camp, who had a functional role akin to that of equerries in the Royal Household in which aides-de-camp have a primarily honorific role.

A distinctive and elaborate full dress uniform used to be worn by army aides-de-camp; however, its use was largely discontinued after World War I.

==== Present day ====
In the British Army and the RAF, a junior officer may be appointed to serve as aide-de-camp to a senior officer; the equivalent appointment in the Royal Navy is flag lieutenant. Certain of the monarch's representatives, including lord-lieutenants of counties, may appoint their own aides-de-camp.

===== The Royal Household =====
In addition, a fixed number of senior officers may be appointed as aides-de-camp to the monarch, an appointment which entitles the holder to the post-nominal letters "ADC". Most of these are serving army, navy, and air force officers, usually of colonel or brigadier rank or equivalent. They are seldom called upon individually to perform specific duties; collectively, they walked in procession at every coronation and state funeral of a monarch in the 20th century. In 1991 the aides-de-camp to the queen numbered sixty:

- Eight from the Royal Navy (captains and commodores)
- Three from the Royal Naval Reserve
- One from the Royal Marines (a colonel)
- One from the Royal Marines Reserve
- Eighteen from the Army (brigadiers)
- Sixteen from the Territorial Army (colonels)
- Twelve from the Royal Air Force (air commodore or group captain)
- One from the Royal Auxiliary Air Force or Royal Air Force Volunteer Reserve

There are also, in addition, specific aide-de-camp appointments held by certain very senior officers, including:

- The first and principal naval aide-de-camp
- The flag aide-de-camp
- The aide-de-camp general
- The air aide-de-camp

These are collectively known as the principal aides-de-camp: the first two are individual naval appointments; then, in the reign of Queen Elizabeth II, there were usually up to three aides-de-camp general ("ADC(Gen)") appointed from the senior ranks of the British Army (one of whom was usually the chief of the General Staff); and up to two air aides-de-camp, from among the senior ranks of the RAF (one of whom was usually the chief of the Air Staff).

Principal aides-de-camp, representing the three services, take part along with other members of the Royal Household in the State Processions at State Openings of Parliament, at coronations and at state funerals; and they are occasionally called upon individually to represent the monarch at memorial services and on other occasions.

===== Uniform accoutrements =====
Aides-de-camp, along with equerries, military assistants, military attachés and certain other officers, are distinguished by the addition of aiguillettes to their dress uniforms; these differ in size, colour and position of wear, depending on the appointment. In addition, aides-de-camp to the sovereign wear the monarch's royal cypher on their shoulder straps or shoulder boards in various orders of dress.

In the cases of personal aide-de-camp to the monarch and the principal aides-de-camp, the officers concerned continue to wear the royal cypher after relinquishing the appointment; and if he or she has held the appointment under more than one sovereign then the cypher of each is worn. Otherwise, an officer would cease to wear the accoutrements after their appointment as aide-de-camp is relinquished (with the exception that former aides-de-camp to the sovereign appointed before 1988 may also continue to wear the royal cypher).

== France ==
In France, the president, as commander-in-chief of the French Armed Forces, is served by aides-de-camp. In general, there are three, traditionally including one who is a member of the French Army, and all of whom are lieutenant colonels. In essence, their mission is to transport the briefcase permitting the use of nuclear weapons. They can also provide general assistance to the president: For instance, at times aides-de-camp are seen placing the president's speech on his lectern when he arrives, or holding up cue cards for the president during award ceremonies.

When the president travels, an aide-de-camp often rides in the front passenger seat of the presidential car. He is one of the people who are physically closest to the president.

== Greece ==
The President of the Hellenic Republic as Head of State of the Hellenic Armed Forces is served by aide-de-camp. They have the Hellenic Air Force, Hellenic Navy, and the Hellenic Army.

== Hong Kong ==
The Hong Kong Police Force, the Fire Services Department, the Customs and Excise Department, the Immigration Department, the Government Flying Service, the Civil Aid Service, the Hong Kong Auxiliary Police Force, the Auxiliary Medical Service, the St. John Ambulance Brigade, and the Correctional Services Department each sends an aide-de-camp to the territory's chief executive, which replaced the governor in 1997.

On the last day of British rule in Hong Kong on 30 June 1997, the police aide-de-camp to Governor Chris Patten, presented Patten with the flag at Government House. He then gave the Vice Regal Salute before proceeding, with the Pattens, to leave Government House for the last time.

== Imperial Russia ==
In the 18th-century, under Catherine the Great of Russia, favourites of the Empress were frequently appointed as her aides-de-camp.

During World War I, distinguished officers were appointed as Emperor's aide-de-camp on a rotating basis. In November 1916, future Civil War White Army general Pyotr Wrangel (who was a regiment commander at the time) spent a few days as an aide-de-camp for Nicholas II of Russia.

== Indonesia ==
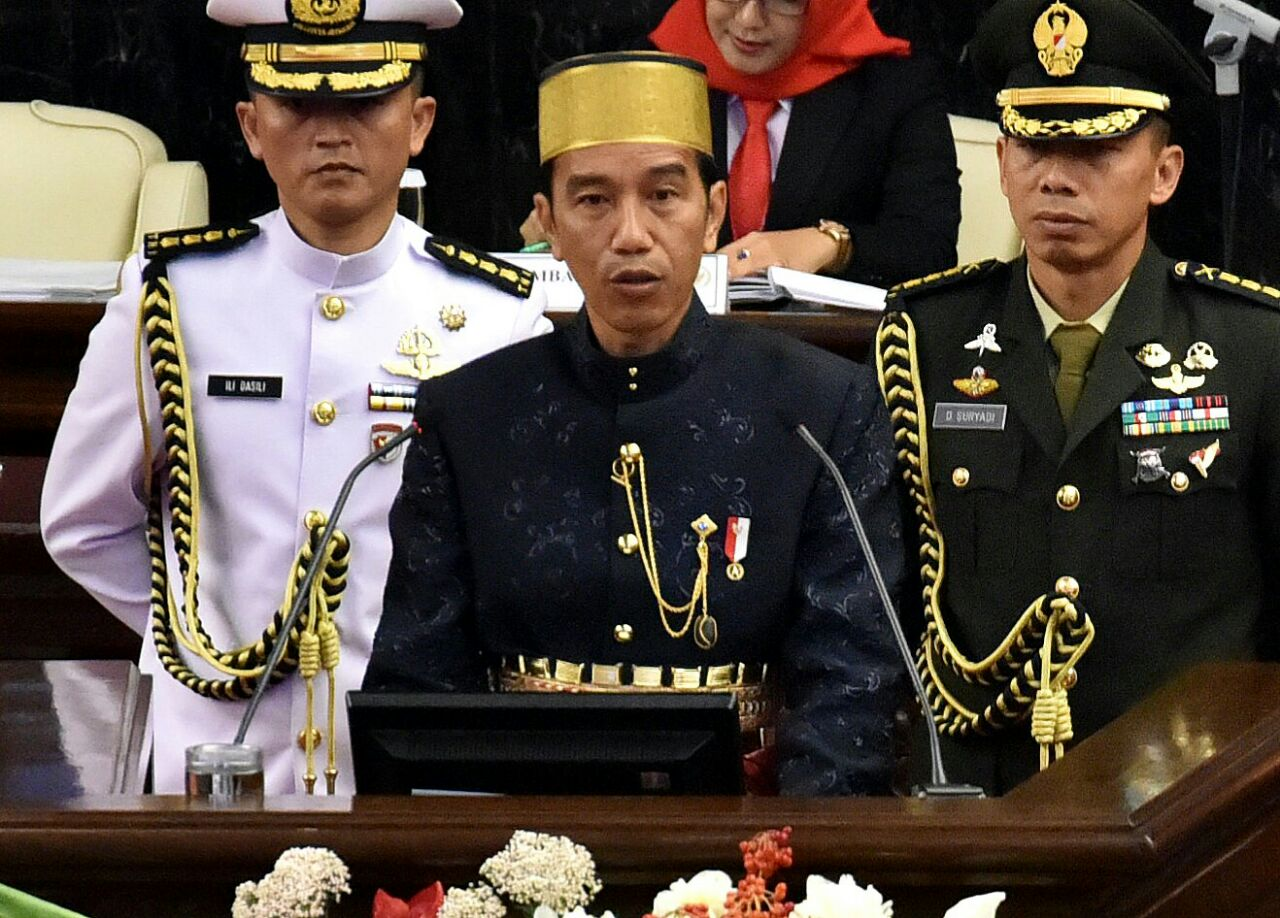
The presidential aide-de-camps behind Indonesian President Joko Widodo during his presidential speech to the Indonesian Parliament, known as the People's Consultative Assembly, in August 2017

In Indonesia, an aide-de-camp, known as an ajudan presiden or "president's adjutant" to the president and vice president of Indonesia is provided by officers from the Indonesian National Armed Forces, with the rank of colonel, and/or the Indonesian National Police, with the rank of Police Chief Commissioner. They are tasked with providing staff support and daily administrative services to the president and vice president as well as to their spouses, either in their official capacities or for personal affairs. They are recognized by their golden aiguillettes.

Other VIPs in Indonesia, such as ministers and other important government officials, are also provided ADCs who are usually junior-ranking officers, such as lieutenants in the military, or police inspectors from the police, who are generally newly graduated from the military and/or police academies. ADCs for regional officials, such as governors and Mayors, known as Regents, are provided ADCs from new graduates of the Institute of Domestic Governance (IPDN).

== Ireland ==
The president of Ireland, as supreme commander of the Irish Defence Forces, is served by aides-de-camp who assist with day-to-day presidential duties, accompany the president on official public engagements in Ireland and on state visits abroad, and represent the president at funerals and on state occasions. There is an ADC on duty 24/7 at Áras an Uachtaráin.

Michael Collins was aide-de-camp and bodyguard to Joseph Plunkett during the Easter Rising in 1916.

== Japan ==
From 1896 until the end of World War II, the emperors of Japan had army and naval aides-de-camp.

== Portugal ==
The president, as commander-in-chief of the Portuguese armed forces, is served by three aides-de-camp, one from the Portuguese Army, one from the Portuguese Navy and one from the Portuguese Air Force. These aides-de-camp integrate the Presidential Military Household. Portuguese aides-de-camp never stay for more than one presidential term, which is five years in duration, after which the return to their respective branches.

== Serbia ==
In the Principality of Serbia and later in the Kingdom of Serbia, the Monarch's Aide-de-Camp held a pivotal position that bridged the monarchy and military affairs. This role encompassed critical responsibilities in national defence, such as advising on military strategy, overseeing the arming and training of the armed forces, and supporting diplomatic engagements. Aides-de-Camp provided invaluable assistance to the monarchy in managing complex and sensitive state and military matters, ensuring smooth coordination with the armed forces. Through their duties, Serbian monarch aides-de-camp embodied royal dignity, led ceremonial functions at court, and stood as enduring symbols of the monarchy’s authority and stability.

== Spain ==
In Spain, the Royal Household has, within the King's Military Chamber or Military Staff, an undetermined number of aides-de-camp, according to Royal Decree 434/1988, of May 6, in its wording given by Royal Decree 772/2015, of August 28. Until 2015, there were 10 aides in the service of the King, as well as an undetermined number for the Prince of Asturias. Since the reform of August 2015, the number of assistants is not specified, although they must have the military ranks of commander or corvette captain (OF-3), lieutenant colonel or frigate captain (OF-4) or colonel or ship-of-the-line captain (OF-5). Likewise, the requirement that the first assistant must have the rank of general (OF-6 or higher) is maintained, since he is also the head of the King's Military Chamber.

As of 2025, the King of Spain has nine aides-de-camp at his service (not counting the first aide): four from the Army, two from the Navy, two from the Air and Space Force and one from the Civil Guard. These take turns 24 hours a day, every day of the year.

== Thailand ==
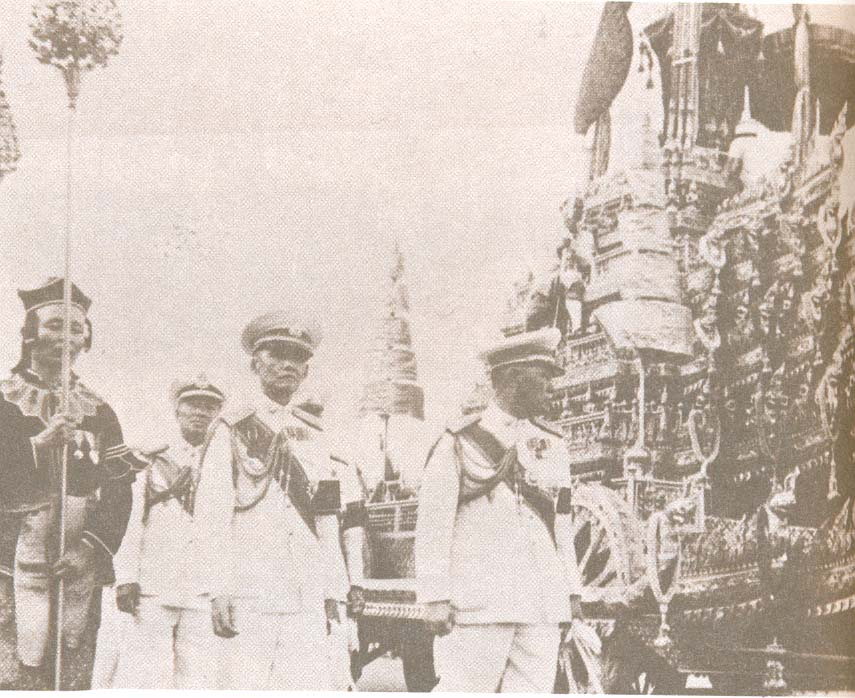
Royal aide-de-camp (centre) in the ceremonial progress for the royal funeral of King Ananda Mahidol of Thailand in March 1950

The Royal Thai Aide-De-Camp Department is a royal service agency under the Office of the Aide-de-Camp. It is responsible for organizing royal appearances and maintaining the safety of the Thai royal family. Royal Thai aides-de-camp are also appointed to senior officers of the Thai Army, Navy, and Air Force. King Chulalongkorn initiated the Royal Guard in 1870, during his visit to Singapore and Indonesia. He had a lieutenant general who served as his aide, who was considered the first Thai aide-de-camp.

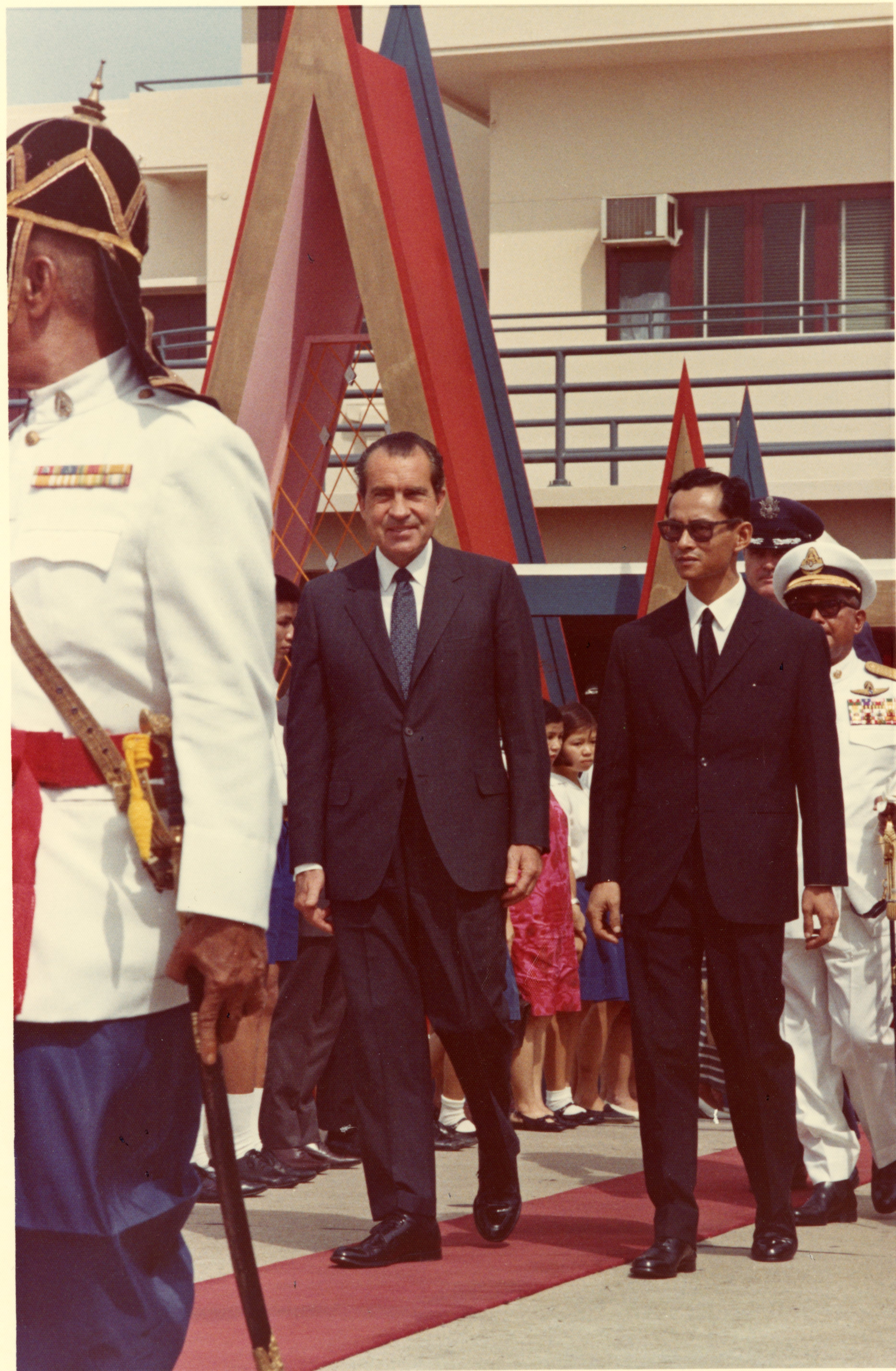
Chief Royal Aide-de-Camp accompanying Bhumibol Adulyadej (hind) and Richard Nixon.

== United States ==
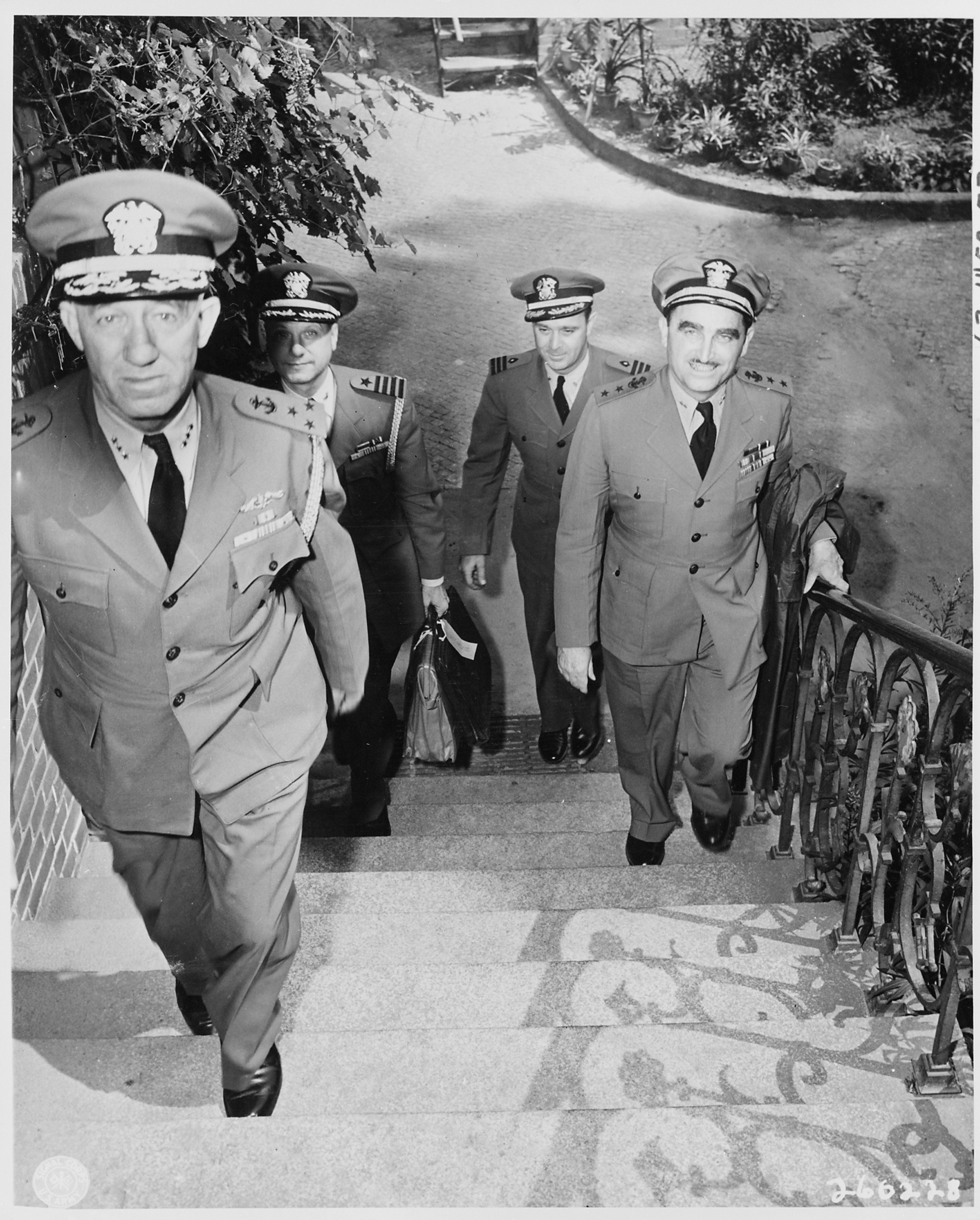
U.S. Navy Captain A. S. McDill (left rear), aide-de-camp to Fleet Admiral Ernest J. King, at the Potsdam Conference in April 1945

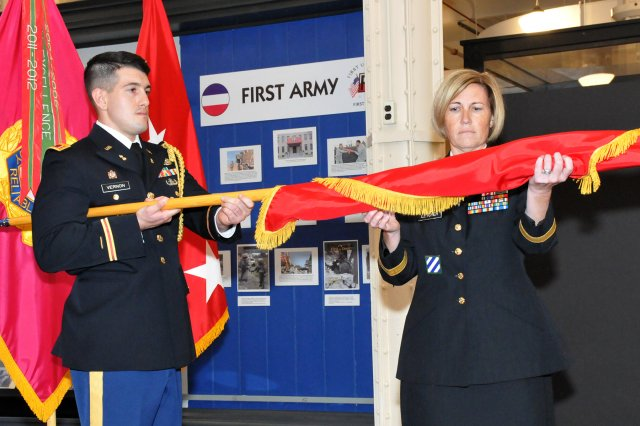
An aide-de-camp holds a brigadier general's flag as a U.S. general unfurls it in March 2020.

Military officers are assigned as aides to the Secretary of the Army, Secretary of Defense, vice president, and president of the United States. For government officials with more than one aide, the senior-ranking aide usually coordinates the activities of the other aides as well as personal attendants such as drivers or orderlies.

The president has six military aides, one from each of the armed services. The president's aides from the Army, Marine Corps, Air Force and Space Force are majors or lieutenant colonels, and the aides from the Navy and Coast Guard are lieutenant commanders or commanders. One of their major roles is to hold the presidential nuclear football. In addition to the six permanent aides-de-camp, there are some 40–45 military social aides holding more junior ranks from lieutenant to major. Their appointment is temporary and part-time, serving for perhaps two to four afternoons a month as required, for social purposes such as gatherings hosted at the White House.

In the United States Army, aides-de-camp are specifically appointed to general-grade officers (NATO Code OF-6 through OF-10). The usual tour of duty for aides is up to two years. Although Congress has authorized general officers to be assigned up to three officer aides, their number and rank being contingent upon the general's grade, Army regulations have traditionally limited each general to a single officer aide. Some generals are also authorized to have enlisted aides on their staff. A general, based on their grade, may choose for an aide-de-camp any commissioned officer up to the following maximum rank:

Brigadier general: first lieutenant
Major general: captain
Lieutenant general: major
General: lieutenant colonel
Chief of staff, U.S. Army: lieutenant colonel, and four authorized enlisted aides
General of the army: lieutenant colonel, and three authorized enlisted aides

Lieutenant colonels and colonels in command of units (battalions and brigades, respectively) do not have aides. Occasionally, the unit's adjutant (S1) will assist the commanding officer as an aide, but this is uncommon. A general of the army does not retire and remains an officer of the United States Army for life, and is entitled to an aide.

U.S. Army aides-de-camp wear a special device in place of the branch-of-service insignia, representing their affiliation with infantry, artillery, or quartermaster, that they would otherwise wear on the lapels of their service uniform. The rank of the general officer being served is indicated on the device worn by the aide-de-camp, as illustrated below. Although the chief of staff of the Army and the chairman of the Joint Chiefs of Staff are O-10 positions, their aides-de-camp wear devices specific to those offices, rather than the normal four-star aide device. Also, an aide-de-camp wears a special aiguillette on the shoulder of their dress uniform.

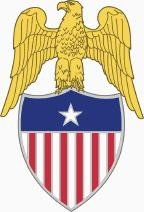
Insignia for an aide to a brigadier general

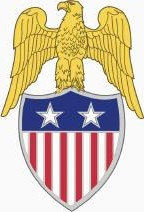
Insignia for an aide to a major general

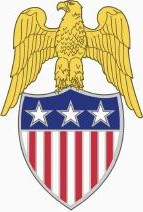
Insignia for an aide to a lieutenant general

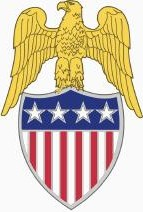
Insignia for an aide to a general

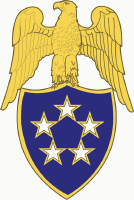
Insignia for an aide to a general of the army (the most recent general of the army retired from active service in 1953)

Insignia for an aide to the vice chief of staff of the army

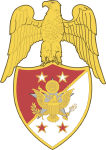
Insignia for an aide to the chief of staff of the army

Insignia for an aide to the under secretary of the army

Insignia for an aide to the secretary of the army

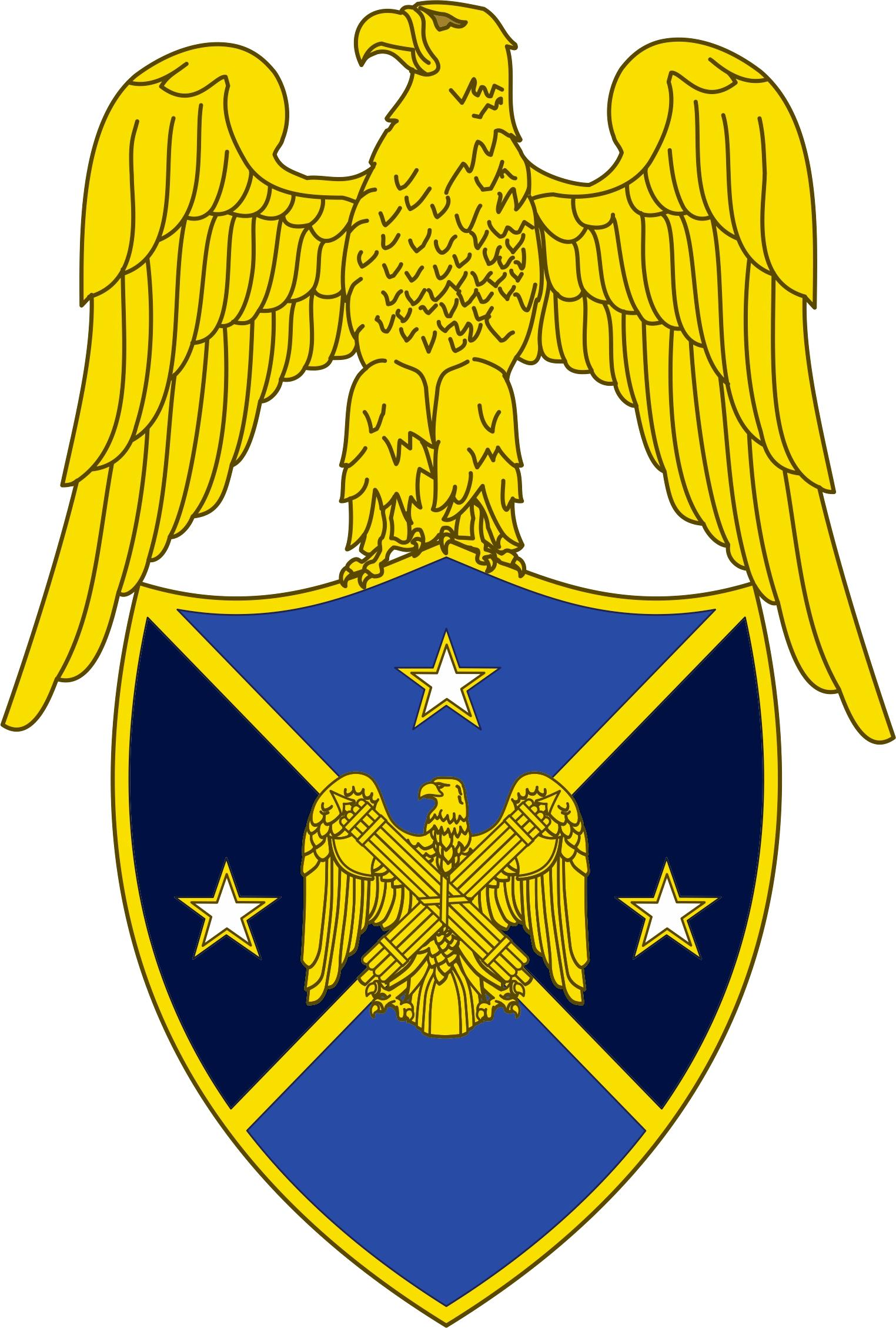
Insignia for an aide to the vice chief of the National Guard Bureau

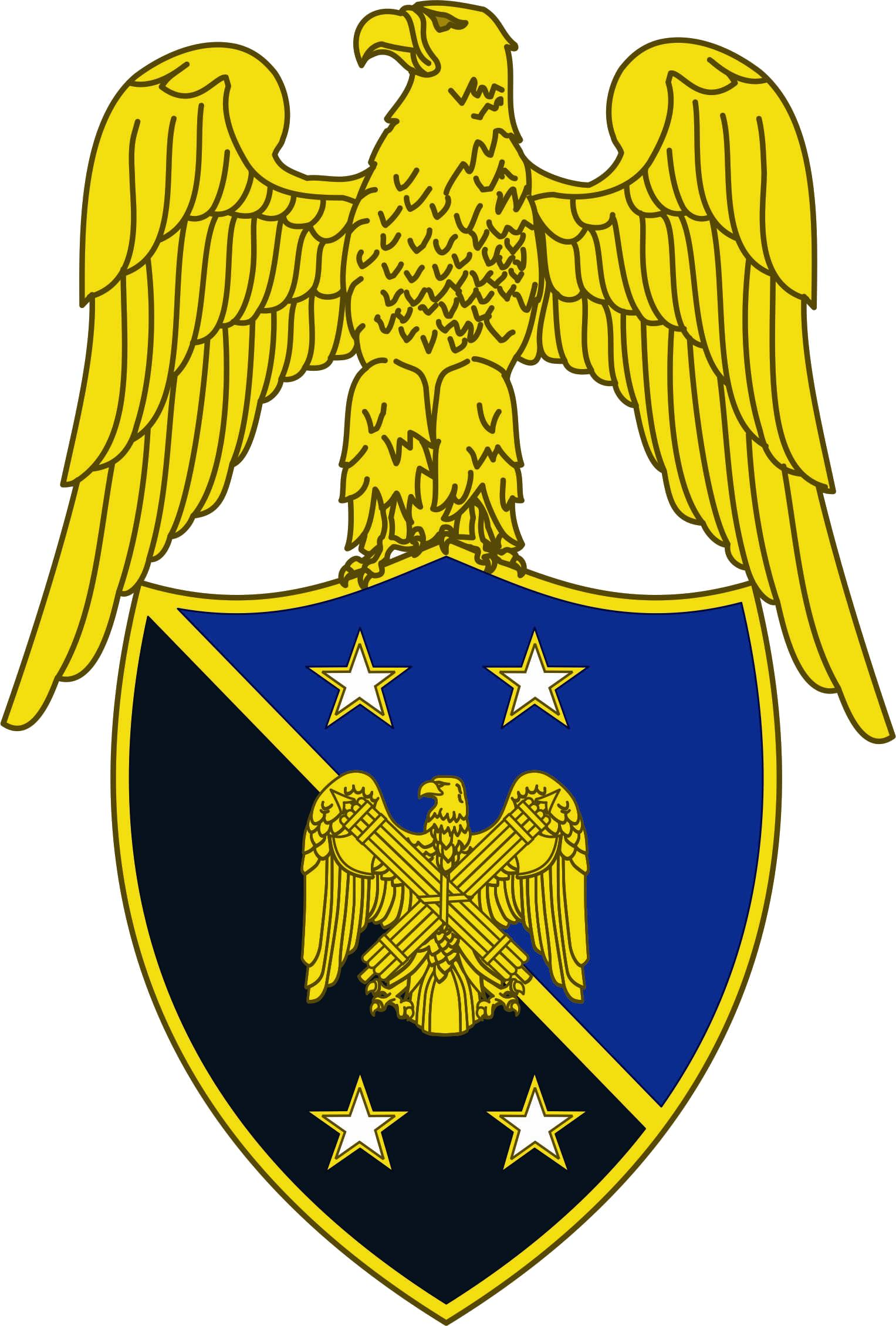
Insignia for an aide to the chief of the National Guard Bureau

Insignia for an aide to the vice chairman of the Joint Chiefs of Staff

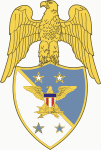
Insignia for an aide to the chairman of the Joint Chiefs of Staff

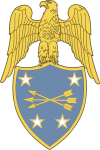
Insignia for an aide to the secretary of Defense

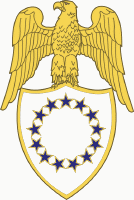
Insignia for an aide to the vice president of the United States

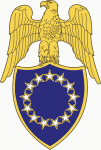
Insignia for an aide to the president of the United States

In the U.S. Navy, the aide-de-camp to an admiral is also known as a "flag aide" (command ashore) or "flag lieutenant" (command afloat).

The highest honor of the U.S. state of Tennessee is "Colonel Aide de Camp". These colonels serve as the personal aides-de-camp to the governor of Tennessee, and their appointments are recorded by the Secretary of State of Tennessee with those who have been commissioned into the State Guard and Tennessee National Guard.

== Variations ==
- Aide-de-camp general
- Aide-de-camp to the emperor of Japan
- Air aide-de-camp
- First and principal naval aide-de-camp
- Flag aide-de-camp
- General's enlisted aide

== See also ==
- Adjutant, a military appointment who assists the commanding officer with unit administration
- Attaché, a similar role in diplomacy
- Batman, a similar role for lesser officers
- Body man, for modern politicians
- Equerry, an attendant who historically held responsibilities for the horses of an officer
- Bernard Schriever, a former aide-de-camp and pilot who was a founder of the United States Space Force
