= Shah Nawaz Khan (judge) =

Pakistani politician

Justice Shah Nawaz Khan was a Pakistani jurist. He was a Mina Khel, Marwat, from Lakki Marwat District, Pakistan.

He served as the Chief Justice of North-West Frontier Province (NWFP) and later remained a judge of the Supreme Court of Pakistan from 5 April 1981 to 1 July 1982. He also remained acting Governor of Khyber Pakhtunkhwa (previously NWFP).

== See also ==
- Marwat
- Khan Habibullah Khan
- Anwar Kamal Khan
