= Anwar Kamal Khan =

Pakistani politician

Anwar Kamal Khan Marwat Mina Khel (Urdu: انور کمال خان مروت مینا خیل; 19 November 1946 – 13 February 2012) was a Pakistani Politician.

He was a senior leader of the Pakistan Muslim League (Nawaz) He was the second son of the three sons of Justice Khan Habibullah Khan and elder brother of a senior Pakistani Civil Servant Akhtar Munir Khan Marwat. He led his first tribal army in 1973. Earlier he has also remained a Senator in addition to being a Senior Provincial Minister.

He was elected as member of the Senate of Pakistan in March 1997 for a six-year term. He served as a member of the Senate Standing Committee on Water and Power and on Local Government and Rural Development and also on Functional Committee on Problems of Less Developed Areas. He was elected to the provincial assembly in the 2002 elections defeating his longstanding rivals the late Pir Khalid Raza Zakori, serving as Pakistan Muslim League (Nawaz) parliamentary leader in the province for nearly five years.

A former opponent of action against the Taliban, after losing the 2008 provincial elections he led his tribe in operation against the Taliban in the Lakki Marwat area.

He died on 13 February 2012 due to two sudden heart attacks at Lady Reading Hospital in Peshawar.
