= Wasim Sajjad =

Acting President of Pakistan in 1993 and 1997–98

- وسیم سجاد
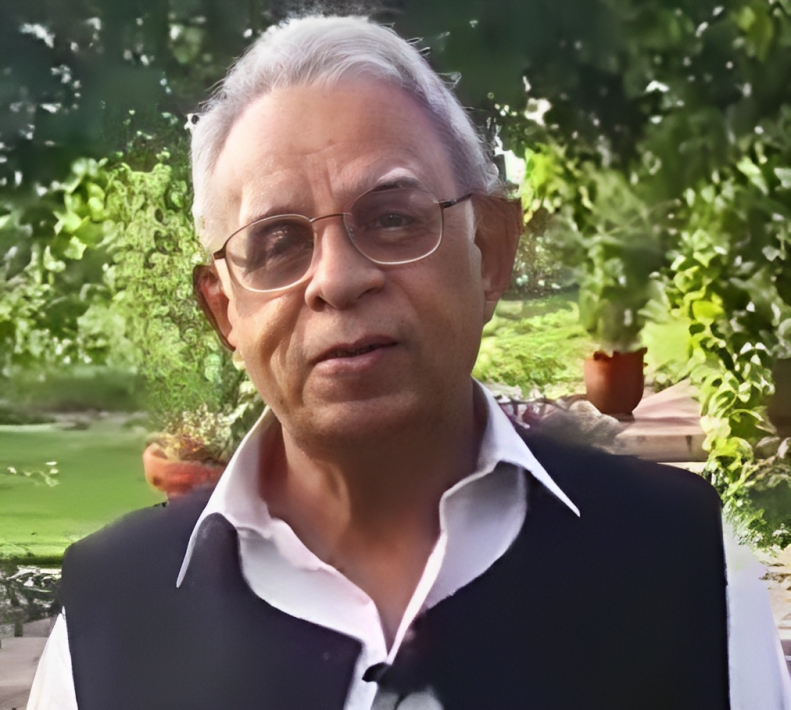
- Sajjad in 2021

President of Pakistan
- In office 2 December 1997 – 1 January 1998
- Prime Minister: Nawaz Sharif
- Preceded by: Farooq Leghari
- Succeeded by: Rafiq Tarar
- In office 18 July 1993 – 14 November 1993
- Prime Minister: Moeenuddin Qureshi (caretaker); Benazir Bhutto
- Preceded by: Ghulam Ishaq Khan
- Succeeded by: Farooq Leghari

3rd Chairman of the Senate
- In office 24 December 1988 – 12 October 1999
- Preceded by: Ghulam Ishaq Khan
- Succeeded by: Mohammad Soomro

Interior Minister of Pakistan
- In office 29 March 1987 – 28 July 1987
- President: Zia-ul-Haq
- Prime Minister: Muhammad Junejo
- Preceded by: Nadir Pervez
- Succeeded by: Aslam Khattak

Law and Justice Minister of Pakistan
- In office 20 September 1986 – 4 December 1988
- President: Zia-ul-Haq
- Prime Minister: Muhammad Junejo
- Preceded by: Aitzaz Ahsan
- Succeeded by: Sharifuddin Pirzada

Personal details
- Born: Wasim Sajjad; 30 March 1941 (age 85) Jalandhar, Punjab, British India (now in Punjab, India)
- Citizenship: Pakistani
- Party: Pakistan Muslim League (Q) (2002–present)
- Other political affiliations: Islami Jamhoori Ittehad; Pakistan Muslim League (N)
- Parent: Sajjad Ahmad Jan (father)
- Education: Army Burn Hall College; Punjab University; Oxford University
- Cabinet: Zia Cabinet
- Website: Senate biography

Wasim Sajjad Jan (Urdu: وسیم سجاد جان; born 30 March 1941) is a Pakistani conservative politician and lawyer who briefly served as the acting president of Pakistan on two occasions and as the Chairman of the Senate in 1988 and 1999.

Born in Jalandhar, British India, Sajjad's father (Justice Sajjad Ahmad Jan) went on to serve as a judge of the Supreme Court, later becoming Chief Election Commissioner of Pakistan. Sajjad studied at the Army Burn Hall before moving to Lahore where he studied law at the Punjab University. As a Rhodes Scholar, he moved to Oxfordshire, where he received his Bachelor of Civil Law followed by a graduate degree in Jurisprudence from the Wadham College, Oxford in 1967. He was called to the Bar at the Inner Temple in 1968. On return to Pakistan, Sajjad was admitted as a lawyer in Pakistan and joined the Punjab Law College where he taught constitutional law between 1967 and 1977.

== Political career ==
Sajjad was elected to the Senate in 1985 as a member of the center-right Muslim League and served as the Minister for Law and Justice from September 1986 to December 1988, when he was elected as Chairman of the Senate where he remained until 1997. During which he served as acting President of Pakistan twice during the general elections. In 1999, Sajjad joined a defecting group that supported General Musharraf's coup and became the Leader of the House in the Senate of Pakistan in 2003, remaining until his political retirement in 2008. After the imposition of the coup by General Pervez Musharraf, Sajjad joined the PML(Q) and again became a senator. This time he served as Leader of the House in the Senate of Pakistan from March 2003 to March 2008. Thereafter he served as Leader of the Opposition from 2010 until 2012. After retiring from politics, he has been serving as Chairman of the Foundation for Advancement of Science and Technology (FAST), and the chancellor of the National University of Computer and Emerging Sciences.

In 2002, Sajjad was accused of misuse of government vehicles and phones, amounting to millions of rupees. He was ordered to pay a fine, but served no time in jail.

== Pakistan Football Federation ==
Sajjad served as interim president of the Pakistan Football Federation in 1989.

== See also ==
- List of Pakistanis
- Chairman of the Senate of Pakistan
- Acting President of Pakistan
- National University of Computer and Emerging Sciences
- Ministry of Interior
