= Pakistani presidential line of succession =

Pakistani presidential orders of succession

The line of succession to the Presidency of Pakistan is the order in which persons may become or act as the President of Pakistan upon the incapacity, resignation or death of an incumbent President. Pakistan, by law, has a parliamentary democratic system of government that has been modified several times since its inception. The prime minister of Pakistan is the head of the government, while the president of Pakistan, by law and by statute, is a constitutional figurehead.

The constitution does not include a position of Vice President, but in absence of president of Pakistan, the Chairman of the Senate of Pakistan acts as the President. If the Chairman, for any reason, is unable to perform the functions of the office of the president, the Speaker of the National Assembly acts as president until a president is elected. The Electoral College of Pakistan (a special session of the parliament, senate and all four provincial assemblies) elects a new president in accordance with Article 41(3) of the constitution. Amendment XVIII, Article 49 of the constitution of Pakistan covers this matter.

== Current order of succession ==
The current presidential line of succession, as specified by the Constitution is:

No.	Office	Incumbent	Party
1	Chairman of the Senate of Pakistan	Yousaf Raza Gillani	PPP
2	Speaker of the National Assembly of Pakistan	Ayaz Sadiq	PML-N

== Succession acts ==
=== Article 49 ===
Chairman or Speaker to act as, or perform functions of, President

- If the office of President becomes vacant by reason of death, resignation or removal of the President the Chairman or, if he is unable to perform the functions of the office of President, the Speaker of the National Assembly shall act as President until a President is elected in accordance with clause (3) of Article 41.
- When the President, by reason of absence from Pakistan or any other cause, is unable to perform his functions, the Chairman or, if he too is absent or unable to perform the functions of the office of President, the Speaker of the National Assembly shall perform the functions of President until the President returns to Pakistan or, as the case may be, resumes his functions.

== Past presidential successions ==
Successor	Party	President	Reason	Date of succession
Ayub Khan (CMLA, CiC Pakistan Army)	Military	Iskander Mirza	Coup d'etat, resignation	27 October 1958, 2 years, 7 months and 4 days days into Ayub Khan's presidency.
Yahya Khan (5th CiC Pakistan Army)	Military	Ayub Khan	Resignation	25 March 1969, 10 years, 4 months and 26 days days into Ayub Khan's presidency.
Zulfikar Ali Bhutto	Pakistan Peoples Party	Yahya Khan	Power handover	20 December 1971, 2 years, 8 months and 25 days days into Yahya Khan's presidency.
Ghulam Ishaq Khan (Chairman Senate)	Independent	Muhammad Zia-ul-Haq	Death	17 August 1988, 9 years, 11 months and 1 day days into Zia's presidency.

== See also ==
- Politics of Pakistan
- Senate of Pakistan
- National Assembly of Pakistan
- President of Pakistan
- Constitution of Pakistan
- Electoral College of Pakistan
