= Executive Committee of the Space Research Council =

Defunct department of Pakistani Government

The Executive Committee of the Space Research Council (denoted as ECSRC) is a defunct institution of the government of Pakistan and was an executive and joint bureaucratic directorate established in 1981. The committee was tasked with formulating and developing guidelines for the Pakistani space program as well as coordinating financial management of the program. The committee was placed under the joint control of the Ministry of Finance led by Ghulam Ishaq Khan and Ministry of Science led by Lieutenant-General Zahid Ali Akbar and officials of the PAEC led by Munir Ahmad Khan. It was established under the executive decree, "Ordinance No. XX" of 1981, which was issued in the Gazette of Pakistan on 21 May 1989, by the President of Pakistan. Since its establishment, approximately 13 meetings of ECSRC were held and headed by the Finance minister. The ECSRC took financial decision of setting the Flight Test Center on Sonmiani Beach as well as managing the financial and scientific development of integrated space programme. The last meeting of the ECSRC was held on 9 September 1999, and it was officially devolved to Space and Upper Atmosphere Research Commission (SUPARCO) and the Nuclear Command Authority, the following year.

On 10 December 2000, the Ministry of Science as government authority issued an "Office Order No. 564", through its notification "No. 2000 Admin-II.". The committee was devolved and transferred from SUPARCO to the National Command Authority (NCA). Its personnel and members were replaced with Development Control Committee (DCC) of NCA.
