= Ghulam Ishaq Khan =

President of Pakistan from 1988 to 1993

- غلام اسحاق خان
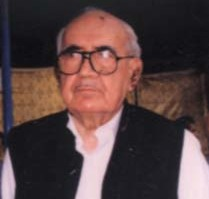

7th President of Pakistan
- In office 17 August 1988 (Note: Acting: 17 August – 12 December 1988) – 18 July 1993
- Prime Minister: Benazir Bhutto; Ghulam Mustafa Jatoi (caretaker); Nawaz Sharif; Balakh Sher Mazari (caretaker); Nawaz Sharif
- Preceded by: Muhammad Zia-ul-Haq
- Succeeded by: Wasim Sajjad (acting)

2nd Chairman of the Senate
- In office 21 March 1985 – 12 December 1988
- Deputy: Sajjad Hussain
- Preceded by: Habibullah Khan
- Succeeded by: Wasim Sajjad

13th Minister of Finance, Revenue & Economic Affairs
- In office 5 July 1977 – 21 March 1985
- President: Fazal Ilahi Chaudhry; Zia-ul-Haq
- Preceded by: Abdul Hafiz Pirzada
- Succeeded by: Mahbub ul Haq

Defence Secretary of Pakistan
- In office 12 October 1975 – 5 July 1977
- Preceded by: Fazal Muqeem Khan
- Succeeded by: Maj-Gen. Ghulam Jilani Khan

6th Governor of the State Bank of Pakistan
- In office 22 December 1971 – 30 November 1975
- Preceded by: Shahkur Durrani
- Succeeded by: S. O. Ali

Personal details
- Born: 20 January 1915 Bannu, North-West Frontier Province, British India
- Died: 27 October 2006 (aged 91) Peshawar, North-West Frontier Province, Pakistan
- Spouse: Begum Shamim Khan
- Children: 5
- Education: University of Peshawar ((BSc) in Chem and Bot.); Civil Services Academy

Ghulam Ishaq Khan (Note: Urdu: غلام اسحاق خان) (20 January 1915 – 27 October 2006), commonly known by his initials GIK, was a Pakistani bureaucrat, politician, and statesman who served as the seventh president of Pakistan from 1988 to 1993. He previously served as chairman of the Senate from 1985 to 1988 under president Muhammad Zia-ul-Haq, and assumed the presidency in accordance with the constitutional line of succession following Zia's death.

Raised in Bannu, Khyber Pakhtunkhwa, Khan graduated from Peshawar University and entered the Indian Civil Service, opting for Pakistan after independence in 1947. Appointed the first chairman of the Water and Power Development Authority by President Ayub Khan in 1961, Ghulam Ishaq also served as Finance Secretary from 1966 to 1970. A year later, he was appointed Governor of the State Bank by President Zulfikar Ali Bhutto, before being made Defence Secretary in 1975, assisting with Pakistan's atomic bomb programme. He was retained by President Zia-ul-Haq as Finance Minister in 1977, overseeing the country's highest GDP growth average. Elected Chairman of the Senate in 1985, Khan was elevated to the presidency after Zia's death in an air crash on 17 August 1988. He was elected president on 13 December, as the consensus candidate of the Islami Jamhoori Ittehad and Pakistan People's Party.

The oldest person to serve as president, Ghulam Ishaq Khan took a hawkish position against Communist Afghanistan, while relations with the United States deteriorated following the Pressler amendment. Domestically, Khan's term faced challenges: ethnic riots flared in Karachi, and Prime Minister Benazir Bhutto accused him of frustrating her government as part of an alliance with conservative opposition leader Nawaz Sharif and the post-Zia military establishment. Khan invoked the Eighth Amendment and dismissed Benazir's government after just 20 months, on charges of rampant corruption and misgovernance. Sharif was elected Prime Minister in 1990, but Khan dismissed his government on similar charges three years later. The Supreme Court overturned the dismissal, but the gridlock ultimately led to both men resigning in 1993.

Retiring from public service, Khan founded and served as rector of the GIK Institute of Engineering Sciences and Technology in his native province. He died from pneumonia in 2006. He is viewed contentiously by Pakistani historians; he is credited with personal austerity, but criticized for wielding an autocratic presidency that ousted two governments.

== Early life and education ==
Ghulam Ishaq Khan was born in Ismail Khel, a rural locality on the outskirts of Bannu District, both villages in the North-West Frontier Province of the British Indian Empire, now Khyber-Pakhtunkhwa Province, Pakistan. He was a Pashtun of the Bangash tribe. His family remains active in politics; his son-in-law is former federal minister Anwar Saifullah Khan while another son-in-law is former Sindh minister and advisor, Irfanullah Khan Marwat. A granddaughter of his, Samar Haroon Bilour, was married to Haroon Bilour of the ANP and another to Omar Ayub Khan, the grandson of former military dictator Ayub Khan and son of politician Gohar Ayub Khan.

After his schooling in Bannu, Khan first attended the Islamia College before making transfer to Peshawar University. He obtained double BSc, in Chemistry and in Botany.

Initially looking for a university job, Khan joined the Indian Civil Service in 1941, serving in various provincial assignments on behalf of British India. After independence in 1947, Khan opted for Pakistan and was assigned to the bureaucracy of the provincial government of North-West Frontier Province in 1947. He took over the provincial secretariat as the secretary of the irrigation department, which he held until 1955.

== Initial public service ==
In 1956, Khan was appointed in the provincial government of Sindh as the Home Secretary, but was later appointed Secretary of Department of Development and Irrigation by the Sindh government. In 1958, he was elevated to federal government level, and assigned to the secretariat control of the Ministry of Agriculture (MoA), an appointment approved by the President Ayub Khan. Since 1958, Khan had been serving on the Board of Governors of the Water and Power Development Authority (WAPDA), before being elevated to chairman in 1961. As Chairman, he played a vital role in the construction and financial development of Mangla Dam and Warsak Dam. In 1966, Khan left the chairmanship to be appointed the Federal Finance Secretary to the Government of Pakistan until 1970, which he relinquished to incoming Prime Minister Zulfikar Ali Bhutto. After Pakistan's loss to India in the Indo-Pakistani War of 1971, Khan was called to administer all retail and commercial services pertaining to the national economy tattered by war. In 1971, Bhutto appointed him Governor of State Bank of Pakistan when he was tasked to formulate and administer monetary and credit policy in accordance with Government policy with influence of socialism. In the latter position, he questioned the wisdom of many of the economic policies of then-Prime Minister Zulfiqar Ali Bhutto who was keen to intensify his nationalization and socialist influence in the financial institutions that marked the slow down of the economy.

== Defence Secretary (1975–77) ==
In 1975, Prime Minister Bhutto transferred him from Governor of the State Bank to the Ministry of Defence as Defence Secretary. It was a fortuitous move in that it brought him into close contact with the Pakistani military establishment and enabled him to closely manage the nuclear weapons program. Though an unusual assignment for a financial expert, this appointment made him a powerful bureaucrat in the country. During that time, Khan became closer to General Zia-ul-Haq and had later coveted for General Zia-ul-Haq's appointment as the chief of army staff.

As Defence Secretary, he helped manage Pakistan's atomic bomb project and had been directly associated with the program. Khan was a vehement supporter of the program and saw it as a "national priority". He backed the advocacy of theorist Abdul Qadeer Khan and helped establishing the Engineering Research Laboratories in Kahuta. He headed the Uranium Coordination Board (UCB) which consisted of AGN Kazi, Munir Ahmad and Agha Shahi. Khan recommended S A Nawab for the Hilal-i-Imtiaz medal in recognition of Nawab's work in establishing Khan Research Laboratories. Later, in the 1980s Khan helped consolidate the efforts at ERL under Lt. Gen. Zahid Ali Akbar as its first military director. He approved the survey by field officer, Brigadier Akbar in 1976. Khan also helped secure the funds for the ERL and lobbying for General Akbar's promotion as the Engineer-in-Chief in 1980. Khan cemented close relations with Dr. Abdul Qadeer Khan and Munir Ahmad Khan, and remained Qadeer Khan's staunch loyal.

His involvement and support earned him the nickname "Mr Nuke" by the U.S. diplomats, while the new media dubbed him as "Baba Atom Bomb". On the contrary, Khan did not have the directorial role in the atomic bomb program until Munir Ahmad Khan retired. However, he maintained complete logistic and operational control over ERL project from the time of its inception using Major General S A Nawab who reported to Ghulam Ishaq at the Ministry of Defence. After Munir Ahmad Khan took retirement from Pakistan Atomic Energy Commission (PAEC), President Ghulam Ishaq Khan eventually consolidated the entire program under the civic-military control, and supervised the classified projects of the program.

== Minister of Finance (1977–85) ==
After Prime Minister Zulfikar Ali Bhutto was ousted in a staged coup d'état in 1977, Khan played a crucial role in the event of stabilizing chief of army staff General Zia-ul-Haq, in Bhutto's capacity. After meeting with the military leadership at the JS HQ, Khan reportedly marked that: "this action was going to harm the country, but since it could not be reversed, they should do their best to salvage whatever they could." He was immediately elevated as Finance Minister by General Zia-ul-Haq, who acted as the Chief Martial Law Administrator (CMLA). A team of economic experts and technocrats were assembled in the management of Khan, giving him the authority over the Planning Commission, Economic Coordination Committee, and Executive Committee of the Space Research Council. Khan worked towards controlling the national economy while harnessing the damaged Private sector. In 1977, Khan endorsed General Haq's bid for becoming the President of Pakistan, who tightened the grip of martial law in the country.

In the 1980s, Khan backed the implementation of the economic Islamization by introducing the risk-free interest rate system as well as establishing the corporatization in the industrial sector. Khan managed the revenue collection and provided the modern shape in the state–owned enterprises (SOEs) that were established in a nationalization in the 1970s. His policies and economic expertise ultimately resulted in the improvement in GDP and GNP progress, helping Pakistan's economy become among the fastest-growing in South Asia.

He maintained his ties with the nuclear society and gave strong priority for the nuclear deterrence as channelling financial funds for the development of the atomic bomb projects. Khan gave tax free status to the Bank of Credit and Commerce International (BCCI). In 1983, Khan was among the invited secret dignitaries who witnessed the first Cold fission test, Kirana-I; along with attendees General Zahid Ali (E-in-C), General KM Arif (COAS), AVM MJ O'Brian (AOC)), and Munir Ahmad (Chair PAEC). In 1984, Khan supported the referendum for Islamization held by President Zia.

== Senate Chairman (1985–88) ==
After the non-partisan general elections held in 1985, Khan was succeeded by Mahbub ul Haq– an economist. Khan decided to participate in the upcoming indirect senate elections as an independent. In 1985, he became the Chairman of the Senate and remained intact in that capacity until 1988.

After the controversial and mysterious aviation accident occurred in Bahawalpur, Khan appeared on national television and announced the death of General Zia-ul-Haq. According to the Constitution of Pakistan, Khan was the second in the line of succession to the President of Pakistan. However, General Mirza Aslam Beg called out for the general elections in 1988. Until the elections, Khan served as an acting president in accordance with the Constitutional rules of succession.

== Presidency (1988–1993) ==
Reaching the mutual understanding with the leftist Pakistan Peoples Party (PPP), Khan participated in presidential elections on a PPP platform. Khan secured 608 votes in the elections, competing against four other candidates; he was also supported by the conservative IDA led by Nawaz Sharif. At the time of assuming the office of president, he became the oldest president of Pakistan.

As president, Khan was marred with political struggle with Prime Minister Benazir Bhutto who attempted for pushing the bill to reverse the Eighth Amendment to the Constitution of Pakistan. Furthermore, Khan was in a conflict with Prime Minister Bhutto in two areas; the appointment of the military chiefs of staff and the Justices of the Supreme Court of Pakistan. Khan consolidated his position in controlling the nuclear deterrence program, keeping all the control over its direction. Problems arose when Prime Minister Bhutto made contact with Munir Ahmad and Abdul Qadeer Khan over the program's direction, which frustrated Khan. Economic growth slowed down and introduction of the US Embargo on Pakistan caused a great economic panic in the country. In the 1990s, Khan and Bhutto failed to arrest the 30% fall in the value of ₨. from 21 to 30 to the US $.

Khan struggled to control the law and order in the country after witnessing the Soviet troops' withdrawal from Afghanistan. Although, he maintained an ally of the United States.

=== Judicial and military appointments ===
Soon after assuming the presidency, President Ghulam Ishaq Khan's conflict arise with Prime Minister Benazir Bhutto's invalid and inappropriate appointments in nation's court system, which were primarily political rather than meeting merit. Many of Benazir government's recommendations for judicial appointments were voided and the judicial appointments made by the President himself became a controversial issue in the nation.

The appointments of chiefs of staff in the command of the military was another issue where the President Khan was in conflict with the Prime Minister Benazir Bhutto in 1989. President Khan also confirmed Admiral Yastur-ul-Haq Malik as the Chief of Naval staff and raised no objections.

Although, President Ghulam Ishaq Khan confirmed the nomination of Admiral Iftikhar Ahmed Sirohey as Chairman joint chiefs and General Mirza Aslam Beg as chief of army staff in 1988, President Khan notably used his presidential powers to retain Admiral Sirohey as Chairman joint chiefs and defused any attempts made by Prime Minister Bhutto for General Beg as the new chairman joint chiefs to control the military.

In 1990, President Ghulam Ishaq Khan reportedly denied the term extension of General Mirza Aslam Beg despite Prime Minister Nawaz Sharif's urging. He also raised objections and further vetoed the appointment of Lieutenant-General Hamid Gul, former DG ISI, as Chief of Army Staff of Pakistan Army. Instead, he favoured appointing General Asif Nawaz as Chief of Army Staff. On the advice of Prime Minister Sharif, he confirmed Air Chief Marshal Farooq Feroze as Chief of Air Staff of Pakistan Air Force.

=== Dismissal of Bhutto and Sharif governments ===
As economic and law and order crises deepened, Khan used the Eighth Amendment to the Constitution of Pakistan to dismiss Prime Minister Benazir Bhutto's government over corruption charges and deteriorating law and order situation and called fresh elections. After holding the general elections in 1993, he supported Nawaz Sharif as the Prime Minister and his IDA government.

Problems with Sharif arose with the issue of reversing the Eighth Amendment when Sharif tried to pass the bill. Eventually, he used the same Amendment to dismiss Sharif's government on similar charges. However, Sharif retaliated by bringing a lawsuit against him in the Supreme Court of Pakistan. President Khan's attempt to use the Eighth Amendment was deemed illegal by the Court and Sharif was reinstated as the Prime Minister. The political deadlock persisted and after the joint intervention of the judiciary and the military, both Khan and Sharif were forced to resign.

== Philanthropy, retirement and death ==
In 1988, Khan founded the Ghulam Ishaq Khan Institute of Engineering Sciences and Technology, which runs programmes in engineering, science and technology. The university was established with the financial support from the BCCI. He invited A Q Khan who took the professorship of physics and delegated Asghar Qadir, a PAEC mathematician, to take professorship in mathematics.

He again negotiated with the PPP for the presidency but eventually dropped as a candidate in favour of Farooq Leghari in general elections held in 1993. He retired from the national politics and avoided contact with international and domestic news media. He died on 27 October 2006, after a bout of pneumonia.

== Notes ==
Political offices
| Preceded by Fazal Muqeem Khan | Defence Secretary of Pakistan; 1975–1977 | Succeeded by Ghulam Jilani Khan |
| Preceded by Abdul Hafiz Pirzada | Minister of Finance; 1977–1985 | Succeeded by Mahbub ul Haq |
| Preceded by Khan Habibullah Khan | Chairman of the Senate; 1985–1988 | Succeeded by Wasim Sajjad |
| Preceded by Muhammad Zia-ul-Haq | President of Pakistan; 1988–1993 | Succeeded by Farooq Leghari |
