= Speaker of the National Assembly of Pakistan =

Presiding officer of the National Assembly of Pakistan

- قومی اسمبلی (Urdu)
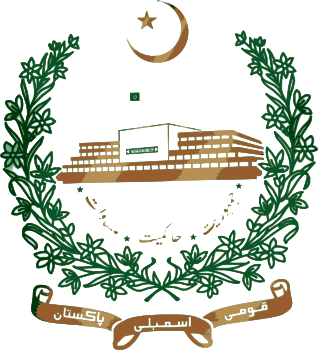

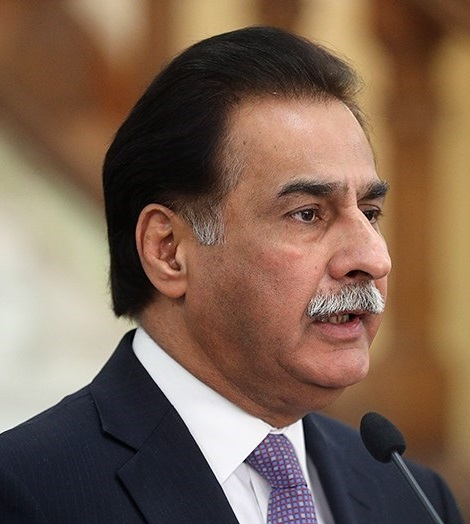
- Incumbent; Ayaz Sadiq since 1 March 2024
- National Assembly of Pakistan
- Style: Mr. Speaker (Informal; while presiding the house); Honourable Speaker (Formal)
- Status: Presiding officer
- Seat: Parliament House, Islamabad
- Nominator: Political parties
- Appointer: Elected by the National Assembly
- Term length: As long as the current assembly remains in power, the Speaker continues to exercise its authority (usually 5 years)
- Formation: Constitution of Pakistan (12 April 1973)
- First holder: Muhammad Ali Jinnah (11 August 1947)
- Succession: Second
- Website: Speaker National Assembly

The Speaker of the National Assembly (Urdu: اسپیکر قومی اسمبلی, romanized: Ispīkar Qaumī Assamblī) is the presiding official of the National Assembly of Pakistan, the lower house of the Parliament of Pakistan.

The office has its roots in 1947 and was reestablished in 1973 in accordance to the Constitution; the speaker presides over the chamber composed of people's representatives elected on the basis of universal franchise. The Speaker is Second in the line of succession to the President of Pakistan and occupies fourth position in the Warrant of Precedence, after the President, the Prime Minister and the Chairman of Senate. In addition, the Speaker is the spokesman of the National Assembly to the outside world, and is non-partisan in his approach.

To exercise the great authority that stems from the respect, affection and consideration which every Member of the House bestows upon the holder of this high office, the Speaker shows complete impartiality in the discharge of their functions. The speakers continues to serve until a new speaker is elected when the National Assembly dissolves.

== Role and responsibilities ==
The office of Speaker of the National Assembly is created by Article 53 of the Chapter 2 in Part III of the Constitution of Pakistan:

After a general election, the National Assembly shall, at its first meeting and to the exclusion of any other business, elect from amongst its members a Speaker and a Deputy Speaker and, so often as the office of Speaker or Deputy Speaker becomes vacant, the Assembly shall elect another member as Speaker or, as the case may be, Deputy Speaker.

— Article 53(1)–53(2) of the Chapter 2: The Parliament: in Part III of the Constitution of Pakistan, source

The Speakership of the National Assembly is a leadership position and the office-holder actively works to set the majority party's legislative agenda. The Speaker usually does not personally preside over debates, instead delegating the duty to members of the House from the majority party. The Speaker usually does not participate in debate and rarely votes.

== History ==
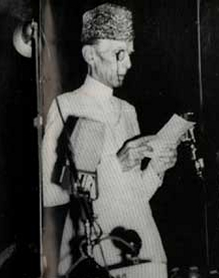
Jinnah addressing the first Constituent Assembly on 14 August 1947.

The first speaker/president of the National Assembly of Pakistan, Muhammad Ali Jinnah, was elected unanimously by the Constituent Assembly of Pakistan on 11 August 1947. He served from 11 August until his death on 11 September 1948. The deputy president of the Constituent Assembly, Maulvi Tamizuddin Khan was then elected president who served two separate terms in that capacity. Only two speakers in the history of Pakistan have gone on to become prime ministers, Zulfikar Ali Bhutto who served as speaker from 14 April 1972 to 15 August 1972 and Yousaf Raza Gillani who served from 17 October 1993 to 16 February 1997. Raja Pervaiz Ashraf, the incumbent speaker, previously served as prime minister from 2012 to 2013.

== List of speakers ==
List of speakers of the National Assembly

These are the names of speakers and presidents of the National Assembly of Pakistan.

Muslim League/Convention Muslim League

Pakistan Muslim League/IJI/Pakistan Muslim League (N)

PML (Q)

Pakistan Peoples Party

Pakistan Tehreek-e-Insaf

List of speakers of the National Assembly
N	Photo	Speaker	Time duration	Party	Province
1		Muhammad Ali Jinnah	11 August 1947 – 11 September 1948	Muslim League	Sindh
–		Tamizuddin Khan(Acting)	14 December 1948 – 24 October 1954	Muslim League	East-Bengal
2		Abdul Wahab Khan	12 August 1955 – 7 October 1958	Muslim League	East-Bengal
–		Tamizuddin Khan(Acting)	11 June 1962 – 19 August 1963	Muslim League	East-Bengal
3		Fazlul Quader Chowdhury	29 November 1963 – 12 June 1965	CML	East-Bengal
4		Abdul Jabbar Khan	12 June 1965 – 25 March 1969	CML	East-Bengal
5		Zulfikar Ali Bhutto	14 April 1972 – 15 August 1972	Pakistan Peoples Party	Sindh
6		Fazal Ilahi	15 August 1972 – 9 August 1973	Pakistan Peoples Party	Punjab
7		Farooq Ali	9 August 1973 – 27 March 1977	Pakistan Peoples Party	Punjab
8		Malik Meraj Khalid	27 March 1977 – 5 July 1977	Pakistan Peoples Party	Punjab
9		Fakhar Imam	22 March 1985 – 26 May 1986	Pakistan Muslim League	Punjab
10		Hamid Nasir	31 May 1986 – 3 December 1988	Pakistan Muslim League	Punjab
11		Malik Meraj Khalid	3 December 1988 – 4 November 1990	Pakistan Peoples Party	Punjab
12		Gohar Ayub	4 November 1990 – 17 October 1993	Muslim League (N)/IJI	Khyber-Pakhtunkhwa
13		Yousaf Raza Gillani	17 October 1993 – 16 February 1997	Pakistan Peoples Party	Punjab
14		Elahi Bux Soomro	16 February 1997 – 20 August 2001	Pakistan Muslim League (N)	Sindh
15		Amir Hussain	19 November 2002 – 19 March 2008	Pakistan Muslim League (Q)	Punjab
16		Fahmida Mirza	19 March 2008 – 3 June 2013	Pakistan Peoples Party	Sindh
17		Ayaz Sadiq	3 June 2013 – 22 August 2015	Pakistan Muslim League (N)	Punjab
_		Murtaza Javed Abbasi (Acting)	24 August 2015 – 9 November 2015	Pakistan Muslim League (N)	Khyber-Pakhtunkhwa
17		Ayaz Sadiq	9 November 2015 – 15 August 2018	Pakistan Muslim League (N)	Punjab
18		Asad Qaiser	15 August 2018 – 10 April 2022	Pakistan Tehreek-e-Insaf	Khyber Pakhtunkhwa
_		Qasim Suri (Acting)	10 April 2022 – 16 April 2022	Pakistan Tehreek-e-Insaf	Balochistan
19		Raja Pervaiz Ashraf	16 April 2022 – 1 March 2024	Pakistan Peoples Party	Punjab
20		Ayaz Sadiq	1 March 2024 – Incumbent	Pakistan Muslim League (N)	Punjab

== See also ==
- List of Speakers of the West Pakistan Legislative Assembly
- Senate of Pakistan
- Politics of Pakistan
- Prime Minister of Pakistan
- Finance Minister of Pakistan
- Constitution of Pakistan
