= Habibullah Khan Marwat =

Pakistani politician

Habibullah Khan
- خان حبیب اللہ خان
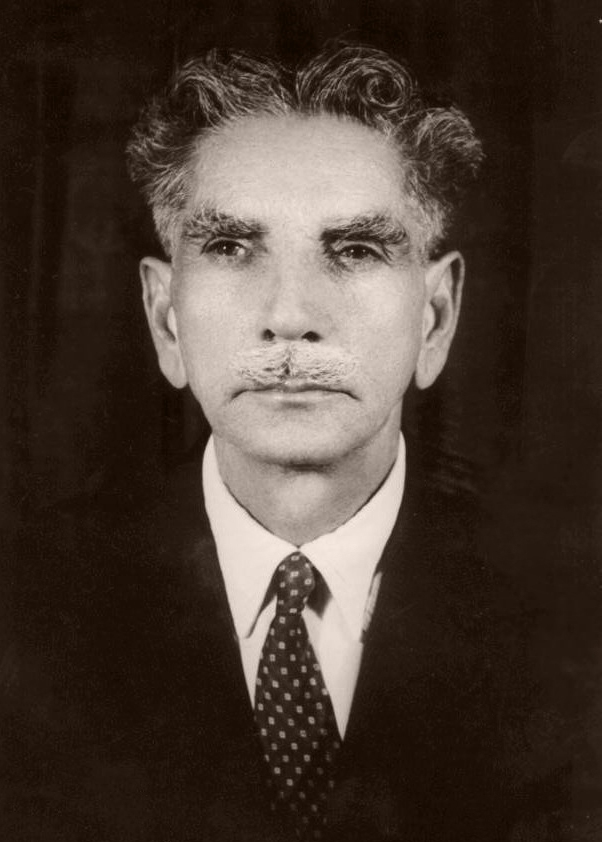

1st Chairman of the Senate of Pakistan
- In office 6 August 1973 – 4 July 1977
- Deputy: Abdul Malik Baloch
- Preceded by: Position established
- Succeeded by: Ghulam Ishaq Khan

Minister of Interior
- In office 13 June 1962 – 23 March 1965
- President: Ayub Khan
- Preceded by: Zakir Husain
- Succeeded by: Ayub Khan

Acting President of Pakistan
- In office 1977–1978
- Preceded by: Fazal Ilahi Chaudhry
- Succeeded by: Zia-ul-Haq

Personal details
- Born: 14 October 1901 Aligarh, British Raj (now India)
- Died: 5 December 1978 (aged 77) Peshawar, Pakistan
- Party: Pakistan Peoples Party
- Education: Aligarh Muslim University

Habibullah Khan (Urdu: حبیب اللہ خان), also known as Habibullah Khan Marwat, (Urdu: حبیب اللہ خان مروت; 14 October 1901 – 5 December 1978) was the 1st Chairman of the Senate of Pakistan and a former Peshawar High Court judge. He also served as Interior Minister of Pakistan during Ayub Khan's regime before serving two terms as Chairman of the Senate of Pakistan during Zulfikar Ali Bhutto's administration. In 1937, Habibullah Khan joined the Khaksar movement and worked in the North West Frontier Province.

== Career ==
Habibullah Khan graduated from Aligarh Muslim University in 1926. He was one of the leading lawyers in the region mostly practicing criminal cases in the then District Headquarters in Bannu. He lived in Bannu for his legal practice and occasionally returned to his family home in Lakki Marwat. A street still exists in the name of Habibullah Khan in Bannu City where he then resided. He remained elected legislator of the first legislative council of then-North West Frontier Province from 1932 to 1946. Upon the partition of India in 1947, Habibullah Khan opted for a career in law and became the first District and Sessions Judge of Peshawar High Court in 1947. He was elevated to the position of judge of the Peshawar High Court in 1956 and remained in that position until 1961.

Habibullah Khan started his political career when he won elections in 1962 and was appointed the Interior Minister of Pakistan when General Ayub Khan was formally declared President. He continued in this post until 1965, when Ayub Khan himself took the portfolio of Interior Minister, then known as Home Affairs Minister. Habibullah Khan was appointed the chief Minister of then-West Pakistan located in Lahore (being the leader of the House in the West Pakistan Assembly). He remained as Chief Minister from 1965 to 1967, and resigned after developing political differences. Habibullah Khan was the first Chairman of the Senate of Pakistan from 6 August 1973 until 5 August 1975, and was consecutively elected chairman for the second term of the Senate from 6 August 1975 until 4 July 1977. He remained acting President of Pakistan from 1977 until 1978, when martial law was imposed on the country by General Muhammad Zia-ul-Haq.

== See also ==
- Shah Nawaz Khan (Chief Justice)
- Marwat

Political offices
Preceded by Zakir Husain	Minister of the Interior; 1962–1965	Succeeded by Ayub Khan
New office	Chairman of the Senate; 1973–1977	Succeeded by Ghulam Ishaq Khan
