= 2003 Pakistani Senate election =

Election for the Senate of Pakistan in 2003

- 24 & 27 February 2003

All 100 seats in the Senate of Pakistan
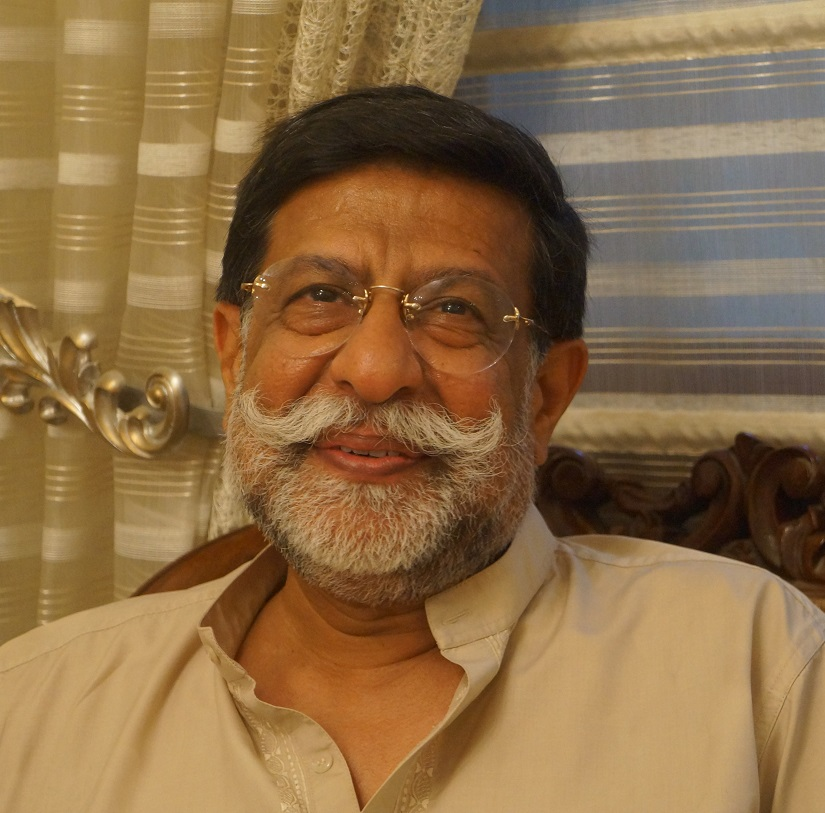

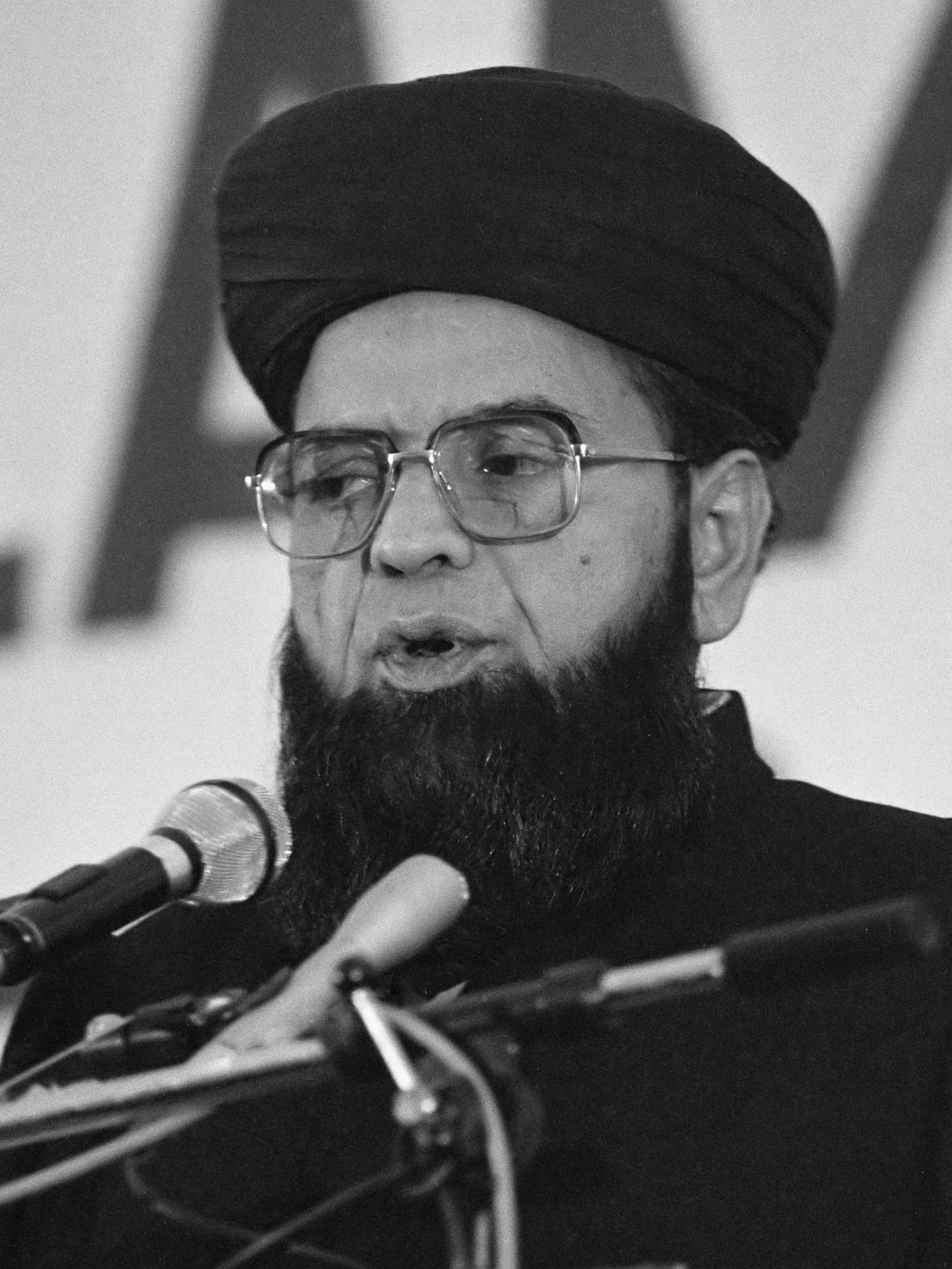
| | Majority party | Minority party |
|---|---|---|
| Leader | Muhammad Mian Soomro | Shah Ahmad Noorani |
| Party | PML(Q) | MMA |
| Seats won | 35 | 19 |
Chairman before election
Wasim Sajjad
PML(N)
Elected Chairman
Muhammad Mian Soomro
PML(Q)

Senate elections were held in Pakistan on 24 & 27 February 2003. All 100 seats in the Senate were up for election with half of the winning candidates serving six-year terms, and the other half serving three-year terms.

In Punjab, Sindh, NWFP, and Balochistan, the election was held on 24 February, while in FATA and Islamabad, it was held on 27 February.

== Results ==
Results of the 2003 Pakistani Senate election
| Party | Administrative division | | | | | | Total |
| Party | Punjab | Sindh | NWFP | Balochistan | FATA | ICT | Total |
|---|---|---|---|---|---|---|---|
| PML(Q) | 16 | 5 | 2 | 9 | 0 | 3 | 35 |
| MMA | 0 | 1 | 11 | 6 | 0 | 1 | 19 |
| PPP | 3 | 7 | 2 | 0 | 0 | 0 | 12 |
| MQM | 0 | 6 | 0 | 0 | 0 | 0 | 6 |
| PML(N) | 3 | 0 | 1 | 0 | 0 | 0 | 4 |
| ANP | 0 | 0 | 2 | 0 | 0 | 0 | 2 |
| NA | 0 | 1 | 0 | 1 | 0 | 0 | 2 |
| PMAP | 0 | 0 | 0 | 2 | 0 | 0 | 2 |
| BNM | 0 | 0 | 0 | 1 | 0 | 0 | 1 |
| BNP | 0 | 0 | 0 | 1 | 0 | 0 | 1 |
| BNP(A) | 0 | 0 | 0 | 1 | 0 | 0 | 1 |
| JWP | 0 | 0 | 0 | 1 | 0 | 0 | 1 |
| PML(F) | 0 | 1 | 0 | 0 | 0 | 0 | 1 |
| PPP(S) | 0 | 0 | 1 | 0 | 0 | 0 | 1 |
| Independent | 0 | 1 | 3 | 0 | 8 | 0 | 12 |
| Total | 22 | 22 | 22 | 22 | 8 | 4 | 100 |

=== Winning candidates by administrative division ===
Below are the candidates who won the election, by administrative division.

Punjab
| Seat Type | Winners | | | | | | |
|---|---|---|---|---|---|---|---|
| General | Shaukat Aziz (PML-Q) | Javed Ashraf Qazi (PML-Q) | Tariq Azim Khan (PML-Q) | Kamil Ali Agha (PML-Q) | Syed Dilawar Abbas (PML-Q) | Muhammad Ali Durrani (PML-Q) | Naeem Hussain Chattha (PML-Q) |
| General | Mohammad Amjad Abbas (PML-Q) | Asif Akhtar Hashmi (PML-Q) | Zafar Iqbal Chaudhry (PML-Q) | Syed Sajjad Bokhari (PPP) | Latif Khosa (PPP) | Ishaq Dar (PML-N) | Sajid Mir (PML-N) |
| Technocrat | Syed Muhammad Zafar (PML-Q) | | Khalid Ranjha (PML-Q) | | Anwar Bhinder (PML-Q) | | Mohammad Akbar Khawaja (PPP) |
| Women | Gulshan Saeed (PML-Q) | Razina Alam Khan (PML-Q) | | Nighat Agha (PML-Q) | | Saadia Abbasi (PML-Q) | |

Sindh
| Seat Type | Winners | | | | | | |
|---|---|---|---|---|---|---|---|
| General | Safdar Ali Abbasi (PPP) | Raza Rabbani (PPP) | Abdullah Riar (PPP) | Abdul Latif Ansari (PPP) | Enver Baig (PPP) | Babar Khan Ghauri (MQM) | Abbas Kumaili (MQM) |
| General | Ahmad Ali (MQM) | Muhammad Mian Soomro (PML-Q) | Abdul Hafeez Shaikh (PML-Q) | Shah Ahmad Noorani (MMA) | Asif Jatoi (NA) | Abdul Razak Thaheem (PML-F) | Muhammad Amin Dadabhoy (Independent) |
| Technocrat | Nisar Memon (PML-Q) | | Tanvir Khalid (PML-Q) | | Farooq Naek (PPP) | | Muhammad Saeed Siddiqui (MQM) |
| Women | Abida Saif (MQM) | Nighat Mirza (MQM) | | Rukhsana Zuberi (PPP) | | Bibi Yasmeen Shah (PML-Q) | |

NWFP
| Seat Type | Winners | | | | | | |
|---|---|---|---|---|---|---|---|
| General | Khurshid Ahmad (MMA) | Murad Ali Shah (MMA) | Hidayat Khan (MMA) | Gul Naseeb Khan (MMA) | Rahat Hussain (MMA) | Sahibzada Khalid Jan (MMA) | Muhammad Ibrahim Khan (MMA) |
| General | Asfandyar Wali Khan (ANP) | Khalilur Rehman (PML-Q) | Mehtab Abbasi (PML-N) | Shuja-ul-Mulk (PPP-S) | Gulzar Ahmed Khan (Independent) | Waqar Ahmed Khan (Independent) | Azam Swati (Independent) |
| Technocrat | Sami-ul-Haq (MMA) | | Muhammad Saeed (MMA) | | Ilyas Ahmed Bilour (ANP) | | Farhatullah Babar (PPP) |
| Women | Kausar Firdous (MMA) | Mumtaz Bibi (MMA) | | Fauzia Fakhar-uz-Zaman Khan (PML-Q) | | Anisa Zeb Tahirkheli (PPP) | |

Balochistan
| Seat Type | Winners | | | | | | |
|---|---|---|---|---|---|---|---|
| General | Mir Wali Muhammad Badini (PML-Q) | Muhammad Sarwar Khan (PML-Q) | Muhammad Naseer Mengal (PML-Q) | Ayaz Mandokhel (PML-Q) | Muhammad Akram (PML-Q) | Azizullah Satakzai (MMA) | Muhammad Ismail Buledi (MMA) |
| General | Rehmatullah Kakar (MMA) | Liaqat Ali Bangulzai (MMA) | Nawab Ayaz Jogezai (PMAP) | Raza Muhammad Raza (PMAP) | Muhammad Aslam Buledi (BNM) | Sanaullah Baloch (BNP) | Mohim Khan Baloch (BNP-A) |
| Technocrat | Kamran Murtaza (MMA) | | Agha Muhammad (MMA) | | Saeed Ahmed Hashmi (PML-Q) | | Amanullah Kanrani (JWP) |
| Women | Roshan Khursheed Bharucha (PML-Q) | Kalsoom Perveen (PML-Q) | | Agha Pari Gul (PML-Q) | | Shereen Noor (NA) | |

FATA
| Seat Type | Winners | | | | | | | |
|---|---|---|---|---|---|---|---|---|
| General | Malik Rashid Ahmed Khan (Independent) | Hameed Ullah Jan Afridi (Independent) | Hafiz Abdul Malik Qadri (Independent) | Syed Sajjad Hussain Mian (Independent) | Syed Muhammad Hussain (Independent) | Tahir Iqbal Orakzai (Independent) | Mateen Shah (Independent) | Muhammad Ajmal Khan (Independent) |

ICT
| Seat Type | Winners | |
|---|---|---|
| General | Mushahid Hussain (PML-Q) | Abdul Ghafoor Ahmed (MMA) |
| Technocrat | Wasim Sajjad (PML-Q) | |
| Women | Tahira Latif (PML-Q) | |

== Aftermath ==
After the election, on 12 March 2003, Muhammad Mian Soomro of the ruling Pakistan Muslim League (Q) (PML(Q)) was elected to the position of Chairman, unopposed, replacing Wasim Sajjad of the Pakistan Muslim League (N) (PML(N)). On the same day, Khalilur Rehman, also of the PML(Q), was elected to the position of Deputy Chairman, also unopposed, replacing Mir Humayun Khan Marri of the Jamhoori Wattan Party (JWP). Moreover, on 27 March, Wasim Sajjad, who had switched to the PML(Q), was appointed as the Leader of the House, whereas the position of Leader of the Opposition remained vacant until 10 January 2005, when Raza Rabbani of the Pakistan People's Party (PPP) was appointed to the slot.
