= 2006 Pakistani Senate election =

- 6 & 10 March 2006

50 of the 100 seats in the Senate of Pakistan
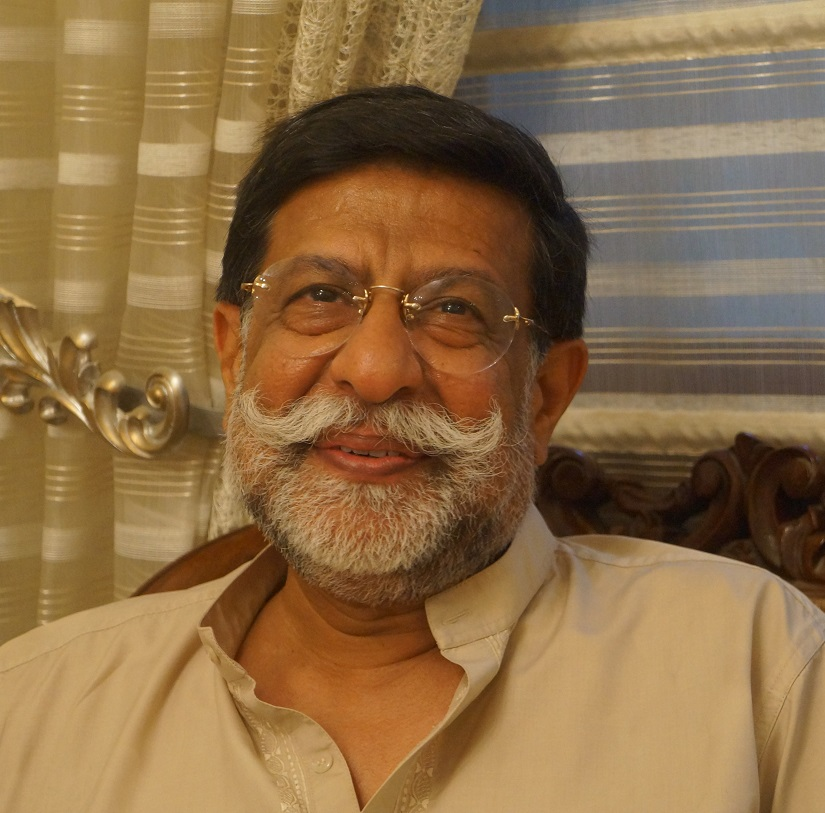

| | Majority party | Minority party |
|---|---|---|
| Leader | Muhammad Mian Soomro | Gul Naseeb Khan |
| Party | PML(Q) | MMA |
| Last election | 35 | 19 |
| Seats after | 39 | 18 |
| Seat change | ▲4 | ▼1 |
- Results by province
Chairman before election
Muhammad Mian Soomro
PML(Q)
Elected Chairman
Muhammad Mian Soomro
PML(Q)

Senate elections were held in Pakistan on 6–10 March 2006. Half of the 100 seats in the Senate were up for election with the winning candidates serving six-year terms.

== Results ==
| Party | Seats | |
| Party | Won | Total |
|---|---|---|
| Pakistan Muslim League (Q) | 20 | 39 |
| Muttahida Majlis-e-Amal | 10 | 18 |
| Pakistan Peoples Party Parliamentarians | 5 | 9 |
| Mutahidda Qaumi Movement | 3 | 6 |
| Awami National Party | 1 | 2 |
| Pashtunkhwa Milli Awami Party | 1 | 3 |
| Pakistan Muslim League (N) | 1 | 4 |
| Pakistan Peoples Party | 1 | 3 |
| Other parties | 4 | 5 |
| Independents | 4 | 11 |
| Total | 50 | 100 |
Source: IPU

=== Results by administrative division ===
Below are the results of the election, by administrative division.

Punjab
| Seat Type | Winners | | | | | | |
|---|---|---|---|---|---|---|---|
| General | Jamal Leghari (PML-Q) | Syed Javed Ali Shah (PML-Q) | Javed Ashraf Qazi (PML-Q) | Muhammad Ali Durrani (PML-Q) | Naeem Hussain Chattha (PML-Q) | Babar Awan (PPP) | Ishaq Dar (PML-N) |
| Technocrat | Syed Muhammad Zafar (PML-Q) | | | Haroon Akhtar Khan (PML-Q) | | | |
| Women | Gulshan Saeed (PML-Q) | | | | Nilofar Bakhtiar (PML-Q) | | |

Sindh
| Seat Type | Winners | | | | | | |
|---|---|---|---|---|---|---|---|
| General | Raza Rabbani (PPP) | Safdar Ali Abbasi (PPP) | Ahmad Ali (MQM) | Tahir Hussain Mashhadi (MQM) | Abdul Ghaffar Qureshi (PML-Q) | Abdul Razak Thaheem (PML-F) | Khalid Mehmood Soomro (MMA) |
| Technocrat | Javaid Laghari (PPP) | | | Syed Abdul Khaliq Pirzada (MQM) | | | |
| Women | Ratna Bhagwandas Chawla (PPP) | | | | Semeen Yusuf Siddiqui (PML-Q) | | |

Khyber Pakhtunkhwa
| Seat Type | Winners | | | | | | |
|---|---|---|---|---|---|---|---|
| General | Khurshid Ahmad (MMA) | Muhammad Talha Mahmood (MMA) | Gul Naseeb Khan (MMA) | Muhammad Ibrahim Khan (MMA) | Ammar Ahmed Khan (PML-Q) | Salim Saifullah Khan (PML-Q) | Mohammad Ghufran Khan (PPP) |
| Technocrat | Azam Swati (MMA) | | | Ilyas Ahmed Bilour (ANP) | | | |
| Women | Afia Zia (MMA) | | | | Fauzia Fakhar-uz-Zaman Khan (PML-Q) | | |

Balochistan
| Seat Type | Winners | | | | | | |
|---|---|---|---|---|---|---|---|
| General | Jan Mohammad Jamali (PML-Q) | Mohabat Khan Marri (PML-Q) | Muhammad Ismail Buledi (MMA) | Israr Ullah Zehri (BNP-A) | Abdul Rahim Khan Mandokhel (PMAP) | Abdul Malik Baloch (NP) | Shahid Hassan Bugti (JWP) |
| Technocrat | Saeed Ahmed Hashmi (PML-Q) | | | Rehmatullah Kakar (MMA) | | | |
| Women | Rehana Yahya Baloch (PML-Q) | | | | Sabina Rauf (MMA) | | |

FATA
| Seat Type | Winners | | | |
|---|---|---|---|---|
| General | Abdul Raziq (Independent) | Abdur Rashid (Independent) | Muhammad Saleh Shah (Independent) | Hafiz Rasheed Ahmed (Independent) |

ICT
| Seat Type | Winners |
|---|---|
| General | Tariq Azim Khan (PML-Q) |
| Technocrat | Wasim Sajjad (PML-Q) |

== Aftermath ==
After the election, on 13 March 2006, Muhammad Mian Soomro of the ruling Pakistan Muslim League (Q) (PML(Q)) was re-elected to the position of Chairman with 58 votes, defeating Abdul Rahim Khan Mandokhel of the Pashtunkhwa Milli Awami Party (PMAP), who only received 39 votes. On the same day, Jan Mohammad Jamali of the PML(Q) was elected to the position of Deputy Chairman with 59 votes, defeating Sajid Mir of the Pakistan Muslim League (N) (PML(N)), who only received 39 votes. Jamali replaced Khalilur Rehman, also of the PML(Q). Moreover, Wasim Sajjad of the PML(Q) continued serving as the Leader of the House, whereas Raza Rabbani of the Pakistan People's Party (PPP) continued serving as the Leader of the Opposition.
