= Iftikhar Ali Malik =

Pakistani businessperson

- افتخار علی ملک

President of the Lahore Chamber of Commerce and Industry (LCCI)
- In office 1990–1991

President of the Federation of Pakistan Chambers of Commerce and Industry (FPCCI)
- In office 2006–2007

President of the SAARC Chamber of Commerce and Industry
- In office 2020–2022

Chairman of Guard Group of Industries
- Incumbent
- Assumed office 2007

Personal details
- Born: Iftikhar Ali Malik Lahore, Pakistan
- Relations: Shahzad Malik (brother)
- Parent: Muhammad Shafi Malik
- Occupation: Businessman

Iftikhar Ali Malik is a Pakistani businessman and industrialist. He is the Chairman of the Guard Group of Industries.He has served as President of the Lahore Chamber of Commerce and Industry (LCCI), the Federation of Pakistan Chambers of Commerce and Industry (FPCCI), and the SAARC Chamber of Commerce and Industry.

== Career ==
Malik currently serves as the Chairman of the Guard Group of Industries. He was elected President of the Lahore Chamber of Commerce and Industry (LCCI) in 1990 for the 1990-91 term. He later served as President of the Federation of Pakistan Chambers of Commerce and Industry (FPCCI) for the 2006-07 term and subsequently served as President of the SAARC Chamber of Commerce and Industry from 2020, to 2022.
