= Allana =

Allana is a surname shared by several people:

- Fazila Allana (born 1970), Indian businesswoman
- Ghulam Ali Allana, Pakistani biographer and poet
- Pyar Ali Allana (c. 1936–2004), Pakistani Shia politician
- Allana Solo, a minor Star Wars character
