= Sardar Umar Gorgaij =

Pakistani politician

Member of the National Assembly of Pakistan
- In office 2008–2013
- Constituency: NA-260 (Quetta-cum-Chagai-cum-Nushki)

Member of the Senate of Pakistan
- Incumbent
- Assumed office 9 April 2024

Personal details
- Party: PPP (2008-present)

Sardar Muhammad Umar Gorgaij is a Pakistani politician who was a member of the National Assembly of Pakistan from 2008 to 2013.

== Early life and education ==
He was born on 1 July 1952 in Chaghi, Balochistan.

He received a Bachelor of Arts from the University of Balochistan.

== Political career ==
He was elected to the National Assembly of Pakistan from Constituency NA-260 (Quetta-cum-Chagai-cum-Nushki) as a candidate of Pakistan Peoples Party (PPP) in the 2008 Pakistani general election. He received 40,773 votes and defeated Sardar Fateh Muhammad Muhammad Hassani. In February 2011, he was inducted into the federal cabinet of Prime Minister Yousaf Raza Gillani and was appointed as Federal Minister for Postal Services where he served until June 2012. In June 2012, he was inducted into the federal cabinet of Prime Minister Raja Pervaiz Ashraf and was re-appointed as Federal Minister Postal Services where he continued to serve until March 2013.

He ran for the seat of the National Assembly from Constituency NA-260 (Quetta-cum-Chagai-cum-Nushki-cum-Mastungi) as a candidate of PPP in the 2013 Pakistani general election but was unsuccessful. He received 15,857 votes and lost the seat to Abdul Rahim Khan Mandokhel.
