= Junaid Akbar =

Pakistani politician (born 1977)

- جنید اکبر
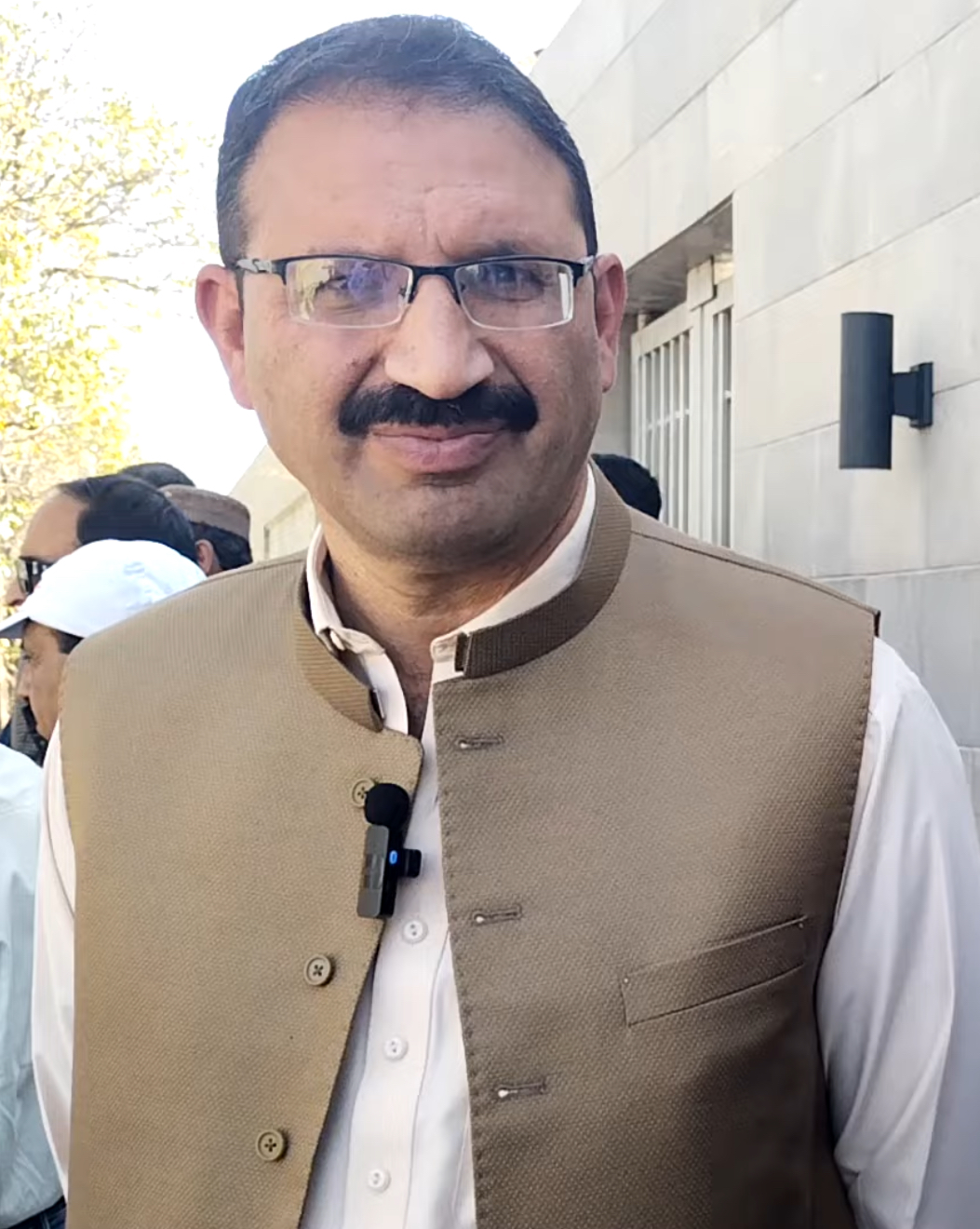

Member of the National Assembly of Pakistan
- Incumbent
- Assumed office 29 February 2024
- Constituency: NA-9 Malakand
- In office 13 August 2018 – 20 January 2023
- Constituency: NA-8 (Malakand Protected Area)
- In office 1 June 2013 – 31 May 2018
- Constituency: NA-35 (Malakand)

Chairman of the Public Accounts Committee
- Incumbent
- Assumed office 24 January 2025
- Speaker: Ayaz Sadiq
- Preceded by: Noor Alam Khan

President of PTI, Khyber Pakhtunkhwa
- Incumbent
- Assumed office 25 January 2025
- Chairman: Imran Khan; Gohar Ali Khan
- Preceded by: Ali Amin Gandapur

Personal details
- Born: 23 March 1977 (age 49) Thana, Malakand, Malakand District, Khyber Pakhtunkhwa, Pakistan
- Party: PTI (2013–present)

Junaid Akbar (Urdu: جنید اکبر; born 23 March 1977) is a Pakistani politician who is the President of PTI KP and has been a member of the National Assembly of Pakistan (MNA) since February 2024 from NA-9 Malakand. He previously served as an MNA from August 2018 till January 2023 and from June 2013 to May 2018. He has also been serving as the Chairman of the Public Accounts Committee since January 2025.

== Early life ==
He was born on 26 October 1977 in the Malakand District of Khyber Pakhtunkhwa.

== Political career ==
Akbar was elected to the National Assembly of Pakistan as a candidate of Pakistan Tehreek-e-Insaf (PTI) from NA-35 (Malakand Protected Area) in the 2013 Pakistani general election. He received 51,312 votes and defeated a candidate of Jamiat Ulema-e Islam (F).

He was re-elected to the National Assembly as a candidate of PTI from NA-8 (Malakand) in the 2018 Pakistani general election. He received 81,310 votes and defeated Bilawal Bhutto Zardari, the chairman of the Pakistan Peoples Party.

He was re-elected for the third time from NA-9 Malakand in the 2024 Pakistani general election as a PTI-backed Independent candidate. He won and secured 113,513 votes while the runner-up, Syed Ahmad Ali Shah of PPP bagged 40,740 votes.

As a lawmaker, he delivered speeches in support of the Pakistan Tehreek-e-Insaf and Imran Khan and was appointed as a focal person to the Chief Minister of Khyber Pakhtunkhwa, Ali Amin Gandapur in the National Assembly of Pakistan, though he was later removed from the position amidst rifts in the party.

Chief Minister Ali Amin Gandapur relieved Junaid Akbar as well as Mohammad Atif Khan, Sher Ali Arbab from PTI party positions. According to The News International "Atif Khan and another PTI MNA Junaid Akbar Khan had taken a stand for the former provincial minister for communication and works Shakeel Ahmad Khan when Chief Minister Gandapur removed him from the provincial cabinet allegedly on corruption charges."

In Business Recorder, "sources said that MNAs Junaid, Atif Khan, and ex-provincial minister Shakeel Khan held detailed meetings with Arif Alvi. They complained about the chief minister Ali Amin Gandapur, saying he is completely ignoring the leaders and workers who raise voice against the injustices within the party."

On 24 January 2025, he was elected unopposed as the Chairman of the Public Accounts Committee in the National Assembly.

On 25 January 2025, he was appointed by Imran Khan as the president of PTI's Khyber Pakhtunkhwa chapter, replacing Ali Amin Gandapur, the Chief Minister of Khyber Pakhtunkhwa.

== Electoral history ==
=== 2013 general election ===
2013 General Election: NA-35 (Malakand Protected Area)
Party	Candidate	Votes	%	±%
PTI	Junaid Akbar	51,312	36.92	
JUI-F	Hafiz Muhammad Saeed	22,329	16.07	
PPPP	Lal Muhammad Khan	19,081	13.73	−48.14
PML-N	Fida Muhammad	18,207	13.10	+4.48
JI	Bakhtiar Maani	16,397	11.80	
ANP	Rahmat Shah Sael	8,709	6.26	−3.48
Tehreek-e-Pasmanada Awam Pakistan	Muhammad Ibrar	1,146	0.82	
Independent	Bacha Hussain	972	0.70	
Independent	Alamgir	411	0.30	
Independent	Ijazur Rahman	227	0.16	
Independent	Alhaj Muhammad Khan	193	0.14	
Majority		28,983	20.85	
Turnout		138,984	45.95	+14.66
PTI gain from PPPP				

A total of 4,362 votes were rejected.

=== 2018 general election ===
General election 2018: NA-8 (Malakand Protected Area)
Party	Candidate	Votes	%	±%
PTI	Junaid Akbar	81,310	43.61	▲6.69
PPP	Bilawal Bhutto Zardari	43,724	23.45	▲9.72
MMA	Gul Naseeb Khan	31,379	16.83	▼11.04^{†}
Others	Others (ten candidates)	24,065	12.91	
Turnout		186,429	48.24	▲2.29
Rejected ballots		5,591	3.00	
Majority		37,586	20.16	
Registered electors		386,449		
PTI hold		Swing	N/A	

^{†}JI and JUI-F contested as part of MMA

=== 2024 general election ===
General elections were held on 8 February 2024. Junaid Akbar won the election with 113,545 votes.

General election 2024: NA-9 Malakand
Party	Candidate	Votes	%	±%
PTI	Junaid Akbar (Note: Filed nomination papers as PTI candidate but ECP allowed him to run as an Independent)	113,545	57.83	▲14.22
PPP	Syed Ahmad Ali Shah	40,785	20.77	▼2.68
JUI (F)	Kifayat Ullah	16,785	8.55	N/A
JI	Jamal Ud Din	16,268	8.29	N/A
Others	Others (eleven candidates)	8,971	4.57	
Turnout		202,083	43.14	▼5.10
Rejected ballots		5,729	2.83	
Majority		72,760	37.06	▲16.90
Registered electors		468,451		

== See also ==
- No-confidence motion against Imran Khan
