= Bangladesh Textile Mills Corporation =

- Abbreviation: BTMC
- Formation: 1972
- Type: Government
- Headquarters: Dhaka, Bangladesh
- Location: BTMC Bhaban 7-9, Kawran Bazar, Dhaka-1215
- Region served: Bangladesh
- Official language: Bengali
- Chairman: Brigadier General Md Ziaul Haque
- Website: www.btmc.gov.bd

Bangladesh Textile Mills Corporation, or BTMC, is a public corporation that owns and manages all government textile mills in Bangladesh and is located in Dhaka. It manages 18 government owned textile factories.

== History ==
The corporation was established on 26 March 1972 through the nationalization of textile mills in Bangladesh. It owns Eagle Textile in Chittagong. The Ministry for Textiles and Jute is responsible for running the corporation. The corporation has the largest liability of any state owned enterprise in Bangladesh with 76.54 billion taka in loans. Nearly 99% of its loans are in default. Rangamati Textile Mill is also owned by the corporation. It used to manage 86 government owned textile mills which has been reduced to the 18 today.

== List of nationalised textile mills ==
About 73 textile mills were nationalised following the independence of Bangladesh and later they became subsidiaries of the Bangladesh Textile Mills Corporation. The list is given below:

- Adarsha Cotton Spinning and Weaving Mills
- Ahmed Bawany Textile Mills
- Ahmed Silk Mills
- Al-Haj Textile Mills
- Amin Textile Limited
- Ashraf Textile Mills
- Asiatic Cotton Mills
- Bengal Textile Mills
- Bogra Cotton Spinning
- Calico Cotton Mills
- Chand Textile Mills
- Chisty Textile Mills
- Chittagong Textile Mills
- Chittaranjan Cotton Mills
- Cotton Textile Crafts
- Dacca Cotton Mills
- Dacca Dyeing and Manufacturing Company
- Dhakeswari Cotton Mills
- Dost Textile Mills
- Eagle Star Textile Mills
- Elahi Cotton Mills
- E. P. Textile Mills
- Fine Cotton Mills
- Gawsia Cotton Spinning Mills
- Goalundo Textile Mills
- Habibur Rahman Textile Mills
- Halima Textile Limited
- Ibrahim Cotton Mills
- Jaba Textile Mills
- Jalil Textile Mills
- Jess Blanket Manufacturing Co.
- Karim Silk Mills
- Khulna Textile Mills
- Kohinoor Spinning Mills
- Kokil Textile Mills
- Kushtia Textile Mills
- Luxmi Narayan Cotton Mills
- Mainamati Textile Mills
- Meghna Textile Mills
- Metex Cotton
- Mohini Mills
- Monnoo Textile Mills
- Moula Textile Mills
- Muslin Cotton Mills
- National Cotton Mills
- N. H. Textile Mills
- Olympia Textile Mills
- Orient Textile Mills
- Pahartali Textile and Hosiery Mills
- Paruma Textile Mills
- Pylon Industries
- Quaderia Textile Mills
- Quasem Cotton Mills
- Rahman Textile Mills
- Raz Textile Mills
- R. R. Textile Mills
- Rupali Noor Textile Mill
- Rupali Nylon
- Satrang Textile Mills
- Serajganj Spinning and Cotton Mills
- Sharmin Textile Mills
- Tamizuddin Textile Mills
- Tangail Cotton Mills
- Zeenat Taxtile Mills
- Afsar Cotton Mills
- Bangladesh Textile Mills
- Dhakeswari Cotton Mills
- Eastern Textile Mills
- Mohammadi Calendering & Printing Mills
- Nylon Industries
- Valika Woolen Mills Co. (Chittagong) Limited
- Alauddin and Taiera Textile Mills
- Zaritex Limited
- Zofine Fabrics
