= Enver Baig =

Pakistani politician (1948–2023)

- محمد انور بیگ

Chairperson of Benazir Income Support Programme
- In office 8 November 2013 – 26 November 2014
- President: Mamnoon Hussain
- Prime Minister: Nawaz Sharif
- Preceded by: Farzana Raja
- Succeeded by: Marvi Memon

Personal details
- Born: 14 December 1948
- Died: 21 April 2023 (aged 74) Islamabad, Pakistan
- Party: PPP (1988–2013); PML(N) (2013-2023)
- Occupation: Politician

Enver Baig (Urdu: محمد انور بیگ; 14 December 1948 – 21 April 2023) was a Pakistani politician and member of the Senate of Pakistan. He was affiliated politically with the Pakistan People's Party until 2013 before joining the Pakistan Muslim League (N). He served as chairperson of the Benazir Income Support Programme from 2013 to 2014.

== Political career ==
Baig served as a member of the Senate of Pakistan on the Pakistan Peoples Party (PPP) ticket from 2003 to 2009. In 2013, he joined the Pakistan Muslim League (N) (PML-N) after PPP suspended his party membership due to alleged party discipline violation.

Baig was appointed chairman of the Benazir Income Support Programme (BISP) by President Mamnoon Hussain in November 2013 on the Prime Minister's advice. He resigned from this post a year later, in November 2014, and was appointed chairman of Pakistan Industrial Development Corporation (PIDC), a lesser position than BISP Chairman.

== Achievements ==
Baig served as honorary consul general of the Republic of Uruguay in Pakistan, and president of the Pakistan Overseas Employment Promoters Association from 1982 to 1983. He chaired the Standing Committee on Manpower and Overseas Pakistanis for the Federation of Pakistan Chamber of Commerce and Industry (FPCCI) from 1994 to 1995, and chaired the FPCCI's Standing Committee on Diplomatic Affairs from 1995 to 1998. Baig was also a member of the PPP's Policy Planning Wing.

== Controversy ==
Baig asked the Public Accounts Committee of Pakistan (PAC) for audits of the Pakistan Cricket Board (PCB) in 2007; he termed the then PCB chairman Nasim Ashraf "the most incompetent official in the PCB".

Ashraf, in reply, called Baig "a sick man." However, these statements were withdrawn in a meeting of the Senate Standing Committee on Sports held under the chairmanship of Tahir Hussain Mashhadi.

In February 2009, Baig accused the Pakistan national cricket team's players of being involved in match fixing, stating that "the main problem in the Pakistan team is gambling and match-fixing".

== Death ==
On 21 April 2023, Baig died at his house in Islamabad at age 74.

== See also ==
- List of Senators of Pakistan
- List of committees of the Senate of Pakistan

Political offices
Preceded by Farzana Raja	Chairperson of Benazir Income Support Programme; 2013–2014	Succeeded by Marvi Memon
