= Public accounts committee =

Legislative committee which reviews government accounts

A public accounts committee (PAC) is a committee within a legislature whose role is to study public audits, invite ministers, permanent secretaries or other ministry officials to the committee for questioning, and report on their findings subsequent to a government budget audit. Typically, the government is required to report back to parliament on PAC recommendations within a specified period, usually two to six months. More often than not, opposition members chair PACs in the commonwealth. Based on their findings, PACs often make recommendations to government ministries requiring that they change certain policies and procedures to improve their operations.

== History ==
The majority of legislatures descending from the British Parliament use public account committees to follow up on the findings of public audits. Since the creation of the Public Accounts Committee in the Gladstonian Reforms of 1861, PACs have become ubiquitous throughout the Commonwealth. The tremendous expansion and scope of government and of state-owned enterprises during the second half of the 20th century made PACs, which are charged with overseeing government expenditures, even more important.

== Challenges ==
Public Accounts Committees face several challenges. For one, auditors general are often poorly funded, and their reports may be lengthy, complex, poorly organized, and difficult to understand. Funding and staff shortages mean that audit reports are often years behind, so ministry officials needed for questioning might have moved on. In many cases auditors general are appointed by the executive and so may have little incentive to uncover problems that could embarrass those who appointed them. Investigating report findings is time and labor-intensive. Parliaments need professional staff, but they are often not available. Finally, governments are often not responsive to parliament, and there may be few tools at a parliament's disposal to compel government compliance.

== National examples ==
- Public Accounts Committee (Canada) (officially Standing Committee on Public Accounts, PACP) of the Canadian House of Commons
- Public Accounts Committee (Hong Kong) of the Hong Kong Legislative Council
- Public Accounts Committee (India) of the Parliament of India
- State Finance Accountability Committee of the Peoples Representative Council (DPR) of Indonesia
- Public Accounts Committee (Ireland) of the Irish Oireachtas
- Public Accounts Committee (Malaysia) of the Parliament of Malaysia
- Standing Committee on Public Accounts (Malta) of the Maltese House of Representatives
- Public Accounts Committee (New South Wales) of the Parliament of New South Wales
- Finance and Expenditure Committee of the Parliament of New Zealand
- Public Accounts Committee (Pakistan) of the National Assembly of Pakistan
- Standing Committee on Public Accounts of the National Assembly of South Africa
- Public Accounts Committee of the Scottish Parliament, see Committees of the Scottish Parliament
- Public Accounts Committee (Singapore) of the Parliament of Singapore
- Public Accounts Committee (Tasmania) of the Parliament of Tasmania
- Public Accounts Committee (United Kingdom) of the British House of Commons

== See also ==
- Joint Committee of Public Accounts and Audit of the Parliament of Australia
