= Lal Muhammad Khan =

Pakistani politician (died 2025)

- لال محمد خان

Member of the National Assembly of Pakistan
- In office 2008–2013
- Constituency: NA-35 (Malakand Protected Area)

Personal details
- Died: 8 November 2025

Lal Muhammad Khan (Urdu: لال محمد خان; died 8 November 2025) was a Pakistani politician who was a member of the National Assembly of Pakistan from 2008 to 2013. He was also a member of the Provincial Assembly of Khyber Pakhtunkhwa from 1988 to 1990.

== Life and career ==
Khan was elected to the Provincial Assembly of Khyber Pakhtunkhwa as a candidate of the Pakistan Peoples Party (PPP) from Constituency PF-80 (Malakand Protected Area-II) in the 1988 Pakistani general election. He received 12,079 votes and defeated an independent candidate, Ahmad Hussain Khan.

He ran for the seat of the Provincial Assembly of Khyber Pakhtunkhwa as a candidate of the Pakistan Democratic Alliance (PDA) from Constituency PF-80 (Malakand Protected Area-II) in the 1990 Pakistani general election but was unsuccessful. He received 9,569 votes and lost the seat to Fazle Haq, a candidate of Islami Jamhoori Ittehad (IJI).

Khan ran for the seat of the Provincial Assembly of Khyber Pakhtunkhwa as an independent candidate from Constituency PF-80 (Malakand Protected Area-II) in the 1993 Pakistani general election but was unsuccessful. He received 3,447 votes and lost the seat to Ghani Muhammad Khan, a candidate of PPP.

He ran for the seat of the National Assembly of Pakistan from Constituency NA-35 (Malakand Protected Area) as a candidate of PPP in the 2002 Pakistani general election but was unsuccessful. He received 17,538 votes and lost the seat to Muhammad Inayat Ur-Rehman, a candidate of Muttahida Majlis-e-Amal (MMA).

Khan was elected to the National Assembly from Constituency NA-35 (Malakand Protected Area) as a candidate of PPP in the 2008 Pakistani general election. He received 34,472 votes and defeated Nisar Muhammad, a candidate of Pakistan Peoples Party (Sherpao) (PPP-S). In November 2008, he was inducted into the federal cabinet of Prime Minister Yousaf Raza Gillani and was appointed the Federal Minister for Special Initiatives where he continued to serve until December 2010. From February 2011 to December 2012, he remained in the federal cabinet with the status of federal minister without any portfolio.

He ran for the seat of the National Assembly from Constituency NA-35 (Malakand) as a candidate of PPP in the 2013 Pakistani general election but was unsuccessful. He received 19,081 votes and lost the seat to Junaid Akbar.

Khan died on 8 November 2025.
