= Syed Abdul Khaliq Pirzada =

Pakistani politician

Molana Syed Abdul Khaliq Pirzada Al-Azhari
- سید عبدالخالق پیرزادہ

Member of the Senate of Pakistan
- Incumbent
- Assumed office 2006

Personal details
- Born: 1950 (age 75–76) Kabirwala, Punjab, Pakistan
- Party: Muttahida Quami Movement (MQM)
- Education: M.A in Arabic and Islamic Studies (Jamia Ashrafia); M.A in Religious Studies (Al-Azhar University); Ph.D. in World Comparative Religions (Al-Azhar University)

Molana Syed Abdul Khaliq Pirzada Al-Azhari (Urdu: سید عبدالخالق پیرزادہ; born in 1950 in Kabirwala), commonly known as Peer Saheb of Kabirwala, is a Pakistani professor and politician. He was elected as a senator for the Muttahida Quami Movement (MQM) in the 2006 Pakistani Senate election.

Pirzada comes from a religious and political family and is the son of Syed Mohammad Saeed Ahmed Pirzada, popularly known as Peer Pathan Peer Afghani, who was a prominent majzoob and ex-gaddi nasheen of Dargah Kabirwala Shareef (Khanewal Shareef).

== Early life and education ==
Syed Abdul Khaliq Pirzada studied at the local madrassa, in Multan, and then in the maktab (school) of Jamia Ashrafia, Lahore. Later, Pirzada was accepted at the Jamia Ashrafia where he studied Islamic studies earning double M.A degree in Arabic and Islamic Studies.

== Higher education ==
In 1978, Pirzada went to Cairo, Egypt. After being accepted at the Al-Azhar University Unlike many of his colleagues who have only received degrees from madrassas, Pirzada is a "refined product" of Al-Azhar University, studied and researched in world comparative religions there, under reputed religious and divinity research scholars. After four years, Syed Abdul Khaliq Pirzada completed and published his master's thesis on Dawat-El-Islam with thesis and was awarded an M.A. in religious studies. After five years of M.Phil. in 1992 he completed his Ph.D. and published his thesis on world comparative religions.

== Political career ==
Syed Abdul Khaliq Pirzada has served as a politician from Karachi, Sindh, Pakistan. In 1998, Pirzada came back to Pakistan and joined MQM.. He took the highest number of votes in the 2006 Pakistani Senate election. He was also nominated by his party as a candidate for the Chairman of the Senate of Pakistan where he unsuccessfully contested against Muhammad Mian Soomro. He is a parliamentary leader of the political party MQM.
