= Ruquiya Saeed Hashmi =

Pakistani politician

Member of the Provincial Assembly of Balochistan
- In office 29 May 2013 – 31 May 2018
- Constituency: Reserved seat for women

Personal details
- Other political affiliations: Pakistan Muslim League (Q)
- Spouse: Saeed Hashmi

Ruquiya Saeed Hashmi (Urdu: رقیہ سعید ہاشمی) is a Pakistani politician who was a Member of the Provincial Assembly of Balochistan from May 2013 to May 2018. Ms.Hashmi is married to Senator Saeed Hashmi.

== Education ==
Hashmi holds the degree of the Bachelor of Medicine and Bachelor of Surgery.

== Political career ==
She was elected to the Provincial Assembly of Balochistan as a candidate of Pakistan Muslim League (Q) on a reserved seat for women in the 2013 Pakistani general election.
