= Ali Hussam Asghar =

Pakistani businessperson

- علی حسام اصغر

Senior Vice Chairman of the Rice Exporters Association of Pakistan
- In office 2018–2019

Chairman of the Rice Exporters Association of Pakistan
- In office 2021–2022

President of the Lahore Chamber of Commerce and Industry
- Incumbent
- Assumed office 2026

Personal details
- Born: Lahore, Pakistan
- Citizenship: Pakistan
- Occupation: Businessperson

Ali Hussam Asghar is a Pakistani businessman. He is the President of the Lahore Chamber of Commerce and Industry (LCCI). He has served as Chairman and Senior Vice Chairman of the Rice Exporters Association of Pakistan (REAP).

== Career ==
Asghar was elected Senior Vice Chairman of the Rice Exporters Association of Pakistan (REAP) in September 2018 for the 2018-19 term. In 2021, he was elected Chairman of REAP and served until 2022. On 2 October 2026, he assumed office as President of the Lahore Chamber of Commerce and Industry (LCCI).
