= Lahore Chamber of Commerce & Industry =

Business organisation in Lahore, Pakistan

The Lahore Chamber of Commerce & Industry
- Abbreviation: LCCI
- Founded: 1923
- Founded at: Lahore, British India
- Headquarters: Lahore, Pakistan
- Region served: Punjab, Pakistan
- Members: 46,000
- President: Ali Hussam Asghar
- Key people: Ali Hussam Asghar - President; Sardar Usman Ghani - Senior Vice President; Khadim Hussain - Vice President
- Affiliations: Federation of Pakistan Chambers of Commerce and Industry (FPCCI)
- Website: lcci.com.pk
- Formerly called: Northern India Chamber of Commerce : 1923-1948; West Punjab and NWFP Chamber of Commerce : 1948-1953; Punjab and NWFP Chamber of Commerce : 1953-1956; West Pakistan Chamber of Commerce and Industry : 1956-1960; Lahore Chamber of Commerce and Industry (LCCI) : 1960-present

The Lahore Chamber of Commerce & Industry (LCCI) is a Chamber of commerce for Lahore, Pakistan. It was established in 1923, originally as Northern India Chamber of Commerce (NICC).

LCCI works to promote trade and industry and support the development of the business community.

== History ==
The Lahore Chamber of Commerce and Industry was established by the businessmen and industrialists of northern India in 1923 under the name of "Northern India Chamber of Commerce and Industry". Following the partition of British India, it was renamed the West Punjab and NWFP Chamber of Commerce in 1948 and later the Punjab and NWFP Chamber of Commerce in 1953. In 1956, it became the West Pakistan Chamber of Commerce and Industry. In 1960, the present name, "The Lahore Chamber of Commerce and Industry", was adopted. Today, the chamber is the first ISO-certified chamber of Pakistan.

== Organization and activities ==
=== Aims and objectives ===
LCCI aims to represent its members and contribute to the nation's economic development through the promotion of trade and industry. LCCI acts as a bridge between the government and the business community. It plays an important role in policy formulation by maintaining a constant interaction with the relevant authorities.

=== Composition ===
LCCI is affiliated with the Federation of Pakistan Chamber of Commerce & Industry. It has two classes of membership, namely, Corporate and Associate. This Chamber has currently more than 46,000 members and LCCI claims to be the biggest chamber in Pakistan.

=== Management ===
The organization's policies and programs are determined by the 32 members of Executive Committee who are elected by the members, for two years, The office bearers are elected by the members of the Executive Committee after Election, which are held after two years. The President controls the working of the office and staff and directs all matters of the Chamber, with the assistance of Senior Vice-President and Vice-President.

=== Research and Development Department ===
In 1985, Research and Development Department was established at LCCI to act as the Think Tank and Advocacy Arm. The department is active to help business community is meeting their day to day need through providing updated information regarding business and economy and macro and micro business and economic policies of the government. The department is in contact with various government and international agencies in order to get consultation regarding important national and international policy matters which could affect directly or indirectly business, trade and industry.

== Office-bearers ==
=== Presidents ===
- Chaudhry Nazer Muhammad; 1967
- Rafique Saigol; 1968
- Naseer A. Sheikh; 1969
- Majeed Mufti; 1970
- Muhammad Saeed; 1971
- Tajammal Hussain; 1972
- Mumtaz A. Sheikh; 1973
- M. Amin Agha; 1974
- Abdullah Sheikh; 1975
- A. Aziz Zulfiqar; 1976
- M. Ijaz Butt; 1977
- Maqbool Sadiq; 1978
- Arshad Saeed; 1979
- Sheikh Iqbal; 1980
- Shahzada Alam Monnoo; 1981
- Abdul Qayyam; 1982
- Mohsin Raza Bukhari; 1983
- Mushtaq Ahmad; 1984
- Shahbaz Sharif; 1985
- Mohammad Arshad Naeem; 1986
- Mumtaz Hameed; 1987
- Mir Salah ud Din; 1988
- Tariq Hameed; 1989
- Iftikhar Ali Malik; 1990
- Mohammad Ashraf; 1991
- Salahuddin Ahmad Sahaf; 1992
- Ishaq Dar; 1993
- Bashir Ahmed Buksh; 1994
- Tariq Sayeed Saigol; 1995–96
- Sheikh Waheed Ud Din; 1997
- Sheikh Saleem Ali; 1998
- Pervez Hanif; 1999
- Ilyas M. Chaudhry; 2000
- Sheikh M. Asif; 2001
- Khalid J. Chowdhry; 2002
- Muhammad Yawar Irfan Khan; 2003
- Anjum Nasir; 2004
- Misbah ur Rehman; 2005
- Shafqat Ali; 2006
- Shahid Hassan Sheikh; 2007
- Mohammad Ali Mian; 2008
- Muzaffar Ali; 2009
- Zafar Iqbal Chaudhry; 2010
- Shahzad Ali Malik; 2011
- Irfan Qaiser Sheikh; 2012
- Farooq Iftikhar; 2013
- Sohail Lashari; 2014
- Ijaz Ahmad Mumtaz; 2015
- Sheikh Muhammad Arshad; 2016
- Abdul Basit; 2017
- Malik Tahir Javed; 2018
- Almas Hyder; 2019
- Irfan Iqbal Sheikh; 2020
- Tariq Misbah; 2021
- Nauman Kabir; 2022
- Kashif Anwar; 2023–2024
- Abuzar Shad; 2024–2025
- Faheem ur Rehman Saigol; 2025–2026
- Ali Hussam Asghar; 2026–present

=== Senior vice-presidents ===
- Mian Naseer A. Sheikh; 1968
- A. Majid Mufti; 1969
- Muhammad Saeed; 1970
- Mian Tajammal Hussain; 1971
- Mumtaz A. Sheikh; 1972
- M. Amin Agha; 1973
- Abaidullah Sheikh; 1974
- A. Aziz Zulfikar; 1975
- Maqbool Sadiq; 1977
- S. Arshad Saeed; 1978
- Sheikh Muhammad Iqbal; 1979
- Mian Shazada A. Monnoo; 1980
- Abdul Qayyaum Bhatty; 1981
- Syed Mohsin Raza Bukhari; 1982
- Mushtaq Ahmad; 1983
- Shehbaz Sharif; 1984
- Muhammad Arshad Naeem; 1985
- Mumtaz Hameed; 1986
- Mir Salahuddin; 1987
- Tariq Hamid; 1988
- Iftikhar Ali Malik; 1989
- Mian Muhammad Ashraf; 1990
- Salahuddin Ahmad Sahaf; 1991
- Mohammad Ishaq Dar; 1992
- Bashir A. Buksh; 1993
- Tariq Saeed Saigol; 1994
- Sheikh Waheed Ud Din; 1995
- Sheikh Waheed Ud Din; 1996
- Pervez Hanif; 1998
- Ilyas M. Chaudhry; 1999
- Sheikh Muhammad Asif; 2000
- Farooq Iftikhar; 2001
- Mian Muhammad Jehangir; 2002
- Pervaiz Anwar Sheikh; 2003
- Mian Misbah Ur Rehman; 2004
- Sohail Lashari; 2005
- Abdul Basit; 2006
- Yaqoob Tahir Izhar; 2007
- Mian Muzaffar Ali; 2008
- Tahir Javaid Malik; 2009
- Ijaz A. Mumtaz; 2010
- Sheikh Muhammad Arshad; 2011
- Kashif Younis Meher; 2012
- Irfan Iqbal Sheikh; 2013
- Mian Tariq Misbah-Ur-Rehman; 2014
- Mian Nauman Kabir; 2015
- Almas Hyder; 2016
- Amjad Ali Jawa; 2017
- Khawaja Khawar Rashid; 2018
- Khawaja Shahzad Nasir; 2019
- Ali Hussam Asghar; 2020
- M. Nasir Hameed Khan; 2021
- Mian Rehman Aziz Chan; 2022
- Zafar Mahmood Ch.; 2022-2024
- Khalid Usman; 2024-2025
- Tanveer Ahmed Sheikh; 2025-2026
- Sardar Usman Ghani; 2026–present

=== Vice-presidents ===
- Nazar Muhammad; 1966
- M. Rafiq Saigol; 1967
- Mian Humayun Butt; 1968
- M. Amin Agha; 1969
- Muhammad Ismail Naik; 1970
- Sheikh Wahid Ud Din; 1971
- Khalid Mansur; 1972
- M. Nasim Saigol; 1973
- Sheikh Mohammad Iqbal; 1974
- Syed Mohsin Raza Bukhari; 1975
- A. Qayyum Bhatty; 1976
- S. Arshad Saeed; 1977
- F. M. Khan; 1978
- Ijazul Haq Chaudhry; 1979
- Bashir A. Buksh; 1980
- Syed Mohsin Raza Bukhari; 1981
- Muhammad Arshad Naeem; 1982
- Mahmood Ali Bhatti; 1983
- Salahuddin Ahmad Sahaf; 1984
- Mian Misbah Ur Rehman; 1985
- Khawaja Zubair Ahmad; 1986
- Mian Mohammad Asharf; 1987
- Sikandar Hasyat Malhi; 1988
- Farooq Iftikhar; 1989
- Salahuddin Ahmad Sahaf; 1990
- Mohammad Ishaq Dar; 1991
- Sheikh Muhammad Asif; 1992
- Mohammad Tariq Shafi; 1993
- Shahid Hassan Sheikh; 1994
- Muhammad Naeem; 1995
- Muhammad Naeem; 1996
- Muhammad Yousaf Dar; 1997
- Sikandar M. Khan; 1998
- Sheikh Muhammad Asif; 1999
- Samad Amin; 2000
- Munir Ahmed Khan; 2001
- Muhammad Yawar Irfan Khan; 2002
- Muhammad Ali Mian; 2003
- Shahzad Ali Malik; 2004
- Sheikh Muhammad Arshad; 2005
- Aftab A. Vohra; 2006
- Mubasher Sheikh; 2007
- Shafqat Saeed Piracha; 2008
- Irfan Iqbal Sheikh; 2009
- Faisal Iqbal Sheikh; 2010
- Sohail Azhar; 2011
- Saeeda Nazar; 2012
- Mian Abuzar Shad; 2013
- Kashif Anwar; 2014
- Syed Mahmood Ghaznavi; 2015
- Nasir Saeed; 2016
- Muhammad Nasir Hameed Khan; 2017
- Zeeshan Khalil; 2018
- Faheem-ur-Rehman Saigal; 2019
- Mian Zahid Jawaid Ahmad; 2020
- Tahir Manzoor; 2021
- Haris Ateeq; 2022
- Adnan Khalid Butt; 2022–24
- Shahid Nazir Chaudhry; 2024–25
- Khurram Lodhi; 2025–26
- Khadim Hussain; 2026–present
