= Rice Exporters Association of Pakistan =

Pakistani governmental organisation

The Rice Exporters Association of Pakistan (REAP) was established in 1988–89 under the patronage of the Ministry of Commerce, Ministry of Food, Agriculture and Livestock, and the Planning Division of the Government of Pakistan. REAP played a significant role in defining rice standards in Pakistan. Consequently, Pakistan Rice Standards were established in 1992 for the first time, with support of the Pakistan Standards Institution.

The Managing Committee is divided into north (11 members) and south (12 members) zones. In 1998–99, REAP membership became compulsory for all rice exporters.

== Achievements ==
REAP has 1900 members in the region and is the country's second largest business association. In 1988–89 REAP members exported over 2 million tons of rice. In 1992, REAP hosted countries from the Persian Gulf region to gather government buyers from Kuwait, Oman, UAE, Bahrain, Qatar and Saudi Arabia. During that period about 36,000 tons from private sector were exported. In 1996–97, while negotiating with the European Commission, REAP obtained abatement in import duties of 250 ECU/ton for Super and/or Kernel Basmati Brown rice. Pakistan has market share of 60,000 tons out of a total market size of about 120,000 tons of Basmati rice.

== Other activities ==
REAP organizes seminars and training workshops to educate growers, millers and traders the latest techniques, bottlenecks faced and how to solve problems like the control of Khapra beetle on rice crops.

Pakistan's rice exports grew 57 percent during financial year 2009–10. In 2009, REAP exported basmati rice at an average price of $825 per ton, down 33 percent compared with $1,102 per ton the preceding year. In 2010, Pakistan was exporting rice to 109 countries of the world.

In fiscal 2012, rice exports from Pakistan crossed 3.7 million tons, valued at $2.08 billion at an average price of $871 per ton for Basmati rice, and $448 per ton for non-Basmati rice.

== Chairmen ==
- Javed Islam Agha 1994–1999
- Shahzad Ali Malik (1999 – 2001)
- Abdul Rahim Janoo 2001–2003
- Syed Najaf Hussain Shah (2003–2005)
- Abdul Majid (2005–2006)
- Abdul Aziz Maniya (2006–2007)
- Muhammad Azhar Akhtar (2007–2008)
- Abdul Rahim Janoo (2008–2009)
- Malik Mohammad Jehangir (2009–2010)
- Irfan Ahmed Sheikh (2010–2011)
- Javed Ali Ghori (2012)
- Masood Iqbal 2012–2014
- Rafique Suleman (2014-2015)
- Chaudhry Shafique (2015-2016)
- Samee Ullah Chaudhry (2017-2018)
- Safder Hussain Mehkari (2018-2019)
- Shahjahan Malik (2019-2020)
- Abdul Qayyum Paracha (2020-2021)
- Ali Hussam Asghar (2021-2022)
- Chela Ram Kewlani (2022-2023)
- Chela Ram Kewlani (2023-2024)
- Malik Faisal Jahangir (2024-2026)
- Muhammad Raza (2026-present)

== Vice Chairmen ==
- Haroon Kassam (1999– 2001)
- Masood Ahmed Khokar (2001– 2003)
- Sheikh Arshad Mehmud (2003– 2004)
- Muhammad Anwar Mianoor (2004– 2005)
- Muhammad Tariq Aziz (2005– 2007)
- Abdul Baseer (2007– 2008)
- Mian Haroon-Ur-Rashid (2008– 2009)
- Rafique Suleman (2009–2010)
- Taufiq Ahmed Khan (2010–2011)
- Muhammad Tahir (2012–2013)
- Samee Ullah Chaudhry (2013-2014)
- Shahjahan Malik (2016-2017)
- Hamjdullah Khan Tareen (2017-2018)
- Haji Lal Muhammad (2018-2019)
- Abdul Wali (2019-2020)
- Syed Abdul Mateen (2021-2022)
- Mohibullah (2024-2026)
- Syed Muhammad Naseem (2026-present)

=== Senior Vice Chairmen ===
- Rafique Suleman (2017-2018)
- Ali Hussam Asghar (2018-2019)
- Muhammad Raza (2019-2020)
- Muhammad Anwar Mianoor (2021-2022)
- Ahsan Saeed (2026-present)
