= Marvi Memon =

Pakistani politician

Chairperson of Benazir Income Support Programme
- In office 25 February 2015 – 23 June 2018
- President: Mamnoon Hussain
- Prime Minister: Nawaz Sharif; Shahid Khaqan Abbasi
- Preceded by: Enver Baig

Member of the National Assembly of Pakistan
- In office 1 June 2013 – 31 May 2018
- In office 17 March 2008 – 23 June 2011
- Constituency: Reserved seat for women

Personal details
- Born: 21 July 1964 (age 62) Karachi, Sindh, Pakistan
- Parent: Nisar Memon (father)
- Education: London School of Economics

Marvi Memon (Sindhi: ماروي ميمڻ; born 21 July 1972) is a Pakistani politician who served as Chairperson of the Benazir Income Support Programme, from February 2015 until June 2018. She had been a member of the National Assembly of Pakistan from March 2008 to June 2011 and again from June 2013 to May 2018. Her career was shrouded by severe corruption and incompetency allegations.

== Early life and education ==
Memon was born in July 1972 in Karachi, Sindh, Pakistan to Nisar Memon in a Sindhi Memon family.

Memon studied in Karachi, Kuwait City and Paris, She then enrolled in the London School of Economics from where she completed her BSc (Econ.) Honors in International Relations in 1993.

== Professional career ==
Prior to joining politics, Memon worked as an intern at DAWN, Newsline, Pakistan Institute of International Affairs, International Union for Conservation of Nature and the United States embassy in Islamabad.

After graduating from the London School of Economics, Memon worked as a banker at Citibank where she specialized in Marketing and Quality Management before moving to launch Trakker, Pakistan's largest vehicle tracking service provider which established her as an entrepreneur. Memon joined the Inter-Services Public Relations in 2004 and served in its media monitoring and analysis wing until 2007. She also worked as a media consultant to Board of Investment.

== Political career ==
Memon launched her political career as an advisor within Pakistan's Board of Investment, her primary role being advising the Minister of Strategies on marketing Pakistan's profitable sectors. She joined Pakistan Muslim League (Q) (PML-Q) in 2007 and was elected to the National Assembly of Pakistan in the 2008 general election on a reserved seat for women from Punjab.

During her tenure as MNA, she served as a member on the opposition benches, and held various positions including a member of the standing committee of Environment, Information Technology and Kashmir. Her work paid particular focus on rural and urban vulnerabilities faced by women. Some of her key legislative pieces include:

1. The Acid and Burns Crime Legislation, which also became the subject of Pakistan's first Oscar winning documentary
2. Legislation to set up the Pakistani Institute of Parliamentary Services, which is Pakistan's first research and training institute for parliamentarians
3. Procedures and obligations of airlines after air crashes
4. Supreme Court of Pakistan's Flood Commission Report which is a technical report taking account of climate change, and government obligations pre and post flooding
5. Rights of rural women faced with honour killings
6. Worker rights in the agriculture sector

Memon resigned from the National Assembly in 2011 and left the PML-Q in protest after the party joined the PPP led-coalition government.

In 2012, she launched her memoir, My Parliamentary Diaries, an account of everyday life as a parliamentarian.

Memon joined Pakistan Muslim League (N) (PML-N) in 2012, and was elected to the National Assembly on a reserved seat for women from Sindh. Memon initially served as Prime minister's youth wing coordinator before she was appointed Chairperson of the Standing Committee for Information Broadcasting and Heritage. During her tenure as Chairperson, the Committee passed through various reforms with the objective of maintaining legislative oversight over the Federal Government's information Ministry. In February 2015, she was appointed Chairperson of Benazir Income Support Programme with status of Minister of State.

In April 2017, she was appointed as the member of the Advisory Council on Gender and Development at World Bank.

She ceased to hold the status of Minister of State when the federal cabinet was disbanded after Nawaz Sharif resigned as Prime Minister. Following the election of Shahid Khaqan Abbasi as the new prime minister in August 2017, she was re-appointed as the Minister of State in the federal cabinet of Prime Minister Shahid Khaqan Abbasi and was elevated to federal minister in the federal cabinet of Prime Minister Shahid Khaqan Abbasi until the dissolution of the National Assembly on the expiration of its term in May 2018.

In November 2018, Memon founded the Lifelong Learners Consultancy, providing consultancy services on development, national security, women empowerment, medium management and poverty alleviation to organisation, universities, governments and corporates.

== Awards and honours ==
In March 2017, Memon received the Speaker's Democracy Award by the House of Commons of the United Kingdom.

In July 2017, she was conferred the French National Order of Merit by the French Ambassador to Pakistan in Islamabad.

Political offices
| Preceded by Enver Baig | Chairperson of Benazir Income Support Programme; 2015 | Incumbent |
