= Pyar Ali Allana =

Pakistani politician

Pyar Ali Allana was a politician from Karachi, Sindh, Pakistan. Pyar Ali Allana was a former member of the Federal Parliament and an education minister in the province of Sindh. He was son of Ghulam Ali Allana, a friend and confidant of Muhammad Ali Jinnah. Pyar Ali Allana was one of the founders of the Movement for Restoration of Democracy (MRD) and a member of the Pakistan Peoples Party. Ali Allana was 68 years old when he died on December 30, 2004.
