= Sajid Nawaz =

Pakistani politician

- ساجد نواز

Member of the National Assembly of Pakistan
- In office 1 June 2013 – 31 May 2018
- Preceded by: Noor Alam Khan
- Constituency: NA-3 (Peshawar-III)

Personal details
- Born: 25 March 1975 (age 51)
- Party: PTI (2013-present)

Sajid Nawaz Khan (Urdu: ساجد نواز خان; born 25 March 1975) is a Pakistani politician who had been a member of the National Assembly of Pakistan, from June 2013 to May 2018.

== Early life and education ==
Khan was born on 25 March 1975 to politician Haji Mohammad Nawaz.

He holds a degree of Master of Business Administration.

== Political career ==
He joined politics after the death of his father Haji Mohammad Nawaz.

Khan ran for the seat of Provincial Assembly of Khyber Pakhtunkhwa as an independent candidate from Constituency PK-07 (Peshawar-VII) in the 2008 Pakistani general election but was unsuccessful. He secured 2,038 and lost the seat to a candidate of Pakistan Peoples Party.

Khan later joined Pakistan Tehreek-e-Insaf (PTI) and was awarded a PTI ticket to run in the 2013 Pakistani general election despite opposition from the PTI chapter in Khyber Pakhtunkhwa. He was elected to the National Assembly of Pakistan as a candidate of PTI from Constituency NA-3 (Peshawar-III) in June 2013 election. He secured 66,528 votes and defeated Haji Ghulam Ali.
