= Fayyaz-ur-Rehman Alvi =

Pakistani politician

Fayyaz-ur-Rehman Alvi MNA

Member of the National Assembly of Pakistan
- In office 2002–2007
- Constituency: NA-3 (Peshawar-III)

Personal details
- Born: 1946 (age 79–80) Mansehra District
- Party: Muttahida Majlis-e-Amal (MMA)
- Education: Al-Azhar University
- Occupation: Politician

Religious life
- Religion: Islam
- Denomination: Sunni
- Institute: Darul Qurra Peshawar
- Founder of: Darul Qurra Peshawar

Fayyaz-ur-Rehman Alvi is a Pakistani politician who had been a member of the National Assembly of Pakistan from 2002 to 2007. He also founded Darul Qurra Faisrih at Ghabul Watan, Chakwal and served as wazir after Mohammad Nadir.

== See also ==
- List of Deobandis
