= Women Chamber of Commerce Quetta =

Trade body in city of Quetta, Pakistan

Women Chamber of Commerce & Industry
- اتاق تجارت و صنایع خواتین
- Abbreviation: WCCI
- Formation: 2010; 16 years ago
- Founder: Fehmida Kausar Jamali
- Type: Non-governmental trade association
- Headquarters: Quetta, Pakistan
- Region served: Quetta
- President: Uzma Khalid
- Website: Women Chamber of Commerce & Industry Quetta

Women Chamber of Commerce & Industry Quetta is a semi-governmental organization, approved and recognized by the Ministry of Commerce. It has its headquarters in Quetta, Pakistan. It is a non-political trade body affiliated with Federation of Pakistan Chambers of Commerce & Industry and promoting women entrepreneurs. WCCI Quetta is the premier body of trade and industry of Balochistan. WCCI Quetta is promoting the interests of Balochistan commercial & industrial community as well as economic activities.

It is also engaged among other things in assisting the entrepreneurs of Balochistan in developing capacity for sustainable trade promotion and industrial Developments supports infrastructures and access to market.

WCCI Quetta has more than 300 members.

== See also ==
- Quetta
- Economy of Pakistan
- Federation of Pakistan Chambers of Commerce & Industry
- International Chamber of Commerce

president of wqcci sonia kashmiri new appointment for new year 2020
