= NA-9 Malakand =

Constituency of the National Assembly of Pakistan

NA-9 (Malakand)
- Constituency for the National Assembly of Pakistan
- Region: Malakand District
- Electorate: 468,451

Current constituency
- Party: Pakistan Tehreek-e-Insaf
- Member: Junaid Akbar
- Created from: NA-35 (Malakand Protected Area)

NA-9 (Malakand) (این اے-9، مالاکنڈ) is a constituency for the National Assembly of Pakistan. It covers the whole of district Malakand. The constituency was formerly known as NA-35 (Malakand) from 1977 to 2018. The name changed to NA-8 (Malakand) after the delimitation in 2018 and NA-9 (Malakand) after the 2022 Delimitation.

== Members of Parliament ==
=== 1977–2002: NA-35 (Islamabad Capital Area) ===
Election	Member	Party
1977	Zahoor Ahmed	PPP
1985	M. Nawaz Khokhar	Independent
1988	Raja Pervez Khan	PPP
1990	M. Nawaz Khokhar	IJI
1993	M. Nawaz Khokhar	PML (N)
1997	Syed Zafar Ali Shah	PML (N)

=== 2002–2018: NA-35 (Malakand Protected Area) ===
Election	Member	Party
2002	Maulana Muhammad Inayat-ur-Rehman	MMA
2008	Lal Muhammad Khan	PPPP
2013	Junaid Akbar	PTI

=== 2018–2022: NA-8 (Malakand Protected Area) ===
Election	Member	Party
2018	Junaid Akbar	PTI

=== 2024–present: NA-9 Malakand ===
Election	Member	Party
2024	Junaid Akbar	PTI

== Elections since 2002 ==
=== 2002 general election ===
2002 General Election: NA-35 (Malakand Protected Area)
Party	Candidate	Votes	%	±%
MMA	Maulana Muhammad Inayat-ur-Rehman	37,663	54.13	
PPPP	Lal Muhammad Khan	17,538	25.21	
ANP	Bahr-e-Karam	5,167	7.43	
PML-Q	Muhammad Riaz Khan	5,161	7.42	
PTI	Nowsherwan Qasir	2,117	3.04	
PML-N	Ziaullah	1,930	2.77	
Majority		20,125	28.92	
Turnout		69,576	34.62	
MMA gain from PML-N				

A total of 1,915 votes were rejected.

=== 2008 general election ===
2008 General Election: NA-35 (Malakand Protected Area)
Party	Candidate	Votes	%	±%
PPPP	Lal Muhammad Khan	34,472	61.87	+36.66
MMA	Sahibzada Khalid Jan	5,555	9.97	−44.16
PML	Muhammad Riaz	5,462	9.80	
ANP	Ahmadullah	5,427	9.74	+2.31
PML-N	Sajjad Ahmad	4,800	8.62	+5.85
Majority		28,917	51.90	
Turnout		55,716	31.29	−3.33
PPPP gain from MMA				

A total of 2,380 votes were rejected.

=== 2013 general election ===
2013 General Election: NA-35 (Malakand Protected Area)
Party	Candidate	Votes	%	±%
PTI	Junaid Akbar	51,312	36.92	
JUI-F	Hafiz Muhammad Saeed	22,329	16.07	
PPPP	Lal Muhammad Khan	19,081	13.73	−48.14
PML-N	Fida Muhammad	18,207	13.10	+4.48
JI	Bakhtiar Maani	16,397	11.80	
ANP	Rahmat Shah Sael	8,709	6.26	−3.48
Tehreek-e-Pasmanada Awam Pakistan	Muhammad Ibrar	1,146	0.82	
Independent	Bacha Hussain	972	0.70	
Independent	Alamgir	411	0.30	
Independent	Ijazur Rahman	227	0.16	
Independent	Alhaj Muhammad Khan	193	0.14	
Majority		28,983	20.85	
Turnout		138,984	45.95	+14.66
PTI gain from PPPP				

A total of 4,362 votes were rejected.

=== 2018 general election ===
General elections were held on 25 July 2018.

Contest overview

Chairman of Pakistan Peoples Party, Bilawal Bhutto Zardari contested from this constituency and lost the election. Junaid Akbar of Pakistan Tehreek-e-Insaf was elected from this constituency in 2013 and retained the seat.

Results

General election 2018: NA-8 (Malakand Protected Area)
Party	Candidate	Votes	%	±%
PTI	Junaid Akbar	81,310	43.61	▲6.69
PPP	Bilawal Bhutto Zardari	43,724	23.45	▲9.72
MMA	Gul Naseeb Khan	31,379	16.83	▼11.04^{†}
Others	Others (ten candidates)	24,065	12.91	
Turnout		186,429	48.24	▲2.29
Rejected ballots		5,591	3.00	
Majority		37,586	20.16	
Registered electors		386,449		
PTI hold		Swing	N/A	

^{†}JI and JUI-F contested as part of MMA

=== 2024 general election ===
General elections were held on 8 February 2024. Junaid Akbar won the election with 113,545 votes.

General election 2024: NA-9 Malakand
Party	Candidate	Votes	%	±%
PTI	Junaid Akbar (Note: Filed nomination papers as PTI candidate but ECP allowed him to run as an Independent)	113,545	57.83	▲14.22
PPP	Syed Ahmad Ali Shah	40,785	20.77	▼2.68
JUI (F)	Kifayat Ullah	16,785	8.55	N/A
JI	Jamal Ud Din	16,268	8.29	N/A
Others	Others (eleven candidates)	8,971	4.57	
Turnout		202,083	43.14	▼5.10
Rejected ballots		5,729	2.83	
Majority		72,760	37.06	▲16.90
Registered electors		468,451		

== See also ==
- NA-8 Bajaur
- NA-10 Buner
