= Shahzad Malik =

Pakistani businessman

Shahzad Ali Malik
- Born: Shazhad Ali Malik
- Occupations: Politician, businessperson
- Title: Lahore Chamber of Commerce and Industry (President)
- Board member of: Rice Exporters Association of Pakistan
- Parent: Muhammad Shafi Malik
- Relatives: Iftikhar Ali Malik (brother)
- Awards: Sitara-i-Imtiaz Award

Shahzad Ali Malik is a Pakistani businessman. He is the CEO of the Guard Group of Industries. He has served as President of the Lahore Chamber of Commerce and Industry and Chairman of the Rice Exporters Association of Pakistan. He also serves as Central Chairman of the United Business Group.

== Career ==
Malik currently serves as Chief Executive Officer of the Guard Group of Industries. He was elected Chairman of the Rice Exporters Association of Pakistan (REAP) in 1999 and served until 2001. He later served as the vice-president of the Lahore Chamber of Commerce and Industry (LCCI) in 2004 and the president in 2011. In April 2022, he was appointed Central Chairman of the United Business Group (UBG).

== Awards ==
In 2013, the President of Pakistan Asif Ali Zardari awarded him the prestigious Sitara-e-Imtiaz (Star of Excellence), the third-highest civilian honour in Pakistan, in recognition of his research on hybrid rice for better yields.
