= Hafiz Hussain Ahmed =

Pakistani Islamic scholar and politician (1951–2025)

- حافظ حسین احمد

Personal life
- Born: 14 August 1951 (age 74) Pringabad Mastung, Balochistan, Pakistan
- Died: 19 March 2025 (aged 73–74)

Religious life
- Religion: Islam
- Denomination: Sunni

Member of the National Assembly of Pakistan
- In office 2002–2007
- In office 1988–1990
- Constituency: NA-260 Mastung

Member of the Senate of Pakistan
- In office March 1991 – March 1994

Personal details
- Party: Jamiat Ulama-e-Islam (December 1973 – 2025)
- Occupation: Islamic scholar Politician

Hafiz Hussain Ahmed (Urdu: حافظ حسین احمد; 1951 – 19 March 2025) was a Pakistani politician and Islamic scholar who twice served as member of the National Assembly of Pakistan from 2002 to 2007 and from 1988 to 1990 and also Member of the Senate of Pakistan from March 1991 to March 1994.

== Background ==
Hussain Ahmed was born in 1951 in a religious family of Quetta. He got his education in Arabic, Islamic literature, Quran, Hadith and Fiqh in early childhood. He was Deobandi and was also the holder of traditional Dars-i Nizami and Sanad in Hafiz-e-Quran.

Ahmed died from kidney failure on 19 March 2025.

== Political career ==
In early 1973, Ahmed started his political career from Balochistan at the provisional level and then at the national level, Thereafter he led important positions in Jamiat-e-Ulema-e-Islam and Pakistan National Alliance, and was also Deputy Parliamentary Leader in the National Assembly.
