= Benazir Income Support Programme =

Poverty reduction programme in Pakistan

- بینظیر انکم سپورٹ پروگرام
- Abbreviation: BISP
- Named after: Benazir Bhutto
- Formation: July 2008; 18 years ago
- Type: Social safety net
- Purpose: Health, Education, Social Protection, Reduce poverty, Enhance financial capacity of poor people
- Headquarters: F-Block, Pakistan Secretariat, Islamabad, Pakistan
- Methods: Donations, Scholarship
- Owner: Government of Pakistan
- Chairperson of BISP: Rubina Khalid
- Affiliations: Government of Pakistan
- Budget: US$ 1.15 Billion
- Employees: 2,381
- Website: bisp.gov.pk

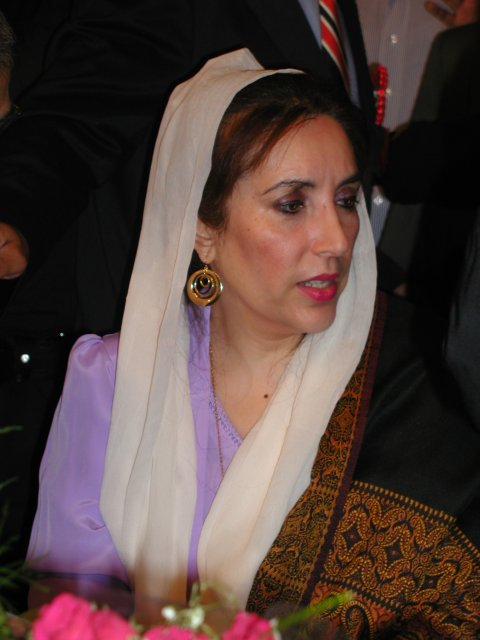
The program is named after Prime Minister Benazir Bhutto.

The Benazir Income Support Programme (BISP) is a federal unconditional cash transfer poverty reduction program in Pakistan. Launched in July 2008, it was the largest single social safety net program in the country with nearly Rs. 90 billion ($900 million) distributed to 5.4 million beneficiaries in 2016.

As of Budget 2025-26, the government has raised BISP’s allocation to Rs. 716 billion, about a 20% increase over the previous year. Also, the 8171 web portal has been relaunched/updated to provide users with eligibility checks, payment status and registration information online.

The program distributed Rs.19,33 8 (or approx. $195) per annum distributed per month in the year 2016. The stipend is linked to the Consumer Price Index and is paid through a smart card. The Department for International Development of the United Kingdom is the largest foreign backer of the program, providing $244 million (or 27%) of the total funds in 2016 with the Pakistani Government providing the rest.

A separate ministry, Ministry of Poverty Alleviation and Social Safety (PASS), was established and BISP was made part of the Poverty Alleviation and Social Security Division.

== History ==
The Benazir Income Support Programme was established in 2008 by Yousaf Raza Gillani who took the advice of President Asif Ali Zardari. The program's name is a tribute to former Prime Minister and wife of President Asif Ali Zardari, Benazir Bhutto, who was assassinated in 2007.

Since 2005, the purchasing power of many Pakistani families has been eroded by high inflation and the increasing cost of food and oil. BISP arose against this backdrop as a means to address reductions in purchasing power. Along with the economic development aims of the program, BISP also seeks to empower women by presenting cash transfers directly to female members of households.

BISP is currently the largest aid program in Pakistan and the government's third largest budgetary allocation. BISP spending accounts for 0.3% of Pakistan's GDP.

In the 2008–2009 fiscal year, more than 3 million Pakistani families received cash transfers through BISP; this figure accounts for 1.5% of the general population and 10% of the population below the poverty level. For the 2009–2010 fiscal year, the program was expanded to cover 5 million low-income families. At the program's start in 2008, the Pakistani government allocated Rs. 34 billion ($425 million) for BISP; the allocation doubled to Rs. 70 billion ($875 million) in the following year. By 2016, nearly Rs. 90 billion ($900 million) was distributed to 5.4 million beneficiaries. In the 2025–26 federal budget, the allocation was further increased to Rs. 716 billion, reflecting the government’s expanded commitment to poverty reduction and social protection.

The Benazir Income Support Programme is planning to launch a new initiative that encourages human capital development through a conditional cash transfer. The Waseela-e-Taleem initiative will condition cash payments on primary school enrolment for the children of eligible families.

In February 2026, a raise in financial aid for qualified women has been announced by the BISP in advance Ramadan. Chairperson Rubina Khalid revealed during a live e-court session at BISP headquarters that the Benazir Khawateen Kafalat Program had boosted the quarterly payment by Rs1,000, bringing the total amount to Rs14,500 per beneficiary. She added that in order to give mothers and children even more assistance, stipends under the Benazir Educational Scholarships and the Benazir Nashonuma Programme have been increased by Rs 500.

== Program structure ==
The Benazir Income Support Programme has been implemented in the provinces of Punjab, Sindh, Baluchistan, and Khyber-Pakhtunkhwa. The program also operates in the federally administered regions of Azad Jammu and Kashmir, and the Islamabad Capital Territory.

In its first year of operation, recipients of BISP cash transfers were identified and selected by Parliamentarians through a process of recommendation. Each Parliamentarian received 8,000 forms to distribute throughout his or her constituency. Selected individuals underwent an eligibility verification process through the National Database and Registration Authority. A final list of eligible families was generated and sent to the postal service. Funds were disbursed from the Treasury directly to the postal service and then delivered to the female head of eligible households.

In April 2009, the process for identifying and selecting eligible families through Parliamentarian recommendation was ended. The identification process has been reformed and now uses a Poverty Scorecard. Through the Poverty Scorecard, families are identified through a proxy means test. The Poverty Scorecard has been approved by the World Bank and requires families to answer 13 questions regarding assets and expenses in a survey. The poverty survey has been tested in 16 districts and will be distributed nationwide.

Internal monitoring systems are being developed to track deliveries and payment amounts to eligible families. Another mechanism to address corruption and political favouritism is being considered that would allow a neutral third party access to the list of eligible families to verify eligibility.

In 2011, BISP was expanded to include several special initiatives. The Benazir Kafaalat Program provides unconditional cash transfers to poor and deserving families. The Benazir Taleemi Wazaif Program supports the education of children by offering stipends to families who enroll their children in schools. The Nashonuma Program focuses on improving maternal and child health through nutritional support and awareness. BISP has also launched the 8171 Digital Wallet system, which allows beneficiaries to access quarterly cash payments of Rs. 13,500 in a transparent and convenient manner.

BISP also provides cash payments for emergency relief efforts. These payments are similar to the payments received by low-income families but are distributed to families affected by terrorism, war, and natural disasters such as earthquakes.

== Eligibility ==
To be eligible for cash payments under BISP, families must earn less than RS 25,000 per month; equivalent to $90. Further eligibility requirements stipulate that:

- Families must have a female applicant holding a valid ID card
- An individual applicant must be a widowed or divorced female without male family members
- Eligible families include those with physically or mentally disabled individuals

Families deemed ineligible for cash payments through BISP include those with:

- Members employed by the Pakistani government, army, or any other government-affiliated agency
- Members drawing a pension or receiving post-retirement benefits from the government
- Family members owning more than 3 acres of farmland or more than 80 square yards of residential land
- Members receiving income from other sources
- Members holding a machine readable passport
- Members with a National Identity Card for Overseas citizens
- Members with a bank account excluding microfinance banks and those catering to low-income families

== Benefits ==
Eligible families receive cash payments of 13,500 quarterly. This amount increases the purchasing power for families earning approximately RS 4500 each month by 20%. Most low-income families spend 50–70% of total income on food alone. According to BISP, the cash payment of RS 13,500 every quarter, or RS 4500 each month, will allow a family of 5–6 to purchase 20–25 days worth of flour.

== Criticism ==
Since the program's inception, critics have pointed out several overall flaws in the Benazir Income Support Program design. Some claim that the amount of RS 3000 bi-monthly, or RS 1,500 per month, is not enough to move impoverished families above the poverty line as this would require RS 2,550 per month. Another major flaw with BISP is its lack of conditionality. Conditional cash transfer programs in Latin America have experienced greater degrees of success because recipient families must meet certain requirements before receiving a cash payment. These programs build human capital through requiring recipients to enroll their children in primary education, participate in health and nutrition seminars, and visit health care providers. The BISP programmes also seems to be moving to this direction given that that Waseela-e-Taleem and Nashonuma component are both conditional requiring beneficiaries' to change both health and education seeking behaviour. The Unconditional Cash Transfer component of the BISP previously renamed Kifalat, is also being built up to encourage savings which would be matched by through government subsidies. Some experts have argued that attaching conditionalities to social safety net programmes moves them away from the conception of Negative Income Tax initially proposed by Milton Friedman by assuming that it is behaviour on part of the beneficiaries which is to blame for their poverty while ignoring deep rooted structural inequalities in society which may limit individual's ability to effectively participate in the labour Market. One such example from Pakistan is that of transgender people who would be restricted from accessing the labour market in any meaningful manner unless the society around them changes.

There have also been accusations of corruption and political favouritism. By some estimates, only 50–60 percent of beneficiaries actually receive cash payments from BISP. The previous method of identifying families through the recommendation of Parliamentarians was flawed. Many have claimed that Parliamentarians simply recommended their own family and friends to receive cash payments. It has been pointed out that there is a disproportionate number of families receiving BISP aid in geographic areas where the ruling Pakistan People's Party dominates. For example, in the Prime Minister's hometown of Multan, there is twice the number of people receiving BISP payments than in Lahore, the opposition party's stronghold. Punjab, another area where opposition parties dominate, has the lowest ratio of eligible families—1,974 for every 100,000 people; versus 6,829 families for every 100,000 people in Sindh, the ruling party's stronghold. Beneficiaries have also complained that the postal service charges an additional RS 100 to RS 200 for each delivery of payment.

Other critics have argued that as the Benazir Income Support Programme makes up a substantial portion of the Pakistani government's budget, impact evaluations should be conducted to evaluate the benefits and actual need for the program.

== List of chairpersons ==
Name of Chairperson	Entered Office	Left Office
Farzana Raja	July 2008	March 2013
Vacant	March 2013	November 2013
Enver Baig	November 2013	November 2014
Vacant	November 2014	February 2015
Marvi Memon	February 2015	June 2018
Vacant	June 2018	October 2018
Sania Nishtar	October 2018	April 2022
Shazia Marri	April 2022	9 May 2024
Rubina Khalid	9 May 2024	Incumbent
