= NA-28 Peshawar-I =

Constituency of the National Assembly of Pakistan

- Constituency for the National Assembly of Pakistan
- Region: Mathra Tehsil, Shah Alam Tehsil (partly) and Peshawar City Tehsil of Peshawar District
- Electorate: 396,045

Current constituency
- Party: Jamiat Ulema-e-Islam (F)
- Member: Noor Alam Khan
- Created from: NA-2 (Peshawar-II); NA-3 (Peshawar-III)

NA-28 Peshawar-I (این اے-28، پشاور-١) is a constituency that elects one member to the National Assembly of Pakistan.

== Area ==
During the delimitation of 2018, NA-27 (Peshawar-I) acquired areas from NA-2 (Peshawar-II) and NA-3 (Peshawar-III), the areas of Peshawar which are part of this constituency are listed below alongside the former constituency name from which they were acquired:

Areas acquired from NA-2 (Peshawar-II)

- Palusi Attuzai
- Palusi Maqdarzai
- Palusi Talarzai

Areas acquired from NA-3 (Peshawar-III)

- Eid Gah Colony
- Hassan Garhi
- Tableeghi Markaz
- Darmagi
- Irrigation Colony Warsak Road
- Mathra (excluding Reggi Lalma and Reggi Ufatazai)
- Mahal Salu
- Bunyadi
- Isa Khel Hamid
- Laram
- Babu Zai
- Khazana
- Haryana Payan

== Members of Parliament ==
=== 1970–1977: NW-3 Peshawar-III ===
| Election | Member | Party |
|---|---|---|
| 1970 | Abdul Wali Khan | NAP |

=== 1977–2002: NA-3 Peshawar-III ===
| Election | Member | Party |
|---|---|---|
| 1977 | Aftab Ahmad Khan Sherpao | PPP |
| 1985 | Hameed Khan | Independent |
| 1988 | Sardar Ali Khan | PPP |
| 1990 | Arbab Muhammad Zahir | ANP |
| 1993 | Arbab Muhammad Zahir | ANP |
| 1997 | Arbab Saadullah Khan | ANP |

=== 2002–2018: NA-3 Peshawar-III ===
| Election | Member | Party |
|---|---|---|
| 2002 | Qari Fayyaz-ur-Rehman Alvi | MMA |
| 2008 | Noor Alam Khan | PPPP |
| 2013 | Sajid Nawaz | PTI |

=== 2018–2022: NA-27 Peshawar-I ===
| Election | Member | Party |
|---|---|---|
| 2018 | Noor Alam Khan | PTI |

=== 2023–present: NA-28 Peshawar-I ===
| Election | Member | Party |
|---|---|---|
| 2024 | Noor Alam Khan | JUI(F) |

== Elections since 2002 ==
=== 2002 general election ===
2002 General Election: NA-3 (Peshawar-III)
| Party | Candidate | Votes | % | ±% |
|---|---|---|---|---|
| MMA | Qari Fayyaz-ur-Rehman Alvi | 33,567 | 49.84 | |
| PPPP | Kiramat Ullah Khan | 14,662 | 21.77 | |
| National Alliance | Arbab Muhammad Ayub Jan | 8,838 | 13.12 | |
| PML-N | Iqbal Zafar Jhagra | 5,956 | 8.84 | |
| PPP (S) | Hidayatullah Khan | 3,403 | 5.05 | |
| PAT | Saleem Akbar Khan | 748 | 1.11 | |
| Independent | Akhtar Ali Khan Nahaqi | 183 | 0.27 | |
| Majority | | 18,905 | 28.07 | |
| Turnout | | 67,357 | 30.63 | |
| MMA gain from ANP | | | | |

A total of 1,955 votes were rejected.

=== 2008 general election ===
2008 General Election: NA-3 (Peshawar-III)
| Party | Candidate | Votes | % | ±% |
|---|---|---|---|---|
| PPPP | Noor Alam Khan | 27,038 | 29.75 | +7.98 |
| ANP | Muhammad Hasham Babar | 26,201 | 28.82 | |
| MMA | Aziz ud Din | 17,383 | 19.12 | −30.72 |
| PML-N | Iqbal Zafar Jhagra | 12,096 | 13.31 | +4.47 |
| PML | Muhammad Intikhab Khan | 5,679 | 6.25 | |
| Independent | Taimoor Khan | 2,071 | 2.28 | |
| Independent | Arbab Roohullah Khan | 342 | 0.38 | |
| Independent | Ajmal Khan Afridi | 85 | 0.09 | |
| Majority | | 837 | 0.93 | |
| Turnout | | 90,895 | 36.25 | +5.62 |
| PPPP gain from MMA | | | | |

A total of 2,566 votes were rejected.

=== 2013 general election ===
2013 General Election: NA-3 (Peshawar-III)
| Party | Candidate | Votes | % | ±% |
|---|---|---|---|---|
| PTI | Sajid Nawaz | 66,528 | 38.31 | |
| JUI-F | Haji Ghulam Ali | 27,987 | 16.12 | |
| PML-N | Iqbal Zafar Jhagra | 22,370 | 12.88 | −0.43 |
| PPPP | Noor Alam Khan | 22,045 | 12.70 | −17.05 |
| JI | Israr Ullah | 11,954 | 6.88 | |
| Independent | Muhammad Hasham Babar | 6,449 | 3.71 | |
| ANP | Arbab Inam Ullah Khan | 5,902 | 3.40 | |
| TTP | Aman Ullah Khan | 2,202 | 1.27 | |
| QWP (S) | Muhammad Zaman | 2,157 | 1.24 | |
| PML | Shoukat Ali Khan | 1,337 | 0.77 | |
| Independent | Malik Firdos Khan | 1,228 | 0.71 | |
| Independent | Sardar Ali | 743 | 0.43 | |
| Independent | Fiza Tariq | 679 | 0.39 | |
| Independent | Muhammad Fayyaz Khan | 585 | 0.34 | |
| Independent | Mst. Tabana | 535 | 0.31 | |
| MQM | Malik Javed Khan | 475 | 0.27 | |
| Independent | Umer Said Khan | 471 | 0.27 | |
| Majority | | 38,541 | 22.19 | |
| Turnout | | 173,647 | 46.30 | +10.05 |
| PTI gain from PPPP | | | | |

A total of 5,276 votes were rejected.

=== 2018 general election ===
General elections were held on 25 July 2018.

General election 2018: NA-27 (Peshawar-I)
| Party | Candidate | Votes | % | ±% |
|---|---|---|---|---|
| PTI | Noor Alam Khan | 71,158 | 46.03 | ▲7.72 |
| MMA | Haji Ghulam Ali | 39,310 | 25.43 | ▲9.31 |
| PPP | Asma Arbab Alamgir | 24,002 | 15.53 | ▲2.83 |
| Others | Others (seven candidates) | 14,691 | 9.50 | |
| Turnout | | 154,598 | 45.83 | ▼0.47 |
| Rejected ballots | | 5,437 | 3.51 | |
| Majority | | 31,848 | 20.60 | |
| Registered electors | | 337,329 | | |
| PTI hold | | Swing | N/A | |

=== 2024 general election ===
General elections were held on 8 February 2024. Noor Alam Khan won the election with 138,389 votes.

General election 2024: NA-28 Peshawar-I
| Party | Candidate | Votes | % | ±% |
|---|---|---|---|---|
| JUI (F) | Noor Alam Khan | 138,389 | 57.39 | N/A |
| Independent | Sajid Nawaz (Note: Filed nomination papers as PTI candidate but ECP allowed him to run as an Independent) | 65,119 | 27.00 | ▼19.03 |
| PPP | Kiramat Ullah Khan | 14,830 | 6.15 | ▼9.38 |
| Others | Others (ten candidates) | 22,785 | 9.45 | |
| Turnout | | 245,802 | 62.06 | ▲16.23 |
| Rejected ballots | | 4,679 | 1.90 | |
| Majority | | 73,270 | 30.39 | |
| Registered electors | | 396,045 | | |
| JUI (F) gain from PTI | | | | |

== See also ==
- NA-27 Khyber
- NA-29 Peshawar-II
