= SAARC Chamber of Commerce and Industry =

SAARC Chamber of Commerce & Industry
- Abbreviation: SAARC CCI
- Formation: 1992; 34 years ago
- Founder: S.M Inam
- Type: Non-governmental trade association
- Purpose: Policy advocacy
- Location: Islamabad, Pakistan
- Coordinates: 28°37′38″N 77°13′54″E
- Region served: South Asian Association for Regional Cooperation countries
- Services: Business promotion, networking, policy reforms
- Members: 1,500
- Key people: Jashim Uddin (President); Ugen Tsechup (Senior Vice President); Zulfiqar Ali Butt (Secretary General)
- Employees: 20
- Website: saarcchamber.org

SAARC Chamber of Commerce and Industry, is a regional apex trade body recognised by the South Asian Association for Regional Cooperation (SAARC). This is a constellation of the eight national Federation Chambers of Commerce and Industry of the member states of SAARC.

The rationale behind the creation of SAARC Chamber of Commerce and Industry of the SAARC countries was to promote trade and industry in the region and to develop and achieve common objectives in the areas of trade and industry, moreover, the SAARC Chamber of Commerce and Industry is also accepted as the voice of the private sector across the region.

== History ==
In December 1992, pursuant to the directive of SAARC Secretariat, SAARC Chamber of Commerce & Industry, assisted by the National Federations, submitted its draft constitution to the SAARC Secretariat and received its approval. This signified the official recognition of the SAARC Chamber of Commerce and Industry (SAARC CCI) by all the national governments of SAARC as the apex body of all the National Federations of Chambers of Commerce and Industry of SAARC, namely:

- Afghanistan Chamber of Commerce & Industry
- Bangladesh Chambers of Commerce & Industry
- Bhutan Chamber of Commerce & Industry
- Federation of Indian Chambers of Commerce & Industry
- Maldives National Chamber of Commerce & Industry
- Federation of Nepalese Chambers of Commerce & Industry
- Federation of Pakistan Chambers of Commerce & Industry
- Federation of Chambers of Commerce and Industry of Sri Lanka
