= Malik Rashid Ahmed Khan =

Pakistani politician

Senator Malik Rashid Ahmed Khan ملک رشید احمد خان

Chairperson- Senate Committee of Overseas Pakistanis and Human Resource Development
- Incumbent
- Assumed office March 2009
- President: Mamnoon Hussain
- Prime Minister: Nawaz Sharif

Personal details
- Born: Malik Rashid Ahmed Khan
- Party: Independent
- Education: B.E.(Civil)
- Occupation: Politician

Malik Rashid Ahmed Khan (Urdu: ملک رشید احمد خان) is a Pakistani Politician and Member of Senate of Pakistan, currently serving as Chairperson- Senate Committee of Overseas Pakistanis and Human Resource Development.

== Political career ==
He belongs to FATA region of Pakistan, and was elected to the Senate of Pakistan in March 2009 on a general seat from FATA as Independent candidate. He is the chairperson of Senate Committee of Overseas Pakistanis and Human Resource Development and member of senate committees of States and Frontier Regions, Federal Education and Professional Training, Kashmir Affairs & Gilgit Baltistan and Select Committee.

== See also ==
- List of Senators of Pakistan
- List of committees of the Senate of Pakistan
