= Muhammad Ali Durrani =

Former Federal Minister & Senior Pakistani Politician

Member of the Senate of Pakistan
- In office March 2006 – March 2012
- In office March 2003 – March 2006

Federal Minister of Information and Broadcasting
- In office 26 April 2006 – 19 June 2007
- President: Pervez Musharraf
- Prime Minister: Shaukat Aziz
- Preceded by: Sheikh Rasheed Ahmad
- Succeeded by: Tariq Azim Khan

Special Advisor to Prime Minister
- In office 19 November 2005 – 26 April 2006
- Prime Minister: Shaukat Aziz

Minister of State for Sports, Culture and Youth Affairs
- In office 5 September 2004 – 26 April 2006
- President: Pervez Musharraf
- Prime Minister: Shaukat Aziz

Personal details
- Born: Bahawalpur, Punjab, Pakistan
- Party: GDA (2025-present)
- Other political affiliations: PML(F) (2012-2025); PML(Q) (2004-2013); Millat Party (1998-2004); Pasban-e-Pakistan (1994-1998); JI (1988-1994)
- Education: BSc (Mechanical engineering)

Muhammad Ali Durrani is a Pakistani politician and former federal minister who had been a member of the Senate of Pakistan from 2003 to 2012.

== Political career ==
He started a political career by joining Islami Jamiat Talaba Pakistan. He became the Nazim of KPK (Formerly NWFP) and Punjab. After which he joined Pasban Pakistan. He later joined Millat Party. In Musharraf government, Millat Party merged with Pakistan Muslim League (Q) (PML-Q).

He was elected to the Senate of Pakistan as a candidate of PML-Q and held several key positions including Chairman Standing Committee of Commerce, Special Advisor to Prime Minister of Pakistan, Minister for State for Sports, Culture and Youth Affairs, Chairman National Volunteer Movement and Federal Minister Information and Broadcasting. He remained member of the Senate of Pakistan from 2003 to 2012. In 2013, he joined Pakistan Muslim League (F) and briefly served as its secretary general.
