= Ratna Bhagwandas Chawla =

Pakistani politician

Member of the Senate of Pakistan
- In office March 2006 – March 2012

Personal details
- Party: Pakistan Peoples Party

Ratna Bhagwandas Chawla is a politician of the Pakistan Peoples Party and the first Hindu woman elected to the Senate of Pakistan. She was elected on Women Reserved seat.
