= Farzana Raja =

Pakistani politician

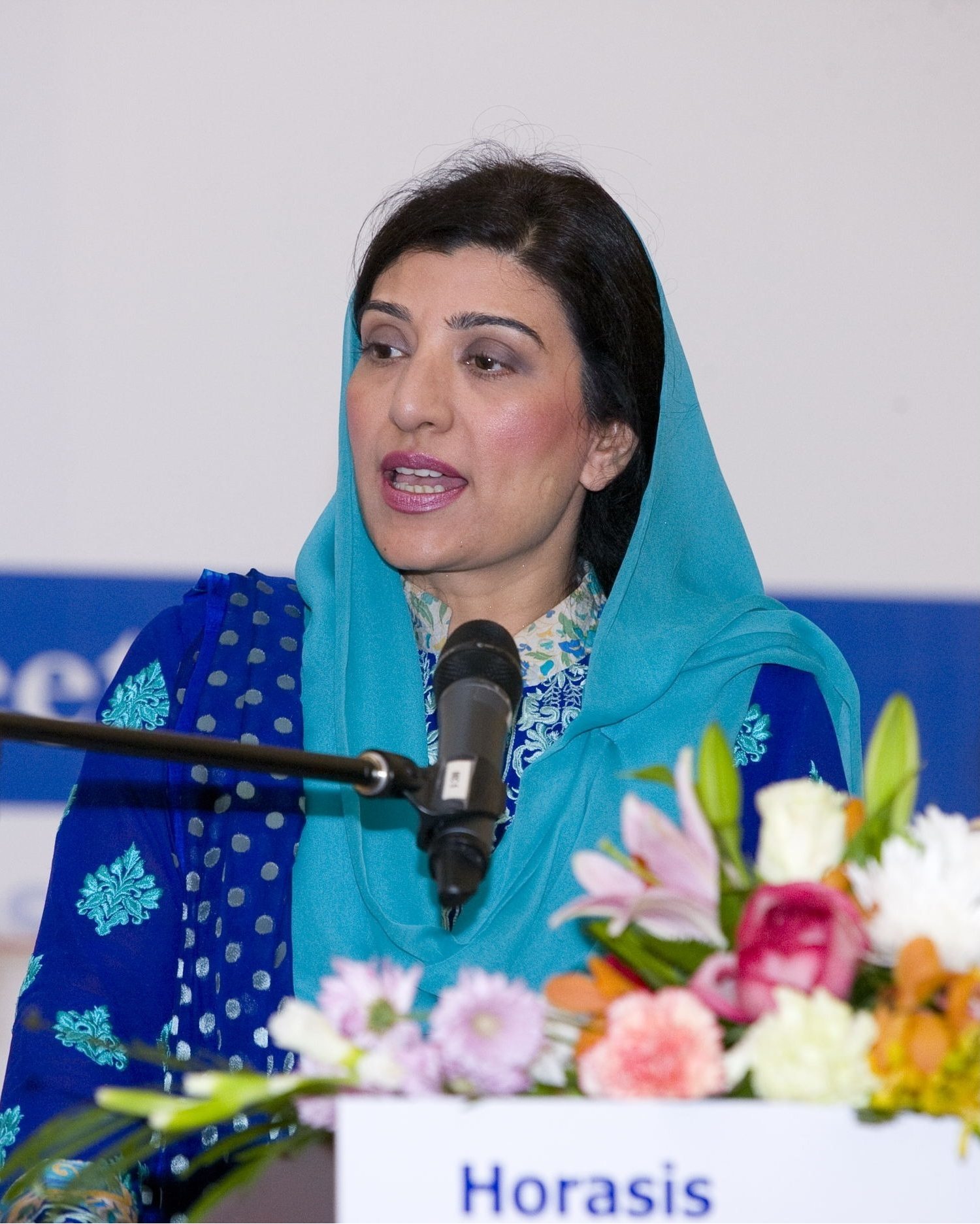

Chairperson of the Benazir Income Support Programme
- In office 2008–2013
- Prime Minister: Yousaf Raza Gillani; Raja Pervez Ashraf

Member of the National Assembly of Pakistan
- In office 2008–2013
- Constituency: Reserved seat for women

Personal details
- Born: 2 January 1970 (age 56) Gujar Khan, Punjab, Pakistan
- Party: Pakistan Peoples Party

Farzana Raja is a Pakistani politician who served as chair of the Benazir Income Support Programme and has been a Member of the National Assembly of Pakistan. Farzana Raja has retired from politics in 2013. She has made a YouTube channel to spread awareness on various social issues. Farzana Raja has successfully established her real estate business in multiple states in the United States Of America and has devoted an effort to develop local communities.

== Early life and education ==
She was born in Gujar Khan on 2 January 1970. She received her early education from Government High School in Chaklala, Rawalpindi and completed her college education from Viqar-u-Nisa College in Rawalpindi before obtaining a bachelor's degree from Punjab University in 1989. She has completed her Post Graduate Diploma in Humanitarian Action and Peace building from United Nations Institute of research/Oxford Brooks University UK.

== Political career ==
She was elected to the Provincial Assembly of Punjab as a candidate of Pakistan Peoples Party on a reserved seat for women in the 2002 Pakistani general election.

She was elected to the National Assembly of Pakistan as a candidate of Pakistan Peoples Party on a reserved seat for women from Punjab in the 2008 Pakistani general election.

She became chairwoman of the Benazir Income Support Programme in 2008.

In 2012, she was inducted into the federal cabinet of Prime Minister Yousuf Raza Gilani without portfolio and was give the status of a federal minister. She was retained in the federal cabinet of incoming Prime Minister Raja Pervez Ashraf.
