= Shahzada Alam Monnoo =

Pakistani politician

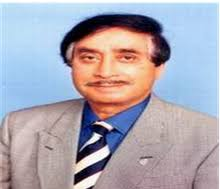

Federal Minister of Commerce, Textile Industry, Privatization and Investment
- In office 15 November 2007 – 25 March 2008
- President: Pervaiz Musharraf

Personal details
- Born: 1936 Pakistan
- Died: 18 November 2014 Lahore, Pakistan
- Occupation: Industrialist

Shahzada Alam Monnoo (1936 – 18 November 2014) was a Pakistani industrialist and politician. He served in the cabinet of Pakistan as Minister of Commerce and Textile Industry, Privatization and Investment between 15 November 2007 and 25 March 2008. He died on 18 November 2014.

== Early life and career ==
Monnoo was born in 1936 into the Chinioti business clan. He studied in Welham Boys School, Dehradun in British India and moved to Pakistan in 1947 when it and India became independent. He attended Aitchison College in Lahore and later the College of Textiles at North Carolina State College, North Carolina, United States.

In 1965 he introduced the first Toyota Motors assembly plant in Karachi, then known as Monnoo Toyota Motors. The industry was nationalized by Zulfiqar Ali Bhutto in 1972, along with many others. Monnoo had become highly influential in the textile sector in Pakistan, becoming the president of Monnoo Group, which owns nearly 20 mills in Faisalabad and other locations in Pakistan and had served as chairman of the APTMA (All Pakistan Textile Mills Association) and was the founding member of Lahore Chamber of Commerce and Industry.

Monnoo was Minister for Commerce, Trade and Industry in the caretaker government of Prime Minister Muhammad Mian Soomro. He was Chairman, All Pakistan Textile Mills Association (APTMA) and a former President of the Lahore Chamber of Commerce and Industry.

== Death ==
Monnoo died on Tuesday 18 November 2014 in Lahore. His son, Shahbaz, married the Zaima of industrialist Syed Wajid Ali.
