= Noor Alam Khan =

Pakistani politician

- نور عالم خان

Member of the National Assembly of Pakistan
- Incumbent
- Assumed office 29 February 2024
- In office 13 August 2018 – 10 August 2023
- Constituency: NA-27 (Peshawar-I)
- In office 2008–2013

Personal details
- Born: October 12, 1972 (age 53) Peshawar, Khyber Pakhtunkhwa, Pakistan
- Party: JUI (F) (2023-present)
- Other political affiliations: PTI (2018-2022); PPP (2008-2018)

Noor Alam Khan (Pashto/Urdu: نور عالم خان) is a Pakistani politician who had been a member of the National Assembly of Pakistan from August 2018 till August 2023. Previously, he was a member of the National Assembly from 2008 to 2013. He was a member of the Pakistan Tehreek-e-Insaf (PTI) from 2018 to 2022 and the Pakistan Peoples Party (PPP) from 2008 to 2018.

He was one of the 14 dissident members of the ruling PTI who were given show-cause notices by the PTI for allying with the opposition before the no-confidence motion against Imran Khan in 2022. He is accused of changing loyalties with Pakistan Tehreek-e-insaf regardless of winning from the party ticket accused of being a part of the horse-trading that went on in the Sindh house Islamabad to oust Imran Khan out of office.

In 2022, shortly after dissenting from PTI, he was elected as the Chairman of the Public Accounts Committee (PAC).

He joined Jamiat Ulema-e-Islam (F) (JUI-F) and elected Member of National Assembly in February 2024.

== Personal life ==
Noor Alam Khan was born on October 12, 1972, in the village of Haryana Payan, close to Peshawar. He graduated from the University of the Punjab in 2002. He is married and has one daughter and two sons. His uncle, Haji Muhammad Nawaz, was elected to the provincial assembly in 1988. His hobbies include hunting and horseback riding.

In 2012, he was named the richest known member of the National Assembly of Pakistan, with his declared assets being more than PKR 32 billion (back then equivalent to around $342 million). He owned 200 acres of prime land (for PKR 160 million per acre) in Peshawar, gold ornaments worth PKR 11.6 million, two vehicles, and a house.

== Political career ==
=== Early career ===
He was elected to the National Assembly of Pakistan from Constituency NA-3 (Peshawar-III) as a candidate of the Pakistan Peoples Party (PPP) in the 2008 Pakistani general election. He received 27,038 votes and defeated Babar of the Awami National Party (ANP). During the tenure, he served as the federal parliamentary secretary for commerce.

=== Pakistan Peoples Party (2008-2018) ===
He contested the 2013 Pakistani general election from NA-3 (Peshawar-III) as a candidate of the Pakistan Peoples Party (PPP) but stood fourth by obtaining 22,045 votes.

=== Pakistan Tehreek-e-Insaf (2018-2022) ===
He was re-elected to the National Assembly as a candidate of the Pakistan Tehreek-e-Insaf (PTI) from Constituency NA-27 (Peshawar-I) in the 2018 Pakistani general election. He received 71,158 votes and defeated Haji Ghulam Ali of the Muttahida Majlis-e-Amal (MMA). He was one of several dissident members of the ruling PTI who had said they would vote against their party's chairman, Prime Minister of Pakistan Imran Khan, in the no-confidence motion against him. However, they did not have to vote at the end as the opposition alliance, the Pakistan Democratic Movement (PDM), managed to gather enough votes by itself to oust prime minister Imran Khan on 10 April 2022.

On 23 December 2023, he decided to join the Jamiat Ulema-e-Islam (F) (JUI(F)).

=== Jamiat Ulema-e-Islam (F) (2023-2025) ===
He was re-elected to the National Assembly of Pakistan as a candidate JUI (F) from constituency NA-28 Peshawar-I in the 2024 Pakistani general election, he received 59,78 votes and defeated Independent politician candidate supported (PTI) Pakistan Tehreek-e-Insaf, Sajid Nawaz.
