= Nisar Memon =

Pakistani politician

Nisar Memon نثار میمڻ
- In office March 2003 – March 2009
- President: Pervez Musharraf; Asif Ali Zardari
- Prime Minister: Shaukat Aziz; Yousaf Raza Gillani

Information and Broadcasting
- In office 1993, 2002 and 2007

Kashmir Affairs and Northern Areas and State and Frontier Regions
- In office 1993 and 2002

Personal details
- Born: 31 December 1942 (age 83) Karachi, Sind Province, British India
- Other political affiliations: Pakistan Muslim League (Q)
- Children: Marvi Memon (daughter)

Nisar Memon (born 31 December 1942; Sindhi: نثار ميمڻ) is a politician from Karachi, Sindh, Pakistan. He was a member of the Senate of Pakistan, belonging to Pakistan Muslim League (Q) during the Pervez Musharraf regime in Pakistan.

His daughter, Marvi Memon, was a member of the National Assembly of Pakistan.

== Background ==
Nisar Memon holds a Master of Science degree from Karachi University. Before joining the Senate of Pakistan, he was the Federal Minister for Information and Broadcasting (in 1993 and again in 2002), the Federal Minister for Kashmir Affairs and Northern Areas during 1993 and 2002, the Country General Manager for IBM Corporation (1989–1999) and the Chairman of the Board of Directors for Engro Group of Pakistan (2001–2002). He has been a member of the Board of Directors for Pakistan State Oil, American Life Insurance Company, and Capital Asset Leasing Company. He was the president of Pakistan's Overseas Investors Chamber of Commerce and Industry in 1994.

== Senate career ==
As Senator, he was the Chairperson of the Standing Committee of the Senate on Defence and Defence Production and the Parliamentary Committee on Water Resources. He was a member of the Standing Committees of the Senate on Foreign Affairs, Finance and Economic Affairs and Housing and Environment Committee. He continues to be a Member of the Board of Governors at the National University of Computer and Emerging Sciences, Islamabad.

== Current engagement ==
Nisar Memon is the founding president of Amanat Foundation which has launched Pakistan Literacy Project (PLP).

== Personal life ==
Nisar Memon has a wife and two children: daughter Marvi Memon who was born in 1972, was elected as a member of National Assembly of Pakistan in the 2008 Pakistani general election on reserved seats for women.
