= Saeed Ahmed Hashmi =

Pakistani politician

Member of the Senate of Pakistan
- Incumbent
- Assumed office March 2021
- In office March 2006 – March 2012
- In office 2003–2006

Member of the Provincial Assembly of Balochistan
- In office 1997–1999
- Constituency: PB-3 (Quetta-III)
- In office 1993–1996
- Constituency: PB-3 (Quetta-III)
- In office 1988–1990
- Constituency: PB-3 (Quetta-III)

Personal details
- Party: BAP (2018-present)
- Other political affiliations: PML(Q) (2018); PMLN (1993-2018); IJI (1998-199)
- Spouse: Ruquiya Saeed Hashmi
- Occupation: Politician

Saeed Ahmed Hashmi is a Pakistani politician who has been a Member of the Senate of Pakistan, since March 2021.

== Political career ==
Hashmi was first elected as senator in 2003 and reelected as a candidate of Pakistan Muslim League (Q) on seats for Technocrats/Ulema in the 2006 Pakistani Senate elections and served till March 2012.

In 2018, Hashmi along with some dissident Balochistan based leaders from PML-N and PML-Q founded Balochistan Awami Party.

He was re-elected as senator as a candidate of Balochistan Awami Party on seats for Technocrats/Ulema in the 2021 Pakistani Senate elections.

He also thrice elected as MPA of Balochistan Assembly from his constituency PB-3 (Quetta-III) from 1988 to 1990, 1993-1996 and 1997-1999 and also served as provincial minister.
