= Mohammad Akram =

Mohammad or Muhammad Akram is the name of:

== Cricketers ==
- Mohammad Akram (Islamabad cricketer) (born 1974), Pakistani test cricketer
- Mohammad Akram (Sindh cricketer) (born 1956), Pakistani first-class cricketer
- Mohammad Akram (Lahore Division cricketer) (born 1964), Pakistani first-class cricketer
- Muhammad Akram (blind cricketer), Pakistani blind cricketer

== Others ==
- Muhammad Akram (1941–1971), Pakistani army officer
- Mohammad Akram (rower) (born 1971), Pakistani Olympic rower who competed in the 2000 Summer Olympics
- Mohammad Akram (general) (died 2005), Vice Chief of Staff of the Afghan National Army, killed by a suicide bomb attack
- Choudhary Mohammad Akram, Indian politician

== See also ==
- Akram Dashti (assumed office 2018), member of the Senate of Pakistan
- Mohammad Akram Khpalwāk (active 2006–2014), Afghan politician
