= Abdul Raziq (politician) =

Pakistani politician

Senator of Pakistan
- In office March 2006 – March 2012
- Constituency: FATA

Personal details
- Party: Independent

Abdul Raziq is a Pakistani politician who served as a Senator from March 2006 to March 2012. He was an independent and represented the Federally Administered Tribal Areas (FATA) in the Senate of Pakistan.
