= State Finance Accountability Committee =

The State Finance Accountability Committee (Indonesian: Badan Akuntabilitas Keuangan Negara (BAKN)) is an auditory body of the legislative branch in Indonesia's political system and was established under Paragraph 6 of Indonesian Law No.27 2009 enacted on 29 August 2009.

The BAKN has the tasks of:

- a. undertaking scrutiny of the findings of audit results of the BPK which have been transmitted to the Indonesian Peoples Representative Council (DPR);
- b. transmitting the results of its scrutiny under letter a to the commissions;
- c. following up the results of commission discussions on findings of the audit results of the BPK at the request of the commissions;
- d. giving input to the BPK in the matters of the annual audit work plan, audit impediments, as well as the presentation and quality of reports (Clause 113).
- In undertaking the task under letter c, BAKN can request explanations from the BPK, the Government, regional government, other state institutions, the Bank of Indonesia, state enterprises, general service bodies, regional enterprises and other institutions and bodies which manage state finances (Clause 113[2]).
- BAKN can recommend to the commissions that BPK undertake follow up audits (Clause 113[3]).
- The results of work under a, b and d are transmitted to the DPR leadership at a plenary meeting on a periodic basis (Clause 113[4]).
- In implementing its tasks, BAKN can be assisted by accountants, experts, financial analysts and/or researchers (Clause 114).

BAKN is to prepare a draft budget for the implementation of its tasks in accordance with its needs which is then transmitted to the Household Affairs Board (Clause 115). Further requirements about the manner of BAKN's formation, composition, tasks, authority and work mechanisms are regulated by DPR regulations on order (Clause 116).

== See also ==
- Politics of Indonesia
