= Semeen Yusuf Siddiqui =

Pakistani politician

Senator of Pakistan
- In office March 2006 – March 2012
- Constituency: Sindh

Personal details
- Political party: Pakistan Muslim League (PML)

Semeen Yusuf Siddiqui is a Pakistani politician who served as a Senator from March 2006 to March 2012. She is a member of the Pakistan Muslim League (PML) and represented the province of Sindh in the Senate of Pakistan.
