= Rahat Hussain =

Pakistani politician

Maulana Rahat Hussain

Senator of Pakistan
- In office March 2003 – March 2009

Personal details
- Party: Muttahida Majlis-e-Amal (MMA)

Maulana Rahat Hussain is a Pakistani politician who served as a Senator from March 2003 to March 2009. He was elected to the Senate of Pakistan as a member of the Muttahida Majlis-e-Amal (MMA) party, representing the general seat.
