= Abdul Ghaffar Qureshi =

Pakistani politician and businessman

Senator of Pakistan
- In office March 2006 – March 2012
- Constituency: Sindh

Federal Minister for Law, Justice and Parliamentary Affairs
- In office ?–?

Personal details
- Party: Pakistan Muslim League (PML)

Abdul Ghaffar Qureshi is a Pakistani politician and businessman. He served as a senator from March 2006 to March 2012, representing the province of Sindh and the Pakistan Muslim League (PML) party. He also held the position of Federal Minister for Law, Justice and Parliamentary Affairs.
