= Zafar Iqbal Chaudhry =

Pakistani politician and entrepreneur

Zafar Iqbal Chaudhry is a Pakistani politician and entrepreneur. He started his political career in 1987 when he was elected as the Vice Chairman for district Bahawalnagar. In 1993 he was elected as member of the provincial assembly from Haroonabad, Bahawalnagar and in 1997 he was elected as the Chairman for district Bahawalnagar. In 2003 he became a member of the Senate. As a senator he also served as the chairman of standing committees for sports, tourism and culture.

Chaudhry is one of the founding members of the Pakistan Industrial and Traders Association Front and also an active member of Lahore Chamber of Commerce & Industry. He was elected President in 2010. In 2012, Chaudhry started the first private train service in Pakistan, Pak Business Express, running from Lahore to Karachi.
