= Afia Zia =

Pakistani politician

Senator of Pakistan
- In office March 2006 – March 2012
- Constituency: KPK

Personal details
- Political party: Jamaat-e-Islami (JI)

Afia Zia is a Pakistani politician who served as a Senator from March 2006 to March 2012. She is a member of the Jamaat-e-Islami (JI) and represented the province of KPK in the Senate of Pakistan.
