= Abbas Kumaili =

Pakistani politician (1942–2019)

Abbas Kumaili (1942–2019) was a Pakistani politician, first-class cricketer, and scholar of Shia Islam. He was a member of the Senate of Pakistan from 2003 to 2009. He was also the founder and chief of Jafaria Alliance.

Kumaili received his education from St. Patrick's College. Later, he played first-class cricket until 1966.
