= Rukhsana Zuberi =

Pakistani politician

Senator Rukhsana Zuberi

Member of the Senate of Pakistan
- Incumbent
- Assumed office 12 March 2018
- In office March 2003 – February 2009

Personal details
- Party: Pakistan Peoples Party

Rukhsana Zuberi is a Pakistani politician who has been a Member of the Senate of Pakistan, since March 2018. Previously she had been a member of the Senate from 2003 to 2009 and briefly served as a member of the Provincial Assembly of Sindh in 1977.

== Political career ==
Zuberi was elected to the Provincial Assembly of Sindh on a reserved seat for women in the 1977 general election where she remained from 30 March 1977 to 5 June 1977.

Zuberi was elected to the Senate of Pakistan as a candidate of Pakistan Peoples Party (PPP) on reserved seat for women from Sindh in 2003 Senate election. She retired as senator after the completion of her six-year term in 2009.

Zuberi was re-elected to the Senate as a candidate of PPP on technocrat seat from Sindh in the 2018 Pakistani Senate election. She took oath as Senator on 12 March 2018.
