= Public Accounts Committee (Pakistan) =

Agency overview
- Formed: May 20, 1948; 78 years ago
- Jurisdiction: National Assembly of Pakistan
- Headquarters: Islamabad, Pakistan
- Agency executives: Chairman; Junaid Akbar
- Website: www.pac.na.gov.pk

The Public Accounts Committee (PAC) holds a significant role within global accountability frameworks, working to ensure the responsible use of public funds. Operating as a legislative body within the National Assembly of Pakistan, its primary objective is to uphold transparency and accountability across all public bodies and constitutional institutions. Through its functions, the PAC aims to present a clear and accountable representation of these entities, promoting financial integrity and good governance.

== History ==
The inaugural Public Accounts Committee (PAC) in Pakistan was established on 20 May 1948. Since its formation, there have been a total of 14 regular PACs and 6 Ad hoc PACs. Ad hoc PACs are constituted in Pakistan during periods when there is no elected Legislature in the country, ensuring oversight and accountability even in transitional or exceptional circumstances.

== Role ==
The Public Accounts Committee (PAC) plays a crucial role in upholding transparency and accountability within Ministries, Divisions, and Public Sector Organizations in Pakistan. Its responsibilities include a thorough examination of the Auditor General of Pakistan's Report. This involves summoning representatives from the relevant Ministries and Departments to probe and inquire about any financial irregularities.

The PAC meticulously reviews public audits, inviting ministers, permanent secretaries, or other officials from the ministries for questioning. After conducting a government budget audit, the PAC compiles a report detailing their findings. Subsequently, the government is obligated to report back to parliament on the recommendations provided by the PAC within a specified period, ensuring appropriate action is taken based on the committee's findings.

== Chairmen ==
- Rao Muhammad Hashim Khan
- Hakim Ali Zardari (1990)
- Khurshid Shah
- Noor Alam Khan
- Rana Tanveer Hussain
- Junaid Akbar

== Controversies ==
The Public Accounts Committee (PAC) has faced several controversies over the years:

- Acting Chairman of the National Accountability Bureau (NAB), Zahir Shah, has contested the authority of the Public Accounts Committee (PAC) in the Islamabad High Court, raising questions regarding its powers.
- Chairman of the Public Accounts Committee (PAC), Rana Tanveer Hussain, expressed frustration over various ministries, including the Ministry of Commerce, for their failure to conduct routine departmental accounts committee meetings. This lack of action was seen as a serious case of financial misconduct by the ministries and those entrusted with managing their financial affairs, effectively impeding the necessary checks and balances for accountability.
- The Public Accounts Committee (PAC) has faced challenges in its performance attributed to various factors. These include the repetitive nature of audit observations, a lack of ownership of audit reports by the executive, and indifference to PAC directives. Additionally, the absence of an effective role played by Chief Finance and Accounts Officers has also contributed to the impact on the committee's performance.
