= Abdul Rahim Khan Mandokhel =

Pakistani politician

Abdul Rahim Khan Mandokhail
- عبدالرحیم خان مندوخیل

Member of the National Assembly of Pakistan
- In office 1 June 2013 – 20 May 2017
- Constituency: NA-260 (Quetta-cum-Chagai-cum-Mastung)

Member of the Senate of Pakistan
- In office 1991-1997
- In office 2006–2012

Member of the Provincial Assembly of Balochistan

Assembly Member for PB-1 (Quetta-I)
- In office 1997-1999

Personal details
- Born: 12 January 1937 Fort Sandeman, Baluchistan Agency, British India (present-day Zhob, Balochistan, Pakistan)
- Died: 20 May 2017 (aged 80) Quetta, Balochistan, Pakistan
- Party: Pashtunkhwa Milli Awami Party
- Education: University of Peshawar (LL.B.)

Baba-e-Afghan Abdul Rahim Khan Mandokhail (Pashto: عبدالرحيم خان مندوخېل) (12 January 1937 – 20 May 2017) was a Pashtun Afghan nationalist and politician who had been a member of the National Assembly of Pakistan, the Provincial Assembly of Balochistan, and the Senate of Pakistan.

== Early life and education ==
Baba-e-Afghan Abdul Rahim Khan Mandokhail was born on 12 January 1937 in the village of Omzha Murssainzai (attached to Shin Ghar) of Fort Sandeman, British India (present-day Zhob, Pakistan). According to some reports, he was born on 15 June 1932.

He obtained degrees in Bachelor of Arts and Bachelor of Law.

== Political career ==
He served as a member of the Senate of Pakistan from 1991 to 1997.

He was elected to the Provincial Assembly of Balochistan in the 1997 Pakistani general election.

He was re-elected to the Senate of Pakistan on general seat as Pashtunkhwa Milli Awami Party candidate in 2006, where he served until 2012.

He was elected as the member of the National Assembly on a ticket of Pashtunkhwa Milli Awami Party from NA-260 (Quetta) in the 2013 Pakistani general election.

He served as senior deputy chairman of Pashtunkhwa Milli Awami Party from 1989 until his death on 20 May 2017 in Quetta.
