= Ahmad Ali (Sindh politician) =

Pakistani politician

Senator of Pakistan
- In office March 2006 – March 2012
- Constituency: Sindh

Personal details
- Party: Mutahidda Qaumi Movement (MQM)

Ahmad Ali is a Pakistani politician who served as a Senator from March 2006 to March 2012. He is a member of the Mutahidda Qaumi Movement (MQM) and represented the province of Sindh in the Senate of Pakistan.
