= G. Allana =

Pakistani Poet and Biographer

Ghulam Ali Allana
- Born: 22 August 1906; Karachi, British India
- Died: 8 March 1985 (aged 78); Karachi, Pakistan
- Occupations: Poet; Historian; Biographer; Diplomat
- Movement: Pakistan Movement

Ghulam Ali Allana (22 August 1906 – 8 March 1985), better known as G. Allana, was a friend and biographer of Muhammad Ali Jinnah, the founder of Pakistan. Allana entered politics at an early age and played an active part in the Pakistan Movement. After the partition of India and creation of Pakistan, he was instrumental in forming the Federation of Pakistan Chambers of Commerce & Industry. He was a member of the West Pakistan Legislative Assembly, and also served as the mayor of Karachi. Internationally, Allana represented Pakistan at over 100 conferences, served on the governing body of the International Labour Organisation, and the president of the International Organisation of Employers, Brussels. At the United Nations, he led a number of peace and diplomatic initiatives/working groups and went on to become chairman of the United Nations Commission on Human Rights in 1975. For his contributions he was awarded the United Nations peace medal and was also a nominee for the Nobel Peace Prize in 1977. He was also an English-language Pakistani poet and a counselor and friend to Fatima Jinnah, Muhammad Ali Jinnah's sister.

== Early life and career ==
Ghulam Ali Allana was born in 1906 to a Ismaili Khoja family in Karachi, British India. He received his basic education at Sindh Madressatul Islam in Karachi. Then he attended St. Patrick's High School and D. J. Sindh Government Science College in Karachi.

G. Allana became active in politics at an early age and played an active role in the Pakistan Movement. After independence of Pakistan in 1947, he served as the second Mayor of Karachi after the partition (25 May 1948 – 8 July 1948). He served as founder President of the FPCCI until 1954.

== Family ==
G. Allana was the eldest son of Allana Khalfan and the grandson of Nathu who was one of the 72 Ismailis killed in the battle of Jhirk when Mir Sher Mohammed attacked the settlement where Aga Khan the 1st was residing. Khalfan, the son of Nathu, later migrated to Karachi around 1850 and established his home in what is today known as the Kharadar area of Karachi. He married Jenubai in 1928 and had two daughters and a son with her.

== Books ==
- Quaid-e-Azam Jinnah: The story of a Nation, published in 1967 by Ferozsons, Lahore
- Pakistan Movement: Historical Documents, published in 1977 by Islamic Book Service, Lahore
- Our Freedom Fighters
- His Highness Aga Khan III
- I had Reached your Door Steps, a poem in English
- The Lost Star, a poem in English

== Awards and recognition ==
- Peace Medal of the United Nations in 1977 by UN Secretary General Kurt Waldheim, awarded to him for his services on a global basis in the humanitarian field.
- Human Rights Medal awarded in 1978 by the Human Rights Organization of Pakistan.

To recognize his services to Pakistan, a road in Karachi was named, G. Allana Road, after him.
