= Abdul Razak Thaheem =

Pakistani politician (1927–2010)

Justice (R) Abdul Razzaq A.Thaheem
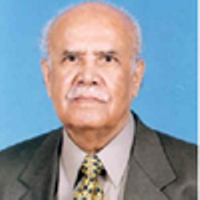

Senator of Pakistan
- In office March 2006 – March 2012

Judge of the Federal Shariat Court
- In office October 29, 1989 – October 28, 1991

Personal details
- Born: 18 October 1927
- Died: September 1, 2010 (aged 82)
- Party: Pakistan People's Party Parliamentarian (PPPP)

Justice (R) Abdul Razzaq A.Thaheem (18 October 1927 – 1 September 2010) was a Pakistani judge and politician who served as an advocate. He has also served as a Senator from March 2006 to March 2012. He was a member of the Pakistan Peoples Party Parliamentarians (PPPP).

== Early life and education ==
Thaheem was born on 18 October 1927 in Sheran Pur, Garhi Khairo, Jacobabad District of Sindh. He studied LL.B from University of Karachi. After study he joined as an advocate of the Sindh High Court. Later he joined the Supreme Court of Pakistan as an advocate.

== Death ==
He died on 1 September 2010.
