= Gul Naseeb Khan =

Pakistani politician

Senator Maulana Gul Naseeb Khan

Member of the Senate of Pakistan
- In office March 2006 – March 2012
- Constituency: Khyber Pakhtunkhwa

Central Senior Vice President JUI(F)
- In office 2006–2012
- President: Fazal-ur-Rehman

Chief Election Commissioner JUI(F)
- In office 2002–2006
- President: Fazal-ur-Rehman

KPK Provincial President of MMA Party
- Incumbent
- Assumed office 2012
- President: Fazal-ur-Rehman

Personal details
- Born: Adenzai, Khyber Pakhtunkhwa, Pakistan
- Party: Rabita Jamiat Ulema-e-Islam (since 2020)
- Other political affiliations: Jamiat Ulema-e-Islam (F) (until 2020)

Maulana Gul Naseeb Khan is a Pakistani politician who served as a Member of the Senate of Pakistan from March 2006 to March 2012. He belongs to Village Laram of Adenzai Tehsil in Lower Dir District of Khyber Pakhtunkhwa, Pakistan.

== Education ==
He holds a master's degree in Islamiat.

== Political career ==
Khan joined Jamiat Ulema-e-Islam (F) and soon he became a leader for Adenzai Tehsil. He was elected as Senator in 2006. He served the Senate of Pakistan until 2012. He held different positions within his party as well. He served as Chief Election Commissioner JUI in 2002. He was Chief Executive for Dew-a-Band International Conference in 2002. He also was C.E. of Tahafuz-e-Deeni Madaris.

He ran for the National Assembly of Pakistan from NA-8 Malakand as a candidate of the Muttahida Majlis-e-Amal (MMA) in the 2018 Pakistani general election, but was unsuccessful. He received 32,059 votes and was defeated by Junaid Akbar, a candidate of the Pakistan Tehreek-e-Insaf (PTI).

== Separation from Jamiat Ulema-e-Islam (F) ==
Khan had many issues with party head Fazal-ur-Rehman. After strong criticism on party policies, Muhammad Khan Sherani and Gul Naseeb were expelled from the party in late 2020.

Khan joined Imran Khan against the controversial government of Pakistan Democratic Movement in 2022.
