= Naeem Hussain Chattha =

Pakistani politician

Senator of Pakistan
- In office March 2006 – March 2012
- Constituency: Punjab

Member of the Provincial Assembly of Punjab
- In office 2002–2007

Personal details
- Party: Pakistan Muslim League (PML)
- Profession: Politician

Naeem Hussain Chattha was a Pakistani politician who served as a senator from March 2006 to March 2012. He represented the province of Punjab and was a member of the Pakistan Muslim League (PML). He also served as a Member of the Provincial Assembly of Punjab from 2002 to 2007.

Chattha's son, Abid Hussain Chattha, is also a politician.
