= Gulshan Saeed =

Pakistani politician

Senator of Pakistan
- In office March 2003 – March 2012
- Constituency: Punjab

Personal details
- Party: Pakistan Muslim League-N (PML)
- Education: University of the Punjab
- Profession: Politician

Gulshan Saeed is a Pakistani politician who served as a senator from March 2003 to March 2012. She represented the province of Punjab and was a member of the Pakistan Muslim League (PML-Q).
