= NA-260 (Quetta-cum-Chagai-cum-Mastung) =

Former constituency of the National Assembly of Pakistan

- Former constituency for the National Assembly of Pakistan
- Region: Quetta District; Chagai District; Mastung District

Former constituency
- Abolished: 2018
- Replaced by: NA-267 (Mastung-cum-Shaheed Sikandarabad-cum-Kalat); NA-268 (Chagai-cum-Nushki-cum-Kharan)

NA-260 (Quetta-cum-Chagai-cum-Mastung) (Urdu: این اے-۲۶۰، کوئٹہ-چاغى-مستونگ) was a constituency for the National Assembly of Pakistan. The constituency was replaced by NA-267 (Mastung-cum-Shaheed Sikandarabad-cum-Kalat) and NA-268 (Chagai-cum-Nushki-cum-Kharan). The areas from Mastung District became part of NA-267 (Mastung-cum-Shaheed Sikandarabad-cum-Kalat) and the areas from Chagai District became part of NA-268 (Chagai-cum-Nushki-cum-Kharan).

== Election 2002 ==
General elections were held on 10 October 2002. Hafiz Hussain Ahmed of Muttahida Majlis-e-Amal won by 39,013 votes.

General election 2002: NA-260 (Quetta-cum-Chagai-cum-Nushki-cum-Mastung)
Party	Candidate	Votes	%	±%
MMA	Hussain Anmed	39,013	38.85	
PML(Q)	Baloch Khan Mengal	26,690	26.58	
PPP	Sardar Fateh Muhammad Muhammad Hassani	16,114	16.05	
BNP (M)	Habib Jalib Baloch	11,368	11.32	
BNM	Ghulam Farooq Baloch	2,483	2.47	
Others	Others (six candidates)	4,753	4.73	
Turnout		105,494	28.57	
Total valid votes		100,421	95.19	
Rejected ballots		5,073	4.81	
Majority		12,323	12.27	
Registered electors		369,216		

== Election 2008 ==
General elections were held on 18 February 2008. Sardar Al-Haaj Muhammad Umar Goragaje of PPP won by 40,773 votes.

General election 2008: NA-260 (Quetta-cum-Chagai-cum-Nushki-cum-Mastung)
Party	Candidate	Votes	%	±%
PPP	Sardar Al-Haaj Muhammad Umar Goragaje	40,773	40.53	
PML(Q)	Sardar Fateh Muhammad Muhammad Hassani	29,443	29.27	
MMA	Malik Sikandar Khan	19,450	19.34	
HDP	Barkat Ali Thamki	3,174	3.16	
Independent	Syed Zahir Shah Zadi	2,376	2.36	
Others	Others (eight candidates)	5,381	5.34	
Turnout		104,772	26.27	
Total valid votes		100,597	96.02	
Rejected ballots		4,175	3.98	
Majority		11,330	11.26	
Registered electors		398,782		

== Election 2013 ==
General elections were held on 11 May 2013. Abdul Rahim Mandokhail of Pakhtun-khwa Milli Awami Party won by 30,338 votes and became the member of National Assembly. After his demise in 2017 Mir Usman Badini was elected as the member of National Assembly.

General election 2013: NA-260 (Quetta-cum-Chagai-cum-Nushki-cum-Mastung)
Party	Candidate	Votes	%	±%
PMAP	Abdul Rahim Mandokhail	30,338	17.91	
JUI (F)	Manzoor Ahmed Mengal	26,019	15.36	
BNP (M)	Agha Hassan Baloch	25,104	14.82	
PPP	Sardar Al-Haaj Muhammad Umar Goragaje	15,857	9.36	
NP	Muhammad Yousaf	14,441	8.53	
JUINP	Fazal Muhammad Barech	11,003	6.50	
PML(N)	Irfan Aziz Kurd	8,692	5.13	
PTI	Karim Dad	7,653	4.52	
MDM	Muhammad Hayat Muhammad Hassani	7,183	4.24	
HDP	Muhammad Raza	5,271	3.11	
Independent	Sardar Aurang Zaib Rukhshani	2,745	1.62	
Independent	Atta Ur Rehman	2,524	1.49	
Others	Others (twenty eight candidates)	12,563	7.41	
Turnout		176,425	41.05	
Total valid votes		169,393	96.01	
Rejected ballots		7,032	3.99	
Majority		4,319	2.55	
Registered electors		429,794		

== By-Election 2017 ==
By-Election 2017: NA-260 (Quetta-cum-Chagai-cum-Nushki-cum-Mastung)
Party	Candidate	Votes	%	±%
JUI (F)	Eng. Muhammad Usman Badaini	44,898	34.55	
BNP (M)	Mir Bahadur Khan	37,551	28.90	
Independent	Jamal Khan Tarkai	20,484	15.76	
PPP	Umair Muhammad Hassani	19,906	15.32	
PTI	Munir Ahmed Baloch	2,835	2.18	
JUINP	Molana Qari Mehrullah	1,873	1.44	
Others	Others (eleven candidates)	2,851	1.85	
Turnout		133,730	29.06	
Total valid votes		129,948	97.17	
Rejected ballots		3,782	2.83	
Majority		7,347	5.65	
Registered electors		460,202		
