= Federation of Pakistan Chambers of Commerce & Industry =

Organization in Pakistan

The Federation of Pakistan Chambers of Commerce & Industry
- فیڈریشن اتاق های تجارت و صنایع پاکستان
- Abbreviation: FPCCI
- Formation: 1950; 76 years ago
- Founder: G. Allana, (1950-54); Co founder = Khalid Mahmood, 1988-Present
- Headquarters: Karachi, Pakistan
- Region served: Pakistan
- President: Atif Ikram Sheikh
- Website: fpcci.org.pk

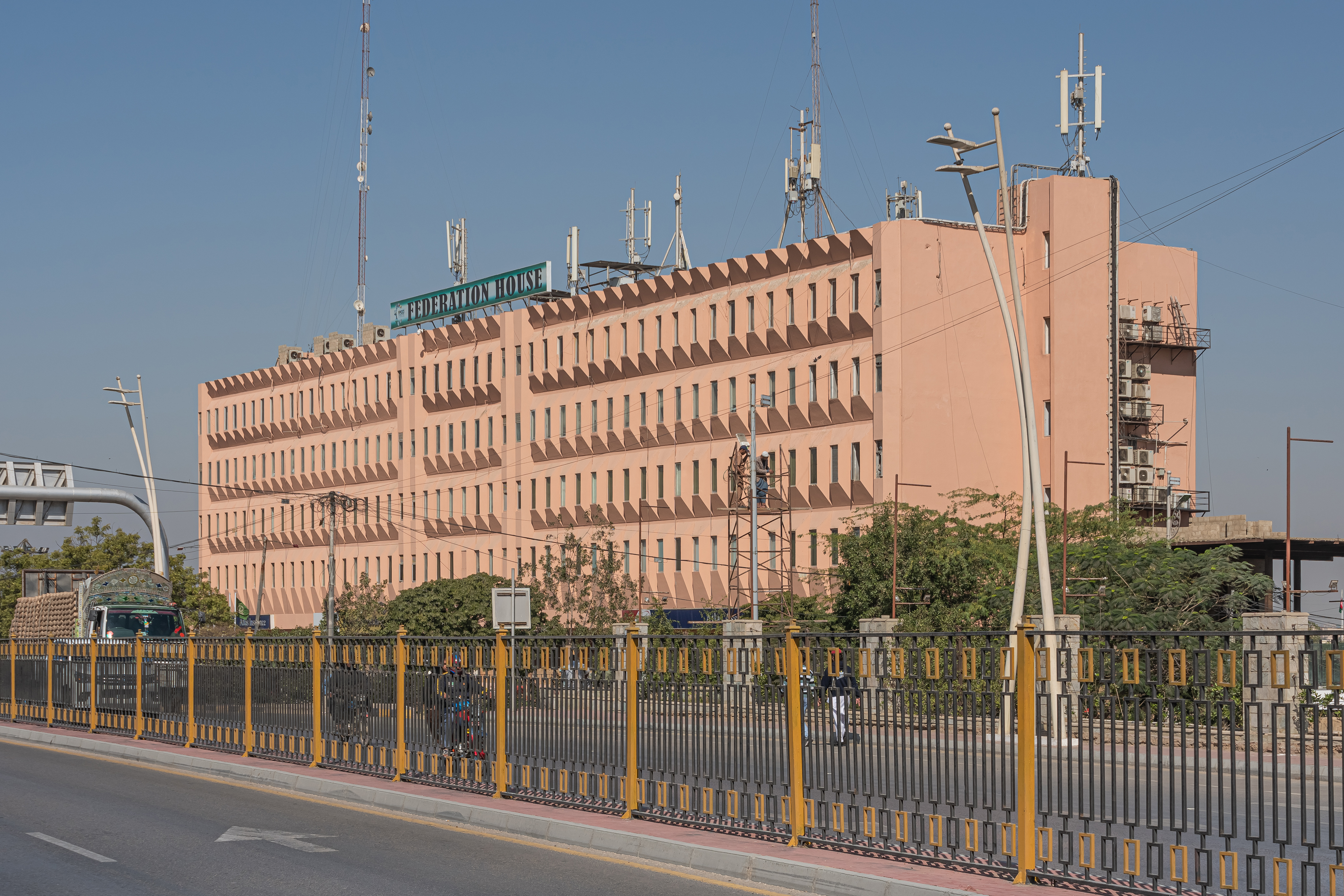
The FPCCI Head Office in Clifton, Karachi

Since its inception in 1950, Federation of Pakistan Chambers of Commerce & Industry (FPCCI) has advocated and voiced the collective opinion, concern and aspiration of the private sector and offered helpful advice and solid assistance to the Government in its efforts to promote exports, encourage foreign investment and stimulate economic activity in Pakistan.

The FPCCI has its fingers on the pulse of the economy and serves as a bridge between the private sector and the Government.

The FPCCI is playing an active role in presenting problems of trade, industry and environment and safeguarding the interests of the private sector through constant dialogue with the Government.

The Apex Body of Trade and Industry and Chief Spokesman of the Private Sector in Pakistan.

== Membership ==
FPCCI has under its umbrella; 289 Trade Bodies 76 Chambers of Commerce and Industry, 30 Women's Chambers of Commerce & Industry such as Women Chamber of Commerce Quetta, 16 Chambers of Small Traders, 162 All Pakistan Trade Associations, representing industry, trade, and service sectors, and 5 Joint Chambers of Commerce are its part.

== FPCCI offices ==
Federation Offices and its standing committees have the presence in all four provincial headquarters, namely in Lahore, Peshawar, Quetta, Gawadar, and Gilgit Baltistan, including its capital house at Islamabad, to serve the interests of the business community at the micro level.

== International affiliations ==
- International Chamber of Commerce
- Confederation of Asia Pacific Chambers of Commerce & Industry (CACCI)
- Islamic Chamber of Commerce, Industry & Agriculture (ICCIA)
- ECO Chamber of Commerce & Industry (ECO CCI)
- SAARC Chamber of Commerce & Industry (SAARC CCI)
- D-8 Federation of Chambers of Commerce & Industry

== Office bearers ==
President		Atif Ikram Sheikh			Sr. Vice President				Saquib Fayyaz Magoon		
Vice President	Vice President	Vice President	Vice President	Vice President	Vice President	Vice President	Vice President	Vice President	Vice President	Vice President	Secretary General
Zaki Aijaz	Abdul Mohamin Khan	Nasir Khan	Muhammad Aman	Asif Sakhi	Asif Inam	Zain Iftikhar Ch.	Aun Ali Syed	Qurrat ul Ain	Ashfaq Ahmed	Tariq Khan Jadoon	Brig. Iftikhar Opel (Retd)

== Important Central Standing Committees ==
1. AGRICULTURE
2. AFGHAN TRANSIT TRADE
3. ANTI-CORRUPTION
4. AUTO INDUSTRY
5. INTELLECTUAL PROPERTY ORGANIZATION
6. FBR & CUSTOMS GRIEVANCES REDRESSAL
7. DIPLOMATIC AFFAIRS
8. ENERGY
9. EXPORT
10. INFORMATION TECHNOLOGY
11. China-Pakistan Economic Corridor

== See also ==
- Pakistan Ministry of Commerce
- Planning Commission (Pakistan)
- International Chamber of Commerce
- China Chamber of International Commerce
- Union of Chambers and Commodity Exchanges of Turkey
- United States Chamber of Commerce
- Federation of Indian Chambers of Commerce & Industry
