= Tariq Azim Khan =

Pakistani politician and diplomat

Tariq Azim Khan was Pakistan's Deputy Information Minister under Prime Minister Shaukat Aziz during Pervez Musharraf regime. His duties included speaking with foreign media and he headed 'The Pakistan Image Project' before leaving his cabinet post.

== Career ==
Tariq Azim Khan also served in the Senate of Pakistan from 2003 to 2012.

In 2012, he joined the Pakistan Muslim League (N). In October 2015, he was appointed as Pakistan's High Commissioner to Canada.
