= Khyber train safari =

Defunct Pakistani tourist train

Khyber Train Safari خیبر بخار سفاری
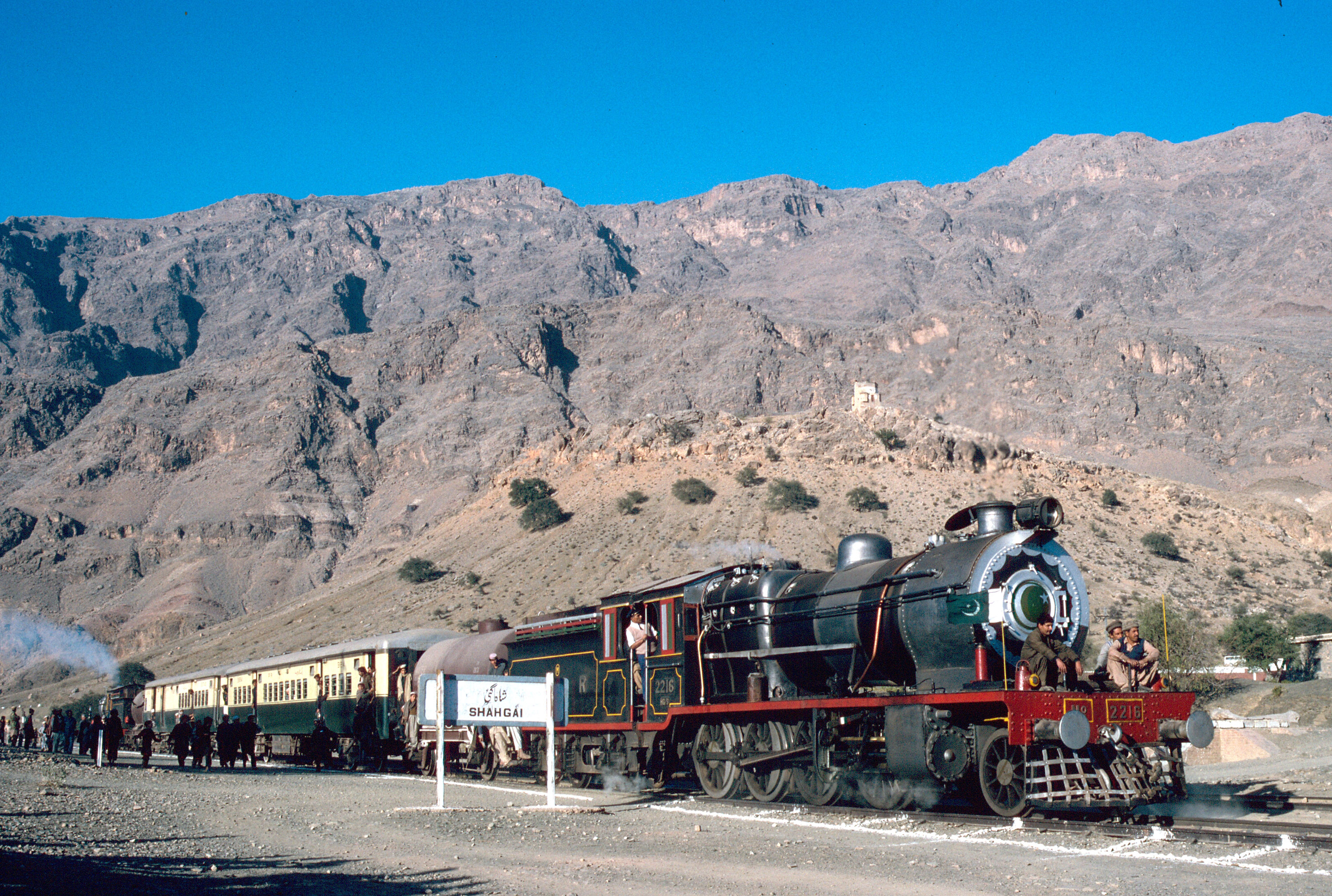

Overview
- Service type: Tourist train
- First service: April 11, 2015
- Current operator: Tourism Corporation of Khyber Pakhtunkhwa

Route
- Termini: Peshawar Cantonment; Attock Khurd
- Distance travelled: 69 kilometres (43 mi)
- Average journey time: 1 hours, 26 minutes
- Service frequency: Daily
- Train numbers: 1UP (Peshawar→Landi Kotal); 2DN (Landi Kotal→Peshawar)

Technical
- Track gauge: 1,676 mm (5 ft 6 in)
- Track owner: Pakistan Railways

Khyber Steam Safari
Overview
- Service type: Tourist train
- First service: 1996
- Last service: 2006
- Former operators: Sehrai Travels’ & Sarhard Tourism Corporation (1996 to 2006); Pakistan Tourism Development Corporation (2006)

Route
- Termini: Peshawar Cantonment; Landi Khana
- Distance travelled: 58 kilometres (36 mi)
- Average journey time: 1 hours, 52 minutes
- Service frequency: Daily
- Train numbers: 1UP (Peshawar→Landi Kotal); 2DN (Landi Kotal→Peshawar)

Technical
- Track gauge: 1,676 mm (5 ft 6 in)
- Track owner: Pakistan Railways

The Khyber train safari (Urdu: خیبر بخار سفاری, Pashto: د خیبر تپ صفري) is a defunct tourist train that was operated between Peshawar and Landi Kotal by Tourism Corporation of Khyber Pakhtunkhwa and Pakistan Railways. The trip took approximately 1 hour and 26 minutes to cover a published distance of 69 kilometres (43 mi), traveling along an entire stretch of the Karachi–Peshawar Railway Line. It was the only passenger line in Pakistan still operating steam engines.

== History ==
=== Passenger service (1925–1982) ===
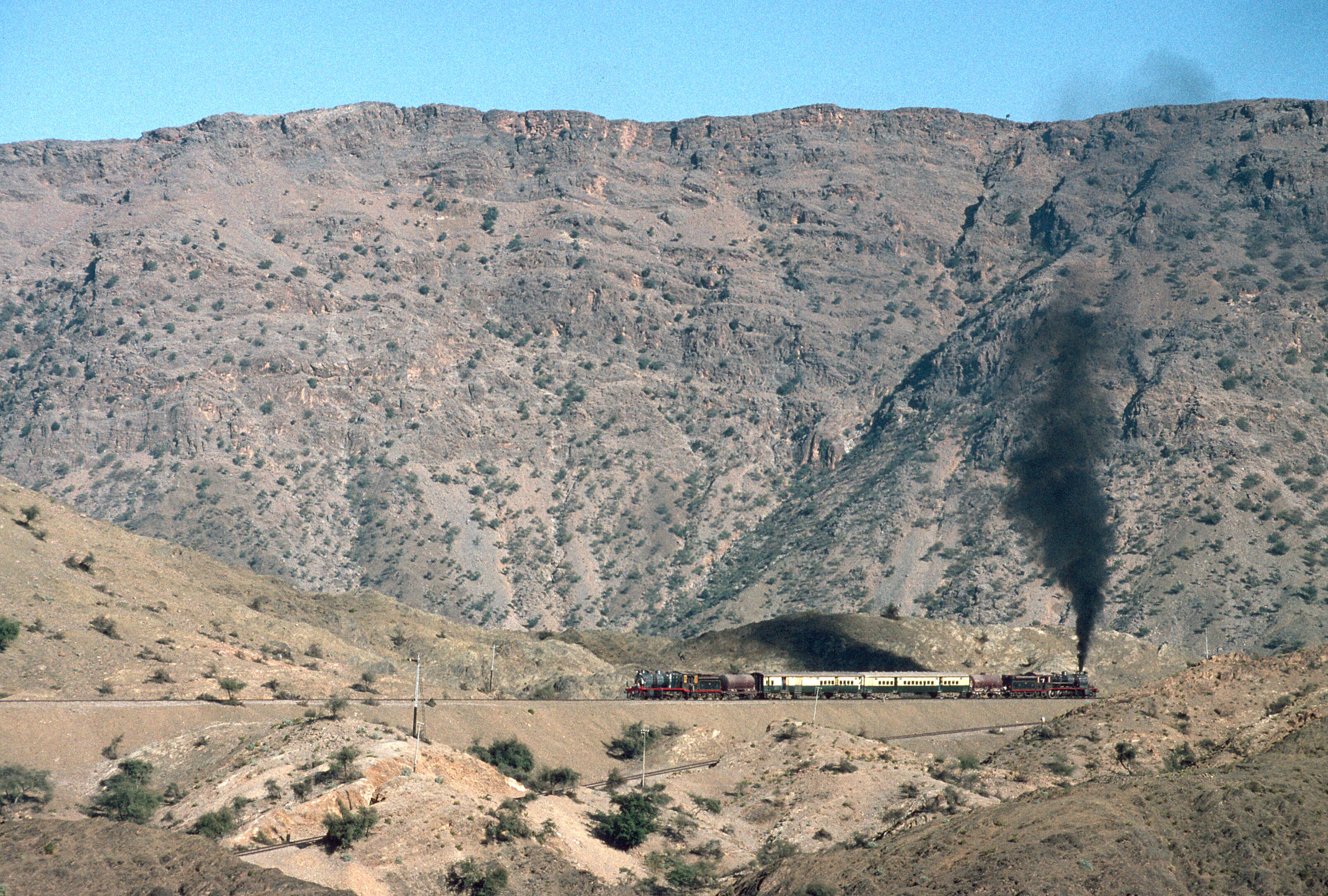
The Khyber Railway. With a Pakistan Railways HGS 2-8-0 at front and rear a charter train climbs the Khyber Pass through a series of zig-zags to gain height.

Regular passenger service along the Khyber Pass Railway began on 4 November 1925 between Peshawar City railway station and Landi Kotal railway station. The train took passengers through rugged mountainous terrain reaching a height of 1,200 m (3,900 ft) to reach Landi Kotal and covering a total distance of 52 km (32 mi) through 34 tunnels and 92 bridges and culverts. The oil-fired steam engines, which pushed and pulled the carriages from the rear and front, were built by Vulcan Foundry and by Kitson & Co in the United Kingdom. One of the unusual features of this train journey was that its route passed across Peshawar Airport's main runway. On 3 April 1926, the railway was extended to Landi Khana, just 3 kilometers from the Torkham border crossing with Afghanistan. In 1932, the Landi Kotal to Landi Khana section of railway was closed down at the insistence of Afghan government. Regularly scheduled rail service continued between Peshawar and Landi Kotal until 1982, when it stopped due to lack of commercial value. The 2006 monsoon season rains in the Khyber Pass washed away significant sections of the railway. The track as of today is closed for all rail traffic.

=== Khyber steam safari (1996–2006) ===
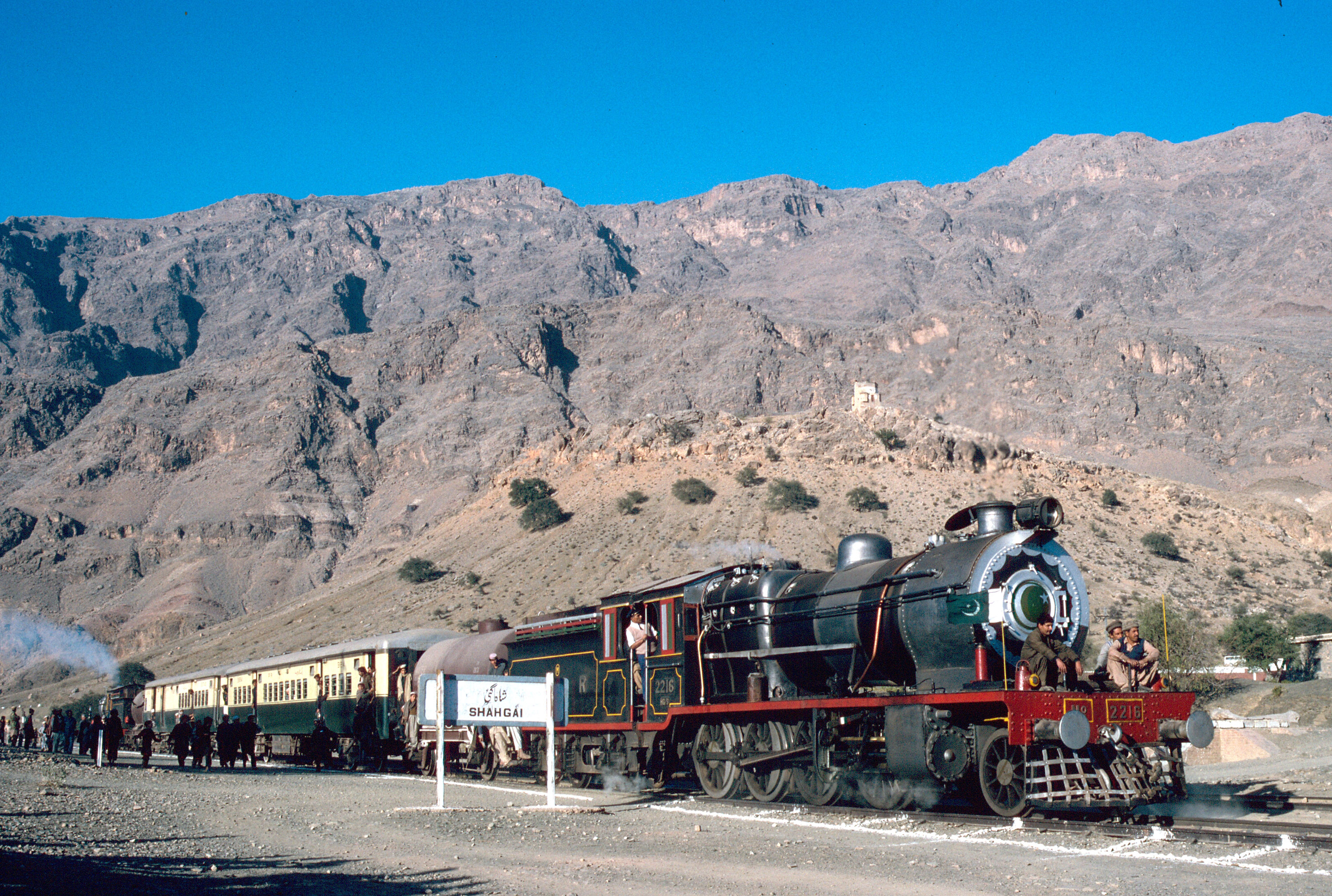
A charter train about to depart from Shahgai and descend out of the Khyber Pass back to Jamrud, near Peshawar. The local tribesmen are asserting their right to free travel on the trains, a condition of the railway being built through their land.

In 1996, Sehrai Travels’ in collaboration with Sarhad Tourism Corporation launched the Khyber Steam Safari for foreign and local tourists and was described by Time Magazine as "a journey into time and history". The train consisted of a refurbished parlour car and two second class coaches pulled by two vintage steam locomotives, as those used originally on the Khyber Pass Railway. The train was run on the first Sunday of every month as a charter, however the local population around the Khyber Pass were allowed free access. Pakistan Tourism Development Corporation took over operations in 2006 and in the same year the service was suspended due to damage of the line caused by monsoon rain.

=== Khyber train safari (2015–present) ===
In 2015, the Tourism Corporation Khyber Pakhtunkhwa took control of the former Khyber Steam Safari and renamed it to Khyber Train Safari (also known as Abaseen Steam Safari). However, the route now takes the train between Peshawar and Attock Khurd.

In 2021, the Government of Khyber Pakhtunkhwa announced the relaunch of the project on two routes: Peshawar to Attock, and Peshawar to Takht-i-Bahi. The Peshawar to Landi Kotal route was to remain defunct. An inspection of the damaged tracks in the Khyber District was carried out by officials and technical staff of Pakistan Railways in November 2021.

== Route ==
- Peshawar Cantonment–Attock Khurd via Karachi–Peshawar Railway Line (presently operating Khyber Train Safari)
- Peshawar City–Landi Kotal via Khyber Pass Railway (now defunct Khyber Steam Safari)

== Station stops ==
Khyber Train Safari

- Peshawar Cantonment
- Peshawar City
- Nasarpur
- Taru Jabba
- Pabbi
- Pir Piai
- Khushhal
- Nowshera Junction
- Hayat Sher Pao Shahid
- Akora Khattak
- Jhangira Road
- Khairabad Kund
- Attock Khurd

Khyber Steam Safari

- Peshawar City
- Peshawar Cantonment
- Jamrud
- Bagiarari
- Medanak (1st Reversing Station)
- Chaghi (2nd Reversing Station)
- Shahgai
- Kata Kushta
- Zintara
- Sultan Khel
- Landi Kotal
- Torra Tigga (3rd Reversing Station)
- Landi Khana (4th Reversing Station)

== Equipment ==
Peshawar locomotive shed continues to maintain 3 steam engines, which were used on the original passenger service on the Khyber Pass Railway, the Khyber steam safari and now on the Khyber train safari.

- 2-8-0 HG/S #2216 built by Kitson and Company in 1916
- 2-8-0 HG/S #2277 built by Vulcan Foundry in 1923
- 2-8-0 HG/S #2306 built by Vulcan foundry in 1923

== See also ==
- Pakistan Railways
- Peshawar Circular Railway
- Karachi–Peshawar Railway Line
