= Landi Kotal railway station =

Railway station in Pakistan

Landi Kotal Railway Station د لنډي کوتل د اورګاډي اډه
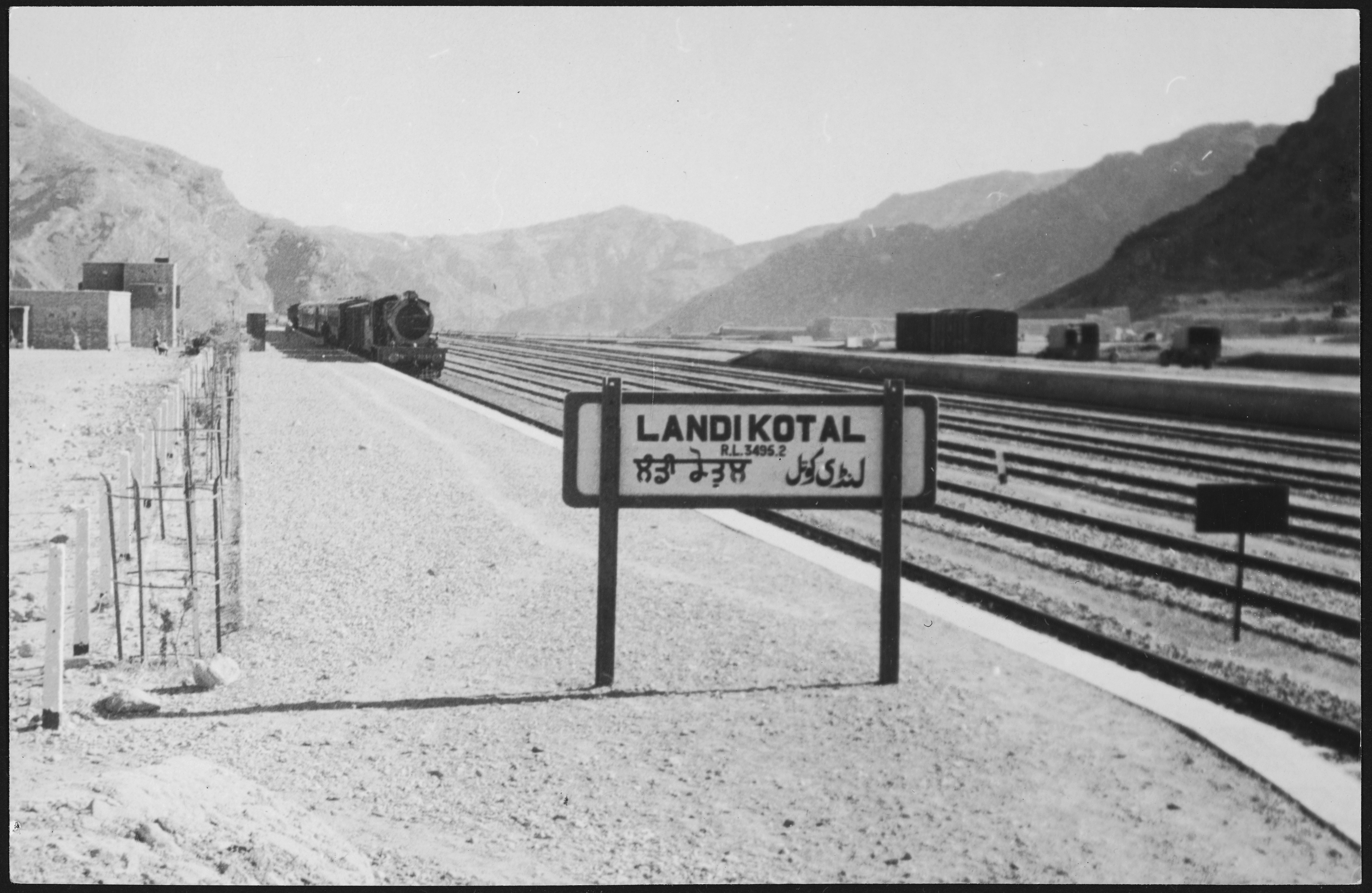
- Landi Kotal station in 1939 or 1940, photo by Annemarie Schwarzenbach

General information
- Location: Torkham Road; Pakistan
- Coordinates: 34.093461°N 71.146862°E
- Owner: Ministry of Railways
- Line: Khyber Pass Railway
- Tracks: 4

Other information
- Status: Closed
- Station code: LDKN

History
- Opened: 3 November 1925
- Closed: 2006

Services
| Preceding station | Pakistan Railways | Following station |
|---|---|---|
| Sultan Khel towards Peshawar City | Khyber Pass Railway (defunct) | Torra Tigga towards Landi Khana |
Location
- Location within Khyber Pakhtunkhwa

Landi Kotal Railway Station (Pashto: د لنډي کوتل د اورګاډي اډه; Urdu: لنڈی کوتل ریلوے اسٹیشن) is a railway station in Landi Kotal, a town in the Khyber Pakhtunkhwa province of Pakistan. It lies near the border with the Nangarhar Province of Afghanistan. The railway station was built in 1925 during British rule. It was the terminus railway station of Khyber Pass Railway.

== History ==
The Landi-Kotal railway station was opened in November 1925 alongside the Khyber Pass Railway's newly laid tracks between Jamrud and Landi Kotal. In 1982, regular service to the Landi Kotal railway station was terminated. However, beginning in the 1990s, the station served as the terminus of the Khyber train safari, a tourist train running from Peshawar to Landi Kotal via the Khyber Pass. The route was closed in 2006 after damage to the track due to extensive flooding.

== See also ==
- List of railway stations in Pakistan
- Pakistan Railways
