= Jamrud railway station =

Railway station in Pakistan

Jamrud Railway Station جمرود جنکشن ریلوے اسٹیشن
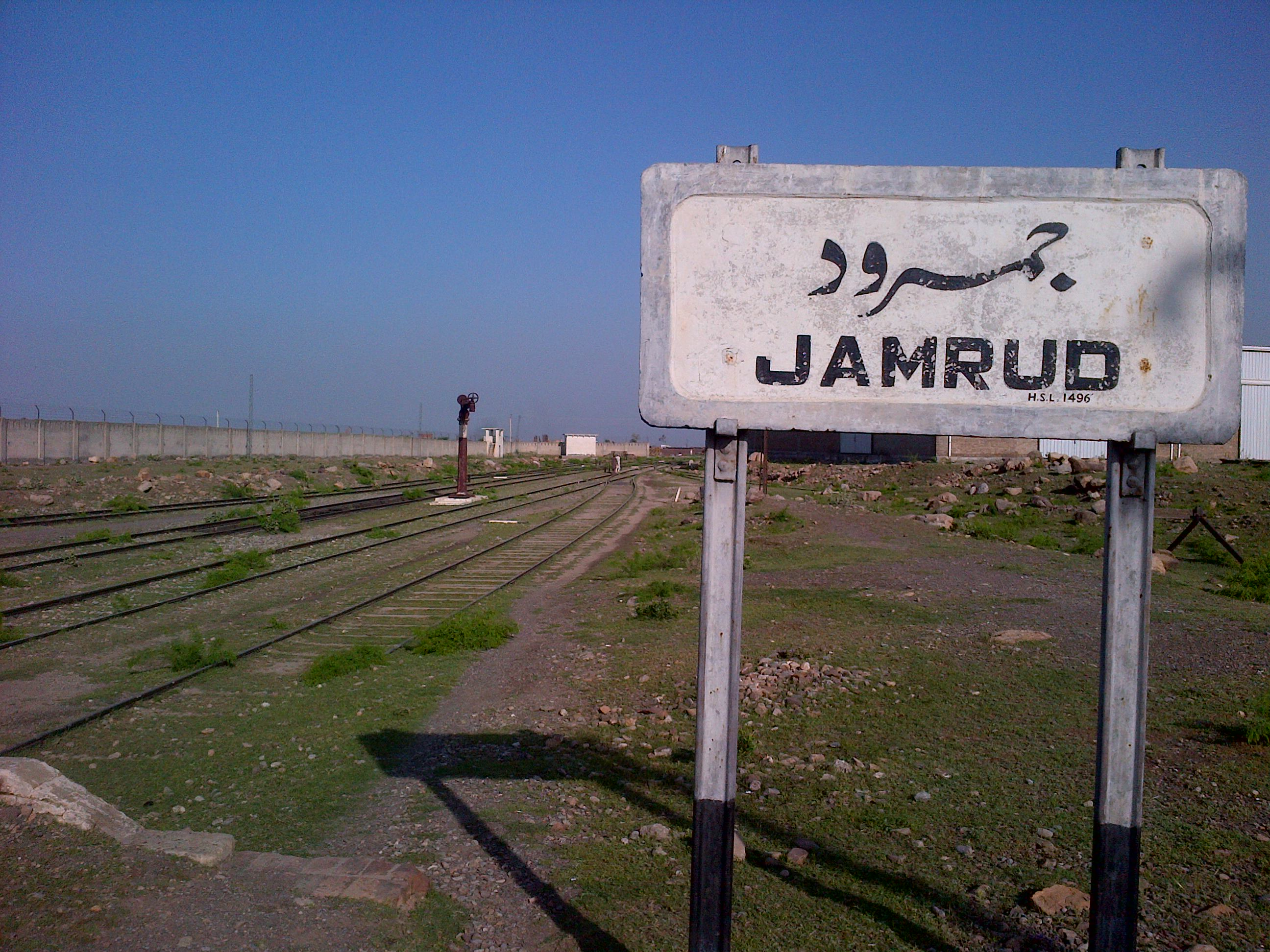

General information
- Location: Pakistan
- Owner: Ministry of Railways
- Line: Khyber Pass Railway
- Distance: 18 km from Peshawar Cantonment Railway Station

Other information
- Station code: JRD

History
- Opened: 1922
- Closed: 2006

Services
Preceding station	Pakistan Railways	Following station
Peshawar Cantonment towards Peshawar City	Khyber Pass Railway (defunct)	Bagiarari towards Landi Khana
Location

Jamrud Railway Station (Urdu: جمرود جنکشن ریلوے اسٹیشن, Pashto: د جمرود جنکشن اورګاډي سټيشن) is a railway station in Jamrud town, in Khyber Agency, Khyber Pakhtunkhwa, Pakistan.

== History ==
Tracks connecting the Jamrud Railway Station to Landi Kotal via the Khyber Pass were completed in November 1925. The tracks have since fallen into disuse.

Passenger train service between Peshawar and Landi Kotal began in 1925 and continued until 1982. The service was subsequently discontinued due to a lack of passengers.

In 1992, the government launched a 'Safari Train' service, which was used by both tourists and locals. This train would travel to Landi Kotal and return during the day. The service was suspended following damage to the track caused by the 2006 floods and could not be restored thereafter.

== See also ==
- List of railway stations in Pakistan
- Pakistan Railways
