= Shahgai railway station =

Railway station in Khyber Pakhtunkhwa, Pakistan

Shahgai Railway Station شاہ گئی ریل گاڑی سٹیشن
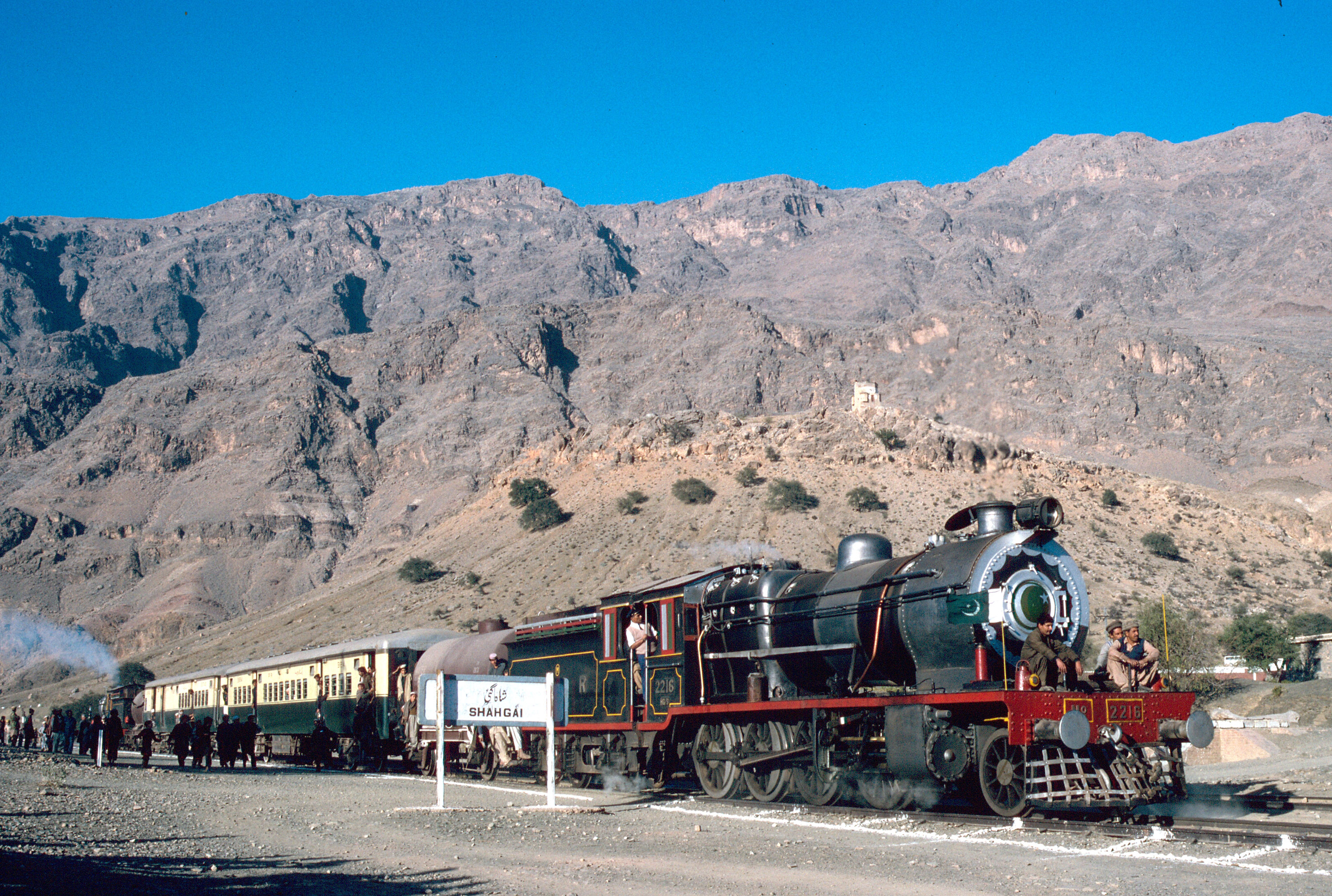

General information
- Owner: Ministry of Railways
- Line: Khyber Pass Railway

Other information
- Station code: SHGI

Services
Preceding station	Pakistan Railways	Following station
Chaghi towards Peshawar City	Khyber Pass Railway (defunct)	Kata Kushta towards Landi Khana
Location

Shahgai Railway Station (Urdu: شاہ گئی ریل گاڑی سٹیشن, Pashto: د شاہ گئی اورګاډي سټيشن) is located in Shagai, Khyber Pakhtunkhwa, Pakistan. It lies on the Khyber Safari line between Peshawar and Landi Kotal.

== See also ==
- List of railway stations in Pakistan
- Pakistan Railways
