= Torkham border crossing =

Location in Nangarhar Province, Afghanistan

Torkham border crossing تورخم بارڈر کراسنگ
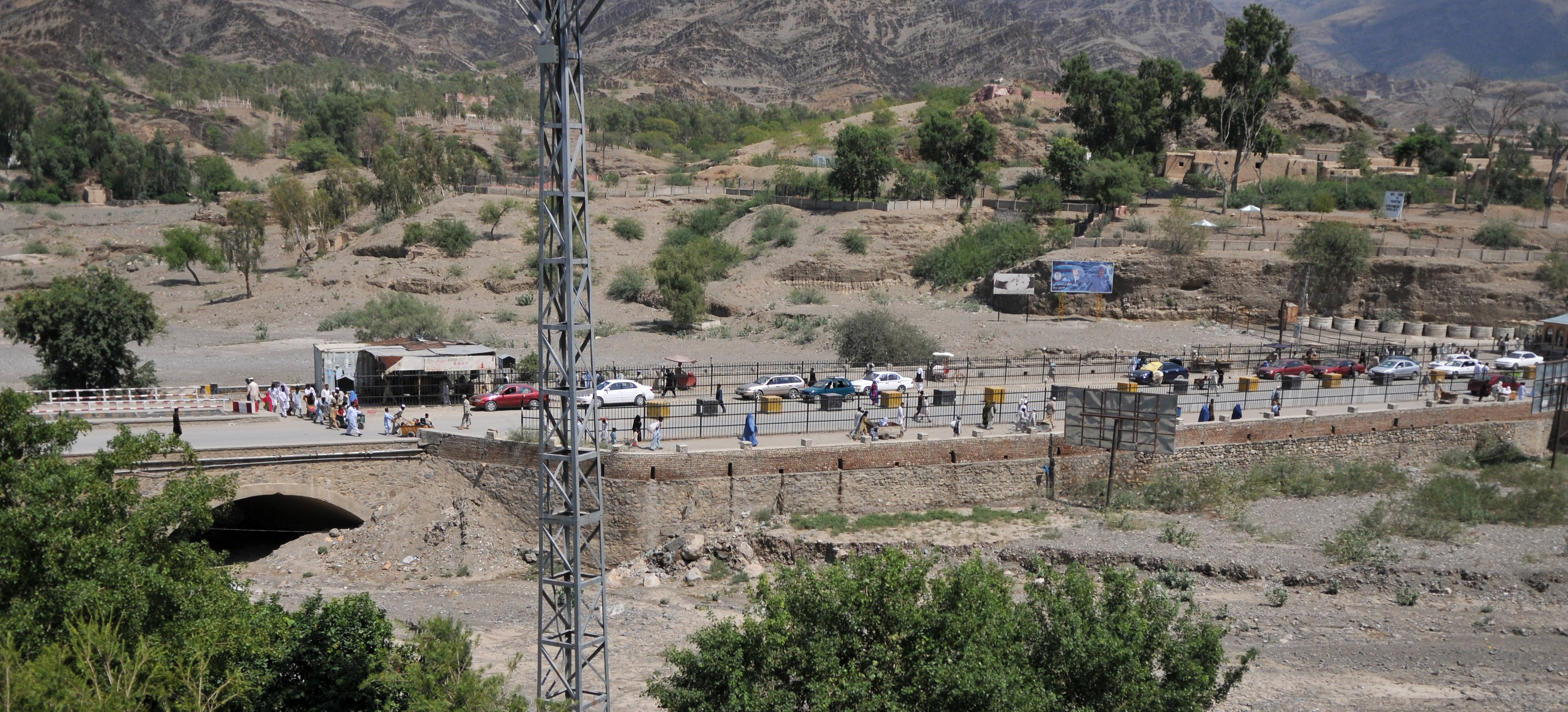
- View of Torkham Valley

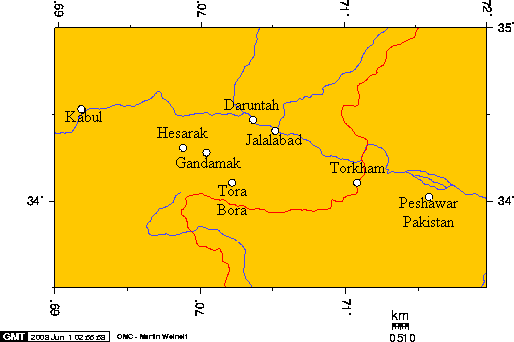
- Torkham, Peshawar, Kabul and some cities in pakistan and afghanistan

- Location in Afghanistan and Pakistan Torkham border crossing (Pakistan)
- Coordinates: 34°6′53″N 71°5′5″E
- Countries: Pakistan; Afghanistan
- Elevation: 2,579 ft (786 m)
- Time zone: UTC+4:30; UTC+05:00
- Control: (Afghanistan) Taliban; Pakistan

Torkham border crossing (Urdu, Persian, and Pashto: تورخم Tūrkham) is a major border crossing between the Pakistani city of Torkham and Afghanistan, located along the Grand Trunk Road on the international border between the two countries. It connects Nangarhar province of Afghanistan with Pakistan's Khyber Pakhtunkhwa province. It is the busiest port of entry between the two countries, serving as a major transporting, shipping, and receiving site.

Highway 8 connects Torkham to Kabul through Jalalabad. On the Pakistani side, the border crossing is at the end of the N-5 National Highway, which connects it to Peshawar in the east via the Khyber Pass and further connects it to Islamabad by other routes.

The Afghan Border Police and Pakistan's Frontier Corps are the main agencies for controlling Torkham. They are backed by the Pakistani and Afghan Armed Forces. Torkham belongs to the Momand Dara district of Nangarhar.

On 15 August 2021, Torkham was seized by Taliban fighters, becoming the second border crossing with Pakistan to be captured by Taliban as part of wider 2021 Taliban offensive. As a response, Pakistan temporarily closed the border crossing.

== History ==
The location has been used throughout history by Afghan and Turkic caravans, including marching armies of powerful empires. Most of these were on their way to Northern India, passing through Peshawar and then Lahore. Some of the well known regional historical figures who are believed to have passed through Torkham are Chandragupta Maurya, Hsüan-tsang, Jayapala, Al-Biruni, Ibn Battuta, Babur, Humayun, Nader Shah, Ahmad Shah Durrani, Zaman Shah Durrani, Dost Mohammad Khan, and Akbar Khan.

Over much of the last century, there have been proposals to extend the (defunct) Khyber rail service to Afghanistan and possibly beyond, passing through Jalalabad. In 2010, Pakistan and Afghanistan signed a Memorandum of understanding (MoU) for going ahead with the laying of rail tracks between the two countries. Work on the proposed project was supposed to start in 2010.

In November 2001 The New York Times reported that Torkham is Hajji Ali's hometown. Ali was an anti-Taliban militia leader who seized power after the Taliban retreated. It was reported that Hajji Ali had joined forces with two other militia leaders, Mawlawi Yunis Khalis, and Ezatullah, to set up a regional provisional government.

On the Pakistani side, Torkham lies at the end of the N-5 National Highway. It is connected to city of Peshawar in the east. Transported goods arrive to Torkham from the port city of Karachi in Sindh province. Torkham is 5 kilometres (3.1 mi) west of the summit of the Khyber Pass. It lies on the most important supply route for US-led NATO forces in Afghanistan. Pakistan's government sometimes block supplies due to the American use of drone strikes in Pakistan.

In April 2006 the Afghan Border Police began requiring travelers crossing the border at Torkham to possess valid travel documents.

Pakistan had completed the construction of a border gate, crossing terminal and other associated infrastructure on its side of Torkham border by July 2016. Border gate has been named as Bab-i-Pakistan and the crossing terminal has been named "Shaheed Major Ali Jawad Changezi terminal" after the officer lost his life in skirmishes with the Afghan security forces at the same border and in the clashes that resulted from the construction of this very gate. The flag hosting ceremony has also started just like the one at Wagah border crossing with India. Now no one will be allowed to cross border without proper documentations to check the infiltration of terrorists from Afghanistan into Pakistan. Work on the construction of the gate and associated facilities began in 2014 but kept getting delayed because of Afghan reservations and abrupt clashes. Pakistan plans to have similar border control measures at all six major crossing points between the two countries on the 2,600 km-long porous border.

The border has seen repeated closures in the Afghan-Pakistan standoffs.

== Climate ==
With an influence from the local steppe climate, Torkham features a hot semi-arid climate (Köppen BSh). The average temperature in Torkham is 20.3 °C, while the annual precipitation averages 407 mm. June is the driest month with an average rainfall of 8 mm, while the wettest month is March, with an average 82 mm of precipitation.

June is the hottest month of the year with an average temperature of 31.0 °C. The coldest month January has an average temperature of 8.4 °C.

Climate data for Torkham
Month	Jan	Feb	Mar	Apr	May	Jun	Jul	Aug	Sep	Oct	Nov	Dec	Year
Mean daily maximum °C (°F)	14.5 (58.1)	16.3 (61.3)	20.9 (69.6)	26.1 (79.0)	32.2 (90.0)	38.0 (100.4)	36.6 (97.9)	34.8 (94.6)	33.4 (92.1)	28.8 (83.8)	21.9 (71.4)	16.4 (61.5)	26.7 (80.0)
Daily mean °C (°F)	8.4 (47.1)	10.5 (50.9)	15.0 (59.0)	19.9 (67.8)	25.6 (78.1)	31.0 (87.8)	30.8 (87.4)	29.5 (85.1)	27.1 (80.8)	21.4 (70.5)	14.5 (58.1)	9.7 (49.5)	20.3 (68.5)
Mean daily minimum °C (°F)	2.3 (36.1)	4.7 (40.5)	9.1 (48.4)	13.7 (56.7)	18.7 (65.7)	24.0 (75.2)	25.1 (77.2)	24.2 (75.6)	20.8 (69.4)	14.1 (57.4)	7.2 (45.0)	3.1 (37.6)	13.9 (57.1)
Source: Climate-Data.org

== Gallery ==
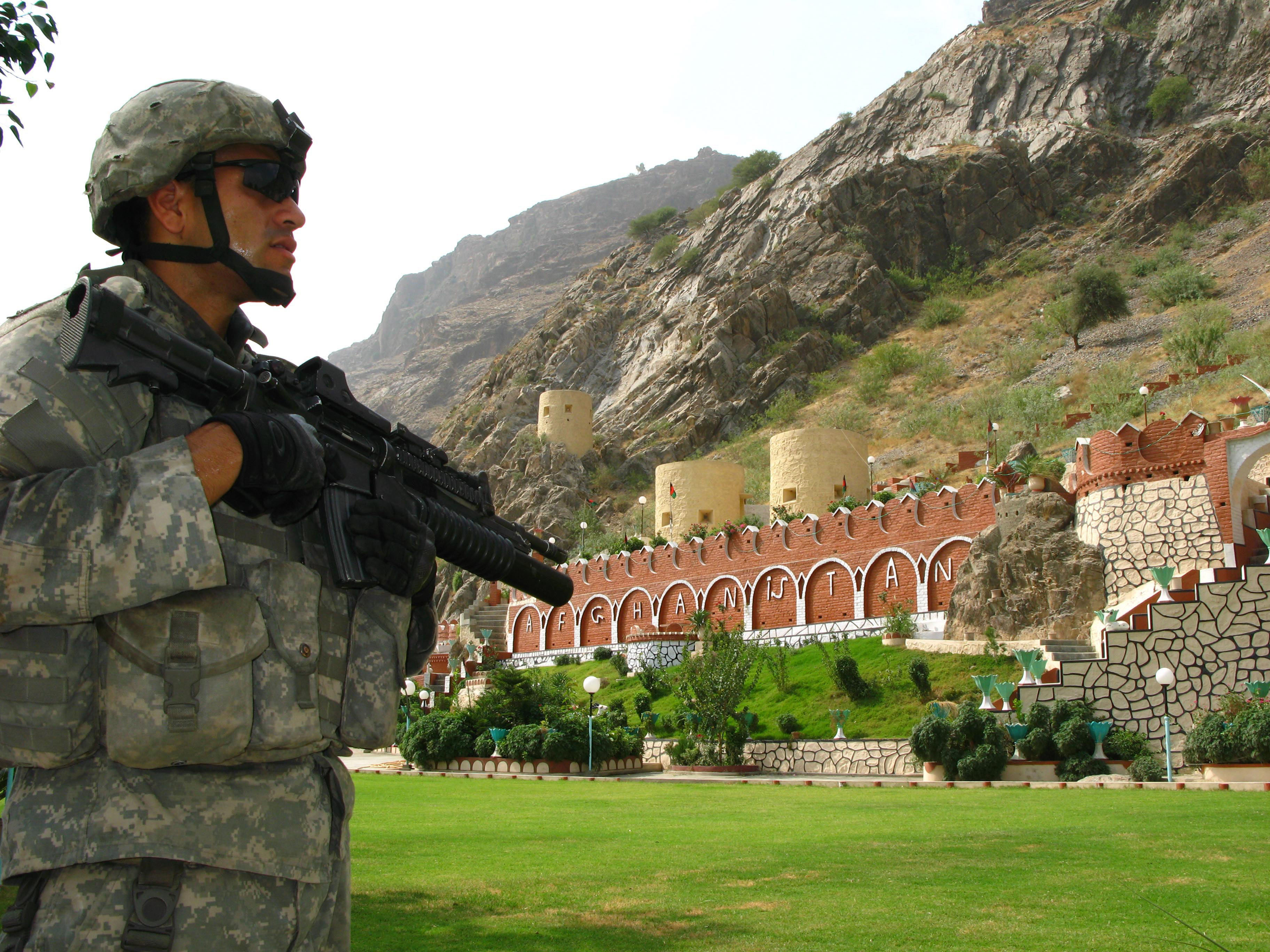
US soldier on the Afghan side of border in 2007

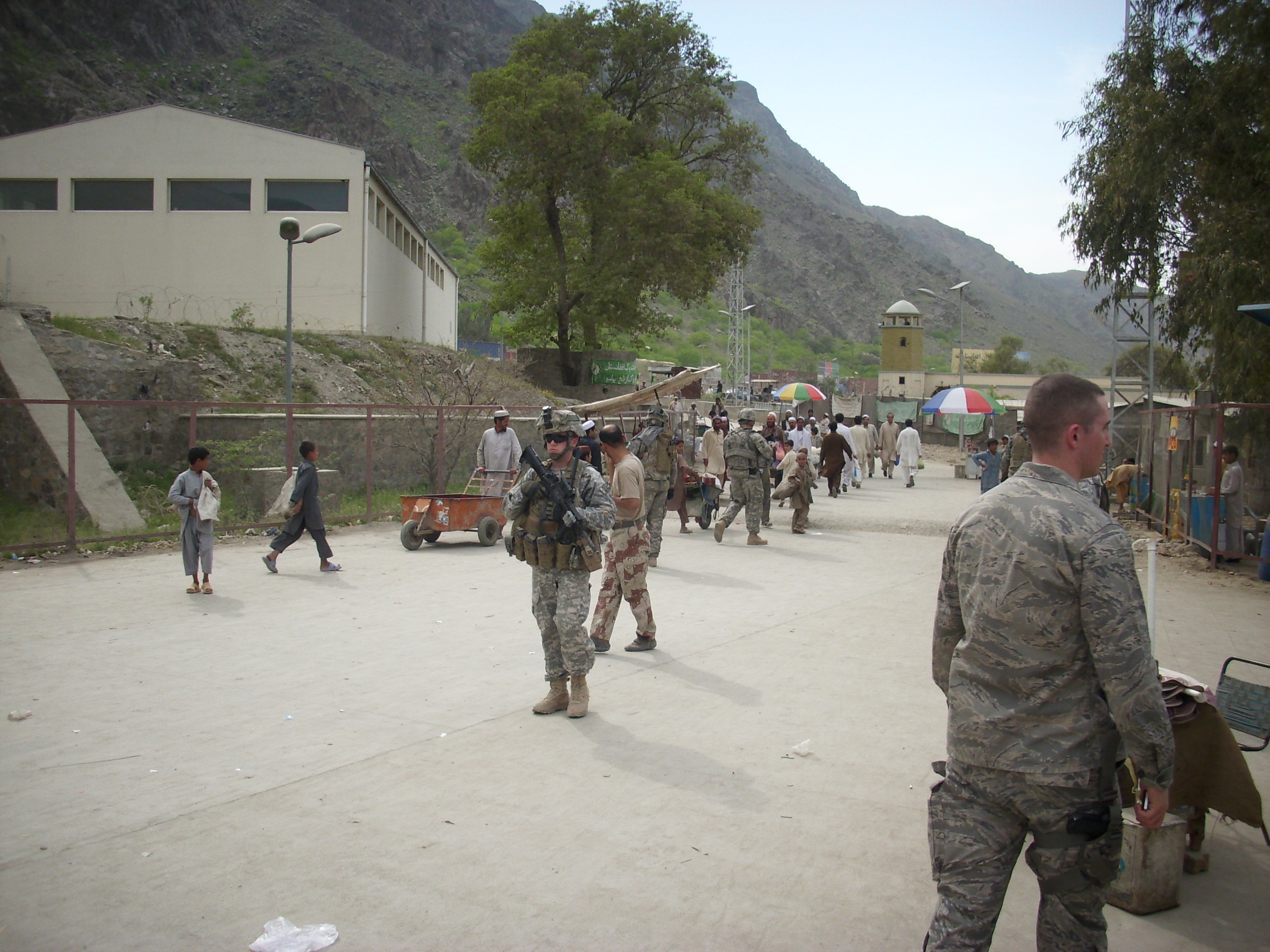
Combined Joint Task Force 82nd Soldiers and logistics units walk the Torkham border crossing area with CENTCOM Deployment and Distribution Operations Center Director, U.S. Air Force Maj. Gen. Robert McMahon, March 25, 2010, Torkham, Afghanistan.

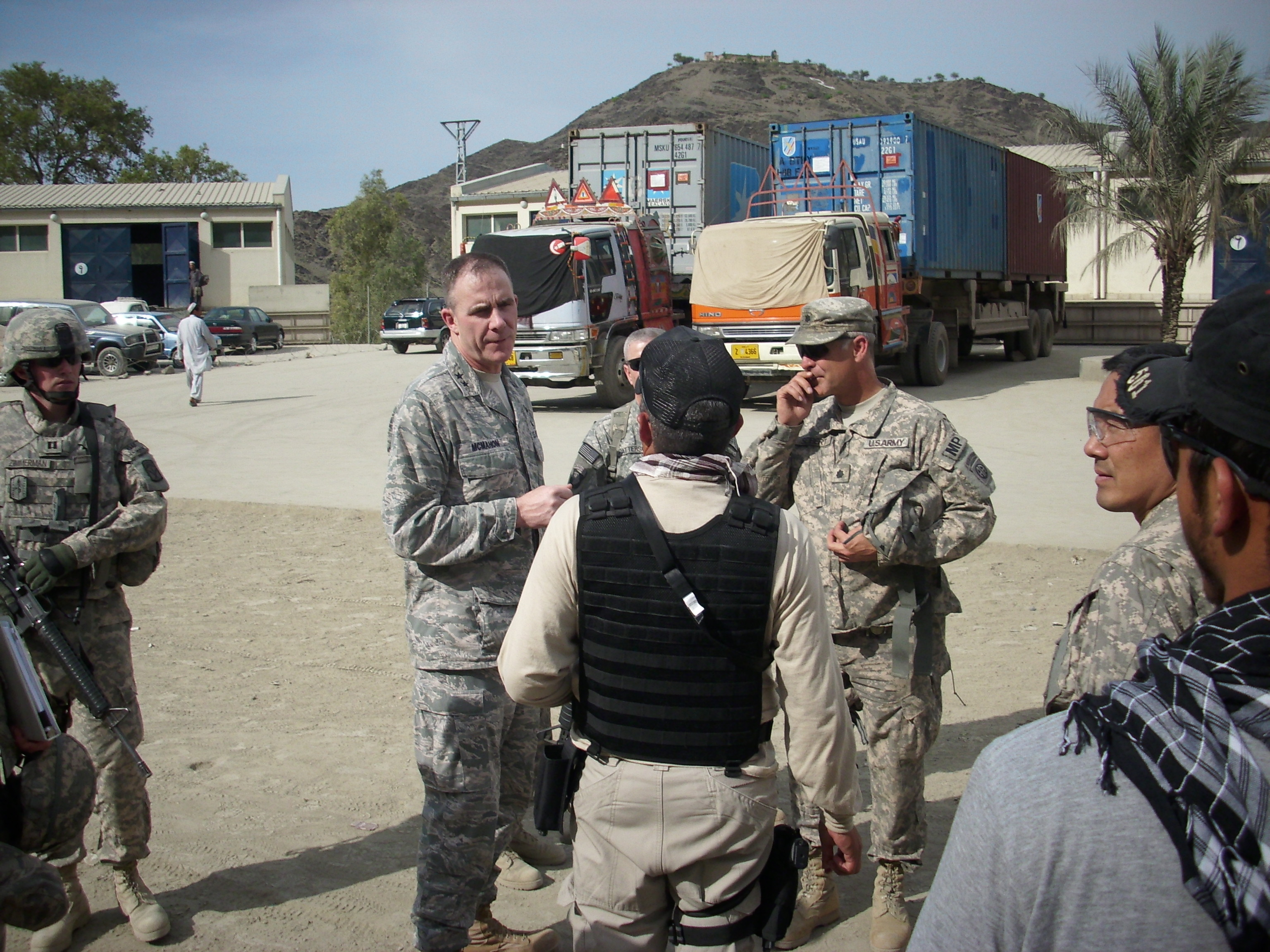
Combined Joint Task Force 82nd Soldiers and logistics units walk the Torkham border crossing area with CENTCOM Deployment and Distribution Operations Center Director, U.S. Air Force Maj. Gen. Robert McMahon, March 25, 2010, Torkham border, Afghan side.

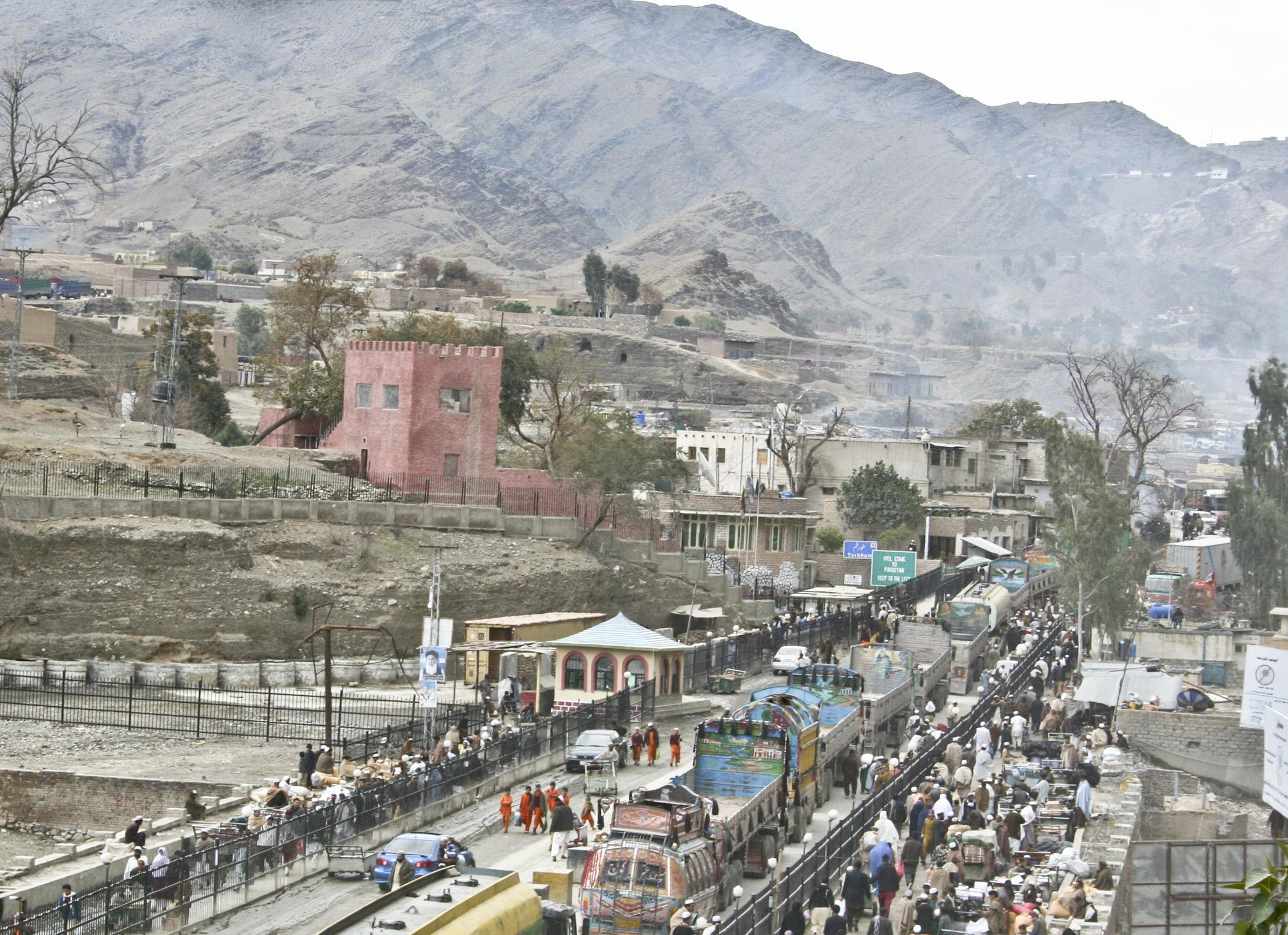
Trucks crossing into Pakistan's Khyber Pakhtunkhwa at Torkham in 2011

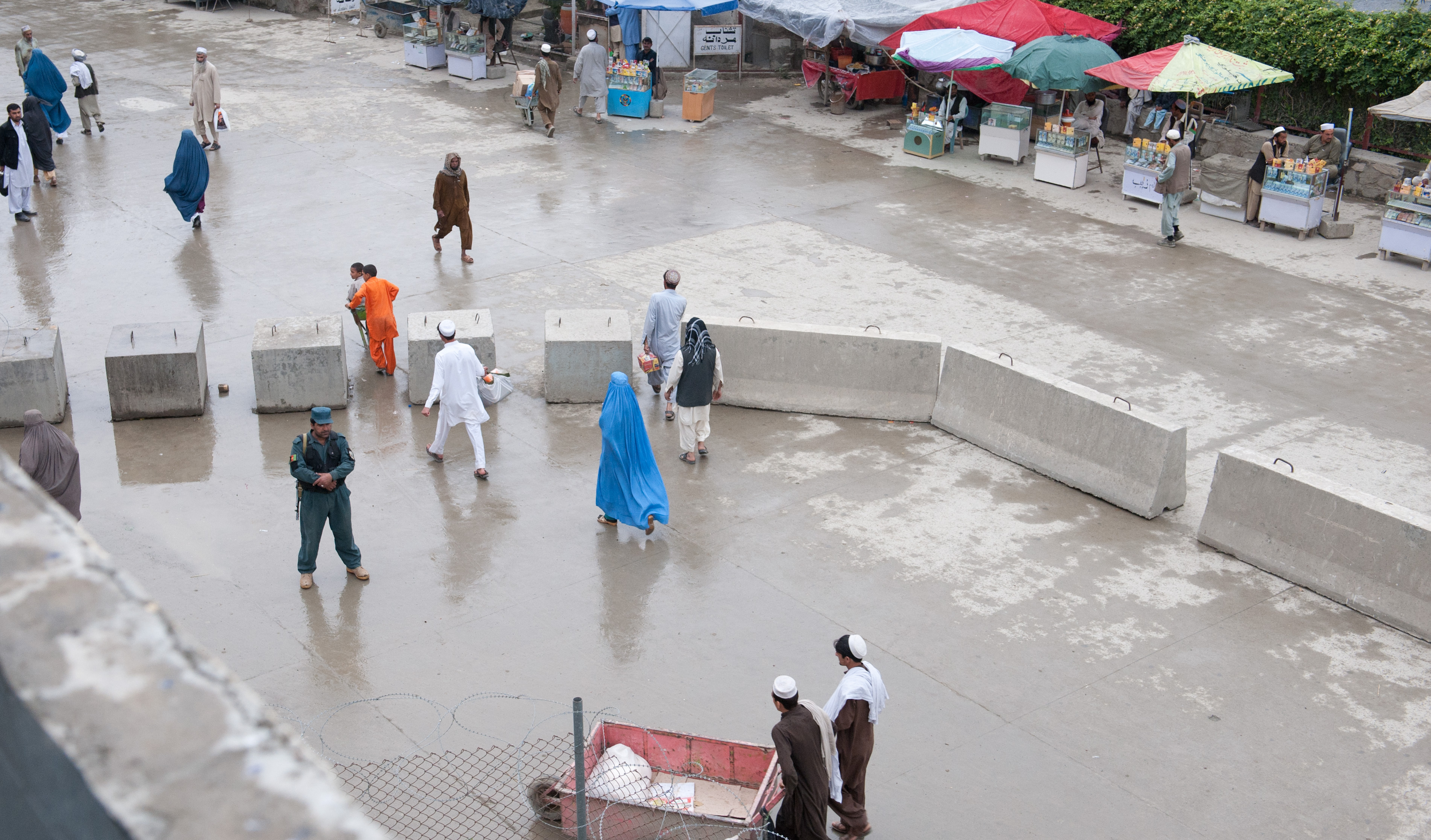
Afghanistan's entry point at Torkham

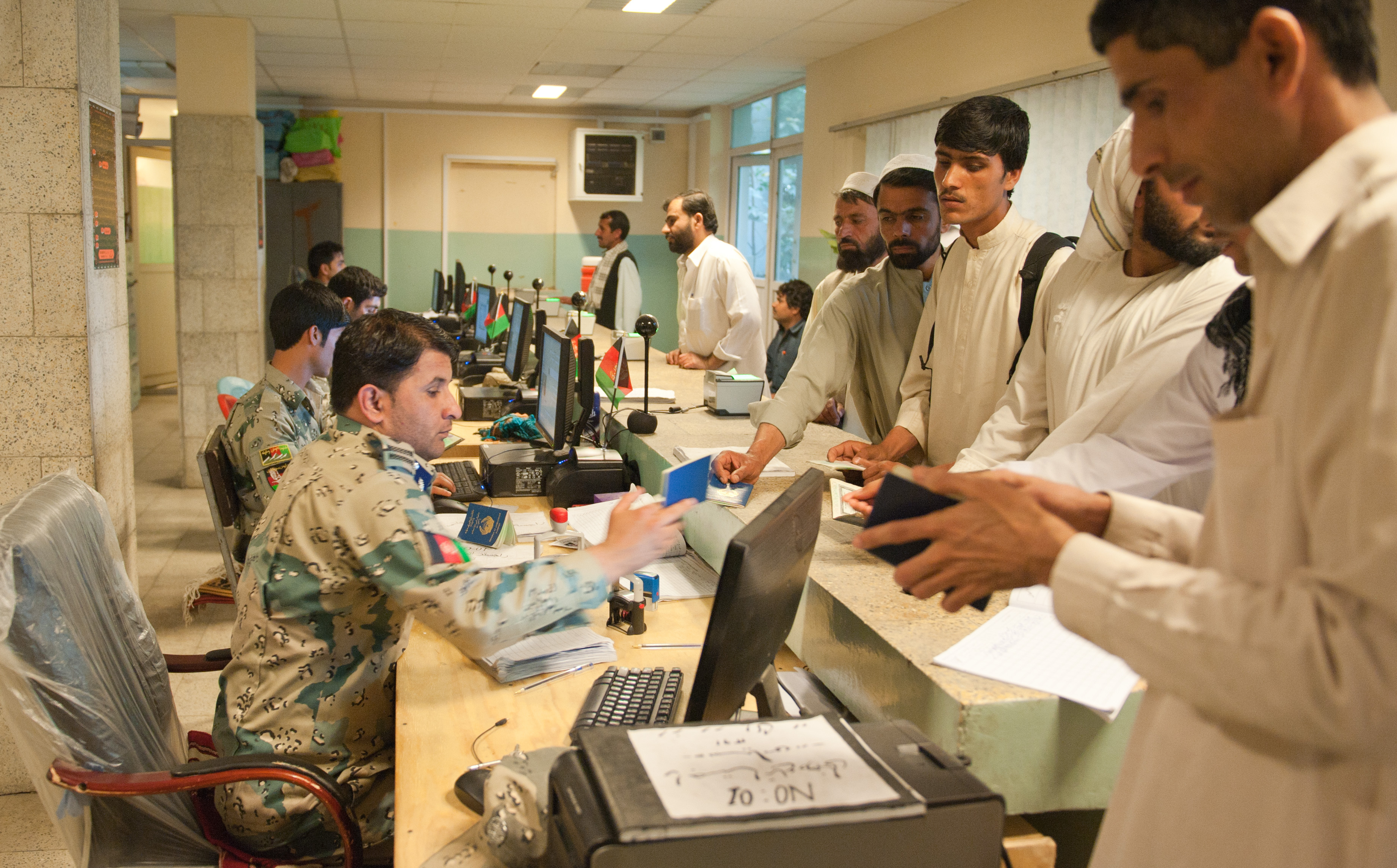
Inside the Afghan customs and border patrol station at Torkham

== See also ==
- Landi Kotal
- Khyber train safari
- Landi Khana railway station
- Wesh–Chaman border crossing
