= Medanak railway station =

Railway station in Pakistan

Coordinates: 34.007773°N 71.308325°E

Medanak Railway Station میڈانک ریلوے اسٹیشن

General information
- Owner: Ministry of Railways
- Line: Khyber Pass Railway

Other information
- Station code: MDNK

Services
| Preceding station | Pakistan Railways | Following station |
|---|---|---|
| Bagiarari towards Peshawar City | Khyber Pass Railway (defunct) | Chaghi towards Landi Khana |
Location

Medanak Railway Station (Urdu: میڈانک ریلوے اسٹیشن) is located in Pakistan. It is on the disused Khyber Pass Railway line and does not have scheduled train services.

== See also ==
- List of railway stations in Pakistan
- Pakistan Railways
