= Zintara railway station =

Railway station in Pakistan

Coordinates: 34.073518°N 71.220755°E

Zintara Railway Station زنتارا ریلوے اسٹیشن

General information
- Owner: Ministry of Railways
- Line: Khyber Pass Railway

Other information
- Station code: ZTA

Services
Preceding station	Pakistan Railways	Following station
Kata Kushta towards Peshawar City	Khyber Pass Railway (defunct)	Sultan Khel towards Landi Khana
Location

Zintara Railway Station (Urdu: زنتارا ریلوے اسٹیشن) is located in Khyber Pakhtunkhwa province of Pakistan. The station is on the discontinued Khyber Pass Railway line.

== See also ==
- List of railway stations in Pakistan
- Pakistan Railways
