= Pabbi railway station =

Railway station in Pakistan

Pabbi Railway Station پبی ریلوے اسٹیشن

General information
- Coordinates: 34.0132°N 71.7810°E
- Owner: Ministry of Railways
- Lines: Karachi–Peshawar Railway Line; Peshawar Circular Railway

Other information
- Station code: PBI

History
- Opened: 1882

Services
Preceding station	Pakistan Railways	Following station
Pir Piai towards Kiamari	Karachi–Peshawar Line	Taru Jabba towards Peshawar Cantonment
Preceding station	Peshawar Circular Railway	Following station
Nasarpur towards Peshawar Cantonment	(proposed)	Pir Piai towards Charsadda
Location

Pabbi Railway Station (Urdu: پببی ریلوے اسٹیشن, Pashto: د پببی اورګاډي سټيشن) is located in Pabbi village Khudrezai Nowshera district in Pakistan's Khyber Pakhtunkhwa province. Pabbi Station is within walking distance of the famous Grand Trunk Road (G.T. Road). The railway track itself runs parallel to the G.T. Road for a considerable stretch. Pabbi station was once one of the first major train stops for trains originating from Peshawar.

== See also ==
- List of railway stations in Pakistan
- Pakistan Railways
