= Bagiari railway station =

Railway station in Pakistan

Coordinates: 33.9986°N 71.3248°E

Bagiari Railway Station باگیاری ریلوے اسٹیشن

General information
- Owner: Ministry of Railways
- Line: Khyber Pass Railway

Other information
- Station code: BGRI

Services
Preceding station	Pakistan Railways	Following station
Jamrud Junction towards Peshawar City	Khyber Pass Railway (defunct)	Medanak towards Landi Khana
Location
- Location within Khyber Pakhtunkhwa Location within Pakistan

Bagiari Railway Station (Urdu: باگیاری ریلوے اسٹیشن) is located in Pakistan. The station is on the discontinued Khyber Pass Railway line and does not have scheduled train services.

== See also ==
- List of railway stations in Pakistan
- Pakistan Railways
