= Chaghi railway station =

Railway station in Chagai, Pakistan

Chaghi Railway Station چاغی ریلوے اسٹیشن

General information
- Owner: Ministry of Railways
- Line: Khyber Pass Railway

Other information
- Station code: GNGI

Services
Preceding station	Pakistan Railways	Following station
Medanak towards Peshawar City	Khyber Pass Railway (defunct)	Shahgai towards Landi Khana
Location

Chaghi Railway Station (Urdu: چاغی ریلوے اسٹیشن) is located in Khyber Pakhtunkhwa Pakistan. The station is on the discontinued Khyber Pass Railway line and has no scheduled train services.

== See also ==
- List of railway stations in Pakistan
- Pakistan Railways
