= Sultan Khel railway station =

Railway station in Pakistan

Sultan Khel Railway Station د سلطان خېلو د اورګاډي اډه

General information
- Owner: Ministry of Railways
- Line: Khyber Pass Railway

Other information
- Station code: STKI

Services
Preceding station	Pakistan Railways	Following station
Zintara towards Peshawar City	Khyber Pass Railway (defunct)	Landi Kotal towards Landi Khana
Location

Sultan Khel Railway Station (Pashto: د سلطان خېلو د اورګاډي اډه; Urdu: سلطان خیل ریلوے اسٹیشن) is located in Khyber Pakhtunkhwa province of Pakistan. The station is on the discontinued Khyber Pass Railway line and no longer has scheduled train services.

== See also ==
- List of railway stations in Pakistan
- Pakistan Railways
