= Peshawar Circular Railway =

Proposed inter-regional commuter rail system

Peshawar Circular Railway پشاور سرکلر ریلوے د پېښور حلقوي رېلوې

Overview
- Owner: Government of Khyber Pakhtunkhwa
- Locale: Greater Peshawar
- Headquarters: Peshawar, Khyber Pakhtunkhwa, Pakistan

Peshawar Circular Railway (Urdu: پشاور سرکلر ریلوے; Pashto: د پېښور حلقوي رېلوې; abbreviated PCR) or Greater Peshawar Mass-Transit Circular Rail Project is a proposed inter-regional commuter rail system for the Peshawar Valley or Greater Peshawar metropolitan area which aims to connect several industrial and commercial districts within Peshawar to the outlying suburbs and cities of Jamrud, Charsadda, Mardan, Nowshera, with future expansion to Swabi. The PCR will primarily serve the Metropolitan Peshawar region, with operations extending to several other communities. In August 2016, the Government of Khyber Pakhtunkhwa signed a $1.6 billion memorandum of understanding (MoU) with China Communication and Construction Company for the project. This railway is expected to resolve transportation problems in the Peshawar region and generate jobs leading to the overall economic revival of the province. However, there had been little progress towards realizing the project until early 2024.

According to the MoU, China Communication and Construction Company shall conduct a feasibility study, inclusive of concept design, cost estimation and will prepare a technical and financial proposal to the provincial government in respect of the development of the project. It would also provide technical specification to government for the soil investigation and survey. The Government of Khyber Pakhtunkhwa shall be responsible for obtaining all approvals permits, land rights and other necessary permissions to enable the company to complete the feasibility work. The government will facilitate the company to fulfill its obligations and responsibilities by providing available relevant local technical information and other necessary documents available in respect of project. The financial model for the project has to be agreed between the parties prior to commencement of the project through an agreement to be signed after fulfilling all legal and codal formalities.

In August 2026 the Government of Khyber Pakhtunkhwa signed a framework agreement with the Ministry of Railways towards the project, about Rs.500 million were allocated for restoration of historic train stations.

== Route ==
- Peshawar Cantonment
- Peshawar City
- Nasarpur
- Taru Jabba
- Pabbi
- Pir Piai
- Khushhal
- Nowshera Junction
- Mardan Junction
- Charsadda

Charsadda-Peshawar rail link yet to be constructed

== See also ==
- Karachi Circular Railway
- Peshawar Metro
- Transport in Pakistan
