= Kata Kushta railway station =

Railway station in Pakistan

Coordinates: 34°03′N 71°15′E

Kata Kushta Railway Station کٹا کشتہ ریلوے اسٹیشن

General information
- Owner: Ministry of Railways
- Line: Khyber Pass Railway

Other information
- Station code: KKST

Services
Preceding station	Pakistan Railways	Following station
Shahgai towards Peshawar City	Khyber Pass Railway (defunct)	Zintara towards Landi Khana
Location

Kata Kushta Railway Station (Urdu: کٹا کشتہ ریلوے اسٹیشن) is located in Khyber Pakhtunkhwa province of Pakistan. The station is on the discontinued Khyber Pass Railway line and does not have scheduled train services.

== See also ==
- List of railway stations in Pakistan
- Pakistan Railways
