= Torra Tigga railway station =

Railway station in Pakistan

Torra Tigga Railway Station د تورې تیږې د اورګاډي اډه

General information
- Owner: Ministry of Railways
- Line: Khyber Pass Railway

Other information
- Station code: TRTG

Services
Preceding station	Pakistan Railways	Following station
Landi Kotal towards Peshawar City	Khyber Pass Railway (defunct)	Landi Khana Terminus
Location

Torra Tigga Railway Station (Pashto: د تورې تیږې د اورګاډي اډه; Urdu: تورہ تیگہ ریلوے اسٹیشن) is located in Khyber Pakhtunkhwa province of Pakistan. The station is on the discontinued Khyber Pass Railway line and does not have scheduled train services. The route was closed in 2006 after damage to the track due to extensive flooding.

== See also ==
- List of railway stations in Pakistan
- Pakistan Railways
