= Khyber Pass Railway =

Abandoned railway line in Pakistan

Overview
- Native name: درۂ خیبر ریلوے
- Status: Suspended
- Owner: Pakistan Railways
- Termini: Peshawar City; Landi Khana
- Stations: 13

Service
- Operator: Pakistan Railways

History
- Opened: November 4, 1925

Technical
- Line length: 53 km (33 mi)
- Track gauge: 1,676 mm (5 ft 6 in)

The Khyber Pass Railway (Urdu: درۂ خیبر ریلوے) was one of several railway lines in Pakistan, operated and maintained by Pakistan Railways. The line began at Peshawar City and ended at Landi Khana. The total length of the line is 53 kilometers (33 mi), and there are 12 railway stations.

Passenger train traffic on the route has been suspended due to security concerns and the 2006 monsoon rains, which washed away several sections of the tracks and damaged bridges.

== History ==
The Great Game was responsible for the creation of the Khyber Pass Railway. The British were convinced that the Russian Empire was planning to invade the British Raj. The most obvious routes for any invasion was through the Khyber Pass or the Bolan Pass, and so it was suggested that strategic railways be built in both of these passes. In 1879, a reconnaissance survey was conducted to examine the feasibility of laying railways through the two passes (Sind–Pishin State Railway) to thwart any Russian invasion.

In 1905, the North Western State Railway began construction of the line at the village of Kacha Garhi, located between Peshawar and Jamrud. The broad gauge track made progress westwards and 32 kilometers (20 mi) of track had been laid by 1907. On 31 August 1907, the Anglo-Russian Entente was signed between the United Kingdom and Russia in St. Petersburg, Russia. The agreement ended the shaky British–Russian relationship and solidified boundaries, particularly in Afghanistan. The new alliance and boundary agreement meant that Russia was no longer a threat to the British, and work on the railway stopped.

In 1909, several kilometres of permanent way, and some bridges, were removed from the Khyber Pass Railway to be used on other lines being constructed by the North Western State Railway. In 1920, work restarted on the Khyber Pass Railway, and the proposal to use broad gauge was adopted.

Victor Bailey was the engineer who oversaw the construction of the line. The section from Jamrud to Landi Kotal was opened on 3 November 1925, by the wife of the engineer. The train took passengers through rugged mountainous terrain, reaching a height of 1,200 m (3,900 ft), to reach Landi Kotal, covering a distance of 52 km (32 mi), with 34 tunnels, 92 bridges and culverts and a zig-zag between Landi Kotal and Landi Khana.

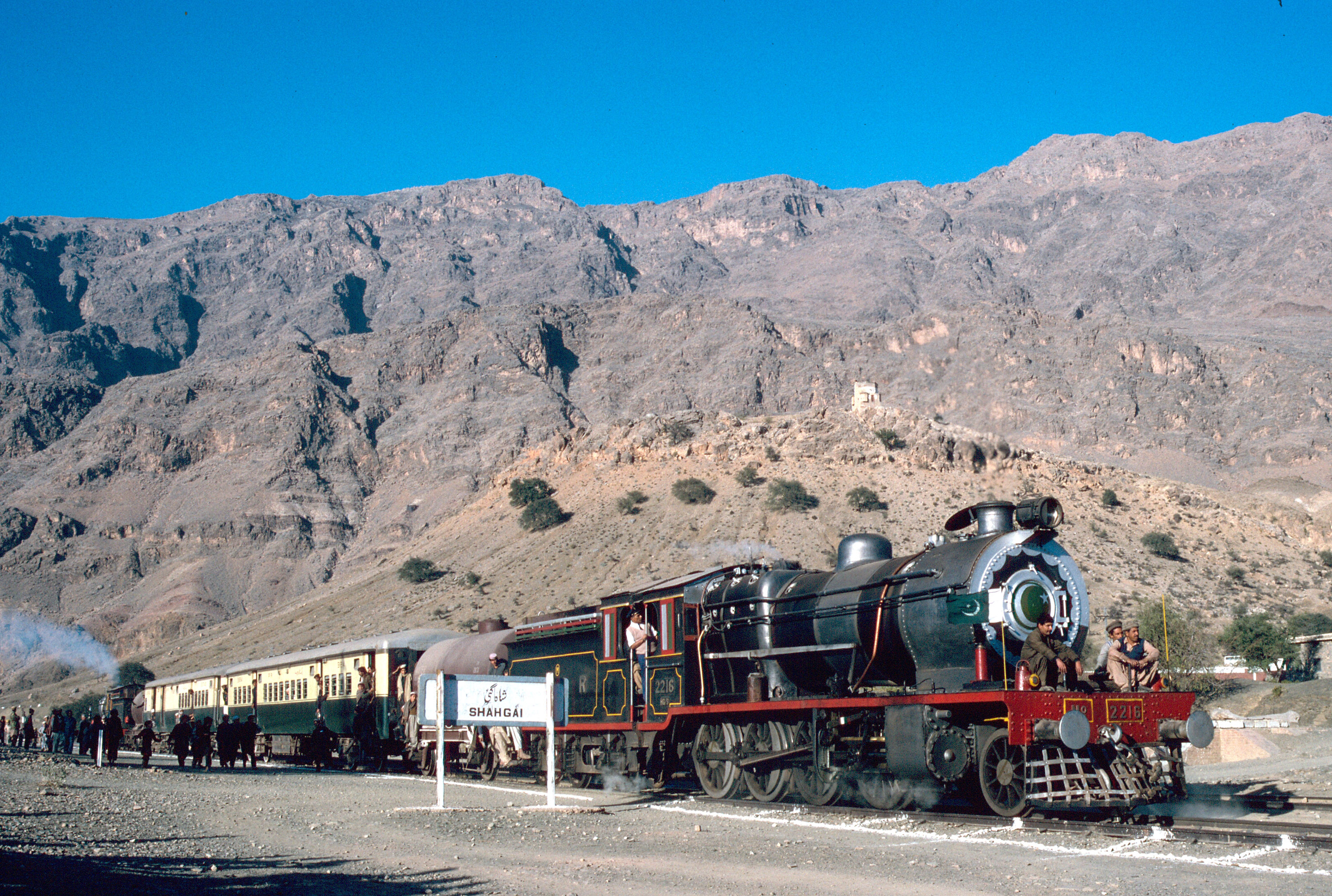
A tourist train on the Khyber Pass Railway in 1993.

The oil-fired steam engines, which pushed and pulled the carriages from the rear and front, were built in the United Kingdom by Vulcan Foundry and by Kitson & Co. An unusual feature of the train journey was that its route passed across the main runway of Peshawar Airport.) On 3 April 1926, the railway was extended to Landi Khana, just three kilometres from the Torkham border crossing with Afghanistan. In 1932, the Landi Kotal to Landi Khana section of railway was closed at the insistence of Afghan government. Regularly scheduled rail services continued between Peshawar and Landi Kotal until they ended in 1982 due lack of commercial value.

The 2008 monsoon rains in the Khyber Pass washed away significant sections of the railway, and the track was closed to all rail traffic.

=== Proposed revival ===
In 2010, Pakistan Railways began a feasibility study to rebuild the Khyber Pass railway and to possibly extend it further west to Jalalabad, Afghanistan. However, work stalled due to the poor security situation along the Pakistan-Afghanistan border.

In 2016, the Afghan Ministry of Public Works began a survey of the railway line from the Pakistan border to Jalalabad. Nangarhar's governor directed relevant authorities to cooperate in undertaking the survey. Afghanistan has also put forth proposals and requests to further extend the railway to Kabul. The Afghanistan Chamber of Commerce & Industries (ACCI) said that the new railway line would facilitate trade with Pakistan.

== Stations ==
- Peshawar City
- Peshawar Cantonment
- Jamrud
- Bagiarari
- Medanak (1st Reversing Station)
- Chaghi (2nd Reversing Station)
- Shahgai
- Kata Kushta
- Zintara
- Sultan Khel
- Landi Kotal
- Torra Tigga (3rd Reversing Station)
- Landi Khana (4th Reversing Station)
