= Khushhal railway station =

Railway station in Pakistan

Khushhal Railway Station خوشحال ریلوے اسٹیشن

General information
- Coordinates: 34.0095°N 71.9389°E
- Owner: Ministry of Railways
- Lines: Karachi–Peshawar Railway Line; Peshawar Circular Railway

Other information
- Station code: KHLK

Services
Preceding station	Pakistan Railways	Following station
Nowshera Junction towards Kiamari	Karachi–Peshawar Line	Pir Piai towards Peshawar Cantonment
Preceding station	Peshawar Circular Railway	Following station
Pir Piai towards Peshawar Cantonment	(proposed)	Nowshera Junction towards Charsadda
Location

Khushhal Railway Station (Urdu: خوشحال ریلوے اسٹیشن, Pashto: د خوشحال اورګاډي سټيشن) is located in Khushhal village, Nowshera district in Pakistan's Khyber Pakhtunkhwa province. This is on the Karachi–Peshawar Railway Line.

== See also ==
- List of railway stations in Pakistan
- Pakistan Railways
