= Second Anglo-Afghan Treaty (1857) =

1857 treaty between the British and Afghans

- Type: Bilateral Treaty
- Signed: 1857
- Location: Jamrud, East India Company (now Pakistan)
- Original signatories: United Kingdom; East India Company; Afghanistan

The Second Anglo-Afghan Treaty was signed in 1857, prior to the Indian Rebellion of 1857. This treaty saw significant gains for Dost Mohammad Khan. Following the signing of the treaty, Dost Mohammad Khan was pressured after the Sepoy Mutiny was begun in India. This was emphasized internally from the Ulama, and Afghan chiefs, while externally, Bukhara threatened conflict with Dost Mohammad if he did not declare war on the British.

British statesmen feared an Afghan invasion would see the end of British India as they knew it, and it nearly progressed as such until Dost Mohammad later affirmed his neutrality.

== Treaty ==
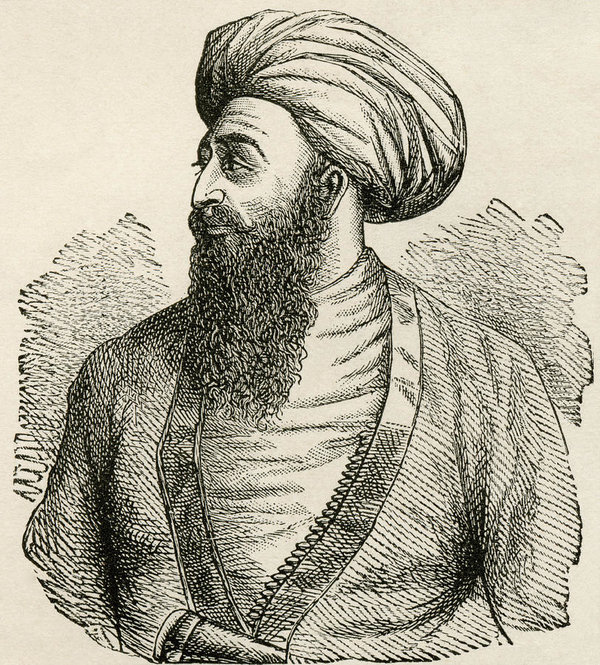
Sketch of Dost Mohammad Khan

The Governor General of British India supplied Dost Mohammad Khan with 4,000 muskets sent to Kandahar, as well as ammunition and gunpowder, and 500,000 rupees in response to the Persian siege of Herat and another Bukharan expedition conducted into the Chahar Wilayat. The British attempted to persuade Dost Mohammad Khan to get involved with the Persian siege of Herat and immediately enter war against them, but their aid didn't come in time for them to persuade him. This brought together the idea of a second Anglo-Afghan treaty, which was favored by Dost Mohammad to further strengthen his position. The British acknowledged Dost Mohammad Khan's control over Balkh and Kandahar, strengthening his power and legitimacy over the two territories, as well as being guaranteed British assistance for Dost Mohammad to protect the region. This second treaty was beneficial to Dost Mohammad Khan. Dost Mohammad was also provided with monthly payments of 100,000 rupees and military equipment, which were intended to last for as long as the Anglo-Persian War, but were actually given to him until October 1858. During this time, the British government would give the Afghan government almost 2.6 million rupees in addition to providing them with additional equipment valued around 160,000 rupees. The treaty took place at Jamrud.

== Sepoy Mutiny and Afghan pressure ==
The day after the second Anglo-Afghan treaty was signed, an arson attack occurred in Calcutta, and a month following, the Bengal infantry mutinied.

As the sepoy mutiny began in India, Dost Mohammad Khan faced pressure internally, and externally from Bukhara to wage Jihad and reclaim Peshawar from the British. In a letter from Nasrullah Khan, the ruler of Bukhara, Bukhara would relinquish all claim to Afghan Turkestan, while also warning Dost Mohammad that Bukhara was prepared for war if the Afghans continued pursuing diplomatic ties with the British. This offer was further tempting since the British were being forced to withdraw much of its company troops from Peshawar and the border with Afghanistan. This led to many Ulama and tribal leaders insisting Dost Mohammad to pursue the opportunity of Jihad. From the Afghan point of view, by beginning war against the British, Dost Mohammad could end the dispute with Bukhara over Afghan Turkestan, thus allowing Dost Mohammad Khan to withdraw troops from Balkh itself to commit a war against the British and reclaim Peshawar, or even additional territories. This war would also unite Afghan tribes under his rule further and earn him the title of Ghazi.

The offer to Dost Mohammad was very tempting, and he decided to summon a private meeting with senior family members to discuss the benefits and consequences of such an invasion. After several hours of debate, the majority of the Sardars came to the conclusion that they would upkeep their treaty with the British. Believing Nasrullah Khan would enact on his promise of going to war, Dost Mohammad stalled for time and did not inform the Bukharan ambassador of the decision reached, and instead sent a message that implied neither direct consent nor disagreement to what was proposed by Nasrullah Khan. On 7 May, the Bukharan ambassador was given audience with Dost Mohammad once again, and Dost Mohammad Khan informed the ambassador of the treatment he received in Bukhara during the First Anglo-Afghan War when he was a fugitive on the run from the British and Shah Shuja. Dost Mohammad is quoted to have said:

"How can I ... believe the word of the King of Bokhara and break so good a union as the one which I have made with the British. If I had known the King of Bokhara to be true, I would have never joined the British, and I well know that my own kingdom, and that of Bokhara, will one day be annexed to the British territories. I have therefore entered into an alliance ... with a view to keeping my country as long as possible."

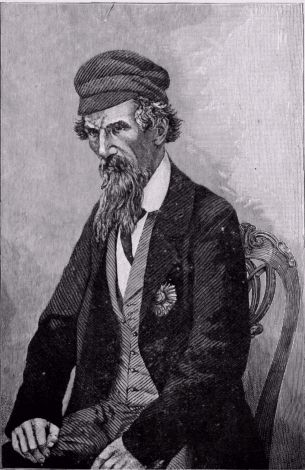
Portrait of Henry Lawrence

Henry Lawrence, the British resident in Lahore, having heard of the news of Dost Mohammad's decision to uphold his neutrality, perceived it as a "god send". According to Jonathan Lee, Henry Lawrence remarked:

"It is clear that, if we had been on bad terms just now with Kabul, we should have lost, first Peshawar and then the Punjab and all India would have reeled under the blow."

Lord Roberts view, which was widely agreed on, stated:

"Had Dost Mohammad turned against the British, I do not see how any part of the country north of Bengal that could be saved."

Numerous of the British officers who quelled the Sepoy uprising were from the Punjab and the Northwestern Frontier on Afghanistan, with many having gained experience as Junior officers in the First Anglo-Afghan War.

== See also ==
- First Anglo-Afghan War
- History of Afghanistan
- Shah Shuja Durrani
- Wazir Akbar Khan
