= Pir Piai railway station =

Railway station in Pakistan

Pir Piai Railway Station پیر پیائی ریلوے اسٹیشن
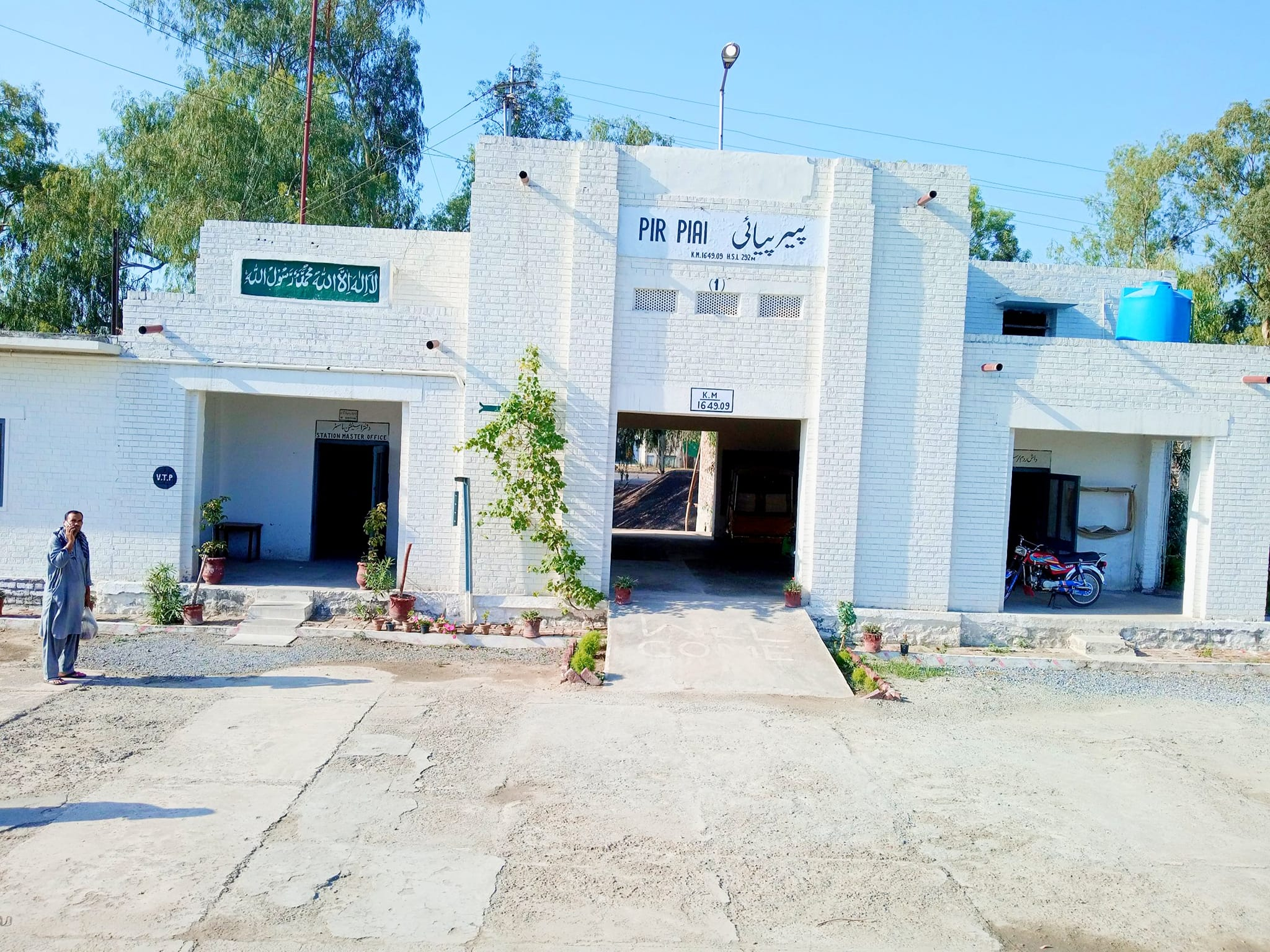

General information
- Coordinates: 34.0096°N 71.8973°E
- Owner: Ministry of Railways
- Lines: Karachi–Peshawar Railway Line; Peshawar Circular Railway

Other information
- Station code: PII

Services
Preceding station	Pakistan Railways	Following station
Khushhal towards Kiamari	Karachi–Peshawar Line	Pabbi towards Peshawar Cantonment
Preceding station	Peshawar Circular Railway	Following station
Pabbi towards Peshawar Cantonment	(proposed)	Khushhal towards Charsadda
Location

Pir Piai Railway Station (Urdu: پیر پیائی ریلوے اسٹیشن, Pashto: د پیر پیائی اورګاډي سټيشن) is located in Pir Piai village, Nowshera district, in Pakistan's Khyber Pakhtunkhwa province. The station is on the Karachi–Peshawar Railway Line.

== Gallery ==
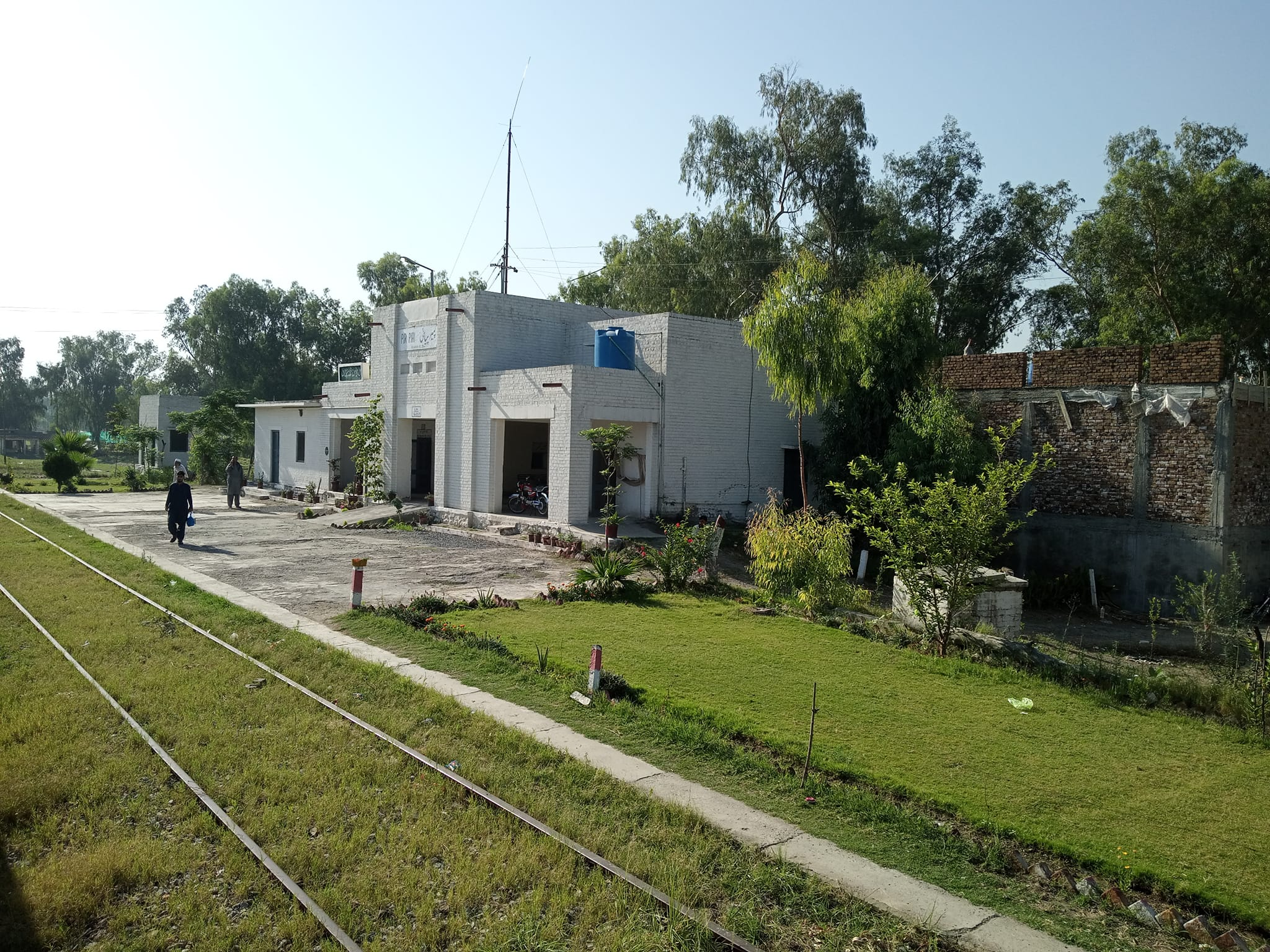

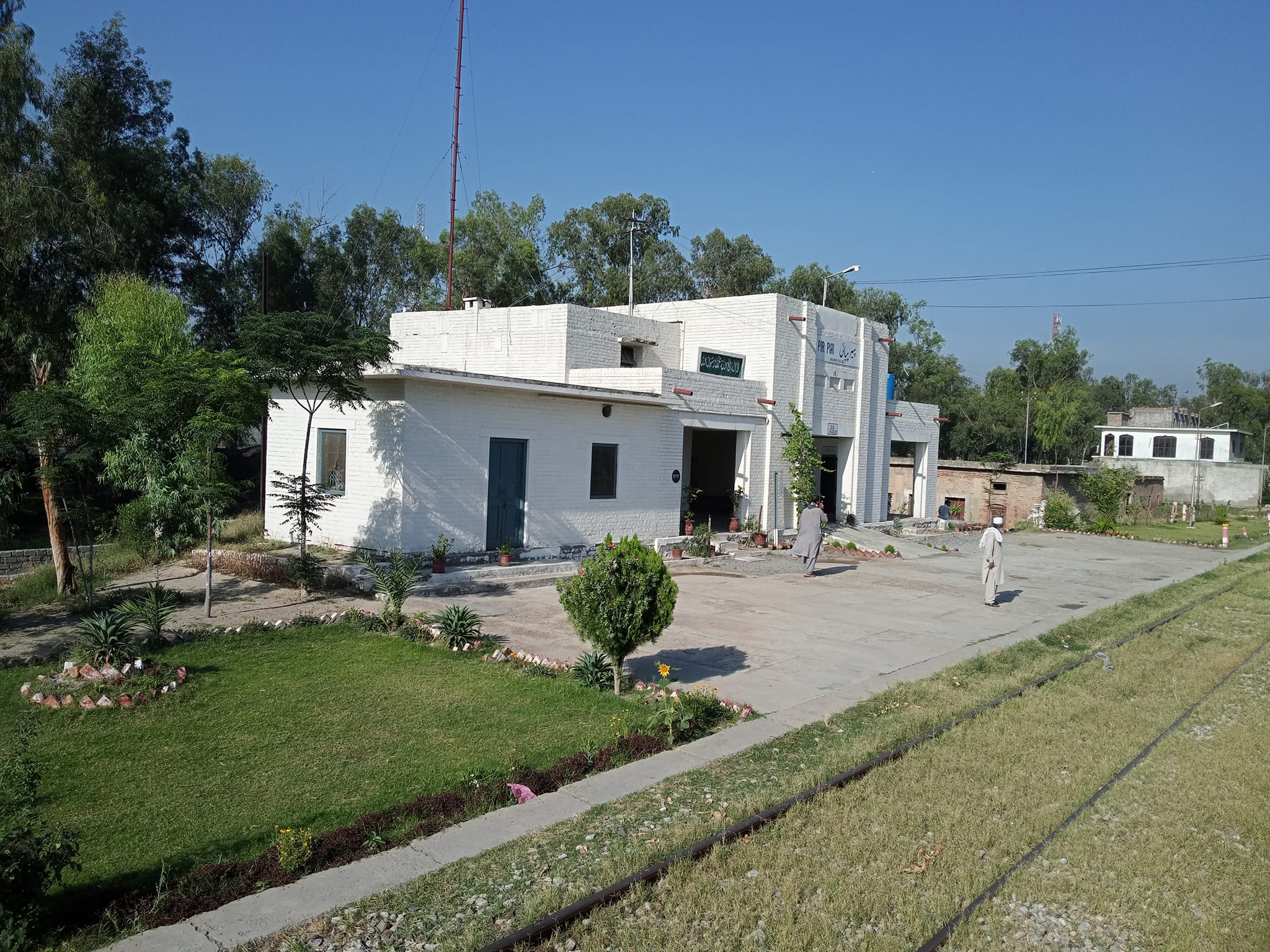

== See also ==
- List of railway stations in Pakistan
- Pakistan Railways
