= Attock Khurd railway station =

Railway station in Punjab province, Pakistan

Attock Khurd Railway Station اٹک خورد ریلوے اسٹیشن
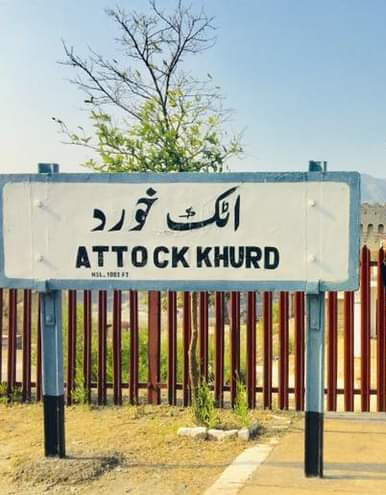

General information
- Coordinates: 33.8736°N 72.2409°E
- Elevation: 1,003 feet (306 m)
- Owner: Ministry of Railways
- Line: Karachi–Peshawar Railway Line

Other information
- Station code: ATKD

History
- Opened: 1884

Services
Preceding station	Pakistan Railways	Following station
Rumian towards Kiamari	Karachi–Peshawar Line	Khairabad Kund towards Peshawar Cantonment
Location

Attock Khurd Railway Station (Urdu and Punjabi: اٹک خورد ریلوے اسٹیشن) is located in the town of Attock Khurd, Attock district, Punjab province, Pakistan.

The railway station building is a Victorian structure made of stone masonry and surrounded by the Manglot Mountain Range. The station is located near the iron-girder Attock Bridge, built in 1883, which connects Khyber Pakhtunkhwa and Punjab.

Special train excursions have operated to this station.

Only a few trains stop at the station, even though it is on the main Karachi-Peshawar-Karachi line. That has been said to be due to few passengers using the station.

The main access to the station is a road that branches off via G.T. Road, which is six kilometres away.

== Services ==
The following trains originate/stop at Attock Khurd station:

Preceding station	Pakistan Railways	Following station
Khairabad Kund towards Peshawar Cantonment	Khyber Steam Safari	Terminus

== See also ==
- List of railway stations in Pakistan
- Pakistan Railways
