= Bab-i-Pakistan =

Border crossing between Pakistan and Afghanistan

Bab-i-Pakistan is Pakistan's busiest border gate and crossing terminal with Afghanistan. Pakistan has completed the construction of the border gate, crossing terminal and other associated infrastructure on its side of Torkham border by July 2016. The border gate has been named as Bab-i-Pakistan and the crossing terminal has been named "Shaheed Major Ali Jawad Changezi terminal" after the officer lost his life in skirmishes against the Afghan security forces at the same border and in the clashes that resulted from the construction of this very gate.

The flag hosting ceremony has also started just like the one at Wagah border crossing with India. Now no one will be allowed to cross border without proper documentations to check the infiltration of terrorists from Afghanistan into Pakistan. Work on the construction of the gate and associated facilities began in 2014 but kept getting delayed because of Afghan reservations and abrupt clashes. Pakistan plans to have similar border control measures at all six major crossing points between the two countries on the 2,600 km-long porous border.
