= Rumian railway station =

Railway station in Pakistan

Rumian Railway Station رومیان ریلوے اسٹیشن

General information
- Coordinates: 33.8562°N 72.3031°E
- Owner: Ministry of Railways
- Line: Karachi–Peshawar Railway Line

Other information
- Station code: ROM

Services
Preceding station	Pakistan Railways	Following station
Attock City Junction towards Kiamari	Karachi–Peshawar Line	Attock Khurd towards Peshawar Cantonment
Location

Rumian Railway Station (Urdu and Punjabi: رومیان ریلوے اسٹیشن) is located in Rumian village, Attock district, Punjab province, Pakistan.

== See also ==
- List of railway stations in Pakistan
- Pakistan Railways
