= Bazar Caves =

Cave in Pakistan

Coordinates: 34°16′25″N 71°10′05″E

The Bazar Caves otherwise Bāzār Caves are located in the Khyber in the mountainous Federally Administered Tribal Areas of Pakistan.

== Sources and external links ==
- Detailed map of Bazar Caves and environs
- 3D map
- Pakistan Cave Research Association
