= Akora Khattak railway station =

Railway station in Pakistan

Akora Khattak Railway Station اکوڑا خٹک ریلوے اسٹیشن

General information
- Coordinates: 33.9946°N 72.1471°E
- Owner: Ministry of Railways
- Line: Karachi–Peshawar Railway Line

Other information
- Station code: AKO

Services
Preceding station	Pakistan Railways	Following station
Jehangira Road towards Kiamari	Karachi–Peshawar Line	Hayat Sher Pao Shahid towards Peshawar Cantonment
Location

Akora Khattak Railway Station (Urdu: اکوڑا خٹک ریلوے اسٹیشن, Pashto: د اکوړا خټک اورګاډي سټيشن) is located in the town of Akora Khattak, Nowshera district, Khyber Pakhtunkhwa province, Pakistan. The station code is AKO. It is on the Karachi–Peshawar Railway Line.

== See also ==
- List of railway stations in Pakistan
- Pakistan Railways
