= Hayat Sher Pao Shaheed railway station =

Railway station in Pakistan

Hayat Sher Pao Shaheed Station حیات شیر پاؤ شہید ریلوے اسٹیشن

General information
- Owner: Ministry of Railways
- Line: Karachi–Peshawar Railway Line

Other information
- Station code: HSPS

History
- Opened: 1976

Services
Preceding station	Pakistan Railways	Following station
Akora Khattak towards Kiamari	Karachi–Peshawar Line	Nowshera Junction towards Peshawar Cantonment
Location

Hayat Sher Pao Shaheed Railway Station (Urdu: حیات شیر پاؤ شہید ریلوے اسٹیشن, Pashto: د حیات شیر پاؤ شہید اورګاډي سټيشن) is located in Hayat Sher Pao Shaheed village, Nowshera district of Khyber Pakhtunkhwa province of the Pakistan.

The station is named after Hayat Mohammad Khan Sherpao, a left-wing intellectual, who served as the 15th Governor of North West Frontier Province (now Khyber Pakhtunkhwa province).

== See also ==
- List of railway stations in Pakistan
- Pakistan Railways
- Hayat Sherpao
