= Nasarpur railway station =

Railway station in Pakistan

Coordinates: 34.018834°N 71.678855°E

Nasarpur Railway Station نصرپور ریلوے اسٹیشن

General information
- Owner: Ministry of Railways
- Lines: Karachi–Peshawar Railway Line; Peshawar Circular Railway

Other information
- Station code: NPP

Services
Preceding station	Pakistan Railways	Following station
Taru Jabba towards Kiamari	Karachi–Peshawar Line	Peshawar City towards Peshawar Cantonment
Preceding station	Peshawar Circular Railway	Following station
Peshawar City towards Peshawar Cantonment	(proposed)	Taru Jabba towards Charsadda
Location

Nasarpur Railway Station (Urdu: نصرپور ریلوے اسٹیشن, Pashto: د نصرپور اورګاډي سټيشن) is located in Nasarpur village, Peshawar district in Pakistan's Khyber Pakhtunkhwa province. The station is on the Karachi–Peshawar Railway Line.

== See also ==
- List of railway stations in Pakistan
- Pakistan Railways
