= Khairabad Kund railway station =

Railway station in Pakistan

Coordinates: 33°54′N 72°14′E

Khairabad Kund Railway Station خیرآباد کنڈ ریلوے اسٹیشن

General information
- Owner: Ministry of Railways
- Line: Karachi–Peshawar Railway Line

Other information
- Station code: KBD

Services
Preceding station	Pakistan Railways	Following station
Attock Khurd towards Kiamari	Karachi–Peshawar Line	Jhangira Road towards Peshawar Cantonment
Location

Khairabad Kund Railway Station (Urdu: خیرآباد کنڈ ریلوے اسٹیشن, Pashto: د خیرآباد اورګاډي سټيشن) is located in the village of Khairabad, Nowshera district, Khyber Pakhtunkhwa province, Pakistan. The station is on the Karachi–Peshawar Railway Line.

== Gallery ==
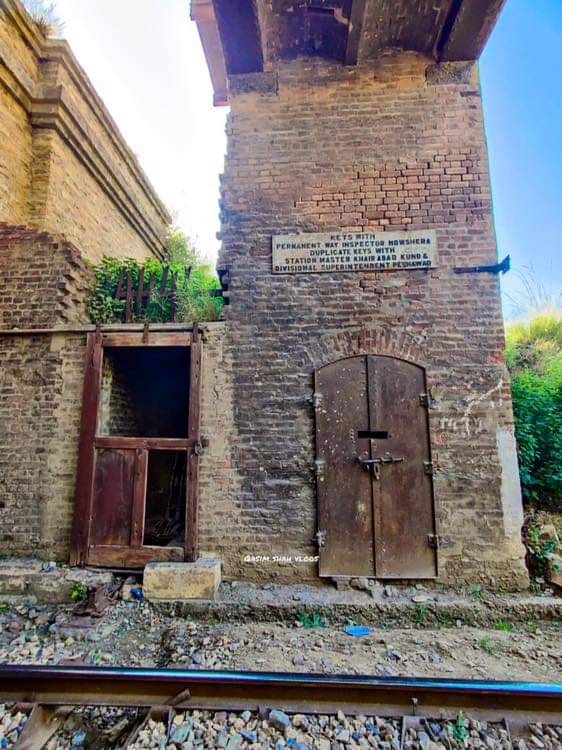
Railway tunnels near Khairabad Kund Railway Station 1

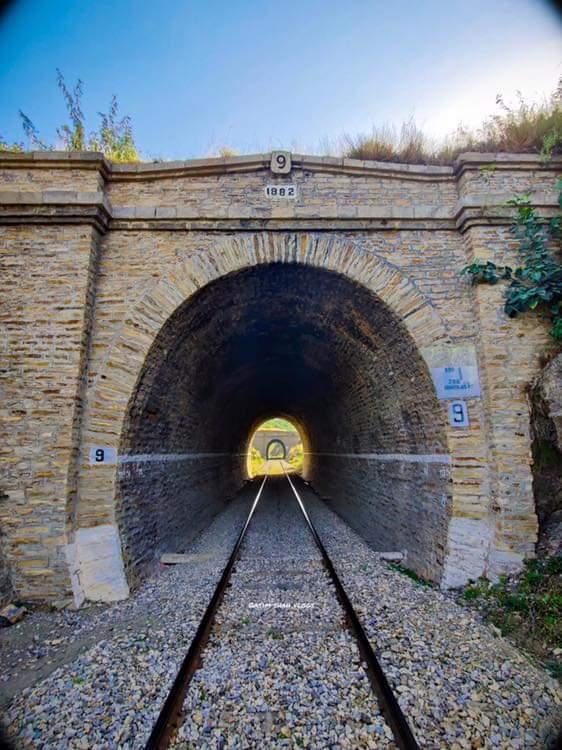
Railway tunnels near Khairabad Kund Railway Station 2

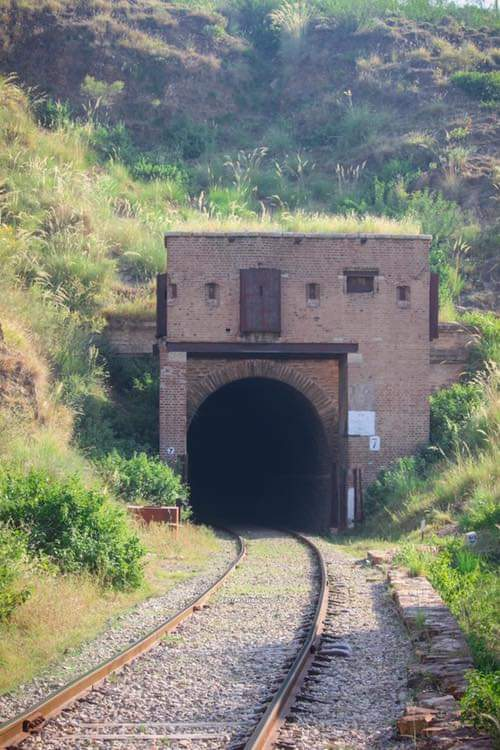
Railway tunnels near Khairabad Kund Railway Station 3

== See also ==
- List of railway stations in Pakistan
- Pakistan Railways
