= Taru Jabba railway station =

Railway station in Pakistan

Taru Jabba Railway Station تارو جبہ ریلوے اسٹیشن

General information
- Coordinates: 34.0171°N 71.7277°E
- Owner: Ministry of Railways
- Line: Karachi–Peshawar Railway Line

Other information
- Station code: TAJ

Services
Preceding station	Pakistan Railways	Following station
Pabbi towards Kiamari	Karachi–Peshawar Line	Nasarpur towards Peshawar Cantonment
Location

Taru Jabba Railway Station (Urdu: تارو جبہ ریلوے اسٹیشن, Pashto: د تارو جبہ اورګاډي سټيشن) is located in Taru Jabba village, Peshawar district in Pakistan's Khyber Pakhtunkhwa province. The station is on the Karachi–Peshawar Railway Line.

== See also ==
- List of railway stations in Pakistan
- Pakistan Railways
