= Landi Kotal =

Landi Kotal لنڈی کوتل لنډي کوتل (لواړګی) Lwargai
- Town
- Interactive map of Landi Kotal
- Location within Khyber Pakhtunkhwa
- Coordinates: 34°6′19″N 71°9′19″E
- Country: Pakistan
- Province: Khyber Pakhtunkhwa
- District: Khyber
- Tehsil: Landi Kotal
- Elevation: 1,072 m (3,517 ft)

Population (2023)
  - Total: 38,065
- Time zone: UTC+5 (PST)
- Calling code: 0924

Landi Kotal (Pashto: لنډي کوتل, Urdu: لنڈی کوتل) or Lwargai (Pashto: لواړګی Lwāṛgai) is a town in the province of Khyber Pakhtunkhwa in Pakistan, and the administrative capital of Khyber District. It was one of the largest towns in the former Federally Administered Tribal Areas, and is located 1,072 metres (3,517 ft) above sea level, on the route across the mountains to the city of Peshawar. Landi Kotal is at the western edge of the Khyber Pass that marks the entrance to the Nangarhar Province of Afghanistan, which is located just 5 kilometres (3 mi) to the west.

Landi Kotal is a tourist destination. It was the terminus railway station of Khyber Pass Railway. A tourist train, the Khyber train safari was run on this railway. However, the train closed down in 2006 after floods washed away the railway track and bridges.

Landi Kotal is the main shopping centre for the Shalmani, Shinwari, Afridi, and Mulagori tribes of Khyber Agency.

== History ==
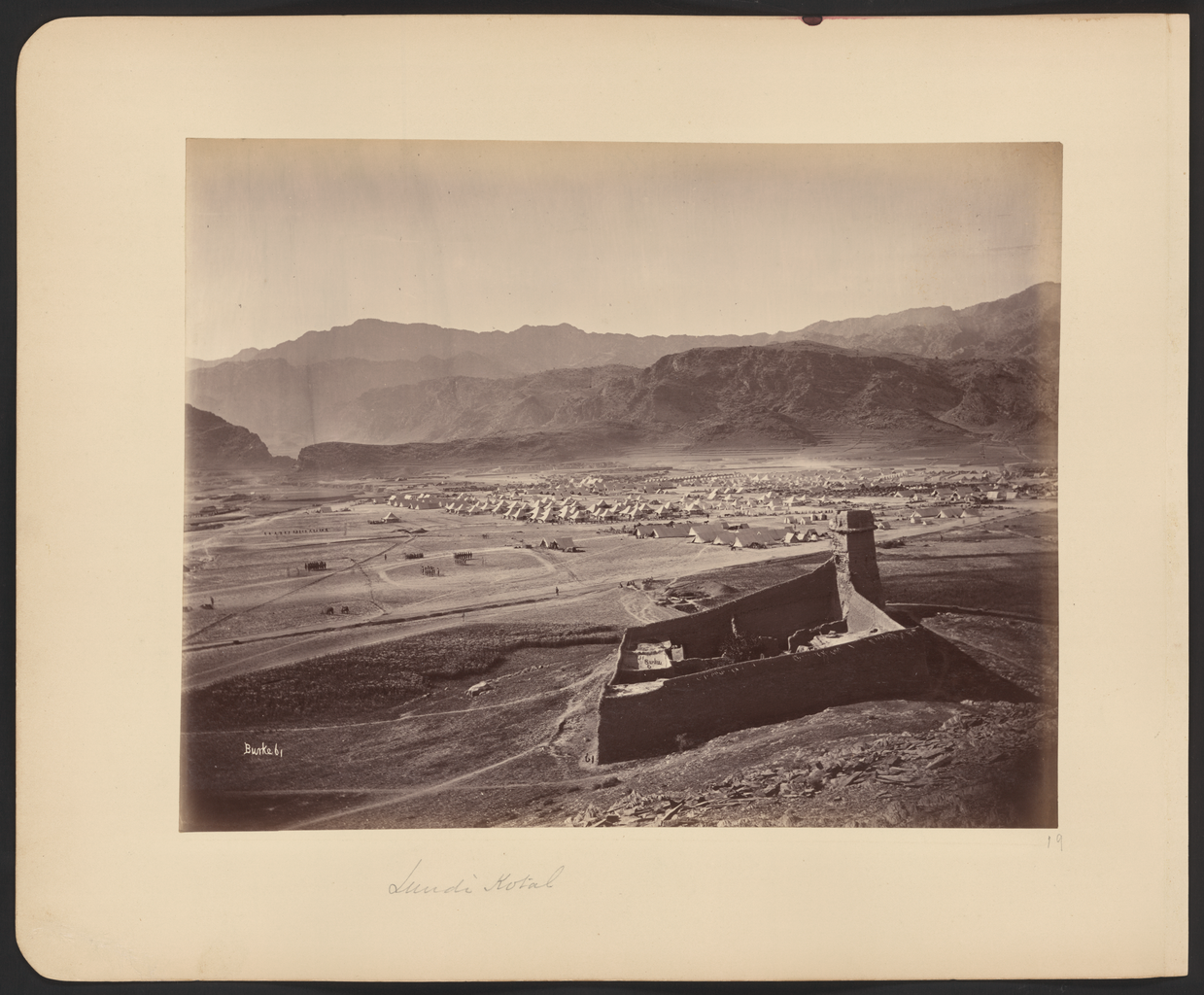
Landi Kotal during the Second Anglo-Afghan War when it served as an encampment of the 12,000-strong Peshawar Valley Field Force under General Sir Samuel Browne who was crossing the Khyber Pass on the way towards Kabul at the start of the war. The small fort in the foreground guards the western end of the Khyber Pass. Photograph by John Burke

Landi Kotal was the westernmost part of the Khyber held by the British during their rule of the Indian subcontinent. In 1897 the Afridis attacked Landi Kotal and other posts in the Khyber Pass. Although the Khyber Rifles put up a stiff defence, Landi Kotal was overrun, as the Rifles lacked water. The British counter-attacked with a force of 34,500 men under Sir William Lockhart, defeating the Afridis, although the Afridis took the town again during the second Anglo-Afghan War.

The Landi Kotal fort during the period of British rule was of the ordinary type, consisting of a keep and an outer fort with accommodation for 5 British officers and 500 native officers and men. From 1899, like the other posts in the Khyber, it had been garrisoned by the Khyber Rifles, an irregular corps of militia recruited from the tribes of the Khyber Agency.

In 1925 the heavily engineered Khyber Pass Railway was opened, linking Jamrud to Landi Kotal.

== Monuments, Landmarks, and Tourist Attractions ==
One such tourist attraction nearby Landi Kotal is the Khyber Pass, a mountain pass connecting Landi Kotal to the Valley of Peshawar. Another, slightly less known landmark is a banyan tree, which was placed under arrest in 1898 by a drunk British officer named James Squid. While Pakistan became independent from the United Kingdom in 1947, there is still a board on the tree notifying passerby of its arrest.

== Demographics ==
=== Population ===
Historical population
Year	Pop.	±% p.a.
1951	...	—
1961	1,695	—
1972	...	—
1981	...	—
1998	22,324	—
2017	33,697	+2.19%
2023	38,065	+2.05%

As of the 2023 census, Landi Kotal had a population of 38,065.

== Notable people ==
- Hamza Shinwari
- Shaheen Afridi
- Usman Khan Shinwari
- Khatir Afridi
- Ayub Afridi

== See also ==
- Khyber Pass Railway
- Landi Khana railway station
- Khyber Pass
- Bazar Caves
- Durand Line
- Afghanistan–Pakistan relations
- Torkham, Pakistan
- N-5 National Highway
- Bara, Khyber Pakhtunkhwa
