= Jamrud =

Jamrud جمرود Jam
- Town
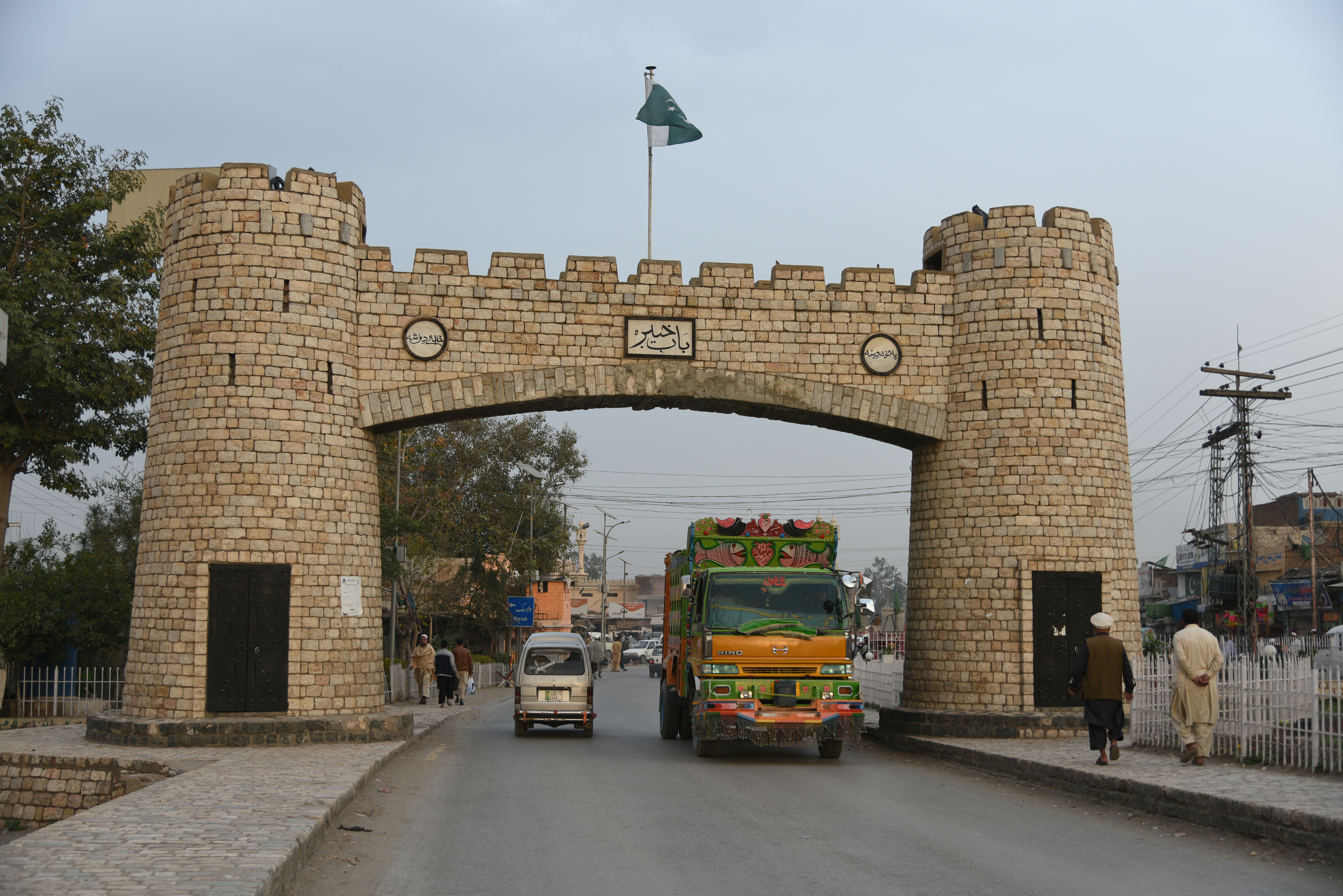
- Bab-e-Khyber in Jamrud town

- Location within Khyber Pakhtunkhwa Location within Pakistan
- Coordinates: 34°00′N 71°23′E
- Country: Pakistan
- Region: Khyber Pakhtunkhwa
- District: Khyber
- Tehsil: Jamrud
- Elevation: 1,512 ft (461 m)

Population (2023)
  - Total: 56,642

Jamrūd (Pashto/Urdu: جمرود) or Jam (Pashto: جم) is a town in the Khyber District of Khyber Pakhtunkhwa, Pakistan. Located in the Valley of Peshawar, on the western fringe of Peshawar city, Jamrud is the doorway to the Khyber Pass which is just to the west of the town. The pass connects Jamrud with Landi Kotal to the west, located near the border of Afghanistan's Nangarhar Province.

Jamrud has remained a location on the trade route between Central Asia and South Asia, and a strategic military location. It is located at an altitude of 461 metres (1,512 ft) above sea level. The Jamrud Fort is located 17 km (11 mi) west of the city of Peshawar.

== Jamrud and Warmando Mela ==
=== Jamrud ===
Jamrud is a town and administrative tehsil in the Khyber District of Khyber Pakhtunkhwa, Pakistan. It is located at the eastern entrance of the Khyber Pass, which historically served as a major trade route and strategic military location connecting South Asia with Central Asia.

Jamrud has historically been important due to its strategic location and fort, which guarded the Khyber Pass. The town is part of the larger Peshawar Valley region and is situated near the provincial capital, Peshawar.

The local economy consists mainly of trade, small businesses, agriculture, and labor work. Jamrud also has educational institutions, healthcare facilities, and small markets that serve the nearby villages and rural communities.

=== Warmando Mela ===
Warmando Mela is a locality and village situated in the Jamrud area of Khyber District, Khyber Pakhtunkhwa, Pakistan. It is part of Jamrud Tehsil and is located near the historic Bab-e-Khyber, close to neighboring communities such as Wulo Mela and Gudar.

Warmando Mela is a settled rural area with several small shops that provide daily necessities to the local population. The locality has a boys’ government school for education and a doctor’s clinic that offers basic healthcare services.

The population mainly consists of laborers, businessmen, teachers, and professionals. Some notable local contributors include teachers Tila Jan, Ishfaq Khan, and Sail Khan; businessmen Azeem Khan, Imran Khan, and Sabeel Khan; religious scholars Molana Tariq Khan and Molana Saleem Malak; doctors Kamran Bhader and Abdul Wahab Afridi; computer teacher Aftab Ahmad; and poets Tofeeq Umar and Arshad.

Many of these individuals belong to the well-known family of Baba Bajar of the Koli Khel (Katia Khel) tribe, which is regarded as one of the prominent families in Warmando Mela.

== History ==
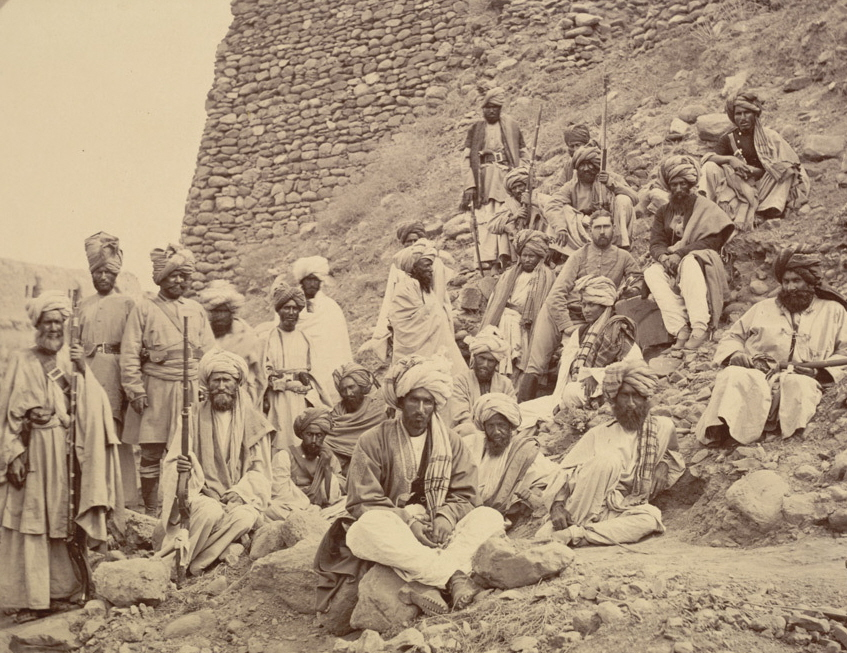
Pashtun chiefs and a British Political Officer posed at Jamrud fort at the mouth of the Khyber Pass in 1878.

The Battle of Jamrud between the Sikh Empire and the Emirate of Kabul took place at Jamrud where the Sikh general Hari Singh Nalwa was killed. The famous Jamrud Fort was built in 54 days by Hari Singh Nalwa. The proposal to build the fort was issued to him by one of his generals. The proposal was opposed; however he finally decided to build the fort and construct its layout. The foundation of the fort that has survived was laid by General Hari Singh Nalwa on 18 December 1836 and the construction was completed in 54 days. The fort was finished on 10 February 1837. Hari Singh Nalwa's grave is still next to the fort where his cremated ashes remain. The fort of Jamrud was captured by the British Empire in 1849 after they annexed the Punjab region and ended the Sikh Empire. The British signed a treaty with Dost Mohammad Khan cementing British rule over the Khyber Pass. Jamrud was a strategic location and served as a base for a cantonment of the British Indian Army during the period of the British Raj. In 1857, the Second Anglo-Afghan Treaty was signed there. It was mainly used by the British army as a base of operations for their wars in Afghanistan. During the military operations of 1878-79 Jamrud became a place of considerable importance as the frontier outpost on British territory towards Afghanistan, and it was also the base of operations for a portion of the Tirah campaign in 1897-1898. It was also the headquarters of the Khyber Rifles, and the collecting station for the Khyber tolls. The place is currently the headquarters of the Frontier Corps, a branch of the Pakistan Army. The population in 1901 was 1,848. In 2017, the population was recorded to be 63,843 and the place continues to be of strategic significance.

== Demographics ==
=== Population ===
Historical population
Year	Pop.	±% p.a.
1951	...	—
1961	...	—
1972	...	—
1981	...	—
1998	32,039	—
2017	63,843	+3.70%
2023	56,642	−1.97%

As of the 2023 census, Jamrud has 8,463 households and a population of 56,642. Jamrud has a sex ratio of 109.72 males to 100 females and a literacy rate of 63.94%: 78.52% for males and 48.03% for females. 17597 (31.14% of the surveyed population) are under 10 years of age.

=== Languages ===
Pashto was the predominant language, spoken by 99.25% of the population.

=== Religion ===
Religions in Jamrud (2023)
Religion	Percent
Islam	99.25%
Christianity	0.74%
Other or not stated	0.01%

== See also ==
- Peshawar
- North West Frontier Province
- Pakistan
- Khyber Pass
