= Charsadda railway station =

Railway station in Pakistan

Charsadda Railway Station چارسدہ ریلوے اسٹیشن

General information
- Coordinates: 34.1508°N 71.7592°E
- Owner: Ministry of Railways
- Line: Peshawar Circular Railway

Other information
- Station code: CSD

History
- Opened: 1954

Services
Preceding station	Peshawar Circular Railway	Following station
Mardan Junction towards Peshawar Cantonment	(proposed)	Peshawar Cantonment towards Nowshera Junction
Location

Charsadda Railway Station (Urdu: چارسدہ ریلوے اسٹیشن, Pashto: د چارسدہ اردوگاه اورګاډي سټيشن) is located in Charsadda, in Khyber Pakhtunkhwa province of, Pakistan. This is the last station on the Mardan–Charsadda Branch Line. It is being proposed to connect the station with Peshawar railway station for the Peshawar Circular Railway.

== See also ==
- List of railway stations in Pakistan
- Pakistan Railways
