= Peshawar City railway station =

Railway station in Peshawar, Pakistan

Peshawar City Railway Station پشاور شہر ریلوے اسٹیشن

General information
- Location: Dalzak Road, Peshawar, Khyber Pakhtunkhwa 25000
- Coordinates: 34.018°N 71.587°E
- Owner: Ministry of Railways
- Lines: Karachi–Peshawar Line; Khyber Pass Railway; Peshawar Circular Railway

Other information
- Station code: PSH

Services
Preceding station	Pakistan Railways	Following station
Nasarpur towards Kiamari	Karachi–Peshawar Line	Peshawar Cantonment Terminus
Terminus	Khyber Pass Railway (defunct)	Peshawar Cantonment towards Landi Khana
Preceding station	Peshawar Circular Railway	Following station
Peshawar Cantonment Terminus	(proposed)	Nasarpur towards Charsadda
Location

Peshawar City Railway Station (Urdu: پشاور شہر ریلوے اسٹیشن, Pashto: د پېښور ښار اورګاډي سټيشن) is one of the two major railway stations in the Peshawar, in Pakistan's Khyber Pakhtunkhwa province. It is located on Dilazak Road.

== Services ==
The station is on the Karachi–Peshawar Railway Line. The following trains originate/stop at Peshawar Cantonment station:

Preceding station	Pakistan Railways	Following station
Nowshera Junction towards Karachi Cantonment	Awam Express	Peshawar Cantonment Terminus
Nowshera Junction towards Karachi City	Khushhal Khan Khattak Express	Peshawar Cantonment Terminus
Rohri Junction towards Karachi Cantonment	Khyber Mail	Peshawar Cantonment Terminus

== See also ==
- Pakistan Railways
- List of railway stations in Pakistan
- Rawalpindi railway station
- Lahore railway station
- Quetta railway station
- Peshawar Cantonment railway station
