= Landi Khana railway station =

Former railway station in Khyber Pakhtunkhwa, Pakistan

Landi Khana Railway Station د لنډي خانې د اورګاډي اډه

General information
- Coordinates: 34.094969°N 71.137466°E
- Line: Khyber Pass Railway

History
- Opened: 23 April 1926
- Closed: 15 November 1932

Services
Preceding station	Pakistan Railways	Following station
Torra Tigga towards Peshawar City	Khyber Pass Railway (defunct)	Terminus
Location
- Location within Khyber Pakhtunkhwa Location within Pakistan

Landi Khana Railway Station (Pashto: د لنډي خانې د اورګاډي اډه; Urdu: لنڈی خانہ ریلوے اسٹیشن) is a disused railway station in Khyber Pakhtunkhwa province of Pakistan. It is located near the Pakistani town of Torkham, on the Pakistan-Afghanistan border. It was established on 23 April 1926 during British rule. The railway connecting the station to nearby Landi Kotal was closed on 15 December 1932, at the request of the Afghan government.

== See also ==
- List of railway stations in Pakistan
- Pakistan Railways

== Notes ==
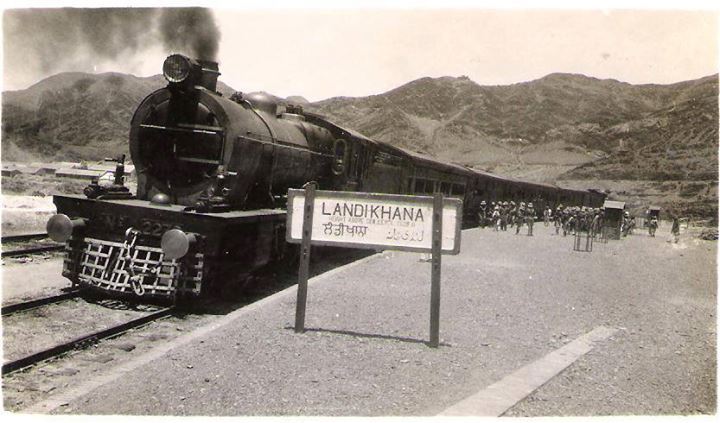
c. 1930-40s: Landi Khana Railway Station.
