= Indian BESA Locomotives =

Series of locomotive classes for British India

The BESA locomotives were a series of standardised steam locomotive designs developed by the British Engineering Standards Association (BESA) (formerly the Engineering Standards Committee) for broad and metre gauge railways in British India. Three reports were issued by the BESA in 1903, 1907, and 1909, during which the locomotive designs of the BESA were outlined and specified. The designs were later superseded by the Indian Railway Standard (IRS) series designs, suited to burn low-quality Indian coal.

== Background ==
At the turn of the 20th century, the British Indian railways experienced an increase of rail traffic alongside exponential expansion, which necessitated an increased need for more motive power from the railways. This affected British locomotive manufacturers who could not keep up with an increased demand for motive power, as British locomotive builders were occupied with fulfilling orders for other railways and could not readily fulfill the growing need for locomotives in British India. Another contributing factor cited as to why British locootive builders could not readily meet the motive power demand was the multiplicity of different locomotive classes which varied in design of the different railways. This led to British Indian railways outsourcing production of locomotives to non-British companies, and complaints arose from British locomotive manufacturers who took issue to the situation.

Amidst this developing situation, a locomotive committee, formed from managers of British locomotive builders was created by the Engineering Standards Committee on request of the British Indian government, representing firms such as Beyer Peacock, Kitson, North British, and Vulcan, which aimed to improve the efficiency of British Indian railway operations through developing standardised locomotive designs for the country's railways.

== History ==
=== Development ===
The first report of the Committee on British Indian railway locomotives was introduced in 1903 (albeit not published until 1905), with an initial compilation of two broad gauge locomotives, an 0-6-0 goods and 4-4-0 passenger, (Note: Generally designated respectively as class SG and SP.) and three metre gauge standard designs, a 4-8-0 goods, and a mixed traffic and passenger, both 4-6-0s. In 1907, the Committee convened again, introducing four more broad gauge locomotives, three tender, which were the 4-4-2 and the 4-6-0 mail engines, the 2-8-0 goods, and one tank locomotive, which was the 2-6-4T passenger. (Note: Generally designated respectively as class AP, HP, HG, and PT.) The 2-8-0 goods was given two design options of differing driving wheel diameters, one with 61 1/2 in driving wheels and one with 56 in driving wheels.

March of 1919 was when the third and final report of the Committee was issued, introducing a metre gauge 2-6-2T locomotive. The design option of the 2-8-0 goods engine with the 61 1/2 in driving wheels had been omitted. The same report provisioned larger boilers from the 2-6-4T tank engines to be used on the 4-4-0 and 0-6-0 locomotives of the first report, alongside vacuum brakes for the locomotives designed by the Committee on both engine and tender, with handbrake operation available on tenders.

The final locomotive designed by the Committee was a 2-8-2T locomotive, (Note: Generally designated class HT.) a late addition to the third report. The locomotive was based on a design built in 1921 for the Bengal Nagpur Railway (BNR), incorporating parts from other Committee-designed locomotives, namely the driving cylinders of the 2-8-0 goods engines (HG) and the boilers of the 2-6-4T tank engines (PT).

The Indian Railway Standards (IRS) designs of 1928 superseded these Committee-design locomotives, with more improved designs, namely increased grate areas tailored to low-quality Indian coal.

=== Service ===
Examples of the broad gauge 4-6-0 mail engine were still in service on Indian railways as late as the 1980s. These engines were considered successful and orders for this design of engines were placed up to around 1950.

== Designs ==
The BESA locomotives originally were designed as saturated steam locomotives, and in 1912 provisions for superheating were drawn up. Locomotives built new with superheating were suffixed with "S" and retrofitted locomotives for superheating were suffixed with "C".

Broad gauge designs
Class (Note: The following class designations were only under government-owned railways, and partially under the EIR.)	Description	Wheel arrangement	Driving wheel diameter	Axle load	Weight	Picture
SP	Standard Passenger	4-4-0	74 in (1800 mm)	16.5 t	92 t	
SG	Standard Goods	0-6-0	61 in (1676 mm)	16.5 t	89 t	
PT	Passenger Tank	2-6-4T	61 in (1676 mm)	15 t	77 t	
HP	Heavy Passenger	4-6-0	74 in (1880 mm)	16.8 t	107 t	
AP	Atlantic Passenger	4-4-2	78 in (1980 mm)	17.5 t	106 t	
HG, 61 ½ in driving wheels (Note: Omitted in the third BESA report, no examples built.)	Heavy Goods	2-8-0	61 ½ in (1560 mm)	16.3 t	119 t	
HG, 56 in driving wheels	Heavy Goods	2-8-0	56 in (1435 mm)	15.7 t	117 t	
HT	Heavy Tank	2-8-2T	51 in (1295 mm)	17.3 t	92 t	

Metre gauge designs
Class (Note: Various classifications were used for the metre-gauge BESA locomotives.)	Description	Wheel arrangement	Drivingwheel diameter	Axle load	Weight	Picture
P	Passenger locomotive	4-6-0	57 in (1450 mm)	8.7 t	34.5 t	
M	Mixed-traffic locomotive	4-6-0	48 in (1220 mm)	8.7 t	33.3 (locomotive)	
G	Goods locomotive	4-8-0	43 in (1090 mm)	8 t	40.6 t (locomotive)	
T	Tank locomotive	2-6-2T	43 in (1090 mm)	9.3 t	43.7 t (locomotive)	

== See also ==
- Locomotives of India
