= Indian locomotive class HG =

Indian steam locomotive class

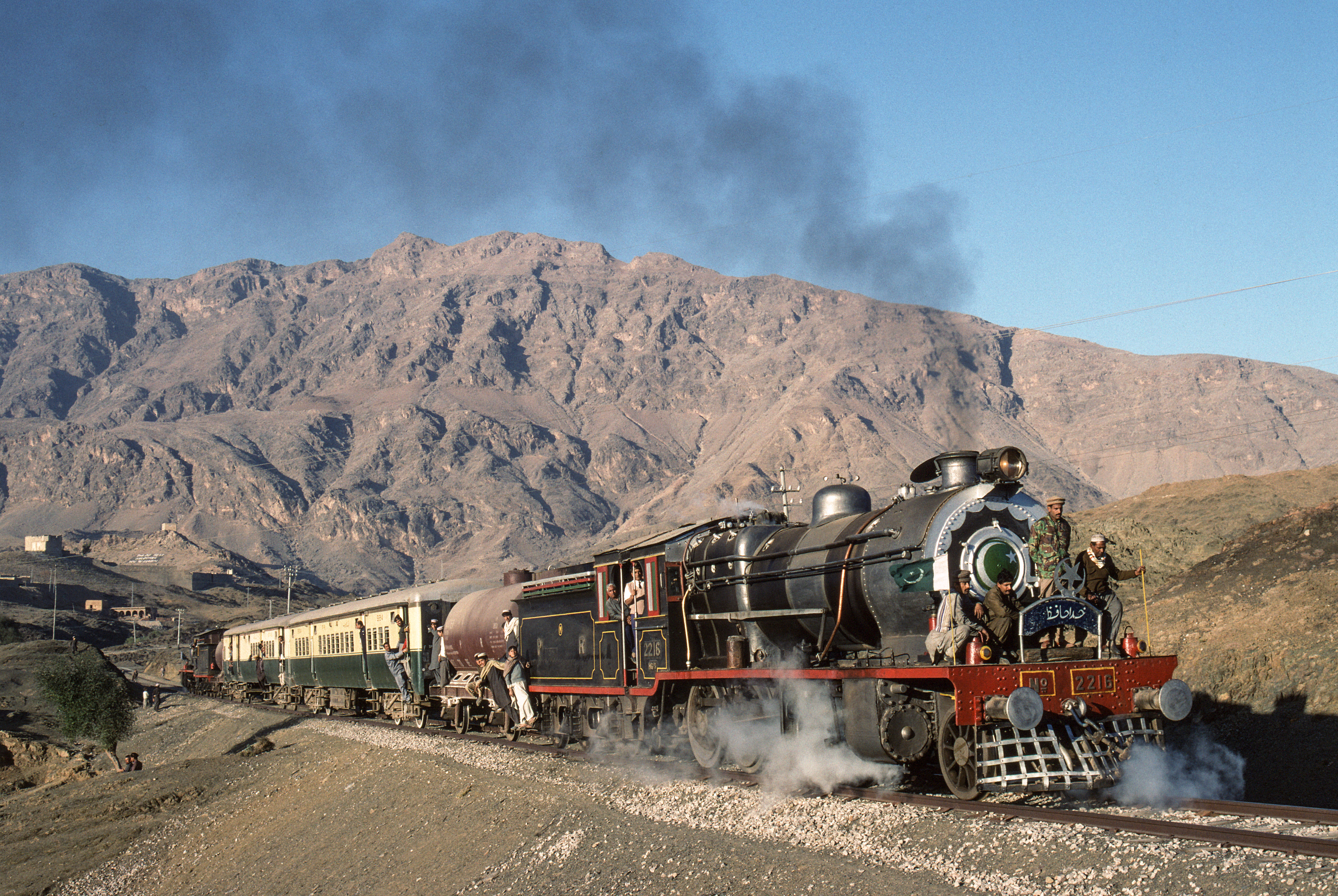
- Pakistan Railways HGS 2216 on the Khyber Pass Railway.
Type and origin
- Power type: Steam
- Designer: British Engineering Standards Association
- Builder: Vulcan Foundry; North British Locomotive Company; Robert Stephenson & Company; Kitson & Company; Beyer, Peacock & Company
- Build date: c. 1907–1924
- Total produced: More than 500
Specifications
- Configuration
  - Whyte: 2-8-0
  - UIC: 1'D n2 (HG class); 1'D h2 (HGS/HGC class)
- Gauge: 1,676 mm (5 ft 6 in)
- Leading dia.: 3 ft 7 in (1,090 mm)
- Driver dia.: Variant with 5 ft 1 1/2 in (1,562 mm) diameter driving wheels: 5 ft 1 1/2 in (1,562 mm); Variant with 4 ft 8 1/2 in (1,435 mm) diameter driving wheels: 4 ft 8 1/2 in (1,435 mm)
- Wheelbase
  - Coupled: Variant with 5 ft 1 1/2 in (1,562 mm) diameter driving wheels: 17 ft (5.2 m); Variant with 4 ft 8 1/2 in (1,435 mm) diameter driving wheels: 16 ft (4.9 m)
  - incl. tender: Variant with 5 ft 1 1/2 in (1,562 mm) diameter driving wheels, 4000 gallon tender: 51 ft 6 7/8 in (15.719 m); Variant with 4 ft 8 1/2 in (1,435 mm) diameter driving wheels, 4000 gallon tender: 50 ft 4 1/2 in (15.354 m)
- Length
  - Over buffers: Variant with 5 ft 1 1/2 in (1,562 mm) diameter driving wheels, 4000 gallon tender: 61 ft 6 1/4 in (18.752 m); Variant with 4 ft 8 1/2 in (1,435 mm) diameter driving wheels, 4000 gallon tender: 60 ft 3 7/8 in (18.386 m)
- Width: 9 ft 6 in (2,900 mm)
- Height: 13 ft 6 in (4,110 mm)
- Axle load: Variant with 5 ft 1 1/2 in (1,562 mm) diameter driving wheels: 16.3 long tons (16.6 t); Variant with 4 ft 8 1/2 in (1,435 mm) diameter driving wheels: 15.7 long tons (16.0 t)
- Fuel type: Coal, later converted to oil-firing
- Fuel capacity: 7.6 LT (7.7 t) of coal (3000/4000 gal tenders); 10.2 LT (10.4 t) of coal (4500 gal tender)
- Water cap.: 3,000 or 4,000 or 4,500 imp gal (14,000 or 18,000 or 20,000 L; 3,600 or 4,800 or 5,400 US gal)
- Firebox
  - Type: Belpaire
  - Grate area: Variant with 5 ft 1 1/2 in (1,562 mm) diameter driving wheels: 35 sq ft (3.3 m^{2}); Variant with 4 ft 8 1/2 in (1,435 mm) diameter driving wheels: 32 sq ft (3.0 m^{2})
- Boiler pressure: 180 psi (12.4 bar; 12.7 kgf/cm^{2})
- Superheater: Schimdt (HGS, HGC)
- Cylinders: Two, outside
- Cylinder size: Variant with 5 ft 1 1/2 in (1,562 mm) diameter driving wheels: 21 in × 26 in (533 mm × 660 mm); Variant with 4 ft 8 1/2 in (1,435 mm) diameter driving wheels: 20 in × 26 in (508 mm × 660 mm)
- Valve gear: Walschaerts
- Valve type: Slide (HG class); Piston (HGS/HGC class)
Performance figures
- Tractive effort: Starting at 11.2 bar boiler pressure: Variant with 5 ft 1 1/2 in (1,562 mm) diameter driving wheels: 146 kN (33,000 lbf); Variant with 4 ft 8 1/2 in (1,435 mm) diameter driving wheels: 134 kN (30,000 lbf)
Career
- Operators: Indian Railways; Pakistan Railways
- Locale: British Raj (until 1947); India (from 1947); Pakistan (from 1947)
- Retired: Up until 2006
- Preserved: 2 (India); 4 (Pakistan)
- Disposition: At least six preserved, remainder scrapped

The Indian locomotive class HG (Heavy Goods) is a 2-8-0 goods traffic steam locomotive introduced in 1907 as one of seven standard locomotive designs developed by the Engineering Standards Committee (later the British Engineering Standards Association (BESA)) for use on British Indian railways. Locomotives of this design were rostered by various British Indian railways, later passing on to Indian Railways and Pakistan Railways after the partition, the latter of which continued using these locomotives into the 21st century to haul the Khyber Steam Safari on the rugged Khyber Pass Railway.

== Background ==
British Indian railways operated numerous steam locomotives built to their own design standards. Around the turn of the century, this strained British locomotive manufacturers who could not keep up with motive power demand for the growing railways. This led to British Indian railways outsourcing production of locomotives to non-British companies, which generated complaints from British locomotive manufacturers.

Amidst this situation, proposals for standardisation of British Indian steam locomotives had been drawn up in the 1870s but never went through; but later, a locomotive standardisation scheme for British Indian railways was finally realised when the Engineering Standards Committee was requested by the British Indian government to develop standard locomotive designs for the British Indian railways, in order to improve efficiency in their operations. Its first report, compiled in 1903, (Note: The Engineering Standards Committee report that first catalogued this locomotive design was compiled in 1903, but was not published until 1905 (British Standards Institution).) outlined plans for British Indian standard locomotive designs, with additional reports issued in 1907 and in 1910.

== History ==
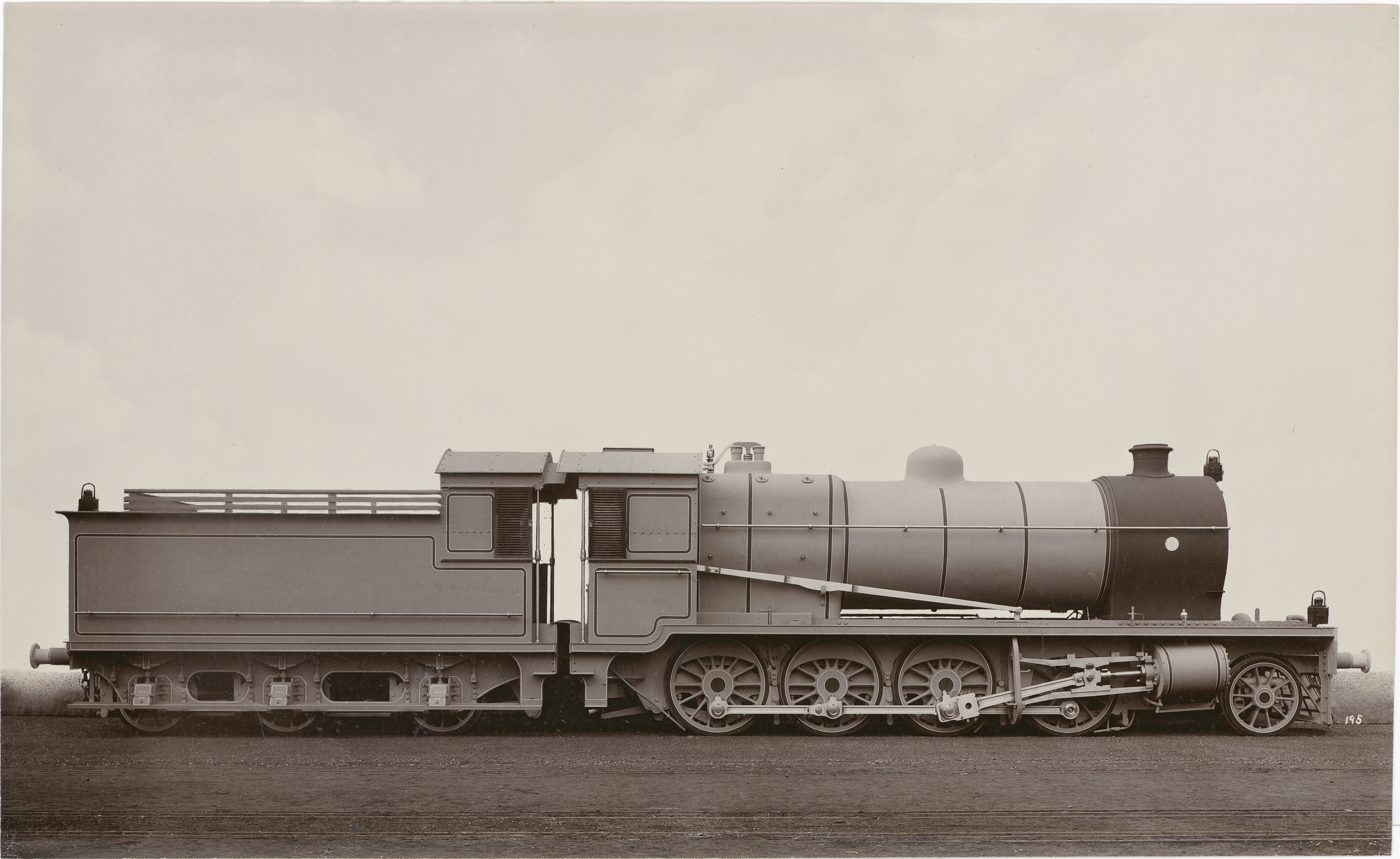
NBL builder's photo of an HG class locomotive

First catalogued by the BESA in their 1907 report on British Indian standard locomotive designs, this goods locomotive design appeared alongside the 4-4-2 and 4-6-0 mail engines and the 2-6-4T tank engine in the same report. In the same report, three different tenders were to be paired with the tender engines, which were two three-axle tenders with a water capacity of 3000 and 4000 gallons, and a 4500 gallon two-bogie tender with two axles for each bogie.

Additionally, the goods locomotive design had two variants: one with 5 ft 1 1/2 in (1,562 mm) diameter driving wheels proposed by the Ministry of Railways, and one with 4 ft 8 1/2 in (1,435 mm) diameter driving wheels, commonplace with several other locomotives already in use on various railways, including the Bengal Nagpur Railway (BNR). However, the variant with the with 5 ft 1 1/2 in (1,562 mm) diameter driving wheels was never manufactured and later was omitted by the BESA in their 1910 report.

From 1912, superheating was provisioned and locomotives of this design fitted new with Schmidt superheaters were designated class HGS. Locomotives later retrofitted with ssuperheaters were designated class HGC. The superheated locomotives gave better performance as compared to their saturated counterparts, as the latter were of British designs unsuited for the climate of the Indian subcontinent, namely due to narrow fireboxes present in these designs.

In 1947, after the British Raj was partitioned, 133 HG class locomotives of the North Western Railway ended up in the hands of Pakistan Railways. Indian Railways, who inherited the remainder, still had 168 HG class locomotives on the Central, Eastern, and South Eastern zones in June 1977, and were likely retired in the 1980s.

Pakistan Railways however, despite steam traction being mostly phased out in Pakistan in the 1990s, retained HGS 2216, 2277, and 2306 for use on the Khyber Pass Railway, where two of them worked top and tail on tourist trains to Landi Kotal, until 2006, when the railway suspended operations after monsoon rains damaged the line.

== Design ==
The locomotives were designed with two cylinders, a Belpaire firebox, and used saturated steam. The grate was arranged between the two coupled wheelsets. The outer cylinders drove the driving wheel. The saturated HGs were fitted with Walschaerts valve gear with slide valves; piston valves were used in the HGS and HGC classes. The running board was positioned low, so splashers had to be fitted above the driving wheels in the heavier version, while the highter version had none. As with the AP class locomotives, the cab running board is positioned to match the height of the tender running board, and the cab running board also arcs up to the locomotive running board.

As with the AP and HP series locomotives, the cab floor curved upwards to the level of the running board. A small cowcatcher was attached to the front buffer beam. The driver's cab was completely enclosed with a half-cab on the tender. The tender was equipped with running boards and handrails along the side walls, which made it possible to reach the train from the locomotive while running.

Heavier variant A with 5 ft 1 1/2 in (1,562 mm) diameter driving wheels

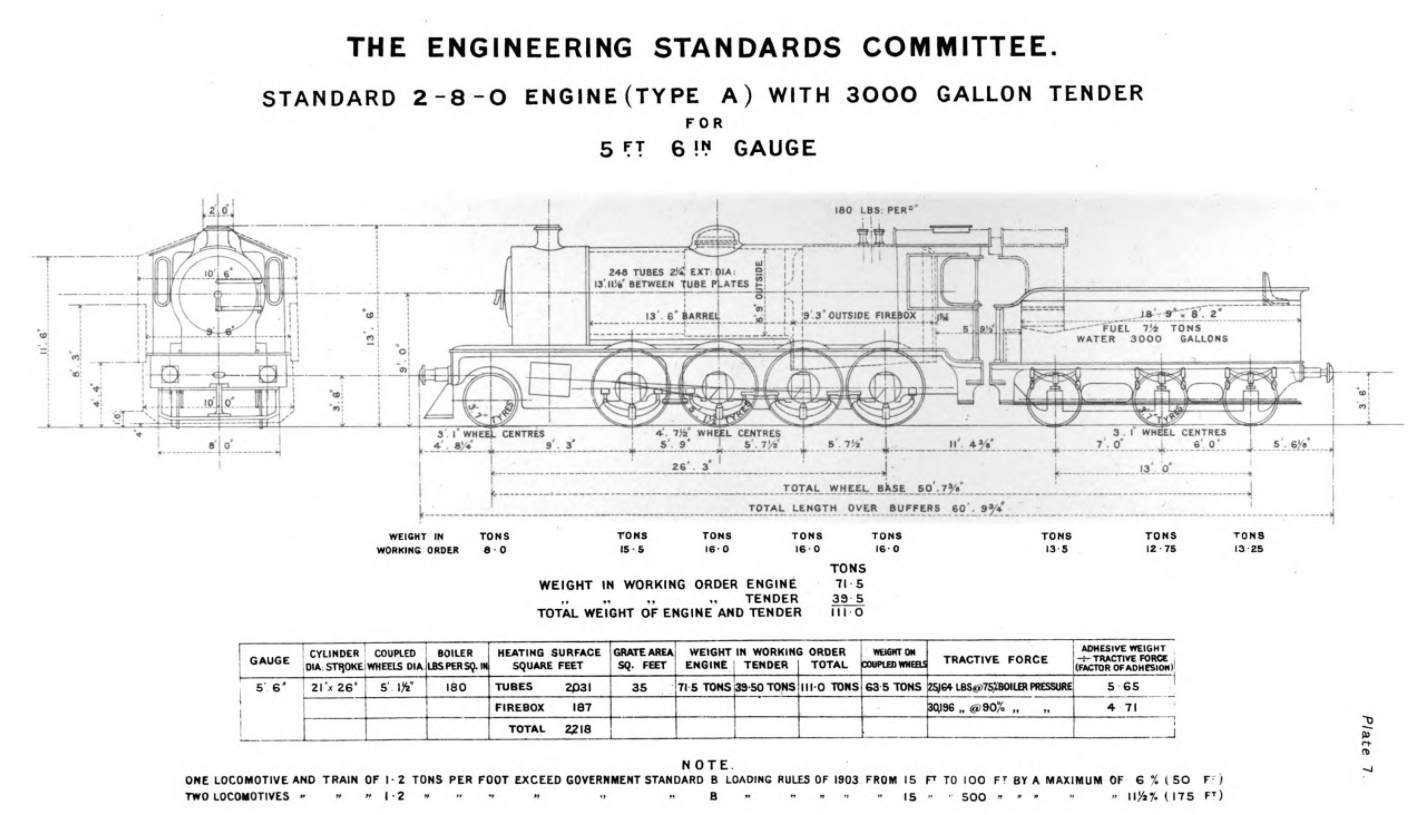
Variant with 3000 gallon tender

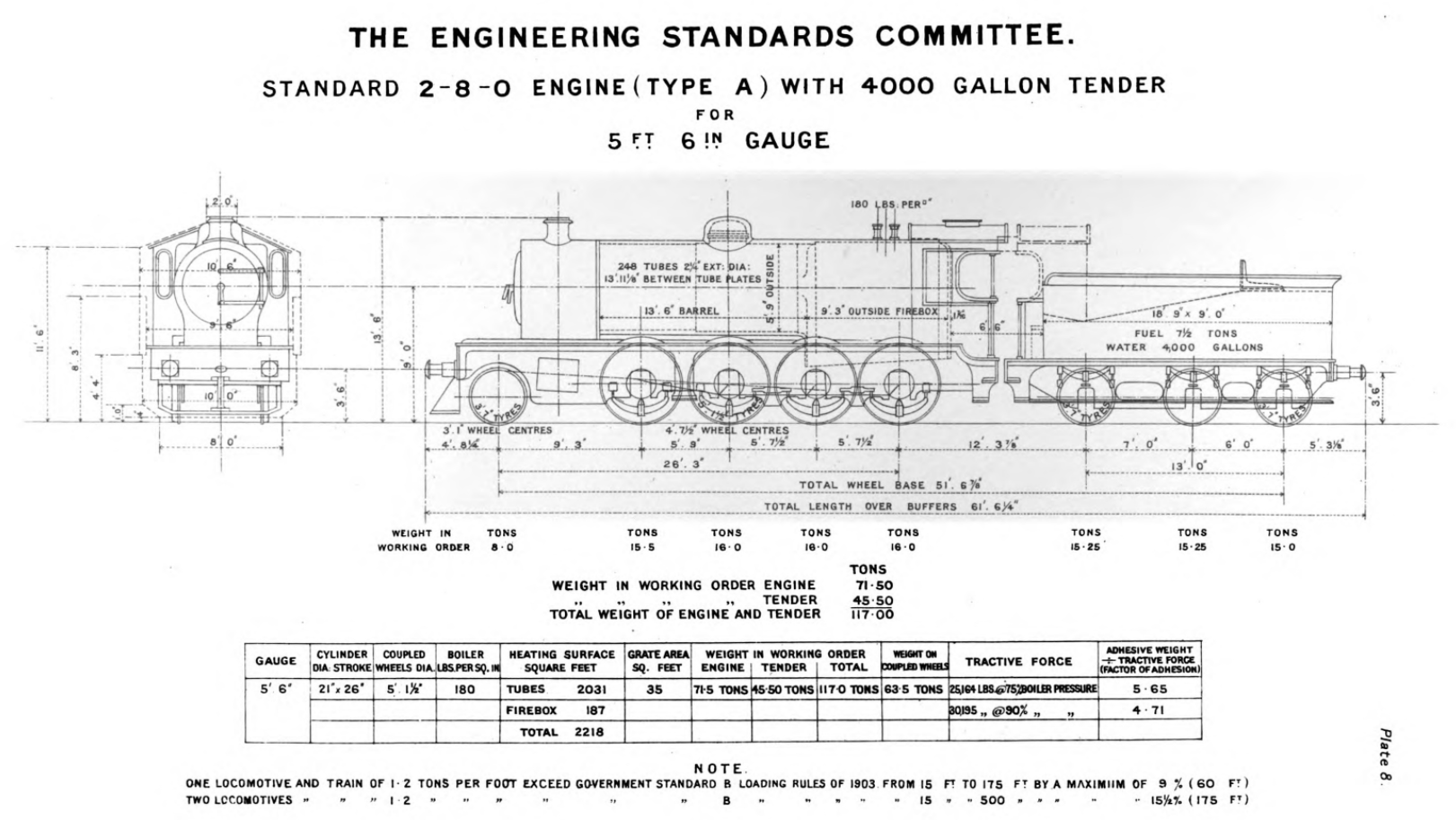
Variant with 4000 gallon tender

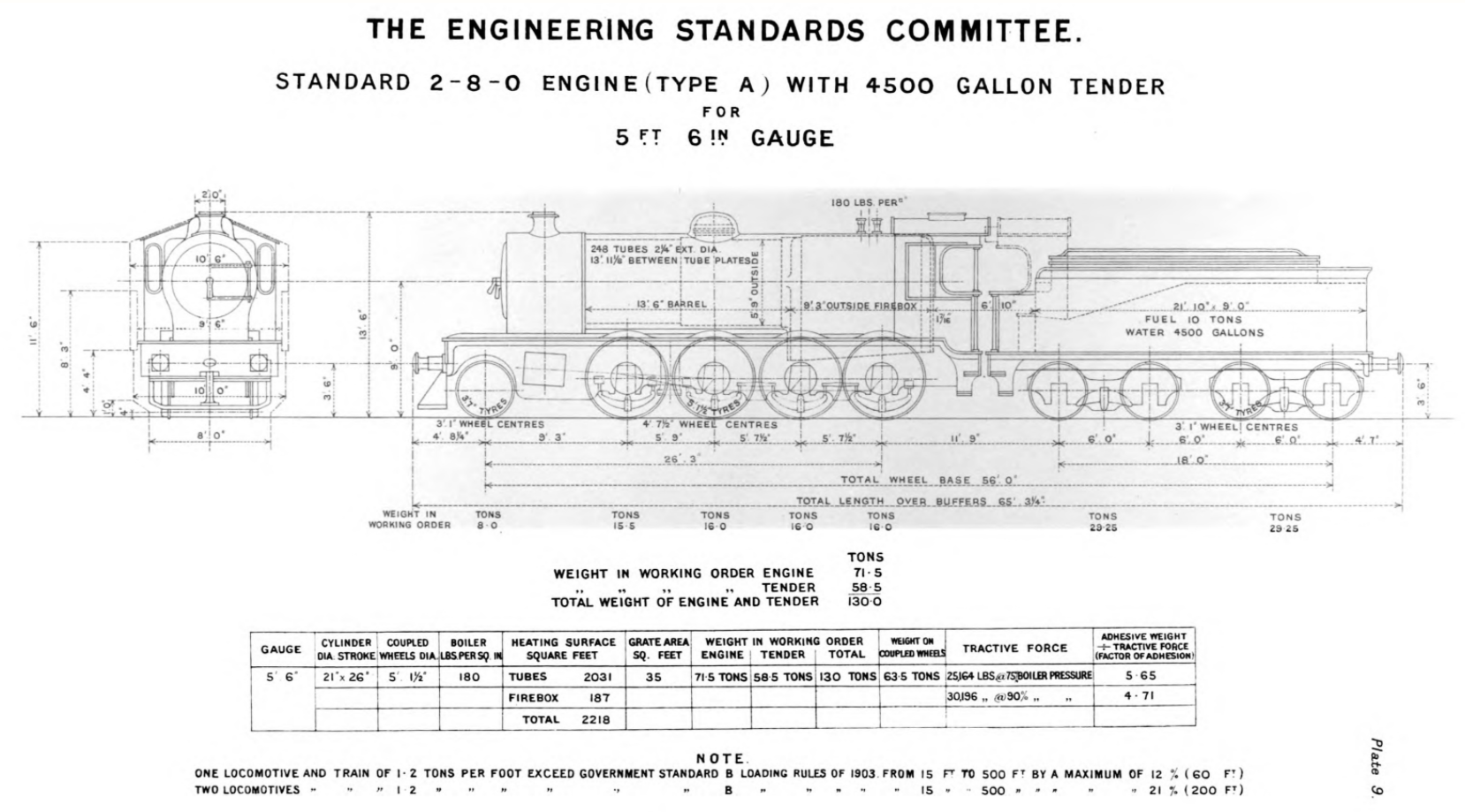
Variant with 4500 gallon tender
Lighter variant A with 4 ft 8 1/2 in (1,435 mm) diameter driving wheels

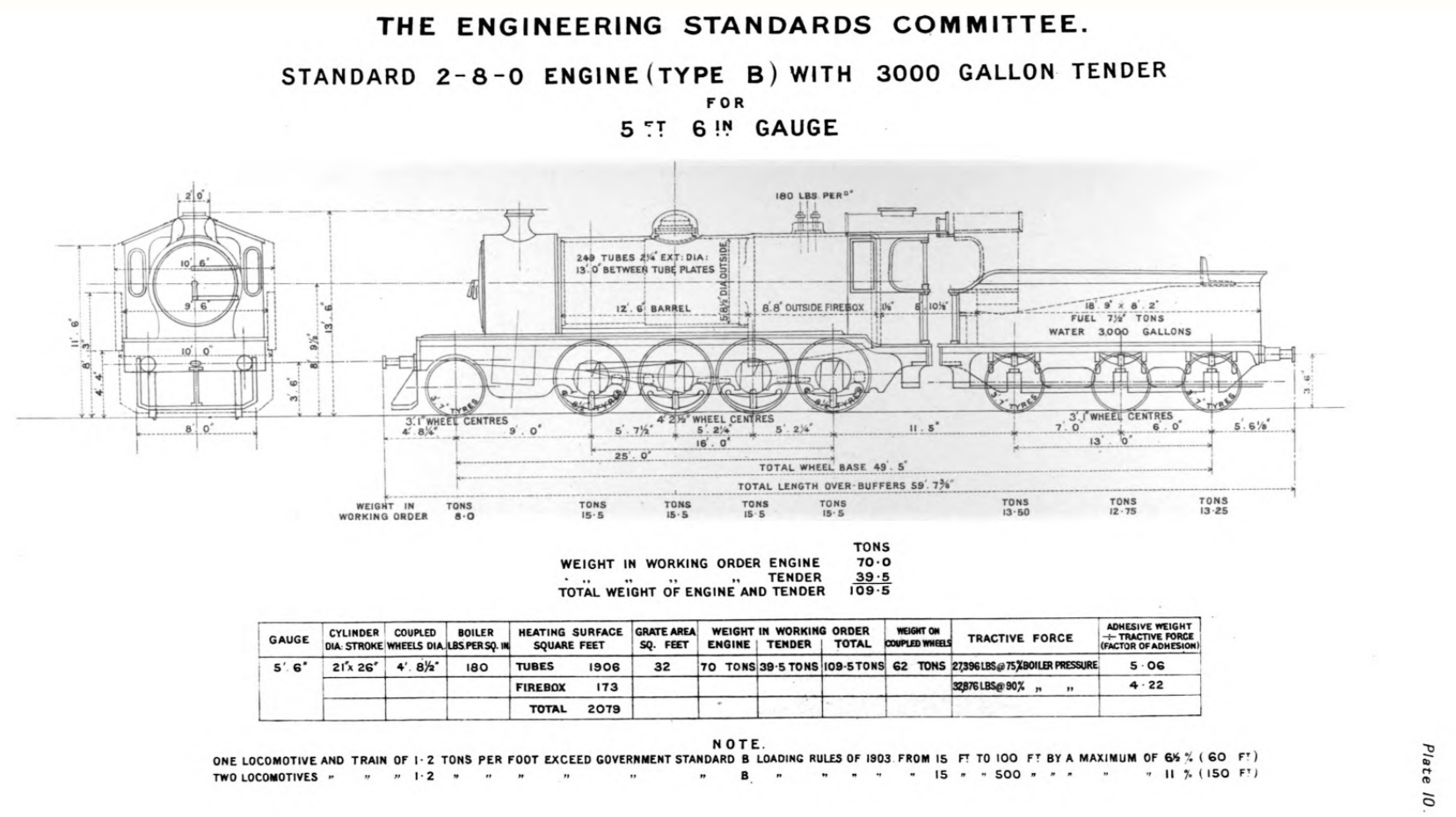
Variant with 3000 gallon tender

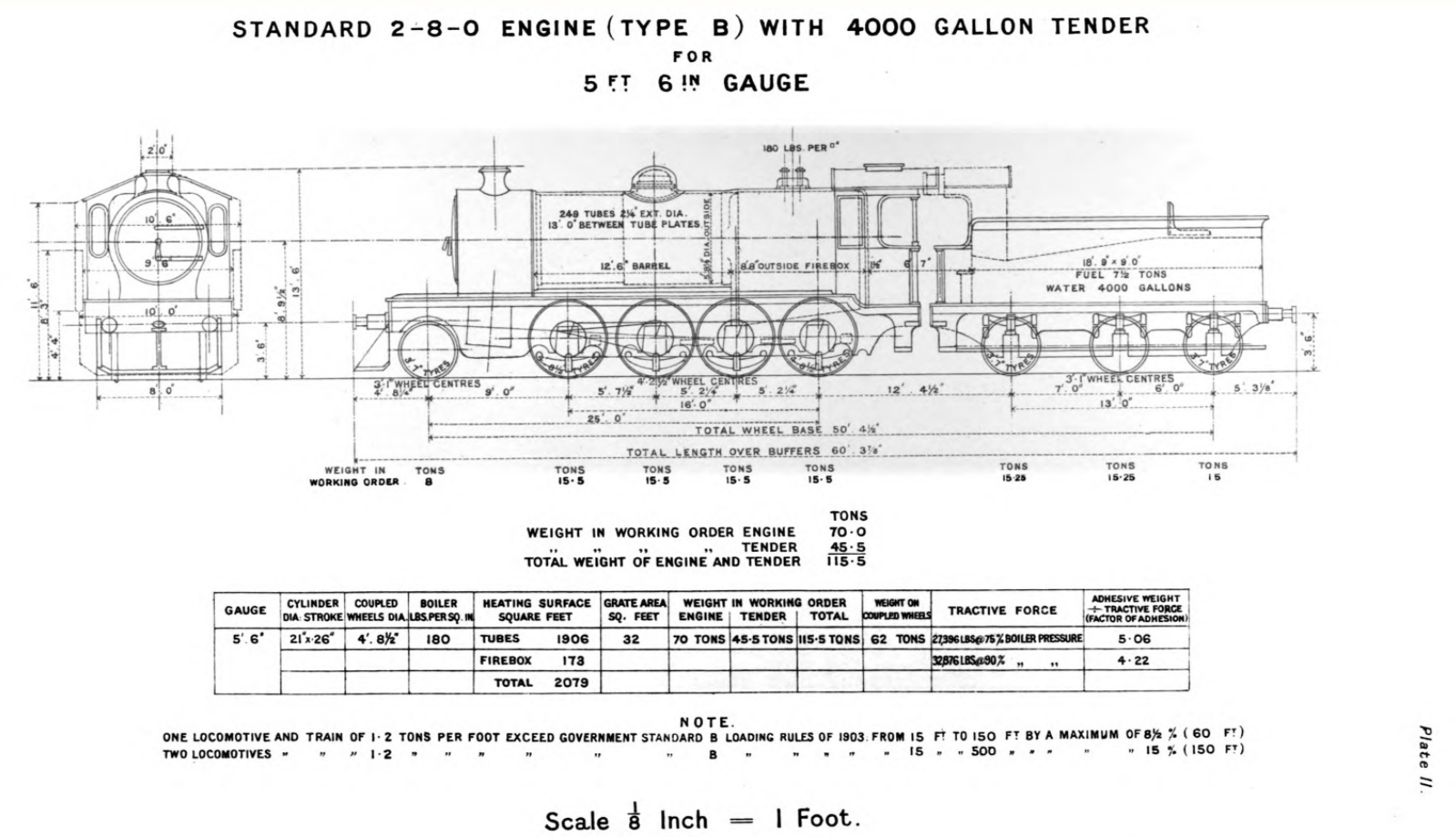
Variant with 4000 gallon tender

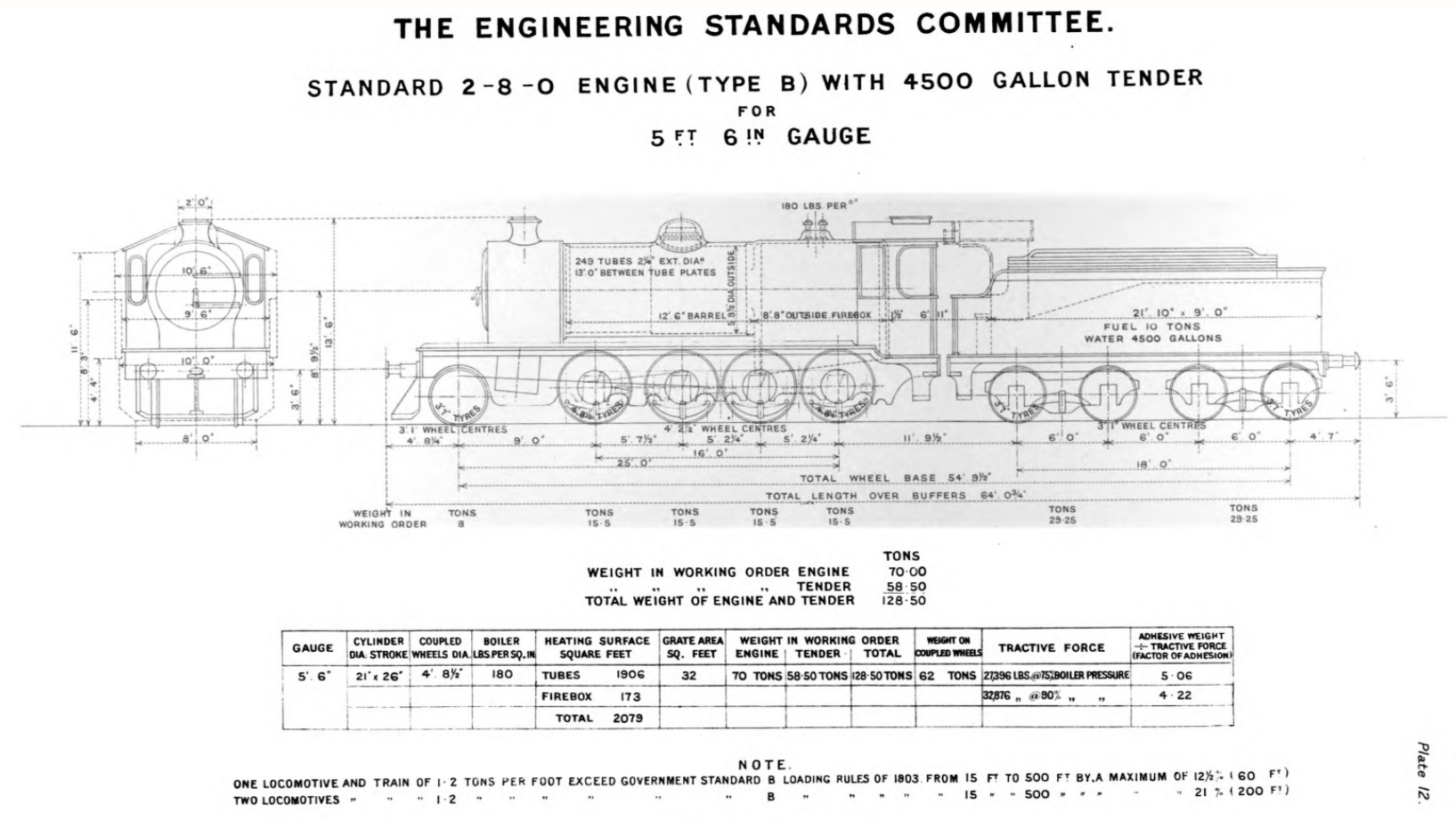
Variant with 4500 gallon tender

== Preservation ==
Two of the Indian HG class locomotives have been preserved:

- HGS 26761 at the Rail Museum, Howrah
- Ex-NWR HGC 1598 (Vulcan no.2461) at the National Rail Museum, New Delhi (Note: Built in 1909 as a HG class, converted in 1929.)

Four of the Pakistani HGS class locomotives are known to have survived, most recently used at a steam event around Attock in April 2020.

== See also ==
- Indian BESA Locomotives
- Khyber Train Safari
- Khyber Pass Railway
- Retirement of steam locomotives by country
- Steam locomotives of the 21st century

== Bibliography ==
- Hughes, Hugh (1979). Steam locomotives in India, Part 3 – Broad Gauge. Harrow, Middlesex: The Continental Railway Circle. ISBN 978-0-9503469-4-6.
