= Indian locomotive class HT =

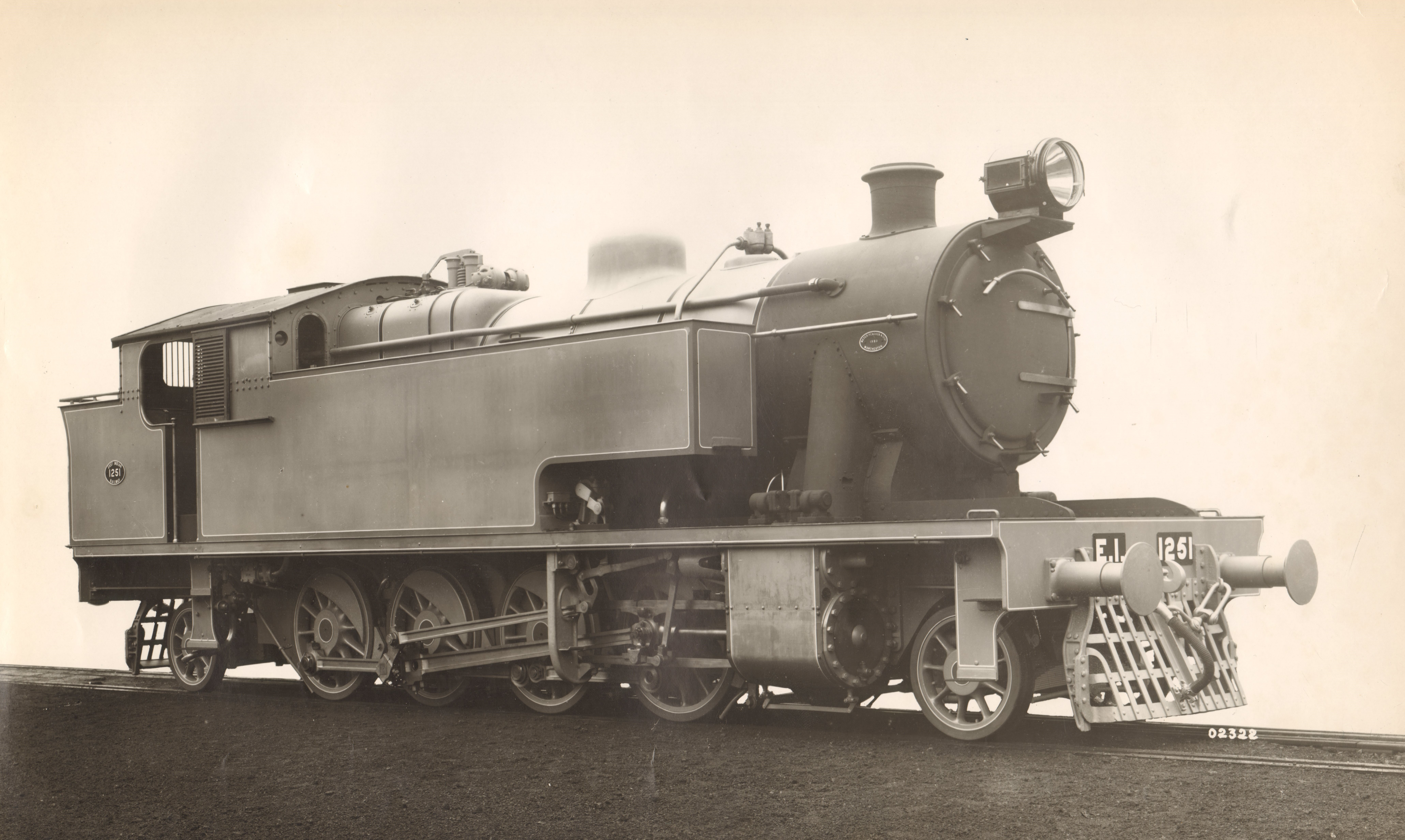
- Works photo of EIR no.1251
Type and origin
- Power type: Steam
- Designer: British Engineering Standards Committee (BESC)
- Builder: Beyer, Peacock & Company; Hawthorn Leslie
- Build date: 1923–1925
- Total produced: 36 (EIR)
Specifications
- Configuration
  - Whyte: 2-8-2T
- Gauge: 1,676 mm (5 ft 6 in)
- Coupled dia.: 4 ft 3 in (1.30 m)
- Length
  - Over buffers: 41 ft 3 1/2 in (12.586 m)
- Axle load: 17.3 long tons (17.6 t)
- Loco weight: 90.5 t (89.1 long tons; 99.8 short tons)
- Firebox
  - Grate area: 27 sq ft (2.5 m^{2})
- Boiler pressure: 180 psi (1,241 kPa)
- Heating surface: 1,567 1/2 sq ft (145.63 m^{2})
- Cylinders: Two, outside
- Cylinder size: 22 in (560 mm) x 26 in (660 mm)
- Valve gear: Walschaerts
- Valve type: Piston
Career
- Operators: East Indian Railway; North Western State Railway; Indian Railways
- Numbers: EIR: 6140-6171 (Beyer Peacock locomotives); 3599-3602 (Hawthorn Leslie locomotives)

The Indian locomotive class HT (Heavy Tank) were a class of 2-8-2T broad-gauge tank locomotives that were one of seven standard broad-gauge locomotive designs developed by the British Engineering Standards Committee (BESC) (later the British Engineering Standards Association (BESA)) for the broad-gauge railways of British India.

== History ==
At the turn of the 20th century, the railways in British India utilised numerous classes of locomotives of differing designs, and there was an urgent need of standardisation: British Indian railways looked to non-British locomotive manufacturers to meet their motive power needs since British locomotive manufacturers could not meet them due to the varying degree of locomotive designs used by British Indian railways, generating complaints from British locomotive manufacturers. This resulted in the establishment of a locomotive subcommittee of the British Engineering Standards Committee (BESC) who developed several standardised designs of locomotives between 1903 (Note: This BESC report was compiled in 1903, but was not published until 1905.) and 1910 in three successive reports, with the HT class being a later addition to the third report of the BESC in 1910. This design was similar to locomotives delivered in 1921 to the Bengal Nagpur Railway (BNR), which were made using parts shared with other BESC designed locomotives. The HT class had the same cylinder dimensions as the HGS/HGC class (HG (Heavy Goods) class locomotives converted to or installed new with superheating) 2-8-0 locomotives, whereas the boiler was shared with the PT class (Passenger Tank) 2-6-4T locomotives.

During the 1920s, Beyer, Peacock & Co. delivered locomotives of this design for the North Western Railway and the East Indian Railway. Some were in active service as of 1978, allocated to Dhanbad and Pathardth sheds of Eastern Railways.

== Design ==
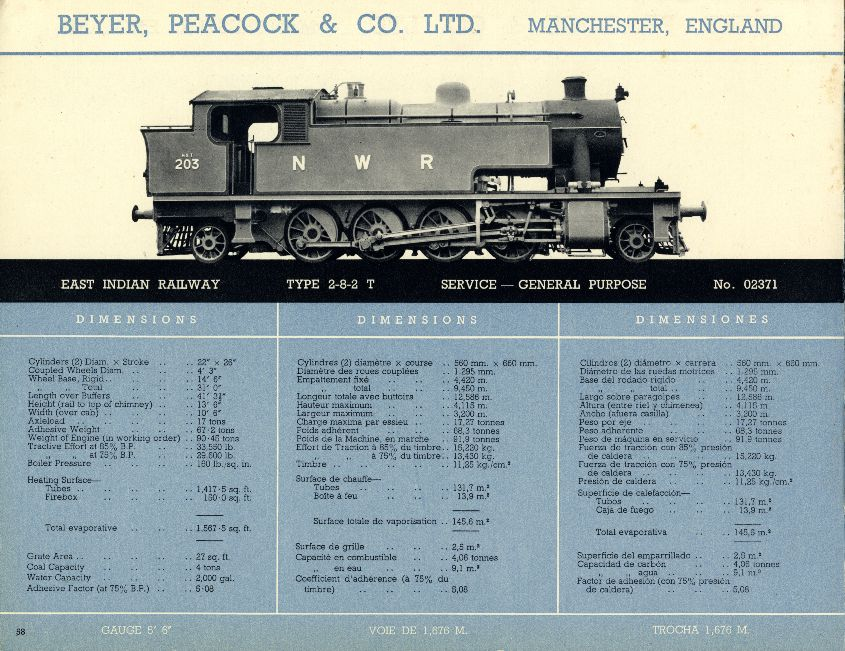
1946 Beyer, Peacock & Company catalogue listing the HT class for the North Western Railway (NWR).

The locomotives were designed with two cylinders, a Belpaire firebox, and used saturated steam. The grate was arranged between the two coupled wheelsets. The outer cylinders drove the driving wheel. An external Heusinger valve gear drove the piston valves. The HT locomotives had the smallest driving wheels of all the broad-gauge BESA locomotives. The laterally mounted water tanks had cutouts above the first driving axle in the lower third. Small cowcatchers were attached to the two buffer beams.

== See also ==
- Indian BESA Locomotives

== Bibliography ==
- Hughes, Hugh (1979). Steam locomotives in India, Part 3 – Broad Gauge. Harrow, Middlesex: Continental Railway Circle. ISBN 9780950346946.
