= Indian locomotive class WCM-5 =

Indian Electric DC Locomotive

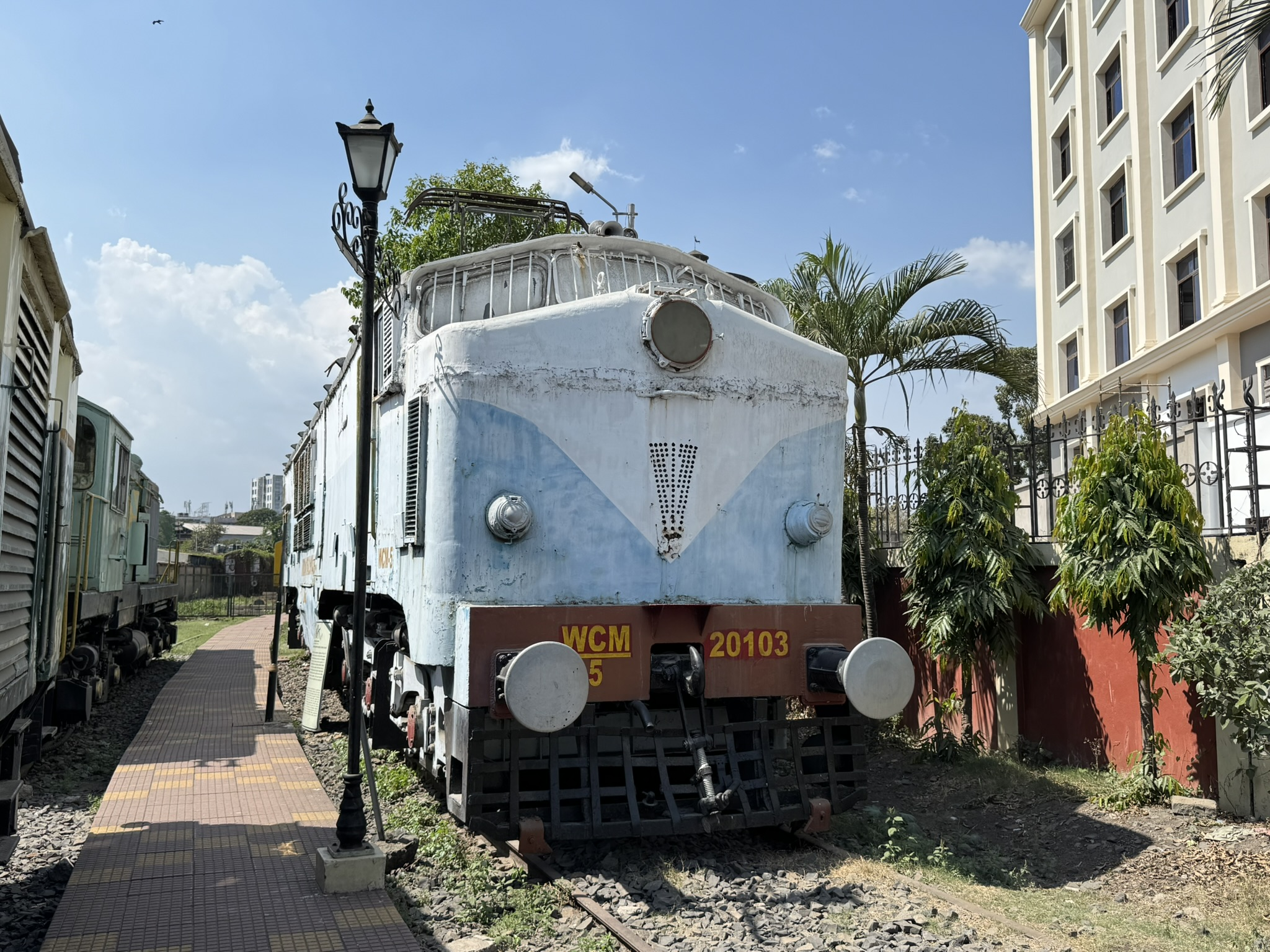
- Preserved 20103 on display at the Howrah Rail Museum
Type and origin
- Power type: Electric
- Designer: CLW
- Builder: CLW
- Build date: 1961–1963
- Total produced: 21
Specifications
- Configuration
  - AAR: C-C
  - UIC: Co′Co′
  - Commonwealth: Co-Co
- Gauge: 5 ft 6 in (1,676 mm)
- Bogies: 3-axle fabricated frame, swing bolster with equalizer beams
- Wheel diameter: New: 1,220 mm (4 ft 0 in), Half worn: 1,182 mm (3 ft 10 1/2 in); Full worn: 1,144 mm (3 ft 9 in)
- Wheelbase: 2,337 mm (7 ft 8 in)
- Length
  - Over couplers: 20.168 m (66 ft 2 in)
  - Over body: 18.898 m (62 ft 0 in)
- Width: 3.200 m (10 ft 6 in)
- Height: 4.293 m (14 ft 1 in)
- Frame type: 3 Axle fabricated frame
- Axle load: 20.30 tonnes (19.98 long tons; 22.38 short tons)
- Loco weight: 124.00 tonnes (122.04 long tons; 136.69 short tons)
- Sandbox cap.: 16 sandboxes each
- Power supply: 110 V DC
- Electric system/s: 1.5 kV DC Overhead
- Current pickup: Pantograph
- Traction motors: HS-373-BR
  - Rating 1 hour: 765A
  - Continuous: 620A
- Gear ratio: 16:59
- Loco brake: Air/Hand, Regenerative braking
- Train brakes: Vacuum
- Compressor: 7kg/cm²
- Safety systems: Slip control, Over voltage relay, No volt relay, Low pressure governor, Vacuum governor Train parting alarms, and Brake cylinder cutoff valve
Performance figures
- Maximum speed: 120 km/h (75 mph)
- Power output
  - Starting: Max: 3,700 hp (2,760 kW)
  - 1 hour: Max: 3,700 hp (2,760 kW)
  - Continuous: Max: 3,170 hp (2,360 kW)
- Tractive effort
  - Starting: 31,000 kgf (300 kN)
  - 1 hour: 21,772 kgf (210 kN)
  - Continuous: 17,690 kgf (170 kN)
- Factor of adh.: 0.25
Career
- Operators: Indian Railways
- Numbers: 20083-20103
- Official name: Lokmanya (for first locomotive)
- Locale: Central Railways
- Delivered: 1960
- First run: 1961
- Last run: January 2000
- Retired: Early 2000s
- Preserved: 1
- Disposition: One preserved, remainder scrapped

The Indian locomotive class WCM-5 is a class of 1.5 kV DC electric locomotives that was developed in 1961 by Chittaranjan Locomotive Works (CLW) for Indian Railways. The model name stands for broad gauge (W), Direct Current (C), Mixed traffic (M) engine, 5th generation (5). The WCM-5 was the first locomotive of any type to be fully developed and built in India, entering service in 1961. A total of 21 WCM-5 locomotives were built at CLW between 1961 and 1963.

The WCM-5 served both passenger and freight trains for nearly 40 years. In 1998, the last WCM-5 locomotive ran with the Indrayani Express. With the introduction of more modern locomotives and 25 KV AC electrification, all were withdrawn in the early 2000s after repeated failures. After withdrawal, one locomotive was put on display at the Kolkata Rail Museum, while the rest of the locomotives have been scrapped.

== History ==
The history of WCM-5 began in the early 1960s with the stated aim of the Indian Railways (IR) to remove the ageing fleet of WCG-1 and WCP-1 class locomotives working on Central Railways (CR). So IR to procure 21 1500 V DC electric locomotives from Chittaranjan Locomotive Works (CLW), who also previously supplied steam locomotives to India during 1954–1955. They were the last "nosed" locomotives of any type to be manufactured.

The WCM-5 locomotives were used on many express trains such as the Deccan Queen, and the Indrayani Express, as well as freight trains. The Deccan Queen had WCM-5 with a matching livery until the 1990s. In the mid-1990s, the ageing WCM-5 began to fail regularly, disrupting train services. So Central Railways decided to withdraw these locomotives from service and by 2000, all units were withdrawn.

== Preserved examples ==
Class	Manufacturer	Loco Number	Previous shed	Name	Livery	Location	ref
WCM-5	Chittaranjan Locomotive Works	20103	Kalyan (KYN)		Cream/Lightblue with red lining	Preserved at Howrah Rail Museum	

== Former sheds ==
- Pune
- Kalyan (KYN)

== See also ==
- Rail transport in India#History
- Indian Railways
- Locomotives of India
- Rail transport in India
