= Rail Museum, Howrah =

Rail Museum in West Bengal, India

Kolkata Rail Museum, Howrah
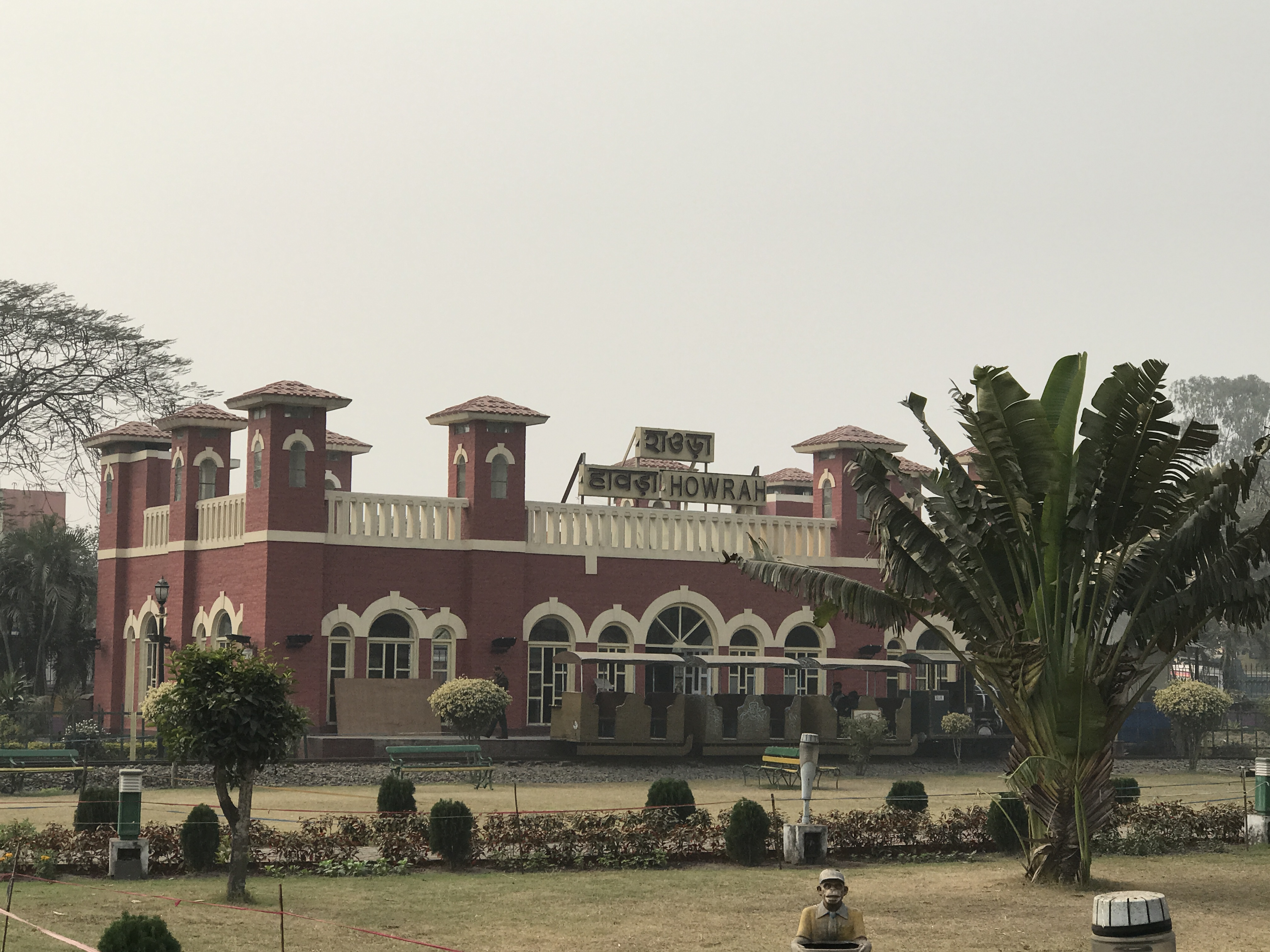
- Established: 7 April 2006; 20 years ago
- Location: Howrah, West Bengal, India
- Coordinates: 22.578°N 88.340°E
- Type: Rail heritage
- Key holdings: Eastern Railway
- Public transit access: Howrah railway station

The Kolkata Rail Museum, Howrah was established in 2006 to display the history and heritage of railways in the eastern part of India with special focus on Howrah railway station.

The collection includes the first broad gauge electric locomotive built in India, a WCM-5; steam locomotive HPS-32 captured during the Indo-Pakistani War of 1971; and the Indraprastha, claimed to be the oldest remaining Indian Railways shunting locomotive.

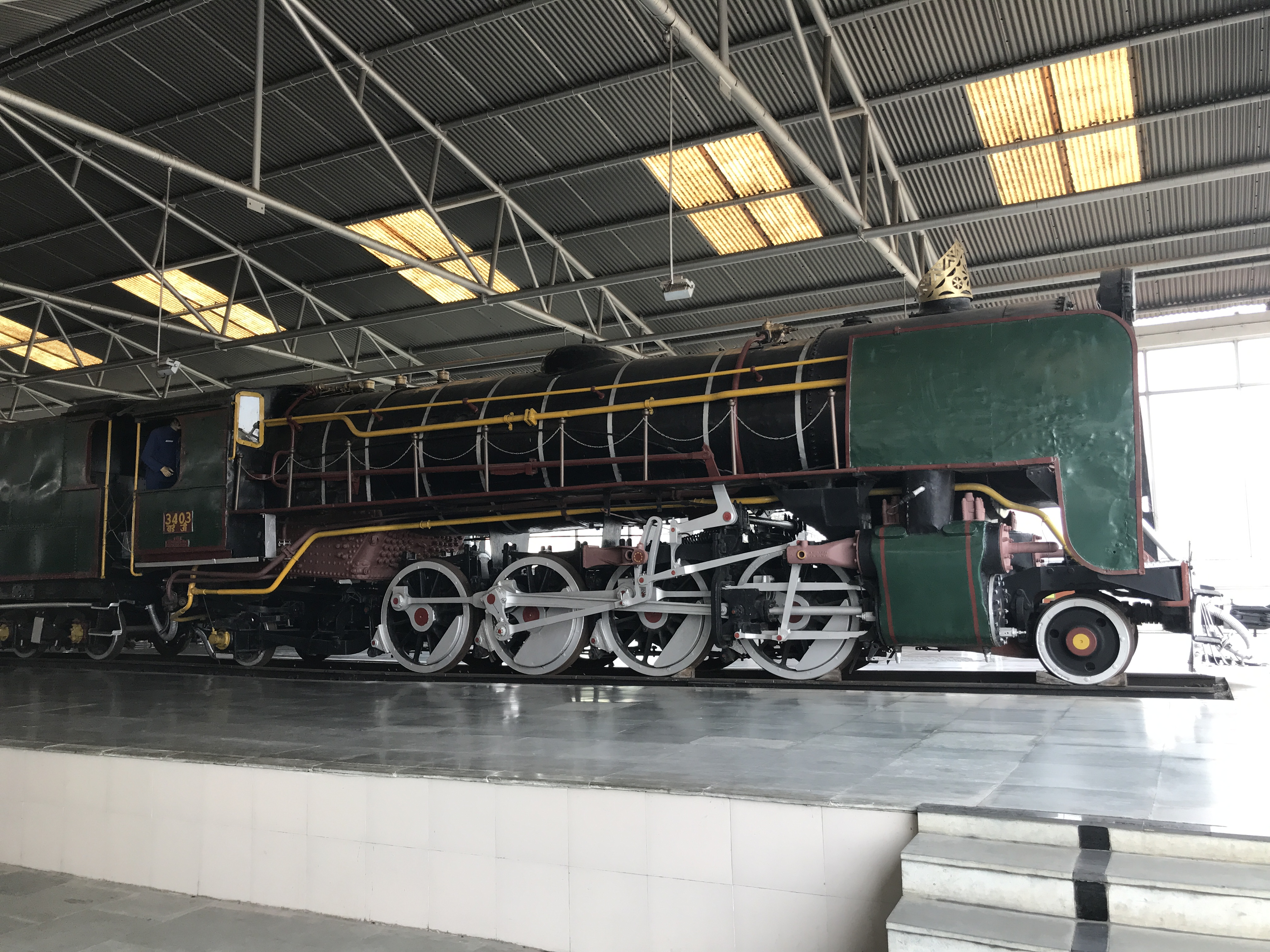
Steam locomotive in semi-covered shed at museum
