= Indian locomotive class HP =

BESA class HP
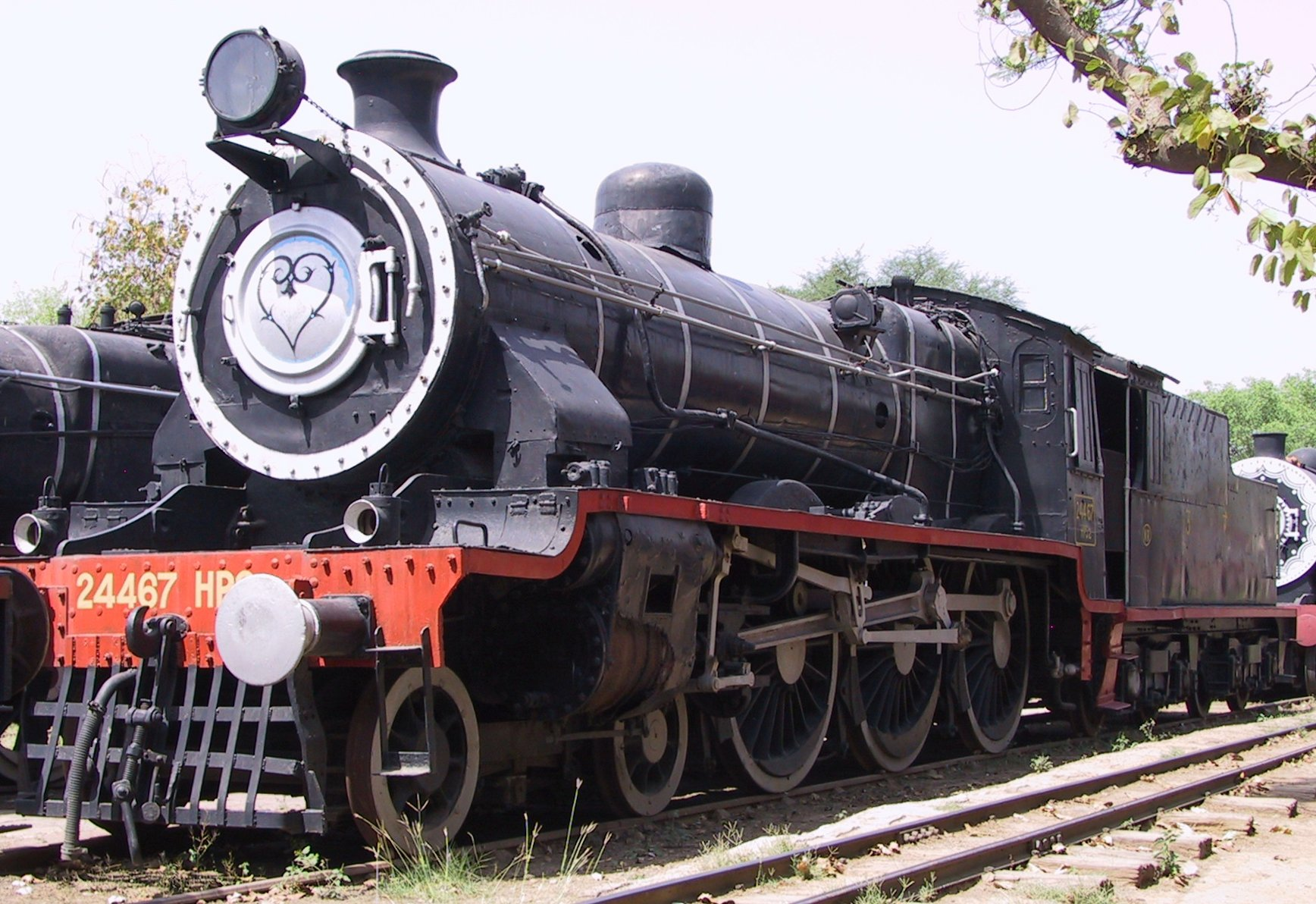
- HPS 24467 on display at the National Rail Museum, New Delhi.
Type and origin
- Power type: Steam
- Designer: British Engineering Standards Association
- Builder: Vulcan Foundry; North British Locomotive Co. Robert Stephenson & Co. Kitson & Co. William Beardmore & Co.
- Build date: 1906–1950
Specifications
- Configuration
  - Whyte: 4-6-0
  - UIC: 2′C n2
- Gauge: 1,676 mm (5 ft 6 in)
- Leading dia.: 3 ft 7 in (1,092 mm)
- Driver dia.: 74 in (1,880 mm)
- Wheelbase
  - Leading: 7 ft 0 in (2,134 mm)
  - Coupled: 6 ft 9 in (2,057 mm)
  - incl. tender: Variant with 3000 gallon tender: 50 ft 7 1 / 2 in (15,430 mm)
- Length
  - Over buffers: Variant with 3000 gallon tender: 60 ft 9 3 / 4 in (18,535 mm)
- Width: 9 ft 6 in (2,896 mm)
- Height: 13 ft 6 in (4,115 mm)
- Axle load: 16.8 long tons (17.1 t)
- Service weight: with 3000 gallon tender: 107 t with 4000 gallon tender: 113 t with 4500 gallon tender: 126 t
- Water cap.: 3,000 or 4,000 or 4,500 imperial gallons (14,000 or 18,000 or 20,000 L; 3,600 or 4,800 or 5,400 US gal)
- Firebox
  - Type: Belpaire
  - Grate area: 32 sq ft (3.0 m^{2})
- Boiler pressure: 180 psi (12.4 bar; 12.7 kgf/cm^{2})
- Heating surface
  - Tubes: 1,880 sq ft (175 m^{2})
  - Total surface: 2,037 sq ft (189.2 m^{2})
- Cylinders: Two, outside
- Cylinder size: 20 in × 26 in (508 mm × 660 mm)
- Valve gear: Walschaerts
- Valve type: Slide (HP class); Piston (HPS/HPC class)
Performance figures
- Tractive effort: Starting: 11.2 bar boiler pressure: 101 kN (23,000 lbf); 9.3 bar boiler pressure: 84 kN (19,000 lbf)
Career
- Operators: East Indian Railway Company; North Western Railway; Eastern Bengal Railway; Great Indian Peninsula Railway
- Locale: British Raj (until 1947); India (from 1947); Pakistan (from 1947); Bangladesh (from 1971)
- Retired: 1980s-early 1990s
- Preserved: 2 (India); 1 (Bangladesh)
- Disposition: Three preserved, remainder scrapped

The Indian locomotive Class HP (Heavy Passenger) was a 4-6-0 broad gauge passenger steam locomotive introduced in 1906 on the railways of British India. It was one of the BESA locomotives developed by the British Engineering Standards Committee, later called the British Engineering Standards Association (BESA).

== History ==
The HP class passenger locomotive was first catalogued in the BESA report on standard locomotive classes for the British Raj of 1907. Like the AP class, the HP was provided with three different tenders: a small one holding 3000 gallons of water, a medium tender holding 4000, and a large tender holding 4500.

The HP class locomotives were delivered to various railways, but only the Indian States Railways (ISR)-operated railways referred to them as the HP class. They were built by several British locomotive manufacturers, including the Vulcan Foundry, Robert Stephenson and Company, North British Locomotive Company, Kitson and Company and William Beardmore and Company.

A later, superheated version was fitted with a Schmidt superheater and classified as HPS (the S means superheated). Retrofitted HPs with superheaters were classified as HPC (the C means converted).

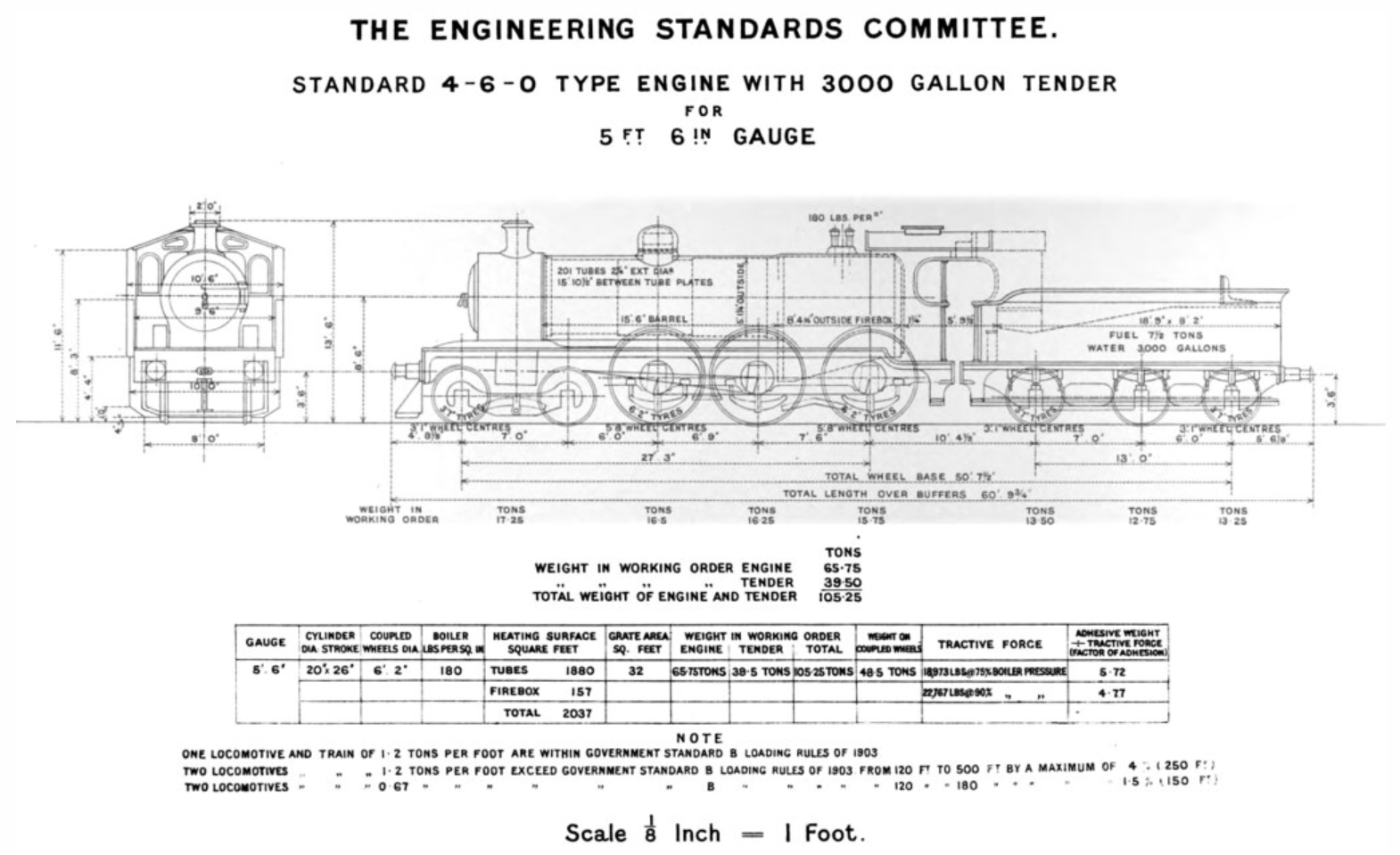
Variant with 3000 gallon tender

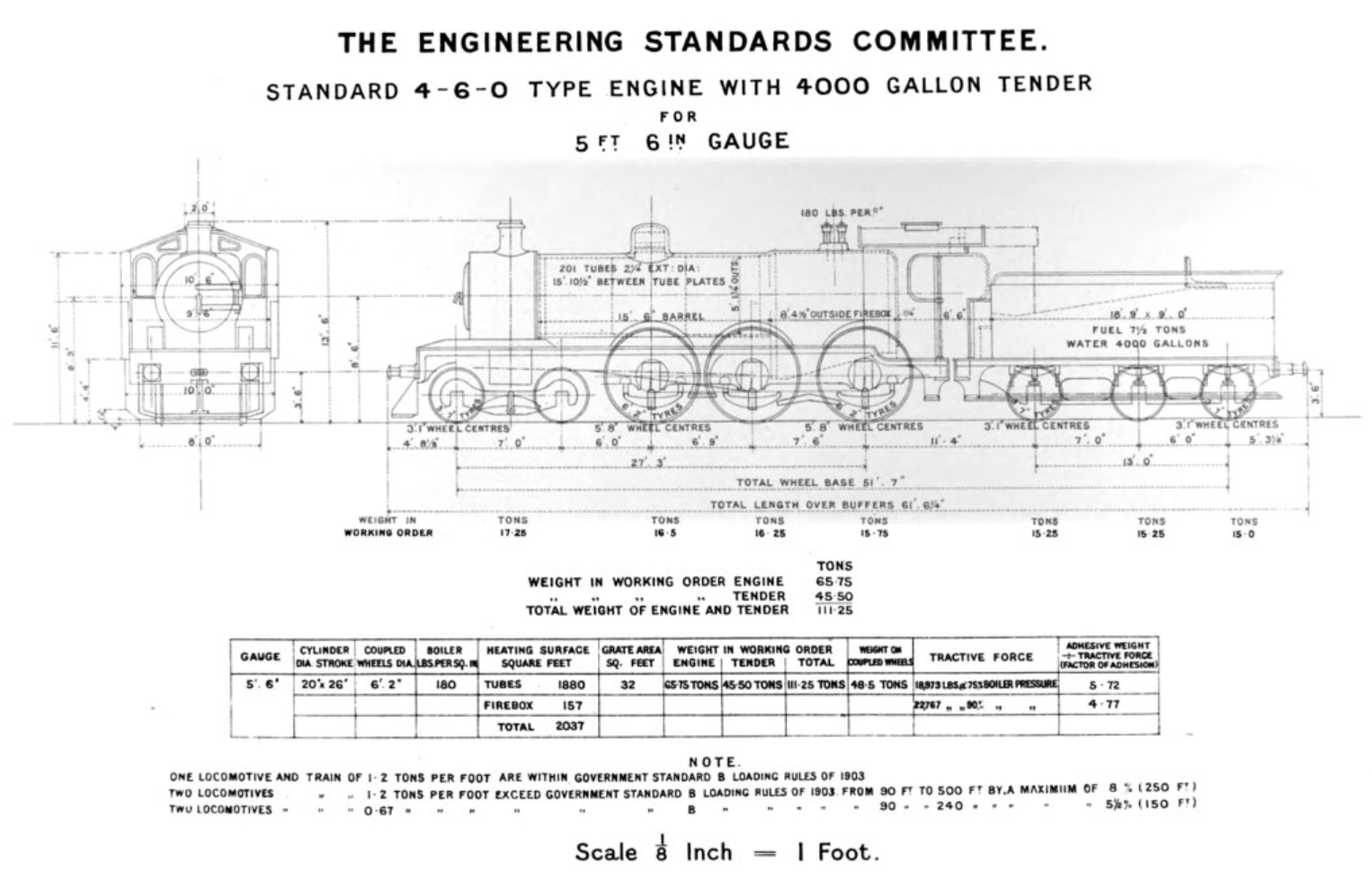
Variant with 4000 gallon tender

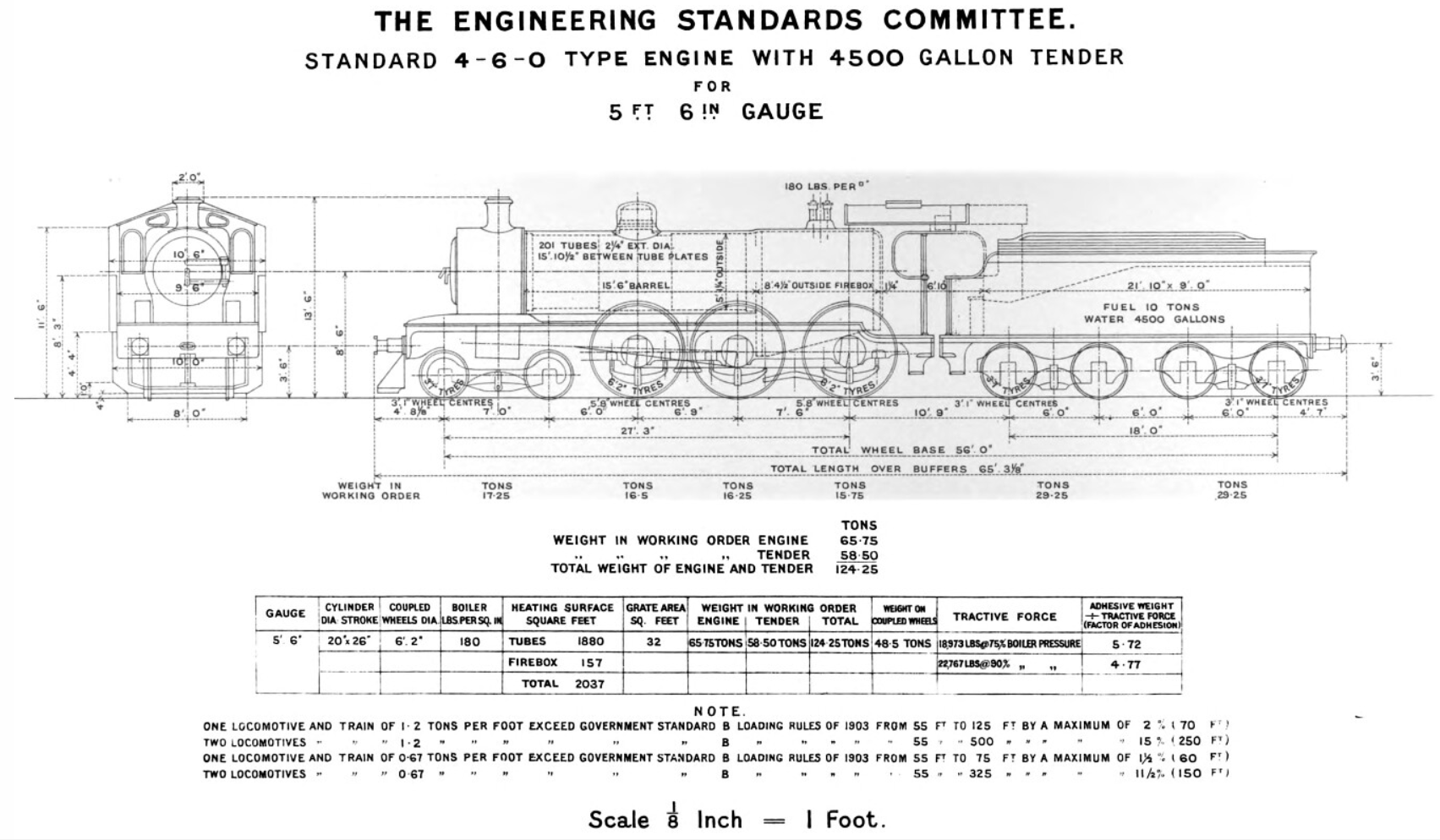
Variant with 4500 gallon tender

== Design ==
The locomotives were designed with two cylinders, a Belpaire firebox, and used saturated steam. The grate was arranged between the two rear coupled wheelsets, which had their wheel base lengths increased to accommodate the grate. The cylinders were fitted on the outside and the motion was driven from the second driving wheel. The saturated HPs were fitted with Walschaerts valve gear with slide valves; piston valves were used in the HPS and HPC classes. The running board was positioned low, so splashers had to be fitted above the driving wheels. As with the AP class locomotives, the cab running board is positioned to match the height of the tender running board, and the cab running board also arcs up to the locomotive running board. A small pilot was attached to the front buffer beam. The driver's cab was completely enclosed with a half-cab on the tender. The tender was equipped with running boards and handrails along the side walls, which made it possible to reach the train from the locomotive while running.

== Preservation ==
Three HPS class locomotives have been preserved:

- Bangladesh Railway HPS 30 in Rajshahi
- Indian Railways HPS 32 at the Rail Museum, Howrah
- Indian Railways HPS 24467 at the National Rail Museum of India, New Delhi.

Working	Class	Number	Location	Built	Zone	Builders	Build No	Name
No	HPS	30	Rajshahi Railway HQ					
No	HPS	32	Regional Rail Museum Howrah		ER			
No	HPS	24467	National Rail Museum	1950	RB	Vulcan Foundry Ltd, Newton Le Willows		

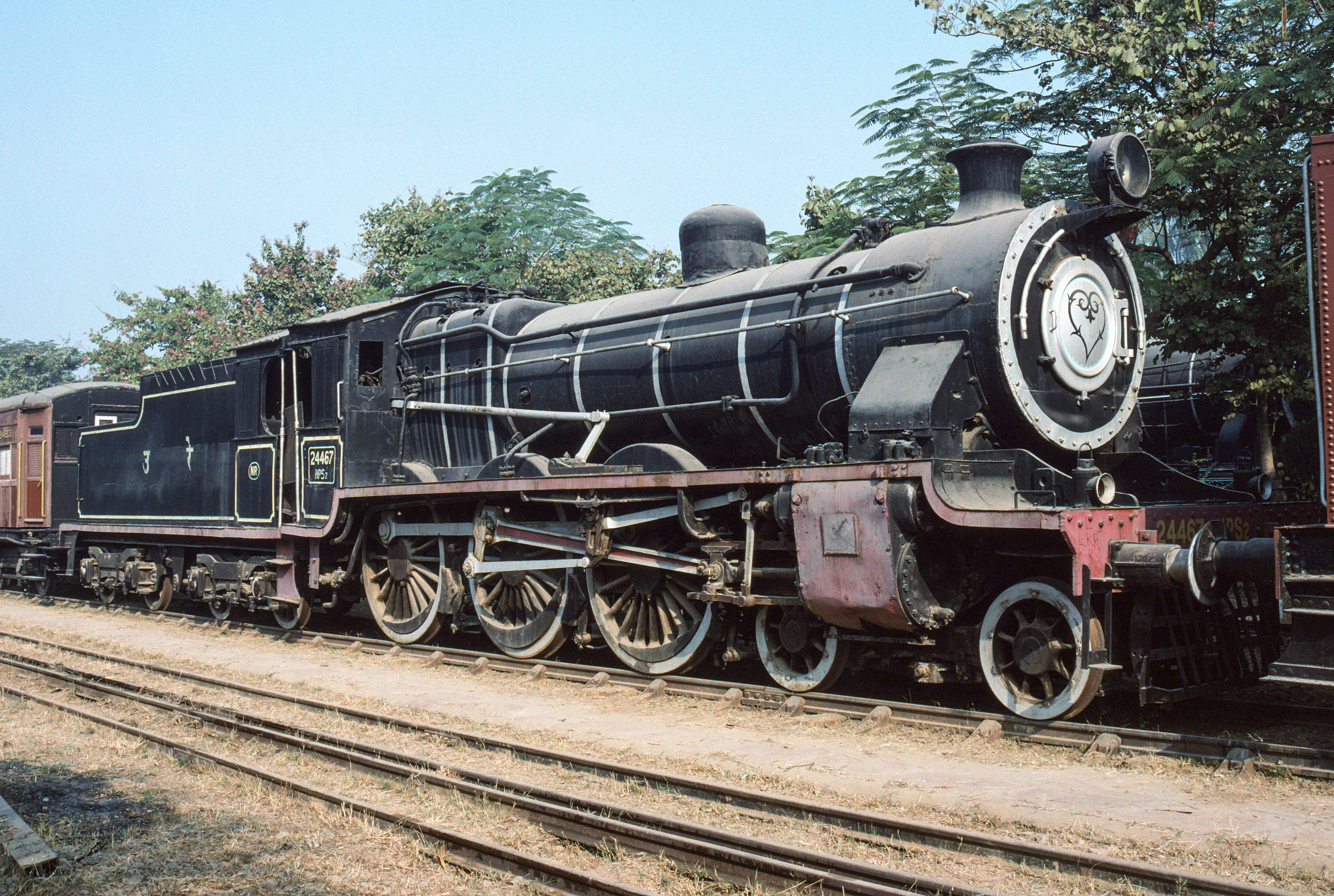
Preserved HPS in the National Rail Museum of India
