= Indian locomotive class AP =

BESA class AP
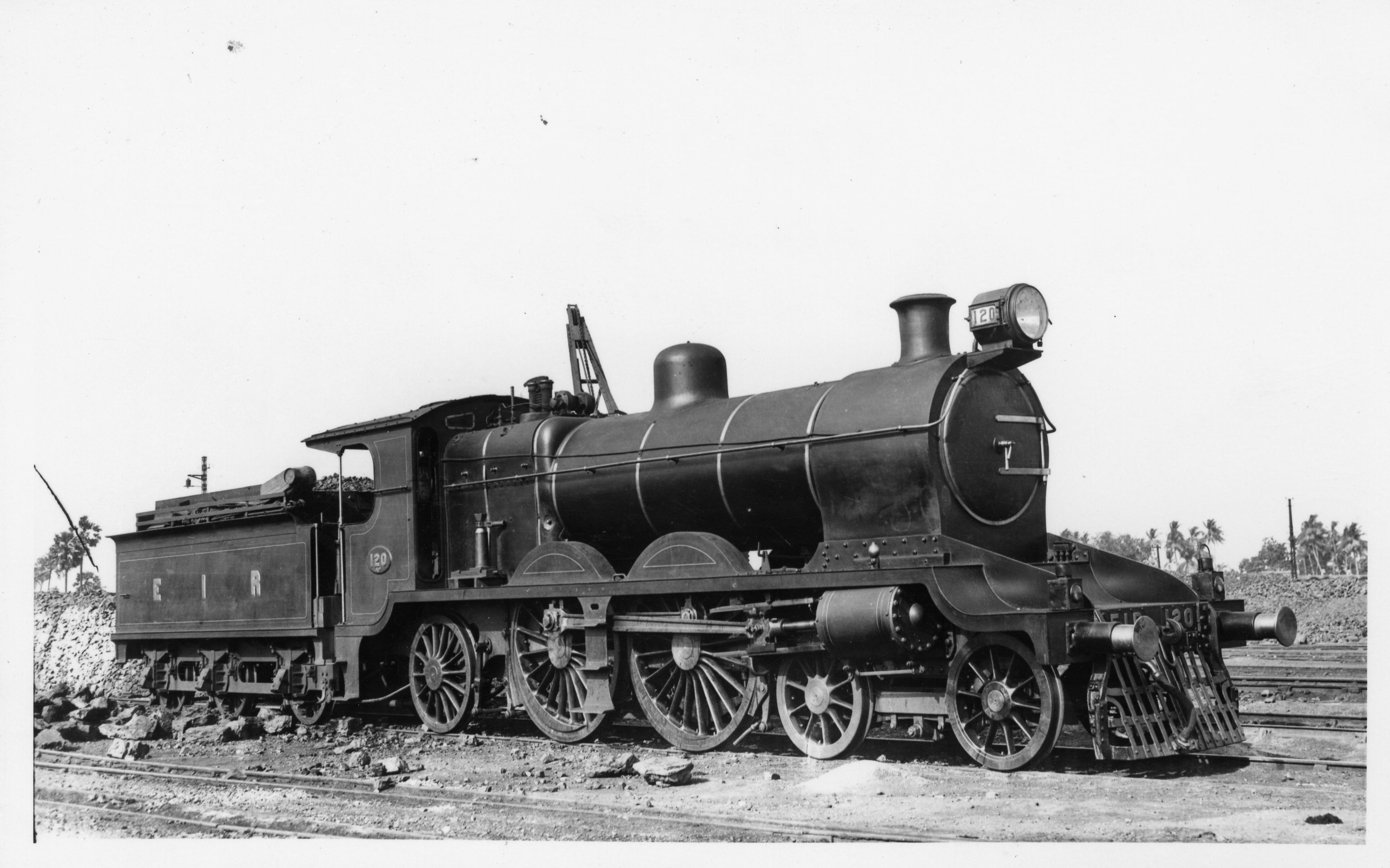
- EIR locomotive No. 120, built by North British Locomotive Company
Type and origin
- Power type: Steam
- Designer: British Engineering Standards Association
- Builder: Vulcan Foundry (28); North British Locomotive Co. (18); Kitson and Company (12)
- Total produced: 58
Specifications
- Configuration
  - Whyte: 4-4-2
  - UIC: 2′B1′ n2
- Gauge: 1,676 mm (5 ft 6 in)
- Leading dia.: 3 ft 7 in (1,092 mm)
- Driver dia.: 6 ft 6 in (1,981 mm)
- Wheelbase
  - Leading: 7 ft 0 in (2,134 mm)
  - Coupled: 6 ft 9 in (2,057 mm)
  - incl. tender: 50 ft 7 1/2 in (15,430 mm) (3000-gal tender)
- Length
  - Over buffers: 60 ft 6 7/8 in (18,463 mm) (3000-gal tender)
- Width: 9 ft 6 in (2,896 mm)
- Height: 13 ft 6 in (4,115 mm)
- Axle load: 17.25 long tons (17.53 t)
- Service weight: 65.00 long tons (66.04 t)
- Tender weight: 39.50 long tons (40.13 t)
- Water cap.: 3,000 or 4,000 or 4,500 imp gal (14,000 or 18,000 or 20,000 L; 3,600 or 4,800 or 5,400 US gal)
- Firebox
  - Grate area: 32 sq ft (3.0 m^{2})
- Boiler pressure: 180 psi (12.4 bar; 12.7 kgf/cm^{2})
- Heating surface
  - Firebox: 1,057 sq ft (98.2 m^{2})
  - Tubes: 1,880 sq ft (175 m^{2})
  - Total surface: 2,037 sq ft (189.2 m^{2})
- Cylinders: Two, outside
- Cylinder size: 19 in × 26 in (483 mm × 660 mm)
Career
- Operators: East Indian Railway Company; North Western Railway; Eastern Bengal Railway

The Indian Locomotive Class AP (Atlantic Passenger) was a broad gauge tender steam locomotive introduced around 1907 for passenger trains on the railways in British India. Its class designation, AP, stands for Atlantic Passenger Locomotive, where Atlantic refers to the wheel arrangement of the same name. It was one of the BESA locomotives developed by the British Engineering Standards Committee, later called the British Engineering Standards Association (BESA).

== History ==
The AP class, designed to haul express passenger trains, was first catalogued in the second edition of the BESA standard from 1907. It could be equipped with three different large tenders - the small one held 3,000, the medium 4,000 and the large 4,500 gallons of water.

Vulcan Foundry delivered a batch of 28 to the East Indian Railway (EIR), whose route network expanded from Calcutta towards the West. These locomotives, built according to British design practice, were used to pull express trains; they were numbered 1300 to 1327, and their works numbers were 2330 to 2357 of 1908.

Ten locomotives were delivered to the EIR by North British Locomotive Company in 1908, and a further 8 in 1909.

The Eastern Bengal Railway received five from Kitson and Company in 1908, and another two in 1909. They were joined in 1930 by five locomotives that had been built by Kitson for the North Western Railway in 1908.

At partition, four of the EBR locomotives went to East Pakistan, and eight to India. Of the 14 remaining EIR locomotives, six went to the Eastern Railway Zone, and the other eight went to the Northern Railway Zone.

== Design ==
The locomotives were designed with two cylinders, a Belpaire firebox, and used saturated steam. The grate was arranged between the coupled wheel sets. Placed outside of the frames were the cylinders, and placed between the frames were the Walschaerts valve gear. A small pilot was fitted to the locomotive's buffer beam. The BESA standard suggested an enclosed cab, with the rear wall of the cab being formed by the tender. However, the locomotives built for the East Indian Railway had tenders without a cab rear wall. The running board was positioned low, so splashers covered the two driving axles. The 3000 and 4000 gallon tenders each had three axles, while the larger 4500 gallon tenders had a pair of two-axle bogies. The two three-axle tender variants had running boards and handrails along the side walls, which made it possible to access the train from the locomotive while it was running. Another peculiarity of the design was the riser arranged in the middle of the dome axes. At 6 ft 6 in (1.98 m) in diameter, the AP class had the largest driving wheels of any steam locomotive used in India.

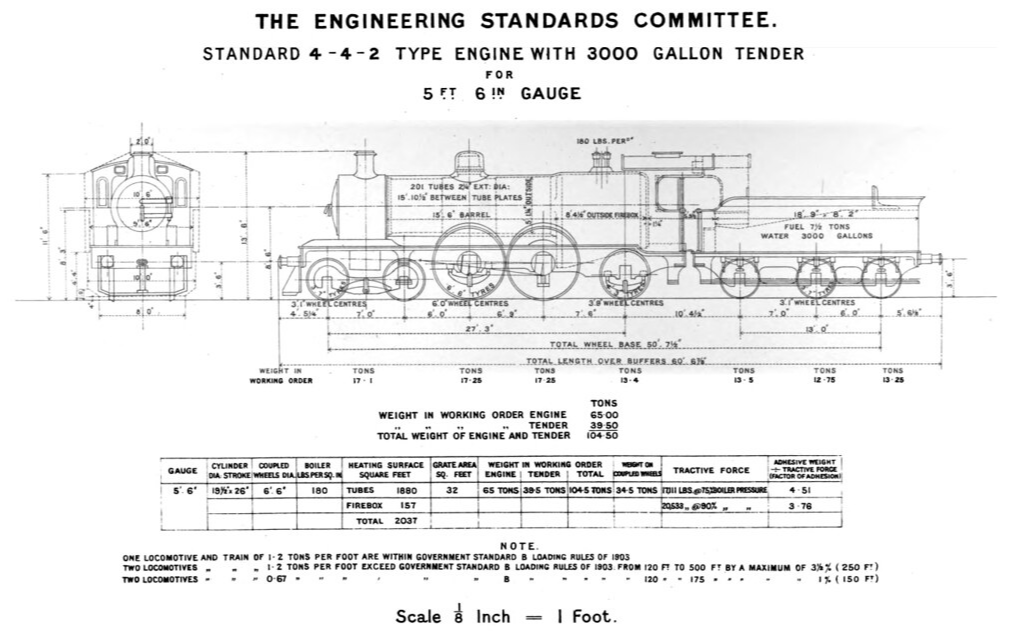
Variant with 3000 gallon tender

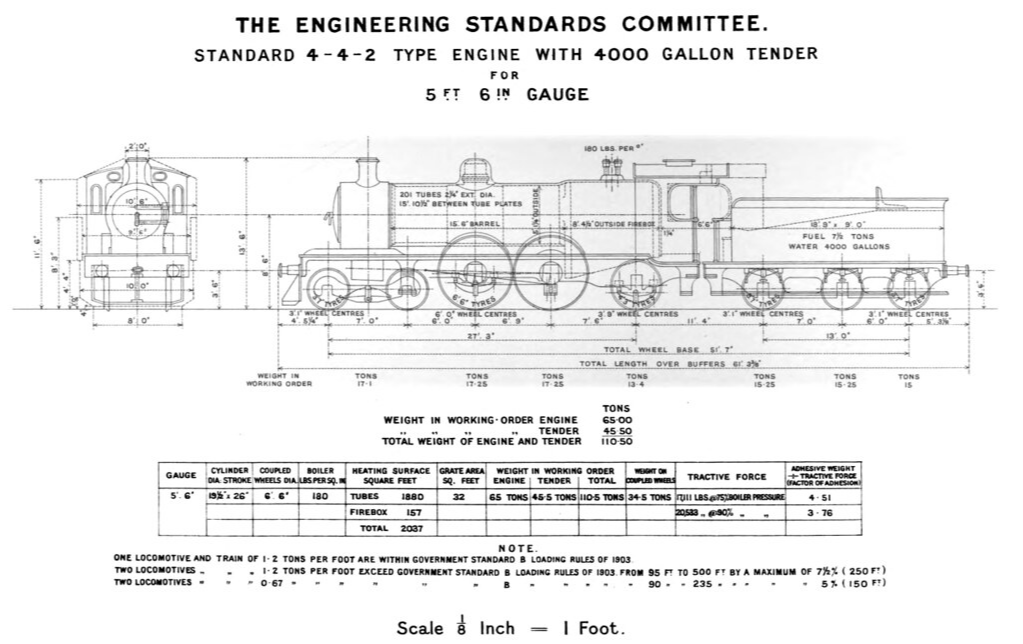
Variant with 4000 gallon tender

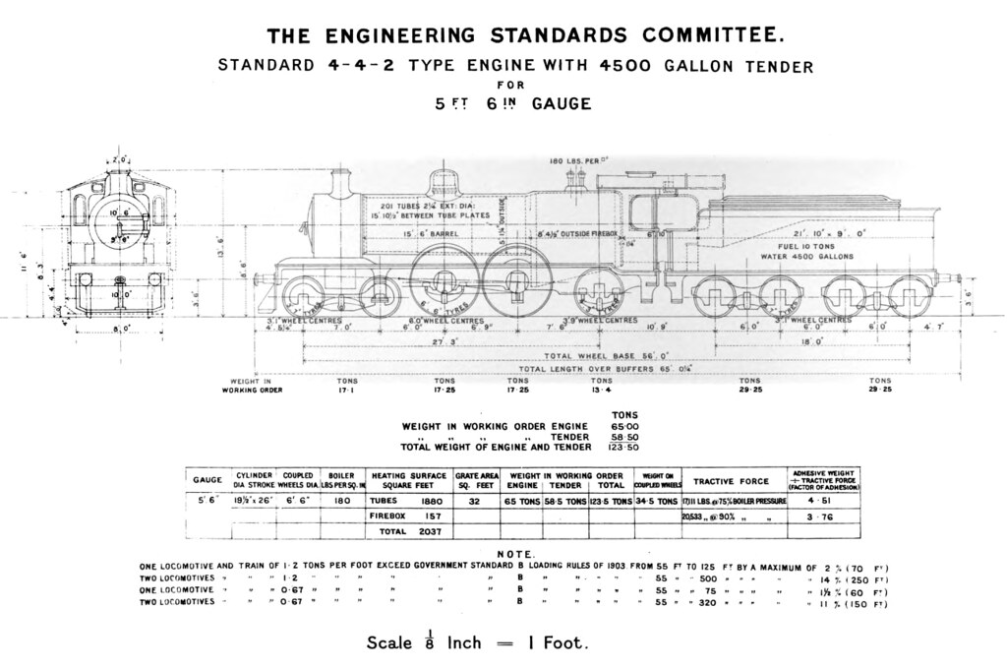
Variant with 4500 gallon tender

== Similar classes ==
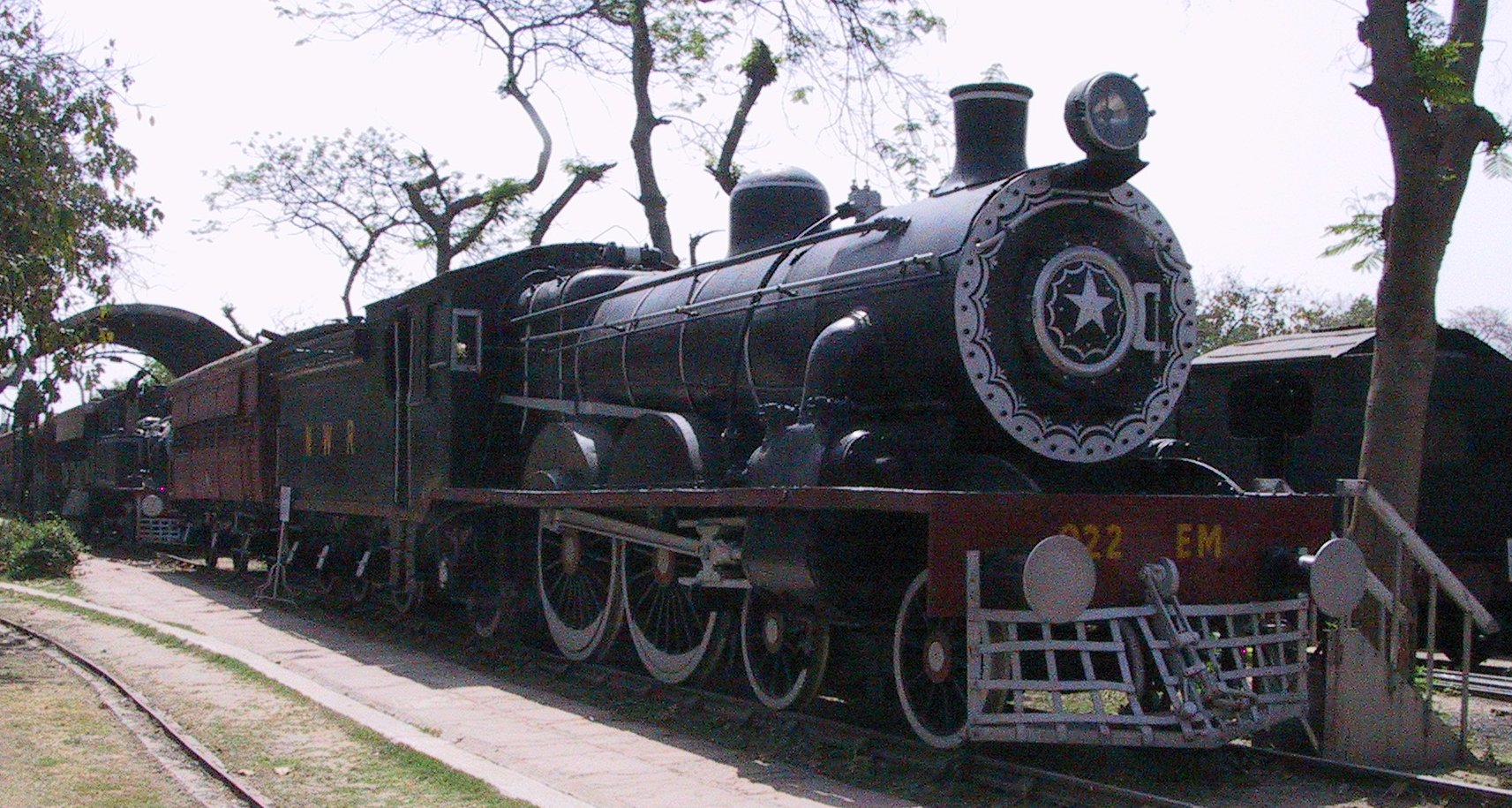
EM 922 in New Delhi

Locomotive 992 of the EM class, which is on display at the National Rail Museum of India in New Delhi, bears very similar main dimensions to the AP class locomotive; however, it was converted from an E1 class 4-6-0 locomotive of the Great Indian Peninsula Railway (GIPR), to which a trailing axle with an external frame was added. With a diameter of 6 ft 6 in, the driving wheels have the same dimensions as those of the AP class and have a short wheelbase, characteristic of the APs.
