= Malakand =

Malakand (Pashto: ملاکنډ) may refer to:

== Places in Pakistan ==
- Malakand Agency, a tribal area in the North West Frontier Province before 1970
- Malakand District, a district in Khyber Pakhtunkhwa, also known as Malakand Protected Area
- Malakand (union council), an administrative unit in Malakand District
- Malakand Division, an administrative division between 1970 and 2000
- Malakand Fort, a fort in Khyber Pakhtunwala
- Malakand Pass, a mountain pass, the location of Malakand Fort
- University of Malakand, a public university in Chakdara, Pakistan

== Other uses ==
- SS Malakand, the name of two ships

== See also ==
- Siege of Malakand
- Malakand Levies
