= Pirkhel =

- Union council
- Country: Pakistan
- Province: Khyber Pakhtunkhwa
- District: Malakand
- Time zone: UTC+5 (PST)

Pirkhel is an administrative unit, known as a union council, of Malakand district in the Khyber Pakhtunkhwa province of Pakistan.

District Malakand has two tehsils, Swat Ranizai and Sam Ranizai. Each tehsil comprises certain numbers of union councils. There are 28 union councils in Malakand district.
