= Middle Batkhela =

- Union Council
- Country: Pakistan
- Province: Khyber Pakhtunkhwa
- Tehsil: Batkhela

Government
  - District Member: Nasir Khan (PTI)
  - Tehsil Member: Ilyas Khan (ANP)
- Time zone: UTC+5 (PST)

Middle Batkhela is one of three administrative units that forms the union council of Batkhela Tehsil. The other two are the Lower Batkhela and Upper Batkhela in the Khyber Pakhtunkhwa province of Pakistan.

The district of Malakand has two Tehsils known as Swat Ranizai and Sam Ranizai. Each Tehsil comprises a number of union councils. There are 28 union councils in the district of Malakand.

== See also ==
- Malakand District
