= Lower Batkhela =

Middle Batkhela
- Union Council
- Country: Pakistan
- Province: Khyber Pakhtunkhwa
- Tehsil: Batkhela

Government
  - District Member: Amjad Ali (JI)
  - Tehsil Member: Unknown
- Time zone: UTC+5 (PST)

Lower Batkhela is one of three administrative unit, known as Union council, of Batkhela Tehsil other being the Middle Batkhela and Upper Batkhela in the Khyber Pakhtunkhwa province of Pakistan.

District Malakand has 2 Tehsils i.e. Swat Ranizai and Sam Ranizai. Each Tehsil comprises certain numbers of Union councils. There are 28 union councils in district Malakand.

== See also ==
- Malakand District
