= Shahkot Bandajaat =

- Union Council
- Country: Pakistan
- Province: Khyber Pakhtunkhwa
- District: Malakand
- Time zone: UTC+5 (PST)

Shahkot Bandajaat is an administrative unit, known as a union council, of Malakand District in the Khyber Pakhtunkhwa province of Pakistan.

Malakand District has two tehsils, Swat Ranizai and Sam Ranizai. Each tehsil comprises a number of union councils. There are 28 union councils in Malakand.
