= Upper Batkhela =

Middle Batkhela
- Union Council
- Country: Pakistan
- Province: Khyber Pakhtunkhwa
- Tehsil: Batkhela

Government
  - District Member: Saddam Hussain (Independent)
  - Tehsil Member: Fazal Wahid (JI)
- Time zone: UTC+5 (PST)

Upper Batkhela is one of three administrative unit, known as Union council, of Batkhela Tehsil other being the Lower Batkhela and Middle Batkhela in the Khyber Pakhtunkhwa province of Pakistan.

District Malakand has 2 Tehsils i.e. Swat Ranizai and Sam Ranizai. Each Tehsil comprises certain numbers of Union councils. There are 28 union councils in district Malakand.

== See also ==
- Malakand District
