= Thana Jadeed =

- Union Council
- Country: Pakistan
- Province: Khyber Pakhtunkhwa
- District: Malakand
- Time zone: UTC+5 (PST)

Thana Jadeed is an administrative unit, known as the Union Council, of Malakand District in the Khyber Pakhtunkhwa province of Pakistan.

District Malakand has 2 Tehsils i.e. Batkhela and Dargai. Each Tehsil comprises a certain number of Union councils. There are 26 union councils in district Malakand.

== See also ==
- Malakand District
