= Alladand =

Alladand Dheri
- Union Council
- Alladand Dheri
- Country: Pakistan
- Province: Khyber Pakhtunkhwa
- District: Malakand
- Time zone: UTC+5 (PST)

Alladand Dheri are two administrative units, known as Union council, of Malakand District in the Khyber Pakhtunkhwa province of Pakistan.

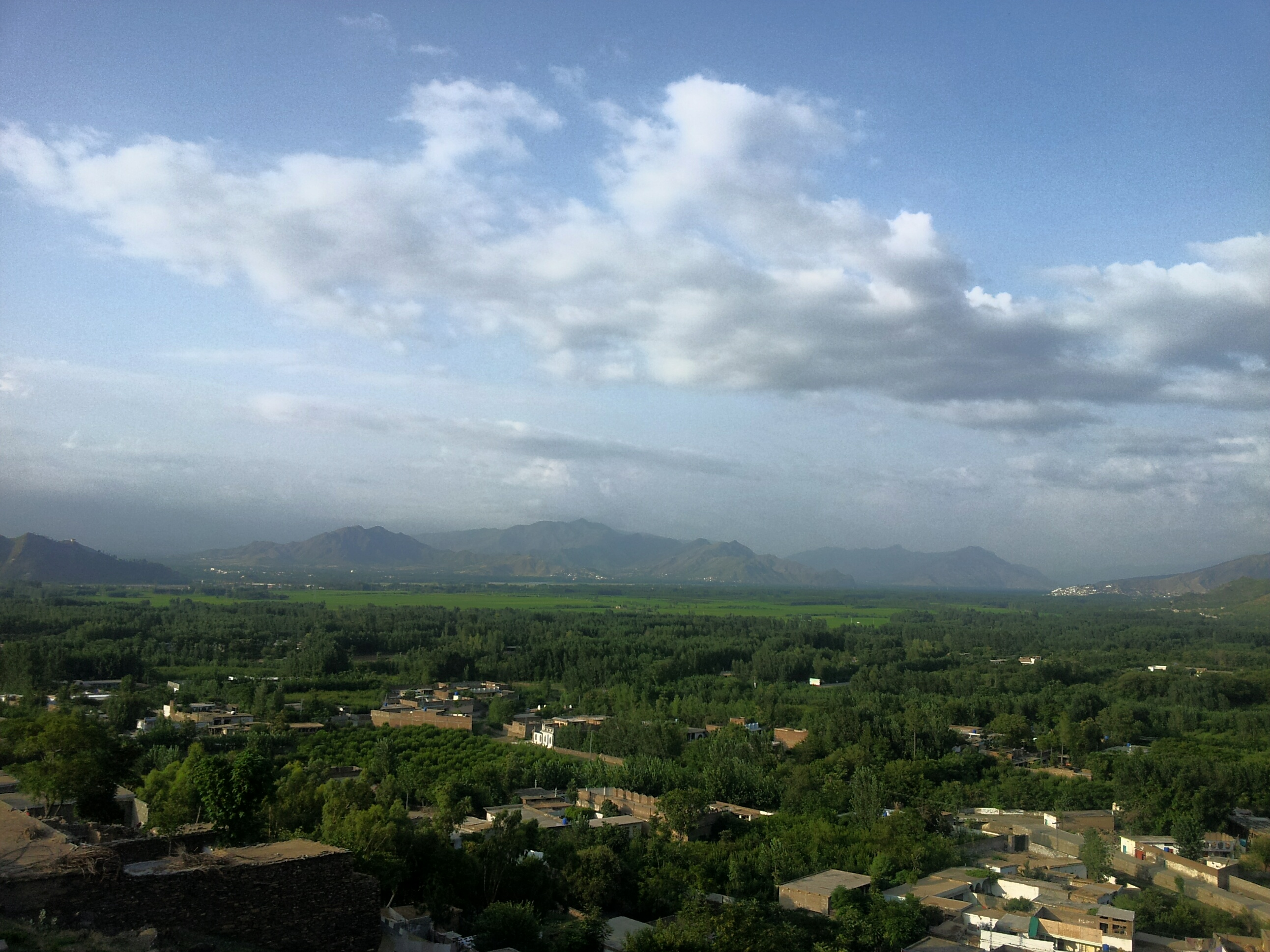
View of Alladand Dheri Valley, 2013

District Malakand has 2 Tehsils i.e. Swat Ranizai and Sam Ranizai. Each Tehsil comprises certain numbers of Union councils. There are 28 union councils in district Malakand and it's part of Swat Ranizai Tehsil.Alladand Dheri is situated in the mid of malakand and is one of the well known towns on Pashtun lands. It is considered the oldest home Yousufzai Tribe when they migrated from Afghanistan and settle in Alladand Dheri. The chief of Yousufzai tribe and founder of free Pakhtunkhwa state, Malik Ahmad Khan made it capital of the new state. The eminent Pashtun leader Malak Ahmad baba is buried in Dheri Alladand. People of Alladand Dheri are entirely from Pashtun and are from Yousufzai tribe. The land of this town is very fertile and is irrigated by River Swat. It shares a major part of supply of fruits and vegetables from Malakand District to whole Pakistan.

== See also ==
- Malakand District
