= Khar, Malakand =

Khar
- Union Council
- Country: Pakistan
- Province: Khyber Pakhtunkhwa
- District: Malakand
- Time zone: UTC+5 (PST)

Khar is an administrative unit, known as Union council, of Malakand District in the Khyber Pakhtunkhwa province of Pakistan. Khar is situated nearby to the village dheri, as well as near میخبند.

District Malakand has 2 Tehsils i.e. Swat Ranizai and Sam Ranizai. Each Tehsil comprises certain numbers of Union councils. There are 28 union councils in district Malakand.

== See also ==
- Malakand District
