= Gujar Garhi railway station =

Railway station in Pakistan

Gujar Garhi Railway Station گجر گڑھی ریلوے اسٹیشن

General information
- Owner: Ministry of Railways
- Line: Nowshera–Dargai Railway

Other information
- Status: unfunctional
- Station code: GJGR

Services
Preceding station	Pakistan Railways	Following station
Mardan Junction towards Nowshera Junction	Nowshera–Dargai Railway	Kalpani towards Dargai

Gujar Garhi Railway Station (Urdu: گجر گڑھی ریلوے اسٹیشن) is located in Mardan, Khyber Pakhtunkhwa, Pakistan.

== See also ==
- List of railway stations in Pakistan
- Pakistan Railways
