= Rashkai railway station =

Railway station in Pakistan

Rashkai Railway Station رشکئی ریلوے اسٹیشن

General information
- Owner: Ministry of Railways
- Line: Nowshera–Dargai Railway

Other information
- Station code: RSK

Services
Preceding station	Pakistan Railways	Following station
Risalpur Cantonment towards Nowshera Junction	Nowshera–Dargai Railway	Mardan Junction towards Dargai
Location

Rashakai Railway Station (Urdu: رشکئی ریلوے اسٹیشن) is located in Pakistan.

== See also ==
- List of railway stations in Pakistan
- Pakistan Railways
