= Dargai =

Dargai درگئی
- City and Tehsil
- Location in Pakistan
- Coordinates: 34°30′28.5″N 71°53′55.2″E
- Country: Pakistan
- Region: Khyber Pakhtunkhwa
- District: Malakand District

Government
  - MNA (NA-09): Junaid Akbar (Pakistan Tehreek-e-Insaf)
  - Chairman: Pir Islam Khan
- Elevation: 461 m (1,512 ft)

Population (2023)
  - Total: 257,807
- Time zone: UTC+5 (PST)
- Postal code: 23060

Dargai (درگئی; درگئی) is a city and one of the two tehsils of Malakand District (the other being Batkhela) in the Khyber Pakhtunkhwa province of Pakistan. According to the 2023 Census, the tehsil had a population of 257,807. It is situated on the primary highway connecting Peshawar to the northern regions of Swat, Dir, and Chitral.

== Geography ==
The city is situated at an elevation of approximately 461 meters (1,512 feet) on the plains at the foot of the Hindu Kush foothills. Its location is of immense strategic importance as it serves as the gateway to the Malakand Pass. While Dargai itself lies on relatively level ground, the terrain rises sharply to the north, where the pass reaches an elevation of approximately 1,362 meters (4,468 feet). This transition from the Peshawar plains to the rugged northern highlands defined Dargai's historical role as a military outpost and a vital commercial terminus for the branch railway.

== Administration ==
Historically, Dargai was a part of the Malakand Agency, a Provincially Administered Tribal Area (PATA). In 1970, following the dissolution of the princely states of Chitral, Dir, and Swat, the Malakand Division was established. The division was subsequently organized into districts, with Dargai becoming part of the Malakand Protected Area, now known as the Malakand District. While the Malakand Division was briefly abolished in 2000 during administrative reforms, it was later restored. The term "Malakand Agency" is still occasionally used colloquially to refer to the administrative area.

== Economy ==
Dargai serves as a significant commercial hub, facilitating trade between the northern mountainous regions and the lower districts of Khyber Pakhtunkhwa. The city is a major market for timber and serves as the northernmost terminus of the railway line in the region, historically marking the end of the rail link into Northern Pakistan. The completion of the Upper Swat Canal and associated hydroelectric projects at Jabban and Dargai in the mid-20th century further enhanced the area's economic importance through improved irrigation and power generation.

== History ==
=== Early History and Tribal Settlement ===
The region of Malakand and Dargai has historically served as a strategic gateway between the Swat Valley and the Peshawar plains. In the 16th century, the Yousafzai Pashtuns, including the Ranizai sub-tribe, migrated into the area from Kabul, displacing the local Dalazak tribes and establishing the current tribal geography. During the 18th century, the area was nominally part of the Durrani Empire. By the early 19th century, the expansion of the Sikh Empire under Ranjit Singh reached the southern fringes of the Malakand Agency. Following the Battle of Nowshera in 1823, Sikh influence grew in the nearby Peshawar valley, but the rugged Malakand Pass remained under the control of independent tribes who frequently resisted outside incursions.

=== British Colonial Period ===
The British commenced their campaign against Malakand in 1852, shortly after the annexation of the Punjab. In March 1852, a brigade under the command of Sir Colin Campbell raided Dargai and Kharkai—villages belonging to the Ranizai tribe at the foot of the Malakand Pass. Following the use of artillery by British forces, the Ranizais agreed to terms, though resistance continued in the Buner Valley under the leadership of Syed Akhbar Shah.

==== Railway Development (1886) ====
In 1886, the British established the Dargai railway station as the terminus of the Nowshera–Dargai Branch Line. This infrastructure served as a strategic "lifeline" for the upper parts of the province, catering to the large-scale transportation of goods and troops to Malakand, Mardan, Charsadda, and Swabi.

==== Chitral Expedition and 1897 Uprisings ====
In 1895, the British launched the Chitral Expedition to relieve a besieged garrison. The main force was commanded by Major-General Sir Robert Low, while Colonel James Kelly led a column from Gilgit. They fought against Umara Khan, the Khan of Jandul, whom Winston Churchill described as the "Afghan Napoleon."

The Siege of Malakand took place in 1897 during a widespread tribal uprising led by Saidullah Khan, a religious leader known locally as Sartor Faqir ("the Bareheaded Fakir") or Mullah Mastan. In his 1898 memoir, Churchill referred to him as the "Mad Mullah," describing his ability to rouse thousands of tribesmen through religious fervor. Local accounts record the participation of Pukhtoon women in the resistance, including Shaheeda Abai (Martyred Grandmother), who died in battle while supplying the fighters. Sartor Faqir continued to lead resistance until his death in 1917.

==== The Battle of Dargai Heights (1897) ====
The Dargai Heights were the site of a famous engagement during the Tirah campaign on 20 October 1897. The heights, held by Afridi tribesmen, were stormed by the Gordon Highlanders and the 2nd King Edward VII's Own Gurkha Rifles. Four Victoria Crosses were awarded for gallantry during the battle. The victory allowed the Tirah Field Force to advance, though the conflict only concluded in April 1898. The event is commemorated in the pipe march "The Heights of Dargai" and artistic tributes at the National Army Museum.

=== Post-Independence and Modern Era ===
Following the independence of Pakistan in 1947, the railway remained a vital economic link for the Malakand division. The Dargai railway station was fully operational until 1992, maintaining a regular schedule of passenger and freight services from Karachi and the Punjab. Although authorities suspended regular operations in the early 1990s without presenting a specific reason, the infrastructure remained functional for years; the last recorded freight train reached the station on 14 April 2010.

In the early 21st century, Dargai was significantly impacted by regional militancy. On 8 November 2006, a suicide attack targeted a military training center in the town, resulting in the deaths of 42 soldiers. In the immediate aftermath of the blast, local civilians were noted for their courage and coordination, utilizing private vehicles to transport wounded soldiers to hospitals when official transport was overwhelmed. This spirit of community support continued between 2009 and 2012, as Dargai residents provided extensive aid and shelter to internally displaced persons fleeing nearby conflict and the 2010 Pakistan floods.

The area is the home constituency of Junaid Akbar, a prominent politician from Pakistan Tehreek-e-Insaf. Due to persistent local advocacy from the business community and leaders such as Minister for Railways Ghulam Ahmad Bilour and Chief Minister Ameer Haider Khan Hoti, the government announced the "Peshawar Valley Railway" project in 2025. This initiative aims to rehabilitate the Nowshera–Dargai line to restore its historical role as a regional transport terminus.

== Local attractions and Malakand Hydropower Projects ==
Today, scenic locations in Dargai include the Jabban (Malakand-I), Dargai (Malakand-II) and Dargai (Malakand-III) hydro-electric projects where water passes through a 3 miles (4.8 km) tunnel before entering a natural drop of 350 feet (110 m). The two power houses at Dargai and Jabban have recently been supplemented by a third 81 MW facility Malakand-III hydropower station completed in 2008. The Punjab Regimental Centre is located near Dargai Railway Station.

== Transport ==
Dargai is the terminus of the Nowshera–Dargai Branch Line, which connects the region to the Pakistan Railways network via Nowshera. While the station buildings and assets suffered from neglect and encroachment following its closure in 1992, the core infrastructure, including the rail track and a rare rail turbine, has been reported to be in functional condition.

In 2025, the government announced the "Peshawar Valley Railway" project, which aims to rehabilitate the Nowshera–Mardan–Dargai section for renewed passenger and freight traffic. As of 2026, plans are underway to resume services using diesel multiple units to provide a cost-effective alternative to road transport.

== See also ==
- Batkhela
- Malakand
