= Kalpani railway station =

Railway station in Pakistan

Coordinates: 34.243292°N 71.984509°E

Kalpani Railway Station کلپانی ریلوے اسٹیشن

General information
- Owner: Ministry of Railways
- Line: Nowshera–Dargai Railway

Other information
- Status: Nonfunctional
- Station code: KPC

Services
| Preceding station | Pakistan Railways | Following station |
|---|---|---|
| Gujar Garhi towards Nowshera Junction | Nowshera–Dargai Railway | Takht-I-Bhai towards Dargai |
Location

Kalpani Railway Station (Urdu: کلپانی ریلوے اسٹیشن) is located in Mardan, Khyber Pakhtunkhwa Pakistan.

== See also ==
- List of railway stations in Pakistan
- Pakistan Railways
