= Risalpur Cantonment railway station =

Railway station in Risalpur, Pakistan

Risalpur Cantonment Station رسالپور کینٹ ریلوے اسٹیشن

General information
- Owner: Ministry of Railways
- Line: Nowshera–Dargai Railway

Other information
- Station code: RCS

History
- Opened: 1901

Services
| Preceding station | Pakistan Railways | Following station |
|---|---|---|
| Nowshera Junction Terminus | Nowshera–Dargai Railway | Rashkai towards Dargai |
Location

Risalpur Cantonment Railway Station (Urdu: رسالپور کینٹ ریلوے اسٹیشن) is located in Risalpur, Pakistan. There is also a locumovtive factory in Risalpur, which was built with the help of Japan.

== See also ==
- List of railway stations in Pakistan
- Pakistan Railways
- Pakistan Locomotive Factory
