= Government Post Graduate College Dargai =

Pakistani college

Coordinates: 34°30′33″N 71°54′32″E

- Address: Dargai Malakand, Pakistan
- Type: Public Sector
- Established: July 1977
- Location: Dargai, Pakistan
- Website: Official Website

Government Post Graduate College Dargai Malakand is located in Dargai, Khyber Pakhtunkhwa, Pakistan. The college currently offers programs at Intermediate affiliated with Board of Intermediate and Secondary Education Malakand, Bachelor, Master and 4 years BS programs in various disciplines.

== Overview & History ==
Government Post Graduate College Dargai Malakand is situated college in Dargai Malakand. The college as intermediate college in July 1977. The college attained degree college status in August 1983. Computer Science course was introduced in 2002.

The college campus has total area of 36 acres. The latest addition to college teaching programs are BS 4-year programs in the subject Computer Science, English, Zoology, Botany, Chemistry, Physics, Maths, Urdu and Political Science.

== Departments and Faculties ==
The college currently has the following faculties.

=== Faculty of Social Sciences ===
- Department of Economics
- Department of English
- Department of Geography
- Department of History
- Department of Islamiyat
- Department of Law
- Department of Pakistan Studies
- Department of Physical Education
- Department of Political Science
- Department of Pashto
- Department of Urdu

=== Faculty of Biological Sciences ===
- Department of Zoology
- Department of Botany

=== Faculty of Physical Sciences ===
- Department of Chemistry
- Department of Computer Science
- Department of Maths
- Department of Statistics
- Department of Physics

== Academic programs ==
The college currently offers the following programs.

=== Intermediate ===
- This institution doesn't offer any program on intermediate level.

College has been closed.

=== Master Level (2 years) ===
- MSc – Mathematics
- MSc - Chemistry
- MA - English

=== BS Degrees (4 years) ===
- BS Computer Science
- BS English
- BS Mathematics
- BS Chemistry
- BS Political Science
- BS Economics
- BS Physics
- BS Statistics
- BS Electronics
- BS Zoology
- BS Gender Studies
- BS Urdu

== See also ==
- University of Malakand
- Shaheed Benazir Bhutto University, Sheringal
