= HTN =

HTN can refer to:

== Computing ==
- Hierarchical task network, planning formalism in artificial intelligence
- "Homesteading the Noosphere", essay on computer programming

== Medicine ==
- Hypertension

== Organisations ==
- Home Theater Network, defunct movie subscription service
- Houghton Mifflin, now part of Houghton Mifflin Harcourt
- Hughes Television Network, defunct American television network

== Transport ==
- Hammonton station, New Jersey, United States
- Hathiyan railway station, Pakistan
- Hatton railway station, Sri Lanka
- Hatton (Warwickshire) railway station, England
- Hotan Airport, Xinjiang, China
- Houten railway station, Netherlands
