= Takht-I-Bhai railway station =

Railway station in Pakistan

Takht-i-Bhai Railway Station تخت بھائی ریلوے اسٹیشن

General information
- Coordinates: 34.2772°N 71.9310°E
- Owner: Ministry of Railways
- Line: Nowshera–Dargai Railway

Other information
- Status: unfunctional
- Station code: TEB

Services
Preceding station	Pakistan Railways	Following station
Kalpani towards Nowshera Junction	Nowshera–Dargai Railway	Hathiyan towards Dargai
Location

Takht-i-Bhai Railway Station (Urdu: تخت بھائی ریلوے اسٹیشن) is located in town of Takht-i-Bahi, Mardan District, Pakistan.

== See also ==
- List of railway stations in Pakistan
- Pakistan Railways
