= Skhakot railway station =

Railway station in Pakistan

Skhakot Railway Station سخاکوٹ ریلوے اسٹیشن

General information
- Owner: Ministry of Railways
- Line: Nowshera–Dargai Railway

Other information
- Station code: SKC

Services
Preceding station	Pakistan Railways	Following station
Hathiyan towards Nowshera Junction	Nowshera–Dargai Railway	Dargai Terminus

Skhakot Railway Station (Urdu: سخاکوٹ ریلوے اسٹیشن) is located in Pakistan.

== See also ==
- List of railway stations in Pakistan
- Pakistan Railways
