= Mardan Junction railway station =

Railway station in Pakistan

Mardan Junction Railway Station مردان جنکشن ریلوے اسٹیشن
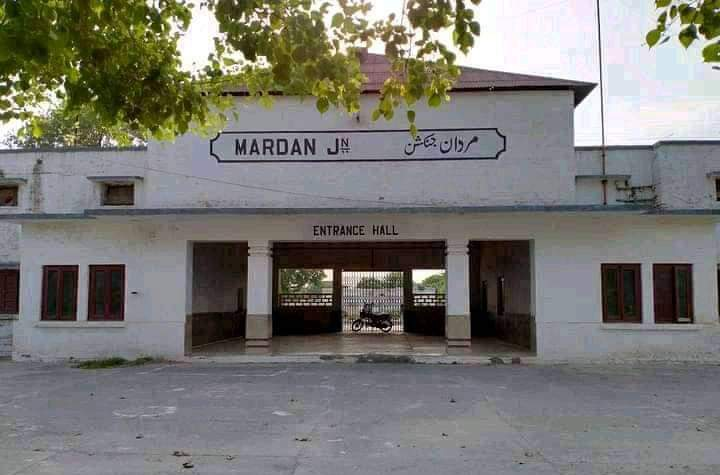

General information
- Location: Nowshera Road, Mardan, Khyber Pakhtunkhwa 23000
- Coordinates: 34.1844°N 72.0332°E
- Owner: Ministry of Railways
- Lines: Nowshera–Dargai Railway; Peshawar Circular Railway

Other information
- Status: Nonfunctional
- Station code: MDX
- Fare zone: 2

History
- Opened: 1901

Services
Preceding station	Pakistan Railways	Following station
Rashkai towards Nowshera Junction	Nowshera–Dargai Railway	Takht-I-Bhai towards Dargai
Preceding station	Peshawar Circular Railway	Following station
Nowshera Junction towards Peshawar Cantonment	(proposed)	Charsadda Terminus
Location
- Location within Khyber Pakhtunkhwa Location within Pakistan

Mardan Junction Railway Station (Urdu: مردان جنکشن ریلوے اسٹیشن, Pashto: د مردان جنکشن اورګاډي سټيشن) is located in Mardan, in Khyber Pakhtunkhwa province of Pakistan.

== See also ==
- List of railway stations in Pakistan
- Pakistan Railways
