= Hathiyan railway station =

Railway station in Pakistan

Hathian Railway Station ہاتھیان ریلوے اسٹیشن

General information
- Owner: Ministry of Railways
- Line: Nowshera–Dargai Railway

Other information
- Station code: HTN

History
- Opened: 1886

Services
Preceding station	Pakistan Railways	Following station
Takht-I-Bhai towards Nowshera Junction	Nowshera–Dargai Railway	Skhakot towards Dargai

Hathiyan Railway Station (Urdu: ہتھیان ریلوے اسٹیشن) is located in Pakistan.

It was established in 1886 during British India era.
