= Ghari Usmani Khel =

Usmani Khel
- Union Council
- Country: Pakistan
- Province: Khyber Pakhtunkhwa
- District: Malakand
- Time zone: UTC+5 (PST)

Garhi Usmani Khel is an administrative unit, known as Union council, of Malakand District in the Khyber Pakhtunkhwa province of Pakistan.

== See also ==
- Malakand District
