= Nowshera–Dargai Railway =

Railway line in Pakistan

Overview
- Native name: نوشہرہ –درگئی ریلوے
- Status: Partially-Suspended
- Owner: Pakistan Railways
- Termini: Nowshera Junction; Dargai
- Stations: 12

Service
- Operator: Pakistan Railways

History
- Opened: 1901

Technical
- Line length: 64 km (40 mi)
- Track gauge: 1,676 mm (5 ft 6 in)

Nowshera–Dargai Railway (Urdu: نوشہرہ –درگئی ریلوے) is one of several railway lines in Pakistan. The line begin at Nowshera Junction and end at Dargai. The total length of this railway line is 64 kilometers (40 mi). There are 12 railway stations from Nowshera Junction to Dargai. Currently, this line is active between Nowshera and Risalpur only for Pakistan Locomotive Factoty Risalpur.

== History ==
Opened in 1901, the line served the Malakand Division until 2002 when train service was suspended. In April 2017, Pakistan Railways proposed to rebuild the line and extend it north towards Batkhela.

== Stations ==
- Nowshera Junction
- Kabul River
- Risalpur Cantonment
- Rashkai
- Mardan Junction > to Charsadda
- Gujar Garhi
- Kalpani
- Takht-I-Bhai
- Parkhoo Dheri
- Hathiyan
- Sakhakot
- Dargai

== See also ==
- Samasata-Amruka Branch Line
- Karachi–Peshawar Railway Line
- Railway lines in Pakistan
