= Parkhoo Dheri railway station =

Railway station in Pakistan

Parkhoo Dheri Station پرخو ڈھیری اسٹیشن

General information
- Coordinates: 34.329015°N 71.938197°E
- Owner: Ministry of Railways
- Line: Nowshera–Dargai Railway

Other information
- Station code: PDC
Location

Parkhoo Dheri railway station (Urdu: پرخوڈھیری ریلوے اسٹیشن) is a railway station located in District Mardan, Pakistan.

== See also ==
- List of railway stations in Pakistan
- Pakistan Railways
