= SS Malakand =

SS Malakand may refer to at least two ships, both of the Brocklebank Line, named after the Malakand area of the Indian subcontinent:

- SS Malakand (1905), a cargo liner launched in 1905 and sunk in 1917
- SS Malakand (1919), a cargo liner built in 1919 which exploded at Liverpool in 1941
