= Ranizai =

Yousafzai Pashtun Tribe

The Ranizai (Pashto: رانیزی) are a subtribe of the Yusufzai Pashtun tribe in the Malakand District in Khyber Pakhtunkhwa, Pakistan. The Ranizai tribe has occupied the upper part of the district of Malakand. The various important villages include Thana, Alladand Dheri, Batkhela, Khar, Dheri Julagram, Totakan Mekhband Sholwai, and Matkani. Alladand Dheri Village was the head office. The various sub-tribes of Ranizai are Ali Khel. Ali Khel live in Village Dheri Alladand.

Ali Khels are divided into 6 Khels (Branches):

(1) Azi Khel, (2) Mali Khel, (3) Fateh Khel, (4) Amir Khan Khel, (5) Shahab Khel, (6) Aidal Khel.

Azi Khel: Azi Khel have two homes

Malak Kor and Sheikh Kor

Aidal Khel: Aidal Khel is divided into 2 sub-khels named Miras Khel and Nazar Ali Khel.

Azi Khel have another Khel called Kachu Khel, which is named after Kachu Khan, one of the famous tribal chiefs in Ranizai Swat.

Ranizai is further divided into 5 sub-khels, which are:

1) Mardan Khel (2) Ismail Khel (3) Umbarak Khel (4) Dadi Khel (5) Kari Khel
