= Batkhela =

Batkhela بٹ خیلہ بټ خېله
- City
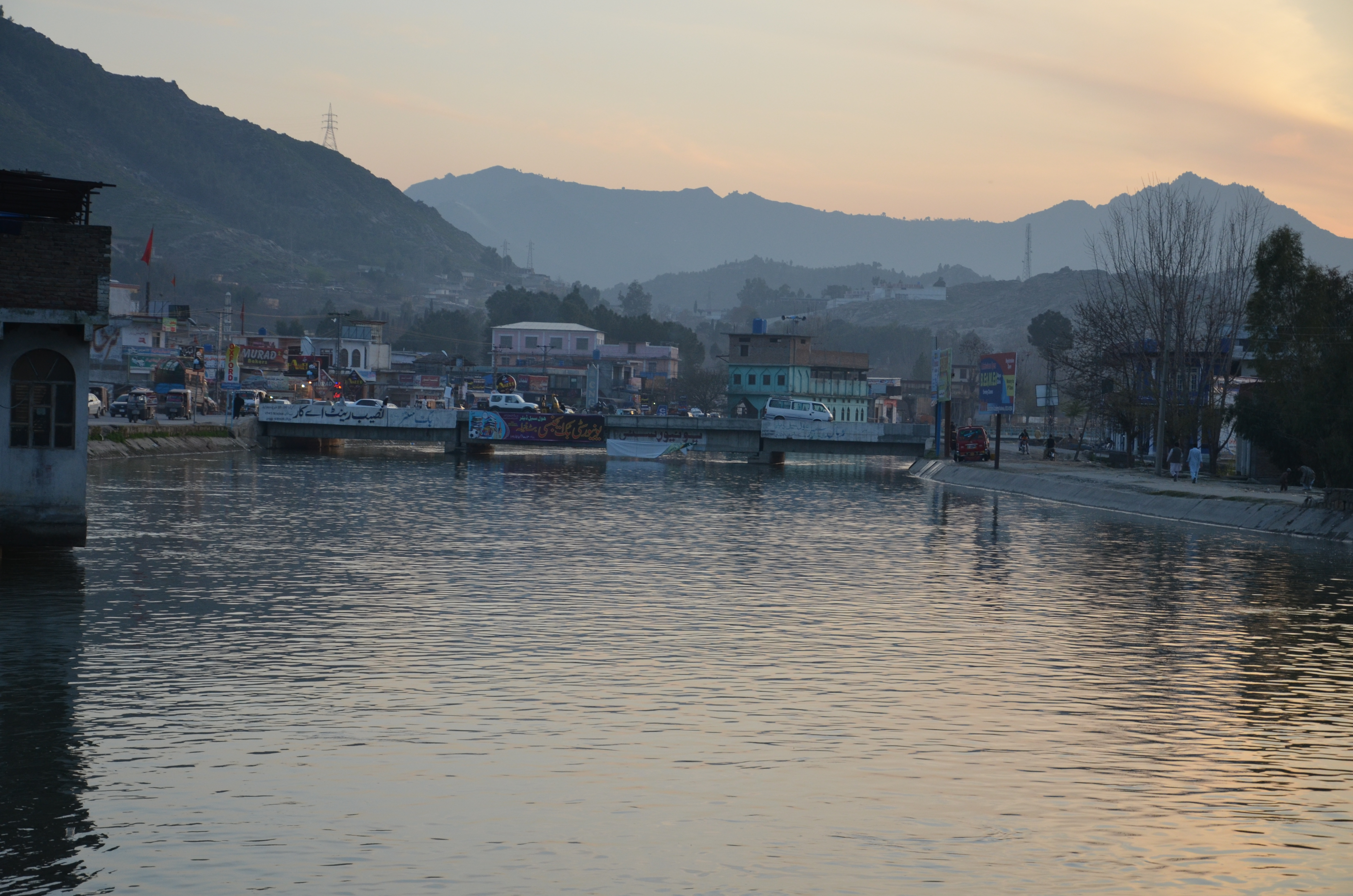
- Batkhela Canal flows through the city

- Location within Khyber Pakhtunkhwa Location within Pakistan
- Coordinates: 34.62°N 71.97°E
- Country: Pakistan
- Province: Khyber Pakhtunkhwa
- District: Malakand
- Tehsil: Swat Rani Zai Tehsil
- Established: March 1895 (British)

Government
  - Type: Tehsil, City
  - Governing body: Union Council (3 Seats)
  - AC/Sub divisional Magistrate/Deputy Commandant: Aun Haider (PAS)
  - Tehsil Nazim: Adnan Ibrar (PMS)
  - Upper Batkhela: Fazal Wahid Lalagi (JI)

Area
  - City: 1,001 km^{2} (386 sq mi)
- Elevation: 648 m (2,126 ft)

Population (2023 census)
  - Urban: 73,525
- Time zone: UTC+5 (PST)
- Website: nwfp.gov.pk

Batkhela (Pashto: بټ خېله, Urdu: بٹ خیلہ) is a city, tehsil and the district headquarter of the Malakand District within the Khyber Pakhtunkhwa province of Pakistan. According to the 2017 Census of Pakistan, the population of Batkhela was recorded at 68,200. Batkhela is considered as one of the most popular business cities in the Khyber Pakhtunkhwa province. A water canal that pours into a small dam in the Jabban area near Batkhela is the main source of electricity production here.

Batkhela General Civil Headquarters Hospital is the main hospital of the district Malakand. Batkhela's main bazaar is more than 4.0 Kilometres long. Making it Asia's longest Bazar.

== History ==
=== Etymology ===
During the Ashoka and Kanishka Empires, Batkhela was ruled by a leader named Butt. The name "Batkhela" is, hence, associated with his name.

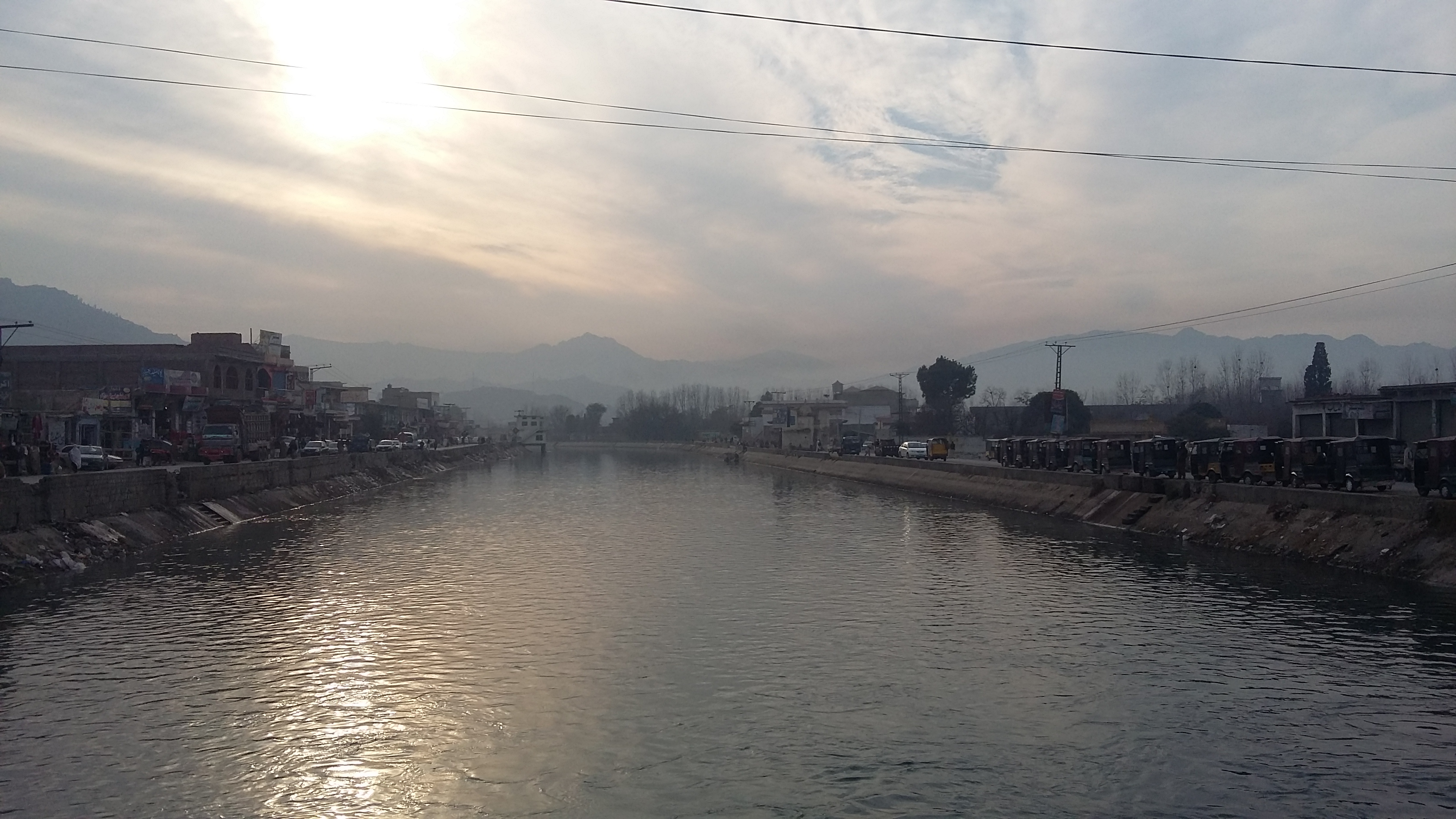
Batkhela water canal

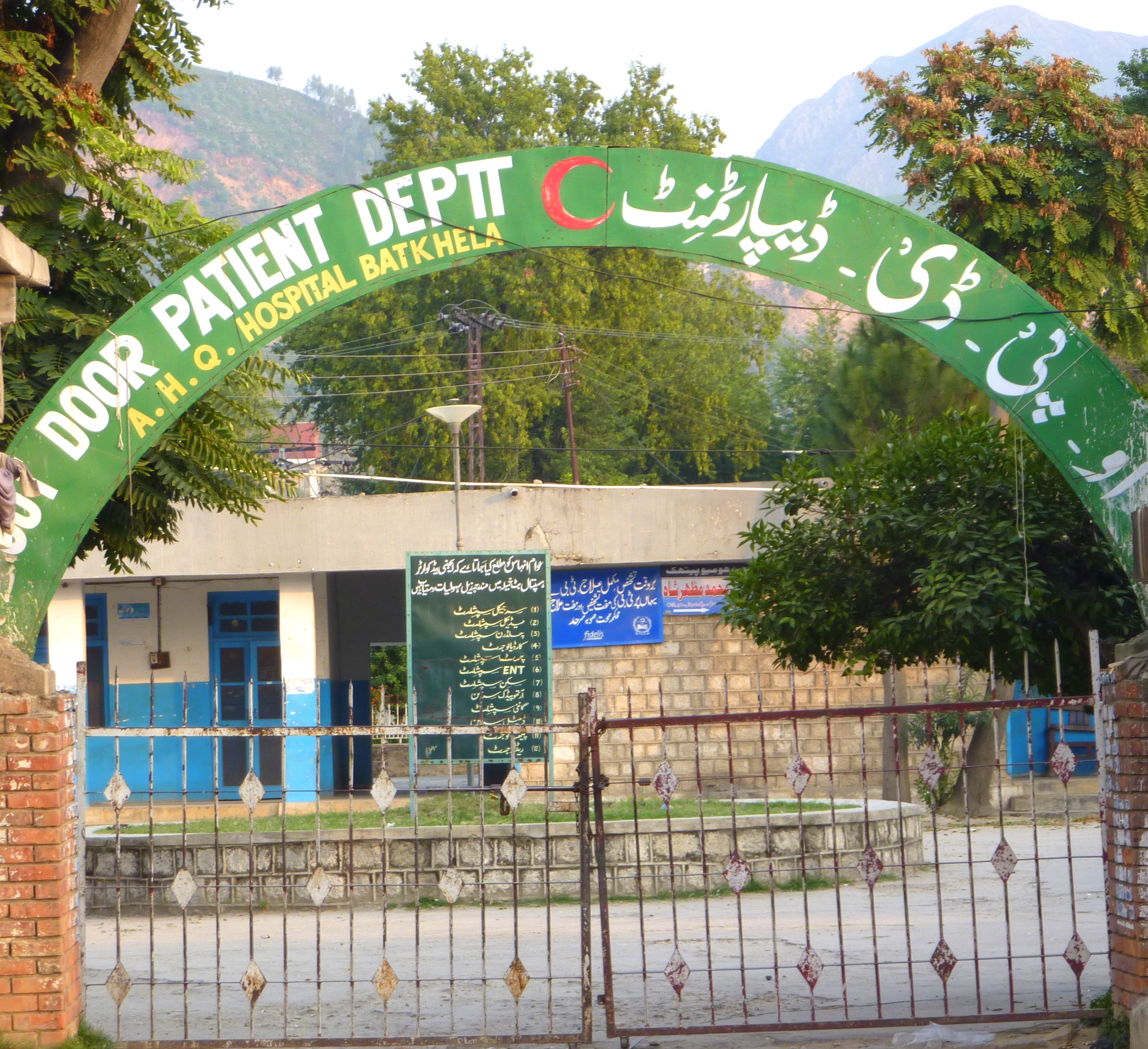
District Headquarters Hospital Batkhela OPD

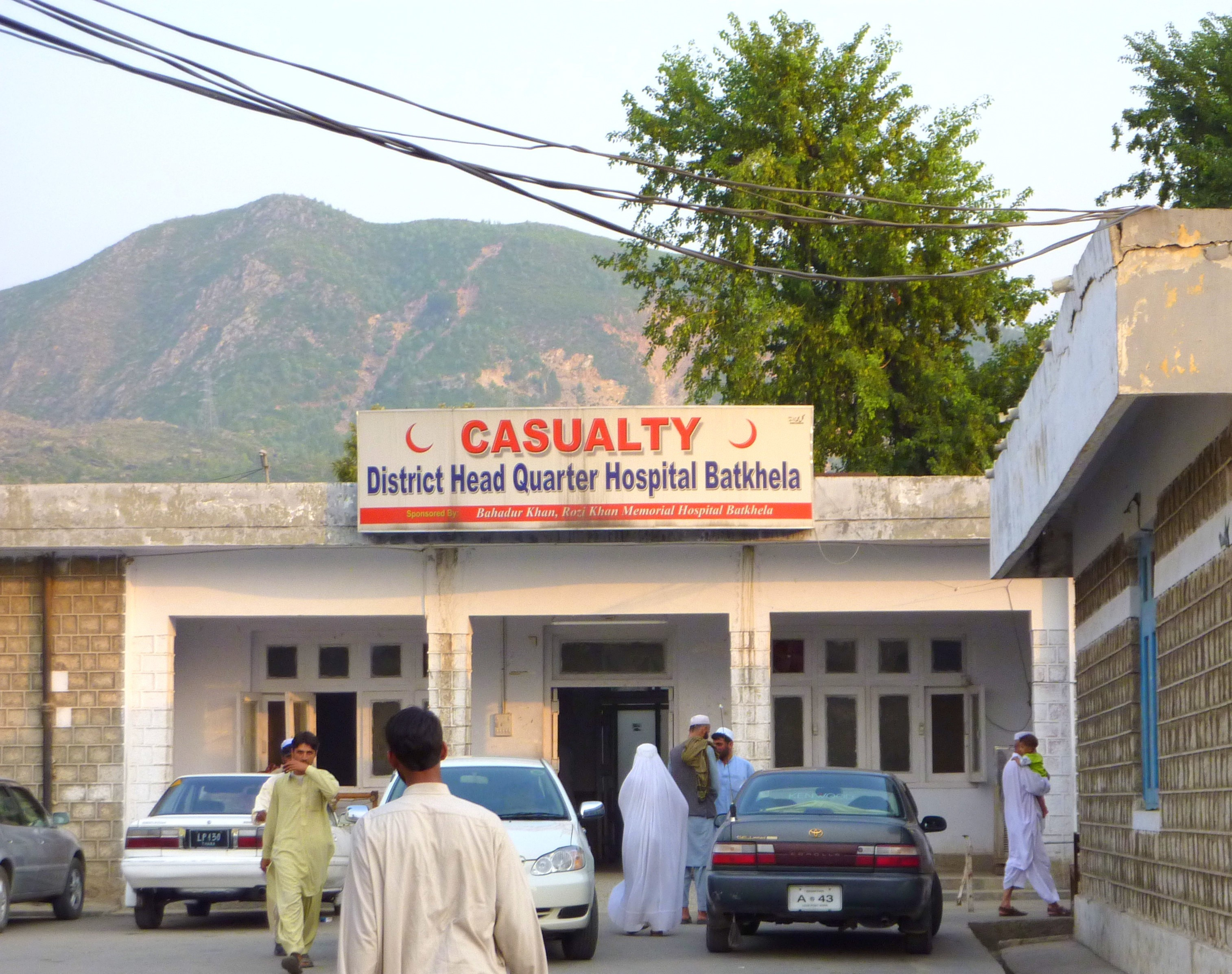
District Headquarters Hospital Batkhela Casualty

=== Early history ===
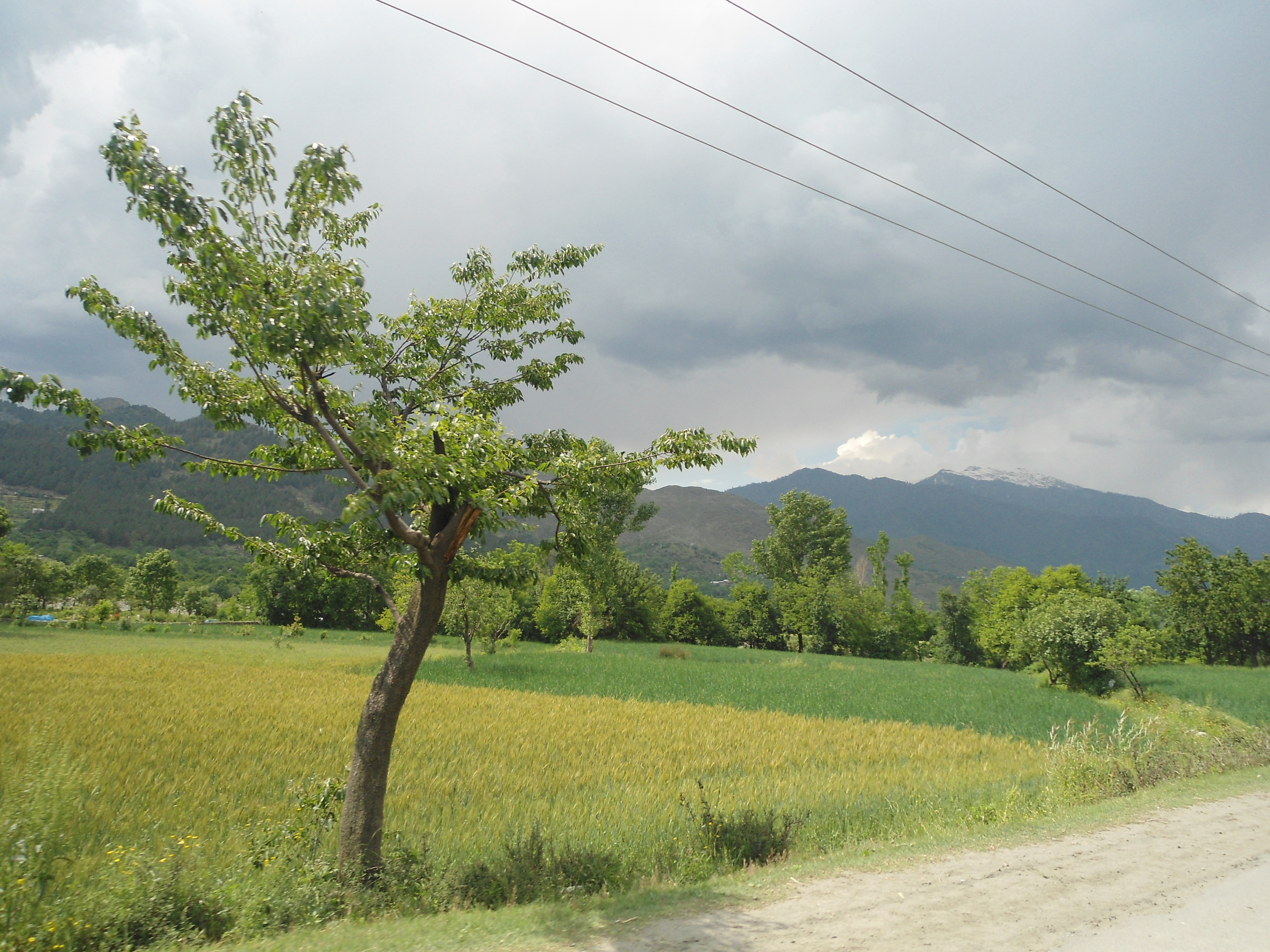
Batkhela Rural side

At the time when Mahmud of Ghazni (997-1030) was attacking India, one of his army leaders Pir Khushal assailed Batkhela. During the course of this assault, most of his soldiers were sunk in a big marsh at a place called Gheli in Batkhela. However, the soldiers of his army that survived had preferred to stay in this region. Over time, they put strong influence on the local inhabitants. They not only changed the culture and customs of them but also exerted a strong influence to convert them to Islam.

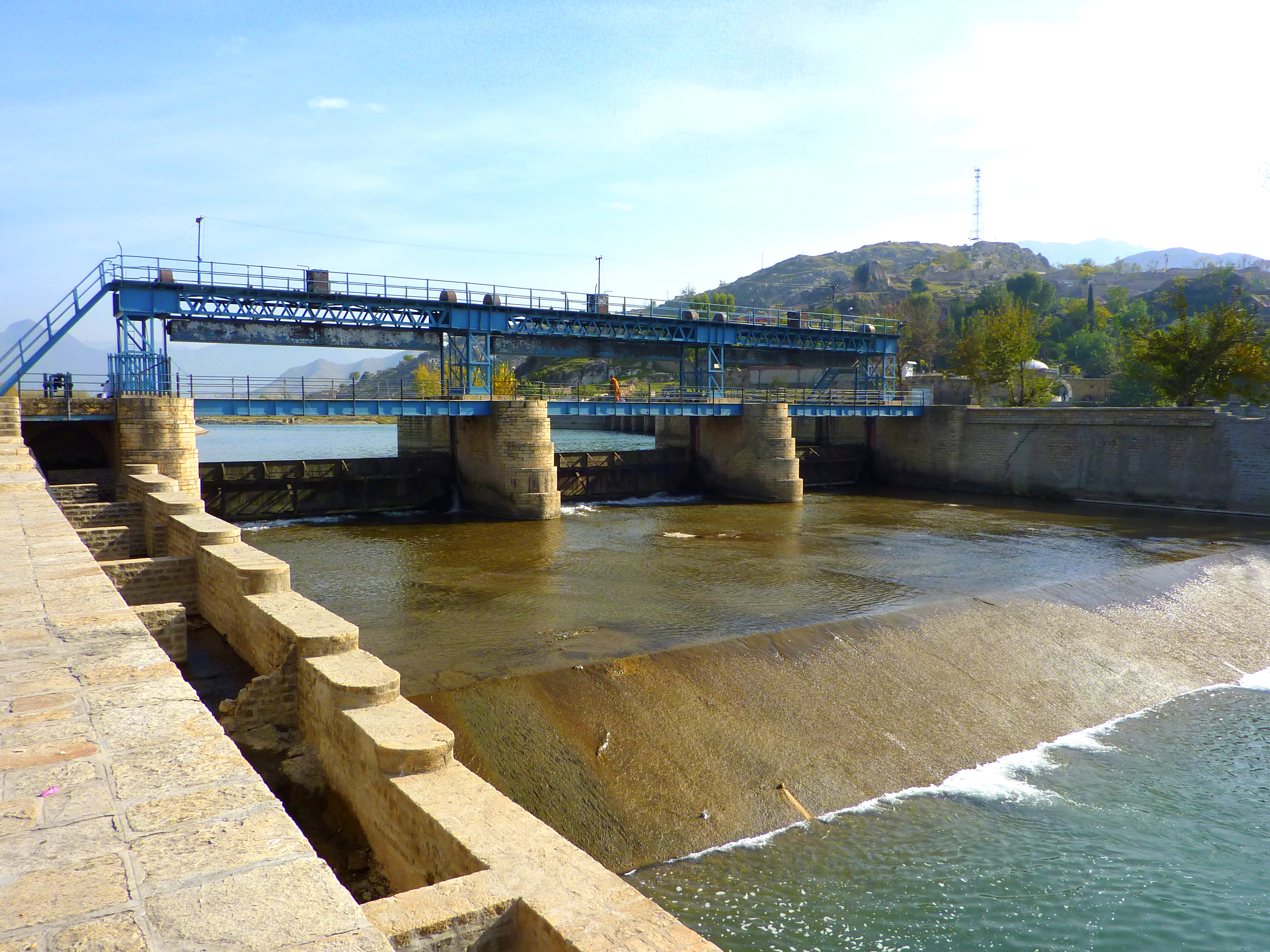
Amandara Head Works (water flow on floor)

Early in the 17th century, an Afghan tribe called Yusufzai (Yusufzai Pathan) invaded the Swat region under the leadership of Malik Ahmad Khan. During this period, Batkhela was part of the Swat Valley. At that time, Swat was ruled by a ruler named Raees. Swati tribe was a permanent inhabitant there. After the invasion, most of the Swati tribe's people left this area and escaped. It gave the Yusufzai tribe an opportunity to settle there permanently. Subsequently, they declared the Thana region (currently a part of the Batkhela tehsil) as their administrative headquarters.

In the beginning, three family classes of Yusufzai tribe were settled in Batkhela: Ibrahim Khel, Husain Khel and Nazrali Khel.

In March 1895, the British Empire invaded this region including Batkhela. Malak Mir Azam Khan of Ibrahim Khel was leading the army of Batkhela. A new political agency for Dir, Swat and Chitral was established. The first officer to be placed in charge of the new Malakand Agency was Major Harold Arthur Deane(1854–1908). Later on 9 November 1901, Lieutenant Colonel Sir Harold Arthur Deane also became the first Chief Commissioner on the formation of the North-West Frontier Province (now Khyber Pakhtunkhwa).

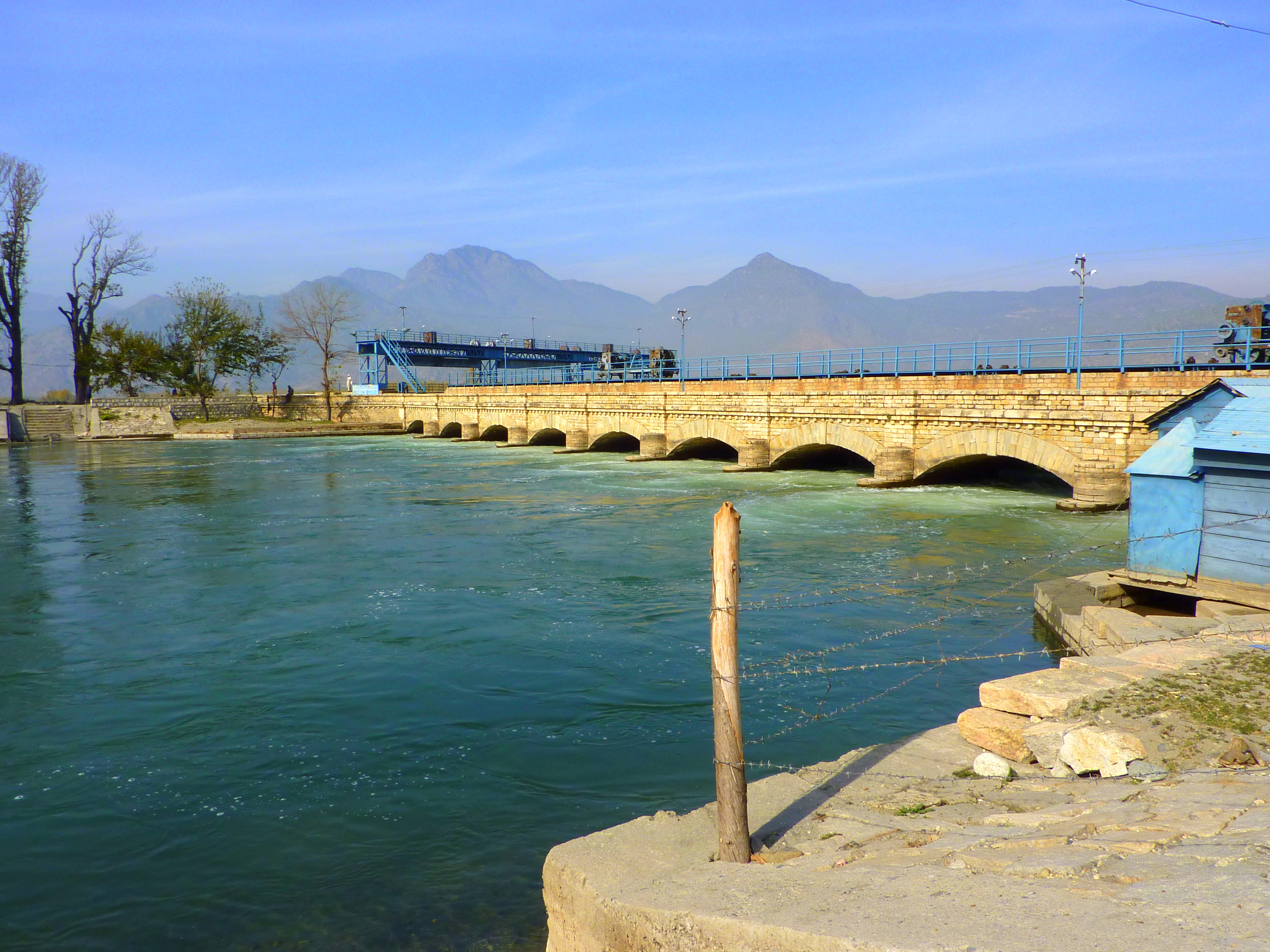
Amandara Head Works (Batkhela Water Canal Bridge)

That year when Batkhela was stormed by the 45th Sikhs after a fierce resistance, Lieut.-Colonel McRae was the very first British Army personnel to enter Batkhela. Before 1895, Batkhela was invaded by different outsiders including the Khan of Dir, Rahmatullah Khan, in 1869 and Wali-i-Dir Nawab Muhammad Umara Khan as well as the Swatis. On capturing Malakand Agency, the British Army decided to secure this area permanently from these outside aggressions. The British rulers declared this area as a 'Malakand Protected Area' (same as present). For that purpose, they prepared a police force called the Malakand Levies.

Between 1895 and 1912, the British made a huge impact on developmental works and infrastructure. They built roads from Batkhela to Chakdara, raised Chakdara and Malakand forts, set up Levies posts all over Malakand Agency, dug Upper Swat Canal and The Benton Tunnel (locally known as Tandail), constructed headwork's scheme at Batkhela, Churchill Paquet and Jabban Hydropower Station (Jabban Hydropower Plant). Beside those, the most important of all was the Amandara (region in Batkhela) Irrigation Scheme (bridges) which were designed and built by the British firm Ransomes & Rapier, Ltd. Makers of Ipswich in 1912. It is still irrigating a vast land of Sama Tehsil, Mardan and Swabi Districts and Chakdara area of the Lower Dir District.

The British ruled this area until the creation of Pakistan in 1947. All the matters of the tribal system were settled through the ‘Jirga System'. The Frontier Crimes Regulation (FCR) system or status was established in 1974 here. Furthermore, regular laws prevailing and the settle laws of district were also extended. Under the FCR, the Political Agent exercised his powers as a supreme authority while regular courts were established (Civil & Crime courts) after the year 1974.

== Governance ==
Police in district Malakand are known as Levies and their head or commandant is the Deputy Commissioner. The current Tehsil Nazim of Batkhela is Nasir Khan (Pakistan Tehreek-e-Insaf).

== Geography ==
Batkhela is a green city and Swat River is flowing in the middle of the city alongside N45. Batkhela is covered by tall hills from all sides and the most of famous peak of them is named 'Barcharai'.

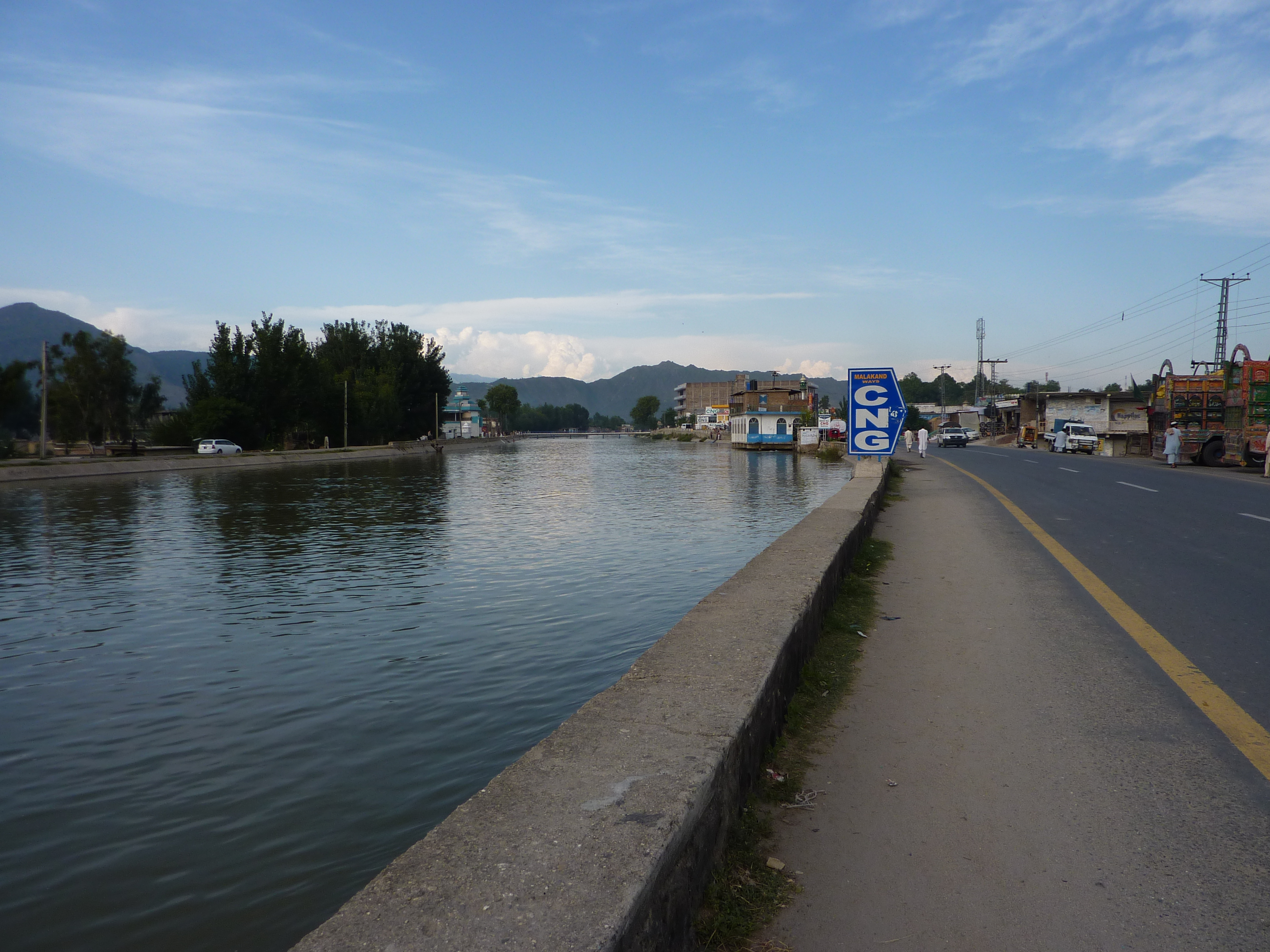
Batkhela water canal alongside the main G.T. road (N45)

== Division ==
Politically, Batkhela is divided into three union councils: upper, middle, and lower Batkhela.

== Demography ==
=== Population ===
According to the 6th Population & Housing Census 2017, the population of Batkhela was declared as 68,200. Data on religious beliefs across the town in the 2017 census shows that 100% of its population has declared themselves to be Muslim.

Historical population
| Year | Pop. | ±% p.a. |
|---|---|---|
| 1951 | ... | — |
| 1961 | ... | — |
| 1972 | 14,945 | — |
| 1981 | ... | — |
| 1998 | 43,179 | — |
| 2017 | 67,686 | +2.39% |
| 2023 | 73,525 | +1.39% |

The population of city in 1998 was 43,179 but according to the 2023 Census of Pakistan, the population has risen to 73,525.

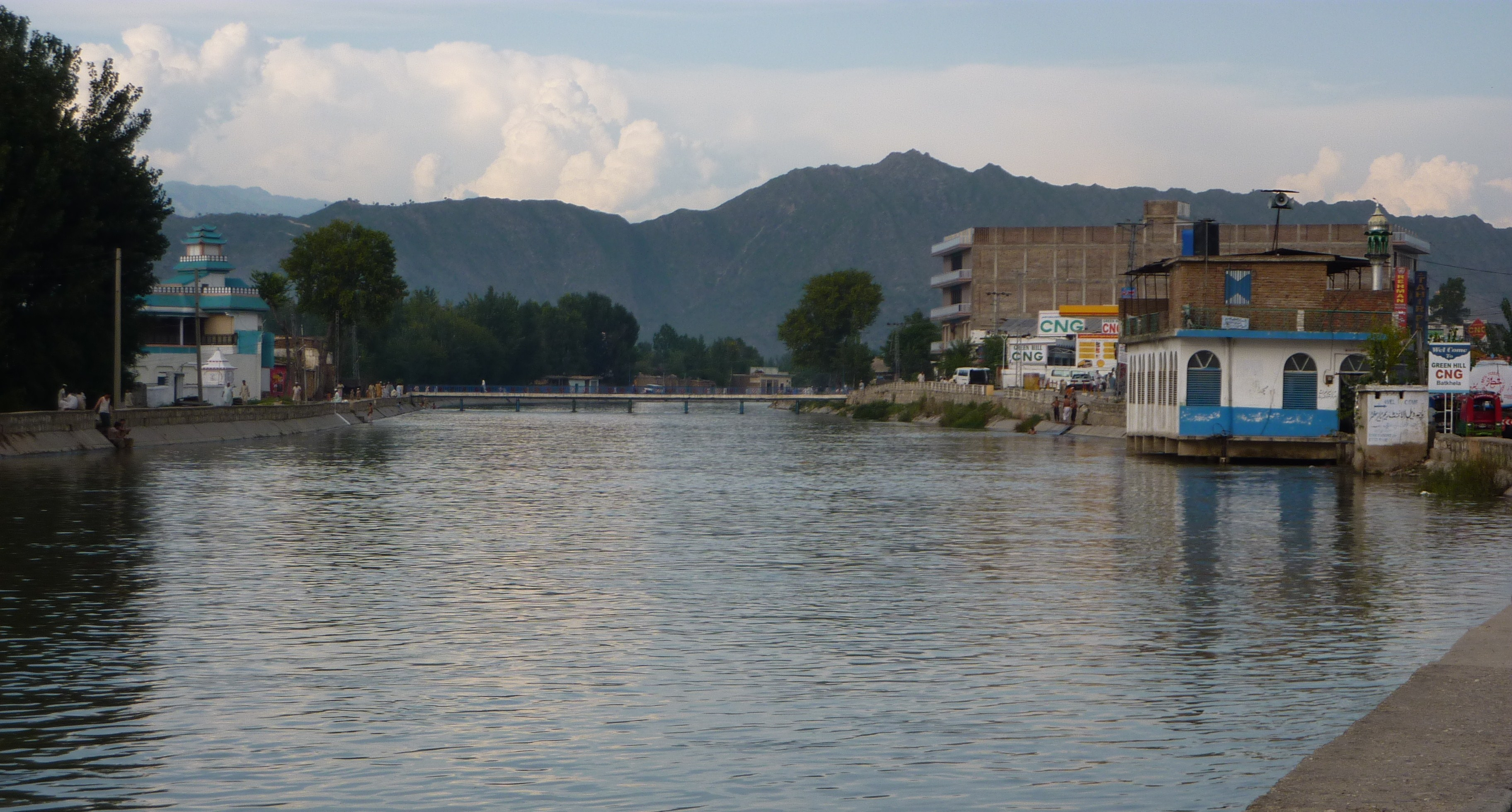
Batkhela Water Canal alongside N45

== People and culture ==
More than 95% of local residents are Pashtuns, who are the indigenous inhabitants of the region.

== Education ==
The first primary school was opened in Batkhela in 1915 and a high school was opened in Thana (part of Batkhela tehsil) in 1935 by British rulers. At present, there is one degree college for boys, one degree college for girls, two secondary schools for boys and one higher secondary school for girls that are functioning. In addition, there are several private schools and colleges functioning throughout this region. All schools and colleges are affiliated with the Board of Intermediate & Secondary Education (BISE) Malakand.

== Media ==
The District Press Club Malakand at Batkhela has been functional since 1988 in a rented building while reporters attached with the national, regional and local print and electronic media organizations have been performing their duties with devotion and sincerity. The former minister for information had approved funds for a well-equipped press club building at Batkhela during their term. The remaining funds were approved later on. The construction work on the building has been completed now. Soon, it will be inaugurated making the work of local journalists easier. The first-ever "monthly," the Hidayat Nama, was started by the late Muhammad Islam Ajmali who has been regarded as founder of journalism in the area. Later on, Mr. Amjad Ali Khan started his monthly Tasht from Batkhela that was closed after a few years. The Monthly 'Nazar' of Gohar Ali Gohar also closed after two years of circulation. Rab Nawaz Saghir started his 'Akas' that closed, too. Mr. Ihsan ur Rehman Sagar started a monthly Adrash which has been the first-ever declared newspaper from the area. It was made a weekly sometime later and then a daily newspaper, but was delisted by the KP Govt.
