= Dargai railway station =

Railway station in Pakistan

Dargai Railway Station درگئی ریلوے اسٹیشن

General information
- Location: Station Road; Dargai, Khyber Pakhtunkhwa 23060
- Coordinates: 34.5143°N 71.8946°E
- Owner: Pakistan Railways
- Line: Nowshera–Dargai Railway

Other information
- Status: Suspended

History
- Opened: 1886
- Closed: 2002

Services
Preceding station	Pakistan Railways	Following station
Skhakot towards Nowshera Junction	Nowshera–Dargai Railway	Terminus
Location
- Location within Khyber Pakhtunkhwa Location within Pakistan

Dargai Railway Station (Urdu: درگئی ریلوے اسٹیشن) is located in the town of Dargai in Malakand District, Khyber Pakhtunkhwa province, Pakistan. The station is the last station on Nowshera–Dargai Branch Line. The station was closed in 2002 by Pakistan Railways and Railway land was leased to avoid unauthorized occupation and encroachments. There is rare freight movement.

== See also ==
- List of railway stations in Pakistan
- Pakistan Railways
