= Nowshera Junction railway station =

Railway station in Pakistan

Nowshera Junction Station نوشہرہ جنکشن ریلوے اسٹیشن

General information
- Location: Station Road, Nowshera, Khyber Pakhtunkhwa 24100
- Coordinates: 34.0004°N 72.0053°E
- Owner: Ministry of Railways
- Lines: Karachi–Peshawar Railway Line; Nowshera–Dargai Railway; Peshawar Circular Railway

Other information
- Station code: NSR

History
- Opened: 1882

Services
Preceding station	Pakistan Railways	Following station
Hayat Sher Pao Shahid towards Kiamari	Karachi–Peshawar Line	Khushhal towards Peshawar Cantonment
Terminus	Nowshera–Dargai Railway	Risalpur Cantonment towards Dargai
Preceding station	Peshawar Circular Railway	Following station
Khushhal towards Peshawar Cantonment	(proposed)	Mardan Junction towards Charsadda
Location
- Location within Khyber Pakhtunkhwa Location within Pakistan

Nowshera Junction Railway Station (Urdu: نوشہرہ جنکشن ریلوے اسٹیشن, Pashto: د نوښار جنکشن اورګاډي سټيشن) is located in Nowshera city, in the eponymous district of Pakistan's Khyber Pakhtunkhwa province. The station is on the Karachi–Peshawar Railway Line as well as on the Nowshera–Dargai Railway line.

== See also ==
- List of railway stations in Pakistan
- Pakistan Railways
