= Swat Rani Zai Tehsil =

Swat Rani Zai Tehsil تحصیل سوات رانیزئی سوات رانيزي تحصیل
- Tehsil
- Country: Pakistan
- Province: Khyber Pakhtunkhwa
- District: Malakand
- Headquarters: Batkhela

Government
  - Chairman: Nasir Ali (PTI)

Population (2017)
  - Tehsil: 416,183
  - Urban: 68,200
  - Rural: 347,983
- Time zone: UTC+5 (PST)

Swat Rani Zai is a tehsil located in Malakand District, Khyber Pakhtunkhwa, Pakistan.

District Malakand has 3 tehsils i.e. Swat Rani Zai, Sam Rani Zai, and Thana Baizai. Each tehsil comprises certain numbers of Union councils. There are 28 union councils in district Malakand.

== See also ==
- Malakand District
