= Sam Rani Zai Tehsil =

Sam Rani Zai Tehsil تحصیل سام رانیزئی سام رانيزي تحصیل
- Tehsil
- Country: Pakistan
- Province: Khyber Pakhtunkhwa
- District: Malakand

Government
  - Chairman: Muhammad Islam (PTI)

Population (2017)
  - Total: 304,112
- Time zone: UTC+5 (PST)

Sam Rani Zai is a tehsil located in Malakand District, Khyber Pakhtunkhwa, Pakistan.

District Malakand has 3 tehsils i.e. Swat Rani Zai, Sam Rani Zai, and Thana Baizai Tehsil. Each Tehsil comprises certain numbers of Union councils. There are 28 union councils in district Malakand.

== See also ==
- Malakand District
