= Malakand District =

Malakand ضلع ملاکنڈ ملاکنډ ولسوالۍ
- District of Khyber Pakhtunkhwa
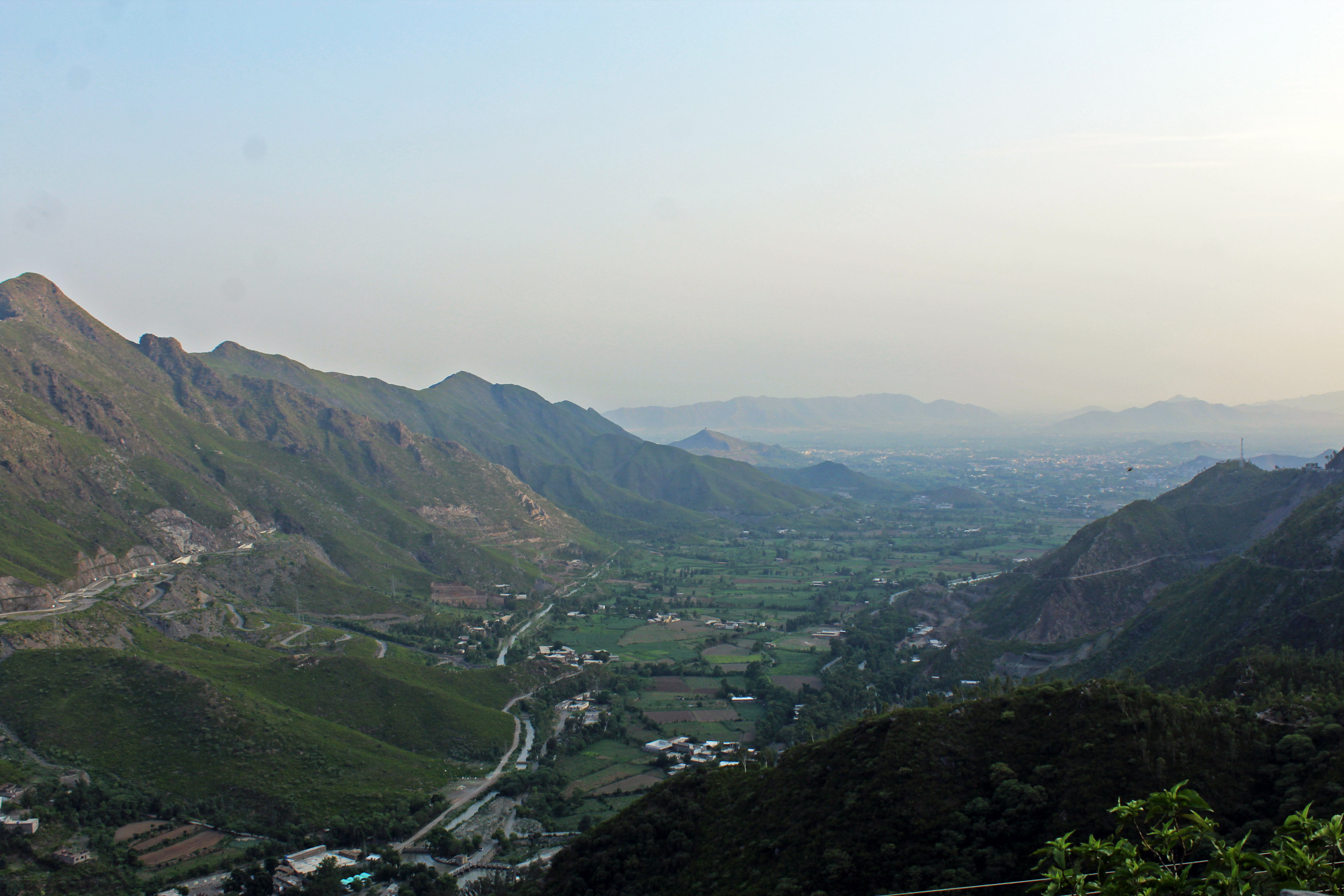
- Top: View from top of Malakand Pass; Bottom: River Swat near Jalawanan

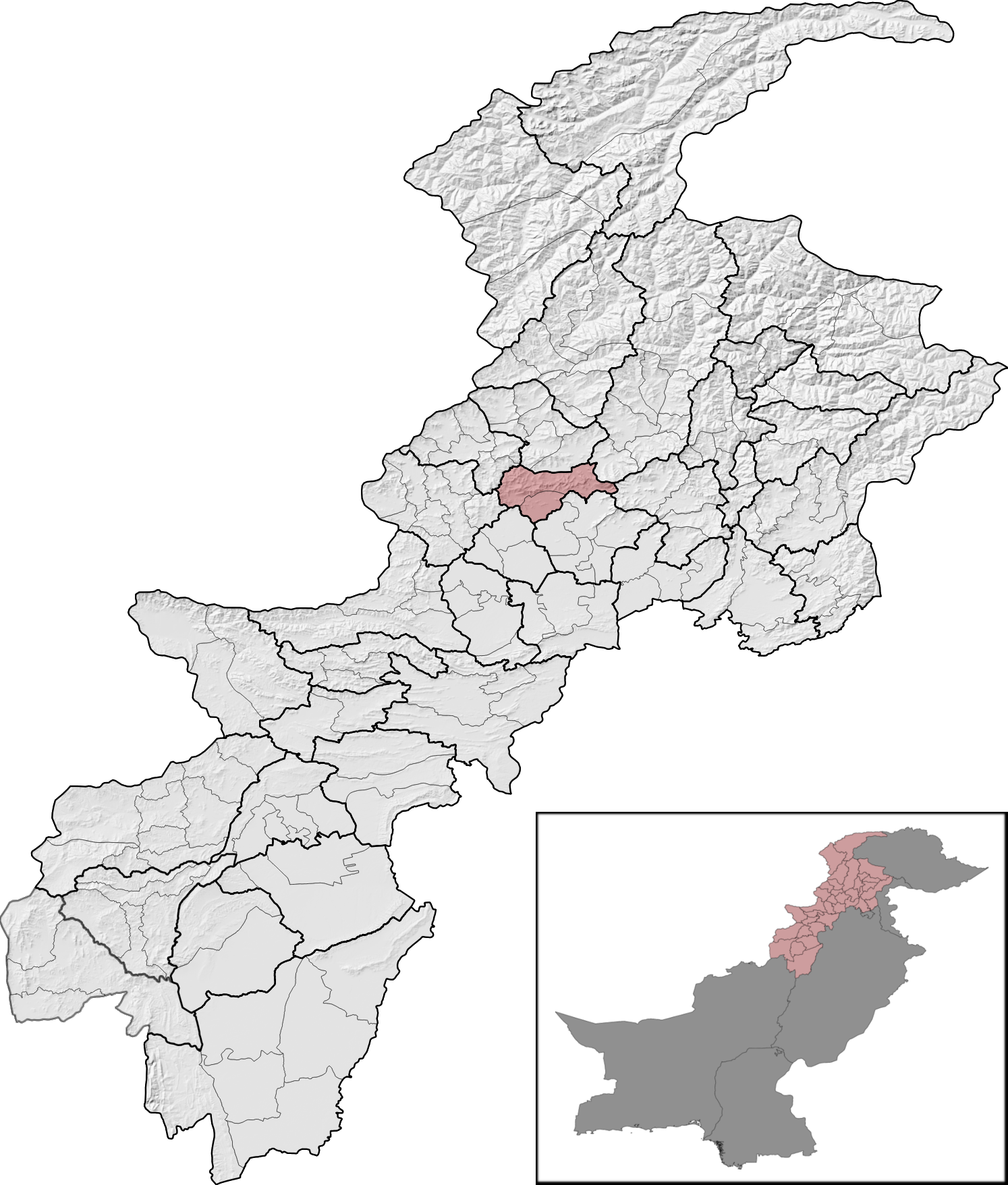
- Malakand District (red) in Khyber Pakhtunkhwa
- Country: Pakistan
- Province: Khyber Pakhtunkhwa
- Division: Malakand
- Headquarters: Batkhela

Government
  - Type: District Administration
  - Deputy Commissioner: Shahid Khan Mohmand
  - District Police Officer: N/A
  - District Health Officer: N/A

Area
  - Total: 952 km^{2} (368 sq mi)

Population (2023)
  - Total: 826,250
  - Density: 868/km^{2} (2,250/sq mi)
  - Urban: 73,590 (8.90%)
  - Rural: 753,260

Literacy
  - Literacy rate: Total: 61.66%; Male: 71.91%; Female: 51.05%
- Time zone: UTC+5 (PST)
- Number of Tehsils: 2
- Website: malakand.gov

Malakand District (Pashto: ملاکنډ ولسوالۍ, Urdu: ضلع ملاکنڈ) is a district of Malakand Division in the Khyber Pakhtunkhwa province of Pakistan. It was originally known as the Malakand Protected Area when it was set up by the British colonial administration a name it kept until 1969 when it was merged into Pakistan's Provincially Administered Tribal Areas and became a district, it achieved the status of district along with the princely states of Swat, Dir, & Chitral. As part of PATA it was known as the Malakand Agency, which a few months later (in 1970) was then made into Malakand Division.

Malakand is surrounded by mountains that were covered with the varieties of trees, though they have a barren appearance nowadays. It is bounded in the north by the Lower Dir District, in the east by the Swat District, in the west by Mohmand and Bajaur districts and in the southeast and southwest by the Mardan and Charsadda districts respectively. The area of Malakand protected area is 952 km^{2}.

== Geography ==
The soil of Malakand is loamy and moist, and is irrigated by the Swat River which flows down from Swat, passing through Swat Ranizai and joins the river Kabul near Charsadda. The average rainfall is not enough, therefore the soil requires artificial irrigation.

There are rare scenic places and tourist resorts in Malakand like Jabban and Malakand hydro-electric project. Water passes through a 4.8-kilometre-long tunnel, and has a natural fall of 106 metres. The main income-generating source in Malakand is the two power houses at Dargai and Malakand Khas. There are about 11 other suitable sites for construction of Small Hydel Power projects that needed investors' attention. Malakand's mountains are rich with mineral resources. Deposits of Chromite Iron, China Clay and Fuller's Earth have been found in Malakand.

== History ==
Historic ruins, found in different places in the district, indicate that this area was part of the Gandhara civilization and Buddhist peoples have also lived here.

In the 12th century, Muhammad Ghori invaded the area and Islam began to spread there. About 400 years ago, successive Mughal rulers attempted in vain to capture this area. After the fall of the Mughals, Sikh rulers tried to conquer this area but were repulsed. The British had always looked at this area with covetous eyes but dared no venture to flirt with it openly.

In 1882, The British approached to the elders of the Malakand District (then known as Malakand Agency) with the request to allow the passage of post to Chitral, which was then in the administrative sphere of Gilgit. In 1885, the Chitral Expedition necessitated the British intervention in this area. British officer and troops had been besieged in Chitral by Chitralis. To reinforce their forces there, they needed a route to Chitral as the Gilgit-Chitral road, the only route at that time, was covered with snow and they had no option left except to pass through Malakand Agency. The British therefore laid siege of the Malakand Pass. The British artillery particularly proving more than a match for the old and rusty guns and swords of the natives. To fortify their position and ensure the safety of the strategically Important Chitral road, they constructed two forts at Malakand and Chakdara, and many pickets in the surrounding hills. One of them, Churchill's Picket, was named after Lt. Churchill who later on became the Prime Minister of Britain. Since then the British intervened in the politics of the area. A political agent was stationed at Malakand to mediate between the British and the people of the area.

== Demographics ==
=== Population ===
Historical population
Year	Pop.	±% p.a.
1951	89,699	—
1961	133,627	+4.07%
1972	185,872	+3.05%
1981	257,797	+3.70%
1998	452,291	+3.36%
2017	717,806	+2.46%
2023	826,250	+2.37%

As of the 2023 census, Malakand district has 113,118 households and a population of 826,250. The district has a sex ratio of 104.80 males to 100 females and a literacy rate of 61.66%: 71.91% for males and 51.05% for females. 244,624 (29.64% of the surveyed population) are under 10 years of age. 73,525 (8.90%) live in urban areas.

=== Ethnic groups ===
Major ethnic groups in malakand are:

- Gujjar
- Pashtun tribes (Utmankhel, Yusufzai, Ranizai)
- Syyid

In Malakand district Gujjars are the oldest Inhabitants of the area before the arrival of other tribes.

=== Language ===
Languages of Nowshera district (2023)
1. Pashto (98.3%)
2. Others (mainly Gujari, Kohistani) (1.39%)

Pashto was the predominant language, spoken by 98.31% of the population. 1.39% (mainly Gujari) of the population spoke languages classified as 'Others' on the census. Other minority spoken languages are Gujari and Kohistani. As per 2023 estimates by Tablue Public in Malakand District Gujari along with Kohistani is spoken by 1.09% of the population.

=== Religion ===
According to 2023 Pakistani census, 99% were Muslims and 2,321 (0.28%) people in the district were from religious minorities, mainly Christians.

== Administration ==
=== Subdivisions ===
Tehsil	Name (Urdu) (Pashto)	Area (km²)	Pop. (2023)	Density (ppl/km²) (2023)	Literacy rate (2023)	Union Councils
Sam Ranizai Tehsil	(Urdu: تحصیل سام رانیزئی)(Pashto: سام رانيزي تحصیل)	280	353,291	1,261.75	59.13%	
Swat Ranizai Tehsil	(Urdu: تحصیل سوات رانیزئی)(Pashto: سوات رانيزي تحصیل)	672	472,959	703.81	63.57%	
Thana Baizai Tehsil	(Urdu: تحصیل تھانہ بائزئی)(Pashto: تانی بايزي تحصیل)	...	...	...	...	
Utman Khel Tehsil		...	...	...	31.50%	

=== National assembly ===
This district is represented by one elected MNA (Member of National Assembly) in Pakistan National Assembly. Its constituency is NA-35.

Election	Member	Party
2002	Maulana Muhammad Inayat-ur-Rehman	MMA
2004	Syed Bakhtiar Maani	MMA
2008	Lal Muhammad Khan	PPPP
2013	Junaid Akbar	PTI
2018	Junaid Akbar	PTI

=== Provincial Assembly ===
Member of Provincial Assembly	Party Affiliation	Constituency	Year
Shakeel Ahmed	Pakistan Tehreek-e-Insaf	PK-18 Malakand Protected Area-I	2018
Pir Musawir Khan	Pakistan Tehreek-e-Insaf	PK-19 Malakand Protected Area-II	2018

The district of Malakand is divided into two Tehsils:

1. Swat Ranizai (Batkhela):

Batkhela is the main tehsil and capital of Malakand District. During the era of Ashoka and Kanishka Batkhela was ruled by a leader named Butt hence the city has been given the name Batkhela. According to the 1998 census, the population of Batkhela is 38,222, and it is estimated to be 39,703 according to the World Gazetteer. This valley is covered by tall hills from all sides and there are many fast-flowing rivers in the area. One water canal that pours into a small dam in Jaban area is the main source of electricity production.

Batkhela main bazaar is more than 3 kilometers long; there are no intersections (junctions) so no traffic lights. Therefore, it is the longest bazaar that has no traffic lights or junctions (intersections) on it.

2. Sama Ranizai (Dargai):

Dargai is one of the tehsils of Malakand District. Dargai is located on main N-45 highway from Nowshera to Pulchokai N-95 Swat, Dir(L), Dir(U) and Chitral. Most of the Conquerors, Traders tourists going to these areas had to take Dargai, Batkhela route so business flourished in Dargai and Batkhela. Due to recent law and order situation tourists going to Swat have considerably decreased affecting people's business here. Dargai is known for its Timber Market and Batkhela for its wholesale Market.

Dargai and Batkhela are known for their battles during British rule. The British commenced their campaign against Malakand in 1853 and spread its sphere of influence to the whole Malakand since then.

There are rare scenic places and tourist resorts in Dargai like Jabban and Malakand hydro-electric project. Water passes through a 4.8-kilometre-long tunnel, and has a natural fall of 106 metres. There are two power houses at Dargai and Malakand Khas. A third power plant of 81MW has recently been constructed in Dargai on Wartair side. Dargai is also home to Punjab Regminent Centre located Near Dargai Railway Station.

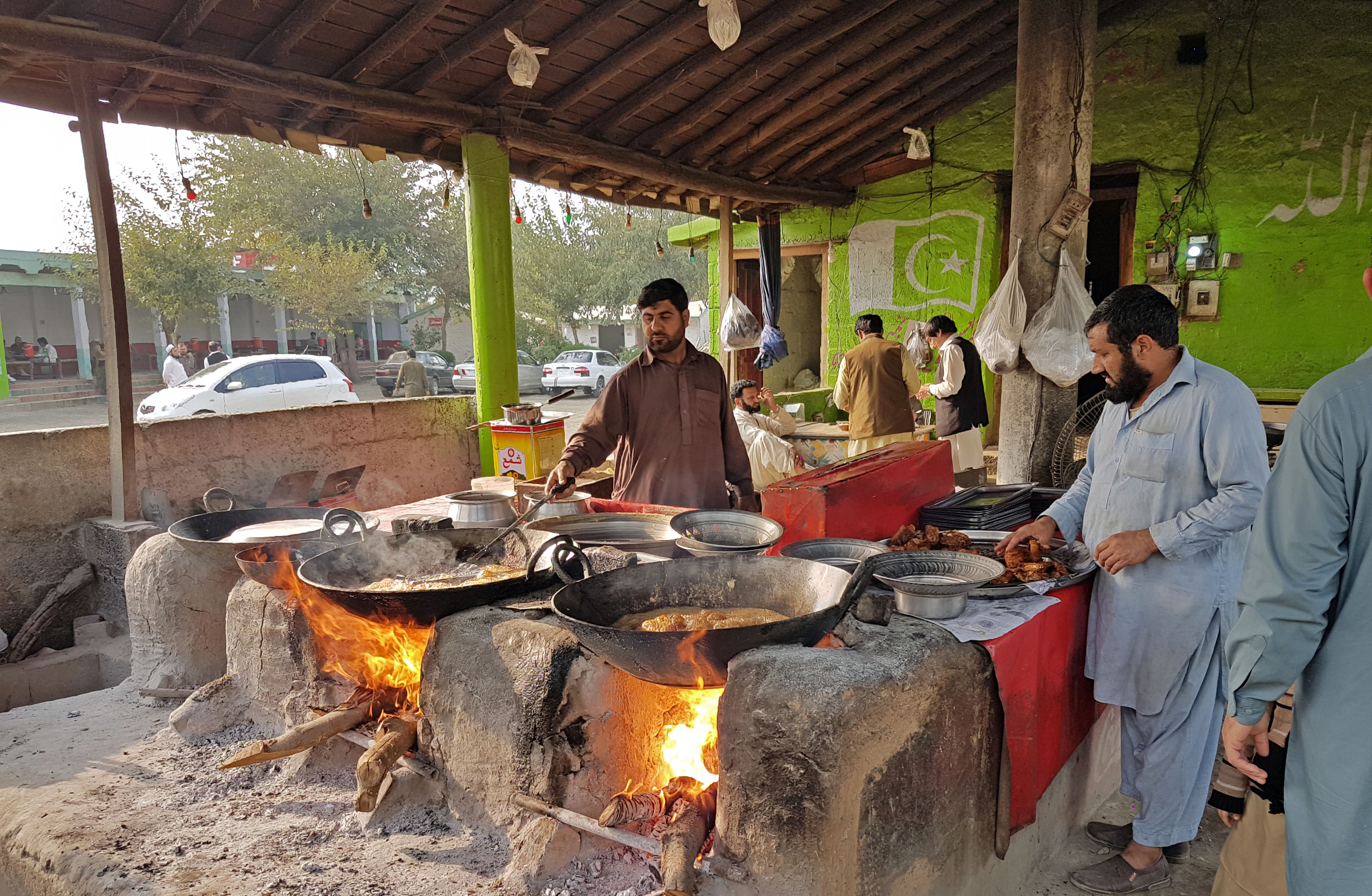
Fish Vendor, Malakand District.
